= Order of precedence in Ontario =

Relative preeminence of officials for ceremonial purposes

The Ontario order of precedence is a nominal and symbolic hierarchy used for ceremonial occasions of a provincial nature within the province of Ontario. It has no legal standing but is used to dictate ceremonial protocol.

== Ontario order of precedence ==
This is a list of the order of precedence in Ontario as of January 14, 2023.

1. The King in Right of Ontario (His Majesty Charles III)
2. Lieutenant Governor of Ontario (The Hon. Edith Dumont OOnt)
3. Premier of Ontario (The Hon. Doug Ford MPP)
4. Chief Justice of Ontario (The Hon. Michael Tulloch)
5. Former Lieutenant Governors of Ontario, in order of their departure from office:
  5. The Hon. Hal Jackman OC OOnt CD (1991–1997)
  6. The Hon. Elizabeth Dowdeswell OC OOnt (2014–2023)
8. Former Premiers of Ontario, in order of their first assumption of office:
  8. The Hon. David Peterson PC OOnt KC (1985–1990)
  9. The Hon. Bob Rae PC CC OOnt KC (1990–1995)
  10. The Hon. Mike Harris OOnt (1995–2002)
  11. The Hon. Ernie Eves OOnt KC (2002–2003)
  12. The Hon. Dalton McGuinty OOnt (2003–2013)
  13. The Hon. Kathleen Wynne (2013–2018)
14. Speaker of the Legislative Assembly of Ontario (The Hon. Donna Skelly MPP)
15. Heads of accredited diplomatic missions in Ottawa, in order of the date they presented their diplomatic credentials to the Governor General of Canada:
  15. (Honduras) Sofia Lastenia Cerrato Rodriguez (September 2010)
  16. (Chad) Mahamat Ali Adoum (June 2014)
  17. (Brunei) Pg Kamal Bashah Pg Ahmad (October 2014)
  18. (Andorra) Elisenda Vives Balmana (April 2016)
  19. (Albania) Ermal Muca (June 2016)
  20. (Uruguay) Martin Alejandro Vidal Delgado (September 2016)
  21. (Yemen) Jamal Abdullah Yahya Al-Sallal (November 2016)
  22. (Djibouti) Mohamed Siad Douale (March 2017)
  23. (Germany) Sabine Anne Sparwasser (August 2017)
  24. (Uganda) Joy Ruth Acheng (September 2017)
  25. (Nigeria) Adeyinka Olatokunbo Asekun (October 2017)
  26. (Tunisia) Mohamed Imed Torjemane (October 2017)
  27. (Zambia) Felix Mfula (October 2017)
  28. (Nicaragua) Maurizio Carlo Gelli (November 2017)
  29. (United Arab Emirates) Fahad Saeed M. A. Alraqbani (January 2018)
  30. (Lebanon) Fadi Ziadeh (January 2018)
  31. (Saint Kitts and Nevis) Vaughna Sherry Tross (February 2018)
  32. (Senegal) Viviane Laure Elisabeth Bampassy (March 2018)
  33. (Morocco) Souriya Otmani (June 2018)
  34. (Kazakhstan) Akylbek Kamaldinov (June 2018)
  35. (Cyprus) Vasilios Philippou (June 2018)
  36. (Peru) Roberto Rafael Max Rodriguez Arnillas (June 2018)
  37. (Bulgaria) Svetlana Sashova Stoycheva-Etropolski (June 2018)
  38. (Estonia) Toomas Lukk (September 2018)
  39. (Slovakia) Vit Koziak (September 2018)
  40. (Mongolia) Ariunbold Yadmaa (November 2018)
  41. (Egypt) Ahmed Mahmoud A. Abu Zeid (November 2018)
  42. (Turkey) Kerim Uras (December 2018)
  43. (Switzerland) Salome Meyer (February 2019)
  44. (Sweden) Urban Christian Ahlin (February 2019)
  45. (Mexico) Juan Jose Ignacio Gomez Camacho (May 2019)
  46. (Nepal) Bhrigu Dhungana (May 2019)
  47. (Armenia) Anahit Harutyunyan (July 2019)
  48. (Finland) Roy Kennet Eriksson (July 2019)
  49. (Iraq) Wadee Batti Hanna Albatti (July 2019)
  50. (Tanzania) Mpoki Mwasumbi Ulisubisya (September 2019)
  51. (Czech Republic) Borek Lizec (September 2019)
  52. (Bosnia and Herzegovina) Marko Milisav (September 2019)
  53. (Costa Rica) Mauricio Ortiz Ortiz (September 2019)
  54. (Denmark) Hanne Fugl Eskjaer (September 2019)
  55. (China) Peiwu Cong (November 2019)
  56. (Afghanistan) M. Hassan Soroosh (November 2019)
  57. (Jordan) Majed Alqatarneh (November 2019)
  58. (Rwanda) Prosper Higiro (November 2019)
  59. (Kuwait) Reem M Kh Z Alkhaled (November 2019)
  60. (Venezuela) Orlando José Viera Blanco (November 2019)
  61. (Zimbabwe) Ruth Masodzi Chikwira (December 2019)
  62. (Croatia) Vice Skracic (December 2019)
  63. (Panama) Romy Vasquez Morales (December 2019)
  64. (Lithuania) Darius Skusevicius (December 2019)
  65. (New Zealand) Martin Wilfred Harvey (January 2020)
  66. (Kosovo) Adriatik Kryeziu (March 2020)
  67. (Brazil) Pedro Henrique Lopes Borio (March 2020)
  68. (Mali) Fatima Meite (March 2020)
  69. (India) Ajay Bisaria (March 2020)
  70. (Vietnam) Cao Phong Pham (July 2020)
  71. (South Korea) Keung Ryong Chang (July 2020)
  72. (Jamaica) Sharon Joyce Miller (August 2020)
  73. (Thailand) Kallayana Vipattipumiprates (October 2020)
  74. (Netherlands) Goverdina Christina Coppoolse (October 2020)
  75. (Hungary) Maria Eva Vass-Salazar (October 2020)
  76. (Norway) Jon Elvedal Fredriksen (October 2020)
  77. (Republic of Ireland) Eamonn Mckee (October 2020)
  78. (Serbia) Dejan Ralevic (November 2020)
  79. (Haiti) Wien-Weibert Arthus (November 2020)
  80. (Somalia) Hassan Dahir Dimbil (November 2020)
  81. (Philippines) Rodolfo Robles (November 2020)
  82. (Greece) Konstantina Athanassiadou (November 2020)
  83. (El Salvador) Ricardo Alfonso Cisneros Rodriguez (November 2020)
  84. (European Union) Melita Gabric (February 2021)
  85. (Romania) Bogdan Manoiu (March 2021)
  86. (Bangladesh) Dr Khalilur Rahman (March 2021)
  87. (Guatemala) Guisela Atalida Godinez Sazo (March 2021)
  88. (Dominican Republic) Michelle Cohen De Friedlander (March 2021)
  89. (Moldova) Emil Druc (March 2021)
  90. (Austria) Sylvia Meier-Kajbic (March 2021)
  91. (Trinidad and Tobago) Dennis Daniel Moses (March 2021)
  92. (Colombia) Jorge Alberto Julian Londono De La Cuesta (March 2021)
  93. (Argentina) Maria Josefina Martinez Gramuglia (March 2021)
  94. (Chile) Raul Eduardo Fernandez Daza (March 2021)
  95. (United Kingdom) Susannah Clare Goshko (August 2021)
  96. (Russia) Oleg Stepanov (September 2021)
  97. (Ivory Coast) Bafetigue Ouattara (September 2021)
  98. (Italy) Andrea Ferrari (September 2021)
  99. (Iceland) Hlynur Gudjonsson (September 2021)
  100. (Kenya) Immaculate Nduku Musili Wambua (November 2021)
  101. (Belgium) Patrick Guido M. Van Gheel (November 2021)
  102. (Lesotho) Molise Paul Tseole (November 2021)
  103. (Malaysia) Anizan Binti Adnin (December 2021)
  104. (Holy See) Ivan Jurkovic (December 2021)
  105. (Slovenia) Andrej Gregor Rode (December 2021)
  106. (Ghana) Anselm Ransford Adzete Sowah (December 2021)
  107. (Sri Lanka) Harsha Kumara Navaratne Weraduwa (December 2021)
  108. (Spain) Alfredo Martinez Serrano (December 2021)
  109. (Israel) Ronen Pinchas Hoffman (December 2021)
  110. (United States) David Louis Cohen (December 2021)
  111. (Australia) Scott Michael Ryan (December 2021)
  112. (Qatar) Khalid Rashid S. H. Al-Mansouri (March 2022)
  113. (Barbados) Gline Arley Clarke (April 2022)
  114. (Algeria) Noureddine Bardad Daidj (April 2022)
  115. (Indonesia) Daniel Tumpal Sumurung Simanjuntak (April 2022)
  116. (South Africa) Rieaz Shaik (April 2022)
  117. (Latvia) Kaspars Ozolins (April 2022)
118. Members of the Executive Council of Ontario, in accordance with the precedence document issued by the Cabinet Office:
  118. The Hon. Raymond Cho MPP, Minister for Seniors and Accessibility
  119. The Hon. Vic Fedeli MPP, Chair of Cabinet
  120. The Hon. Caroline Mulroney KC MPP, Minister of Francophone Affairs
  121. The Hon. Doug Downey KC MPP, Attorney General
  122. The Hon. Stephen Lecce MPP, Minister of Energy and Mines
  123. The Hon. Michael Tibollo MPP, Associate Minister of Mental Health and Addictions
  124. The Hon. Peter Bethlenfalvy MPP, Minister of Finance
  125. The Hon. Stan Cho MPP, Minister of Tourism, Culture and Gaming
  126. The Hon. Jill Dunlop MPP, Minister of Emergency Preparedness and Response
  127. The Hon. David Piccini MPP, Minister of Labour, Immigration, Training and Skills Development
  128. The Hon. Greg Rickford MPP, Minister of Indigenous Affairs and First Nations Economic Reconciliation
  129. The Hon. Prabmeet Sarkaria MPP, Minister of Transportation
  130. The Hon. Kinga Surma MPP, Minister of Infrastructure
  131. The Hon. Lisa Thompson MPP, Minister of Rural Affairs
  132. The Hon. Sylvia Jones MPP, Deputy Premier and Minister of Health
  133. The Hon. Michael Kerzner MPP, Solicitor General
  134. The Hon. Neil Lumsden MPP, Minister of Sport
  135. The Hon. Michael Parsa MPP, Minister of Children, Community and Social Services
  136. The Hon. George Pirie MPP, Minister of Northern Economic Development and Growth
  137. The Hon. Graydon Smith MPP, Associate Minister of Municipal Affairs and Housing
  138. The Hon. Charmaine Williams MPP, Associate Minister of Women's Social and Economic Opportunity
147. Leader of His Majesty's Loyal Opposition (Marit Stiles MPP)
148. Members of the King's Privy Council for Canada residing in Ontario:
  1. Members of the Cabinet of Canada, in order of their appointment:
    148. The Rt. Hon. Mark Carney PC OC MP, Prime Minister of Canada
    149. The Hon. Anita Anand PC MP, Minister of Foreign Affairs
    150. The Hon. Patty Hajdu PC MP, Minister of Jobs and Families
    151. The Hon. Chrystia Freeland PC MP, Minister of Transportation and Internal Trade
    152. The Hon. Gary Anandasangaree PC MP, Minister of Public Safety
    153. The Hon. Rechie Valdez PC MP, Minister of Women and Gender Equality
    154. The Hon. David McGuinty PC MP, Minister of National Defence
    155. The Hon. Shafqat Ali PC MP, President of the Treasury Board
    156. The Hon. Julie Dabrusin PC MP, Minister of Environment and Climate Change
    157. The Hon. Tim Hodgson PC MP, Minister of Energy and Natural Resources
    158. The Hon. Maninder Sidhu PC MP, Minister of International Trade
    159. The Hon. Evan Solomon PC MP, Minister of Artificial Intelligence and Digital Innovation
  2. Other members of the Privy Council, in order of their appointment:
    164. The Hon. Jean-Jacques Blais PC (1976)
    165. The Hon. Tony Abbot PC (1976)
    166. The Hon. David MacDonald PC (1979)
    167. The Hon. David Crombie PC OC (1979)
    168. The Hon. Perrin Beatty PC (1979)
    169. The Hon. James Fleming PC (1980)
    170. The Hon. Ed Lumley PC (1980)
    171. The Hon. Paul Cosgrove PC (1980)
    172. The Hon. Judy Erola PC (1980)
    173. The Hon. David Collenette PC (1983)
    174. The Hon. Roy MacLaren PC (1983)
    175. The Hon. Otto Jelinek PC (1984)
    176. The Hon. Rob Nicholson PC KC (1993)
    177. The Hon. Carolyn Bennett PC (2003)
    178. The Hon. Bev Oda PC (2006)
    179. The Hon. Marjory LeBreton PC (2006)
    180. The Hon. Diane Finley PC (2006)
    181. The Hon. Michael Chong PC MP (2006)
    182. The Hon. Gordon O'Connor PC OMM CD (2006)
    183. The Hon. John Baird PC (2006)
    184. The Hon. Tony Clement PC (2006)
    185. The Hon. Peter Van Loan PC (2006)
    186. The Hon. Gary Goodyear PC (2008)
    187. The Hon. Lisa Raitt PC (2008)
    188. The Hon. Julian Fantino PC COM OOnt (2011)
    189. The Hon. Bal Gosal PC (2011)
    190. The Hon. Joe Oliver PC (2011)
    191. The Hon. Peter Kent PC (2011)
    192. The Hon. Kellie Leitch PC OOnt FRCS (2013)
    193. The Hon. Pierre Poilievre PC (2013)
    194. The Hon. Ed Holder PC (2014)
    195. The Hon. Erin O'Toole PC CD (2015)
    196. The Hon. Jane Philpott PC (2015)
    197. The Hon. Karina Gould PC (2015)
    198. The Hon. Mark Holland PC (2015)
    199. The Hon. Kamal Khera PC MP, Minister of Seniors (2021)
    200. The Hon. Bill Blair PC COM MP (2017)
    201. The Hon. Ahmed Hussen PC MP (2017)
    202. The Hon. Filomena Tassi PC (2017)
    203. The Hon. Marco Mendicino PC (2017)
    204. The Hon. Mary Ng PC (2018)
    205. The Hon. Mona Fortier PC MP (2019)
    206. The Hon. Omar Alghabra PC (2021)
    207. The Hon. Marci Ien PC (2021)
    208. The Hon. Helena Jaczek PC MP (2021)
197. Chief Justice of the Ontario Superior Court of Justice (The Hon. Geoffrey B. Morawetz)
198. Associate Chief Justice of Ontario (The Hon. J. Michal Fairburn)
199. Associate Chief Justice of the Ontario Superior Court of Justice (The Hon. Faye McWatt)
200. Judges of the Court of Appeal for Ontario, in order of date of appointment
201. Judges of the Ontario Superior Court of Justice, in order of date of appointment
202. Members of the Legislative Assembly of Ontario, in order of the date of their first election to the Legislature
  1. Members of the Senate who represent Ontario, in order by their date of appointment
  2. Members of the House of Commons who represent Ontario constituencies, in order by their date of election
203. Heads of religious denominations
204. Heads of Consular Post with jurisdiction in the Province of Ontario with precedence governed by date of exequatur
205. Judges of the Ontario Court of Justice
  1. Chair of the host Regional Municipality (where applicable)
  2. host Mayor
  1. Other Chairs of Regional Municipalities (where applicable)
  2. Other Mayors, in order by their date of appointment or election to office
  3. Aboriginal leaders: Chiefs of the Treaty First Nations in Ontario
  1. Deputy Ministers, with precedence governed by date of appointment
  2. Other Ontario Public Service Officials with the rank and status of Deputy Ministers, with precedence governed by date of appointment
