= List of diplomatic missions in Ottawa =

This is a list of the 131 resident embassies/high commissions in Ottawa. For other diplomatic missions in Canada, see List of diplomatic missions in Canada.

== Embassies/High Commissions ==
Country	Address	Area	Image	Website
(Islamic Republic of Afghanistan) Afghanistan	240 Argyle Avenue	Centretown		
Albania	130 Albert Street, Suite 302	Centretown		
Algeria	500 Wilbrod Street	Sandy Hill		
Argentina	81 Metcalfe Street, Suite 700	Downtown		
Armenia	7 Delaware Avenue	Centretown		
Australia	50 O'Connor Street, Suite 1301	Downtown		
Austria	445 Wilbrod Street	Sandy Hill		
Azerbaijan	275 Slater Street, Suite 1203	Downtown		
(The Bahamas) Bahamas	99 Bank Street, Suite 415	Downtown		
Bangladesh	350 Sparks Street, Suite 1100	Downtown		
Barbados	55 Metcalfe Street, Suite 470	Downtown		
Belgium	360 Albert Street, Suite 820	Downtown		
Bolivia	130 Albert Street, Suite 416	Downtown		
Bosnia and Herzegovina	17 Blackburn Avenue	Sandy Hill		
Brazil	450 Wilbrod Street	Sandy Hill		
Brunei	395 Laurier Avenue East	Sandy Hill		
Bulgaria	325 Stewart Street	Sandy Hill		
Burkina Faso	48 Range Road	Sandy Hill		
Burundi	81 Metcalfe Street, Suite 500	Downtown		
Cameroon	170 Clemow Avenue	The Glebe		
Chad	350 Sparks Street, Suite 802	Downtown		
Chile	50 O'Connor Street, Suite 1413	Downtown		
China	515 Saint Patrick Street	Lower Town		
Colombia	360 Albert Street, Suite 1002	Downtown		
(Democratic Republic of the Congo) DR Congo	18 Range Road	Sandy Hill		
(Republic of the Congo) Republic of Congo	322 Waverley Street	Centretown		
Costa Rica	275 Slater Street, Floor 10, Suite 1002	Downtown		
Croatia	229 Chapel Street	Sandy Hill		
Cuba	388 Main Street	Old Ottawa South		
Cyprus	150 Metcalfe Street, Suite 1002	Downtown		
Czech Republic	251 Cooper Street	Centretown		
Denmark	47 Clarence Street, Suite 450	Byward Market		
Dominican Republic	130 Albert Street, Suite 1605	Downtown		
Ecuador	99 Bank Street, Suite 230	Downtown		
Egypt	454 Laurier Avenue East	Sandy Hill		
El Salvador	209 Kent Street	Centretown		
Estonia	168 Daly Avenue	Lower Town		
Ethiopia	350 Sparks Street, Unit 908	Downtown		
Finland	55 Metcalfe Street, Suite 850	Downtown		
France	42 Sussex Drive	New Edinburgh		
Gabon	2283 St. Laurent Boulevard, Suite 103	Ottawa		
(Georgia (country)) Georgia	340 Albert Street, Suite 940	Downtown		
Germany	1 Waverley Street	Centretown		
Ghana	1 Clemow Avenue	The Glebe		
Greece	80 MacLaren Street	Centretown		
Guatemala	130 Albert Street, Suite 1010	Downtown		
Guinea	483 Wilbrod Street	Sandy Hill		
Guyana	123 Slater Street	Downtown		
Haiti	85 Albert Street, Suite 1110	Downtown		
Holy See	724 Manor Avenue	Rockcliffe Park		
Honduras	130 Albert Street, Suite 504	Downtown		
Hungary	299 Waverley Street	Centretown		
Iceland	360 Albert Street, Suite 710	Downtown		
India	10 Springfield Road	New Edinburgh		
Indonesia	55 Parkdale Avenue	Mechanicsville		
Iraq	189 Laurier Avenue East	Sandy Hill		
(Republic of Ireland) Ireland	150 Metcalfe Street, Suite 1700	Downtown		
Israel	50 O'Connor Street, Suite 1005	Downtown		
Italy	275 Slater Street, 21st floor	Downtown		
Ivory Coast	9 Marlborough Avenue	Sandy Hill		
Jamaica	350 Sparks Street, Suite 910	Downtown		
Japan	255 Sussex Drive	Lower Town		
Jordan	100 Bronson Avenue, Suite 701	Downtown		
Kazakhstan	150 Metcalfe Street, Suite 701	Downtown		
Kenya	415 Laurier Avenue East	Sandy Hill		
Kosovo	470 Somerset Street West	Centretown		
Kuwait	333 Sussex Drive	Byward Market		
Latvia	350 Sparks Street, Suite 1200	Downtown		
Lebanon	640 Lyon Street South	The Glebe		
Lesotho	130 Albert Street, Suite 1820	Downtown		
Libya	170 Laurier Avenue West, Suite 710	Downtown		
Lithuania	150 Metcalfe Street, Suite 1600	Downtown		
Luxembourg	222 Queen Street, Suite 1014	Downtown		
Madagascar	3 Raymond Street	Centretown West		
Malaysia	60 Boteler Street	Lower Town		
Mali	50 Goulburn Avenue	Sandy Hill		
Malta	275 Slater Street	Downtown		
Mauritania	81 Metcalfe Street, 12th Floor	Downtown		
Mexico	45 O'Connor Street, Suite 1000	Downtown		
Moldova	275 Slater Street, Suite 801	Downtown		
Mongolia	130 Albert Street, Suite 1620	Downtown		
Morocco	1730 St Laurent Blvd, #800	Industrial Park		
Myanmar	336 Island Park Drive	Hampton Park		
Nepal	408 Queen Street	Downtown		
Netherlands	350 Albert Street, Suite 2020	Downtown		
New Zealand	150 Elgin Street, Suite 1401	Downtown		
Nigeria	295 Metcalfe Street	Centretown		
North Macedonia	130 Albert Street, Suite 1006	Downtown		
Norway	150 Metcalfe Street, Suite 1300	Downtown		
Pakistan	10 Range Road	Sandy Hill		
Panama	130 Albert Street, Suite 803	Downtown		
Peru	130 Albert Street, Suite 1901	Downtown		
Philippines	30 Murray Street	Byward Market		
Poland	443 Daly Avenue	Sandy Hill		
Portugal	645 Island Park Drive	Wellington West/Island Park		
Qatar	150 Metcalfe Street, 8th floor	Downtown		
Romania	655 Rideau Street	Lower Town		
Russia	285 Charlotte Street	Sandy Hill		
Rwanda	294 Albert Street, Suite 404	Downtown		
Saint Kitts and Nevis	421 Besserer Street	Sandy Hill		
Saudi Arabia	201 Sussex Drive	Lower Town		
Senegal	381 Kent Street, Office 4002	Centretown		
Serbia	21 Blackburn Avenue	Sandy Hill		
Slovakia	50 Rideau Terrace	Rockcliffe Park		
Slovenia	150 Metcalfe Street, Suite 2200	Downtown		
South Africa	15 Sussex Drive	New Edinburgh		
South Korea	150 Boteler Street	Lower Town		
Spain	74 Stanley Avenue	New Edinburgh		
Sri Lanka	333 Laurier Avenue West, Suite 1204	Downtown		
Sudan	354 Stewart Street	Sandy Hill		
Sweden	377 Dalhousie Street, Suite 305	Byward Market		
Switzerland	5 Marlborough Avenue	Sandy Hill		
Syria	46 Cartier Street	Centretown		
Tanzania	50 Range Road	Sandy Hill		
Thailand	180 Island Park Drive	Wellington West/Island Park		
Togo	12 Range Road	Sandy Hill		
Trinidad and Tobago	200 First Avenue, 3rd Level	The Glebe		
Tunisia	515 O'Connor Street	The Glebe		
Turkey	197 Wurtemberg Street	Lower Town		
Uganda	350 Sparks Street, Suite 601	Downtown		
Ukraine	310 Somerset Street West	Downtown		
United Arab Emirates	125 Boteler Street	Lower Town		
United Kingdom	140 Sussex Drive	Byward Market		
United States	490 Sussex Drive	Byward Market		
Uruguay	55 Metcalfe Street, Suite 800	Downtown		
Venezuela	32 Range Road	Sandy Hill		
Vietnam	55 Mackay Street	New Edinburgh		
Yemen	54 Chamberlain Avenue	The Glebe		
Zambia	130 Albert Street, Suite 900	Downtown		
Zimbabwe	332 Somerset Street West	Centretown		

== Other missions ==
Country	Diplomatic mission	Address	Area	Image	Website
European Union	Delegation	150 Metcalfe Street, Suite 1900	Downtown		
Palestine	Delegation	18 The Driveway	Centretown		
Republic of China (Taiwan)	Economic and Cultural Office	45 O'Connor Street, Suite 1960	Downtown		

== Consular sections ==
Country	Diplomatic mission	Address	Area	Image	Website
Algeria	Consular section	435 Daly Avenue	Lower Town		
Russia	Consular section	52 Range Road	Sandy Hill		
Ukraine	Consular section	331 Metcalfe Street	Centretown		

== Countries without an embassy ==
- Andorra, U.N. Mission in New York City covers Canada
- Angola, embassy in Washington D.C. covers Canada
- Bahrain, embassy in Washington D.C. covers Canada
- Belize, embassy in Washington, D.C. covers Canada, has honorary consuls in Calgary and Vancouver
- Bhutan, U.N. Mission in New York City covers Canada, has an honorary consul in Toronto
- Botswana, embassy in Washington D.C. covers Canada, has an honorary consul in Ottawa
- Cambodia, U.N. Mission in New York City covers Canada
- Cape Verde, embassy in Washington D.C. covers Canada
- Central African Republic, embassy in Washington D.C. covers Canada
- Comoros, U.N. Mission New York City covers Canada, has an honorary consul in Burlington
- Republic of Congo, embassy in Washington D.C. covers Canada, has an honorary consul in Toronto
- Djibouti, embassy in Washington D.C. covers Canada, has a consulate in Montreal
- Equatorial Guinea, U.N. Mission in New York City covers Canada
- Eritrea, embassy in Washington D.C. covers Canada, has a consulate in Toronto
- Eswatini, embassy in Washington D.C. covers Canada
- Fiji, embassy in Washington D.C. covers Canada
- Gambia, embassy in Washington D.C. covers Canada
- Guinea Bissau, U.N. Mission in New York City covers Canada
- Iran, Interest Section of Iran through the embassy of Pakistan in Washington D.C. covers Canada
- North Korea, U.N. Mission in New York City covers Canada
- Kyrgyzstan, embassy in Washington D.C. covers Canada, has a consulate in Ottawa
- Laos, embassy in Washington D.C. covers Canada, has an honorary consul in Vancouver
- Liberia, embassy in Washington D.C. covers Canada
- Malawi, embassy in Washington D.C. covers Canada
- Maldives, U.N. Mission in New York City covers Canada
- Malta, embassy in Washington D.C. covers Canada, has a consulate general in Toronto, and honorary consuls in Montreal, St. John's, Ottawa, and Vancouver
- Marshall Islands, embassy in Washington D.C. covers Canada
- Mauritius, embassy in Washington D.C. covers Canada, has honorary consuls in Montreal, Ottawa, Toronto and Vancouver
- Monaco, embassy in Washington D.C. covers Canada, has honorary consuls general in Montreal, Toronto and an honorary consul in Vancouver
- Montenegro, embassy in Washington D.C. covers Canada, has an honorary consul in Vancouver
- Mozambique, embassy in Washington D.C. covers Canada
- Namibia, embassy in Washington D.C. covers Canada, has an honorary consul in Waterloo, Ontario
- Nicaragua, embassy in Washington D.C. covers Canada, has an honorary consul in Whitby, Ontario
- Niger, embassy in Washington D.C. covers Canada
- Oman, embassy in Washington D.C. covers Canada
- Papua New Guinea, embassy in Washington D.C. covers Canada, has an honorary consul in Toronto
- Samoa, U.N. representatives in New York City covers Canada
- San Marino, U.N. representatives in New York City covers Canada
- São Tomé and Príncipe, embassy in Washington D.C. covers Canada
- Seychelles, U.N. representatives in New York City covers Canada, has a consulate in Montreal
- Sierra Leone, embassy in Washington D.C. covers Canada, has a consulate in Ottawa
- Singapore, High Commissioner is located at the Ministry of Foreign Affairs in Singapore, has honorary consuls in Toronto and Vancouver
- Solomon Islands, U.N. Mission in New York City covers Canada, has an honorary consul in Vancouver
- Somalia, U.N. Mission in New York City covers Canada
- Suriname, embassy in Washington D.C. covers Canada, has honorary consuls in Toronto and Kelowna, British Columbia
- Tajikistan, U.N. Mission in New York City covers Canada
- Tonga, U.N. Mission in New York City covers Canada
- Tuvalu, U.N. Mission in New York City covers Canada
- Turkmenistan, embassy in Washington D.C. covers Canada
- Uzbekistan, embassy in Washington D.C. covers Canada

== See also ==
- Global Affairs Canada
- List of diplomatic missions in Canada
- List of ambassadors and high commissioners to Canada
- 1985 Turkish embassy attack in Ottawa
