= International organisation membership of Canada =

Canada is recognized as a middle power for its role in global affairs with a tendency to pursue multilateral and international solutions. The country actively promotes its domestically shared values of human rights, the rule of law and foreign aid through multiple international organizations. Canada was a founding member of the United Nations in 1945 and formed the North American Aerospace Defense Command together with the United States in 1958. The country has membership in the World Trade Organization, the Five Eyes, the G7 and the Organisation for Economic Co-operation and Development (OECD). The country joined the Organization of American States (OAS) in 1990, and seeks to expand its ties to Pacific Rim economies through membership in the Asia-Pacific Economic Cooperation forum (APEC). Canada ratified the Universal Declaration of Human Rights in 1948, and seven principal UN human rights conventions and covenants since then. As of 2023, Canada is a signatory to 15 free trade agreements with 51 different countries, and has diplomatic and consular offices in over 270 locations in approximately 180 countries. On 16 September, 2026, President of the European Commission Ursula von der Leyen invited Canada to become the first ever "associate member" of the European Union. A summit will be held to determine the details of this new status in October 2026.

Below is a list of international organizations and forums in which Canada has membership.

== Organizations, summits, and forums ==
- Agence de Coopération Culturelle et Technique
- Arctic Council
- ASEAN — dialogue partner
  - ASEAN Regional Forum
- Asia Pacific Economic Cooperation (APEC)
- Community of Democracies
- Council of Europe (observer)
- Democratic 10-D10
- Diplomatic Forum
- Euro-Atlantic Partnership Council
- European Bank for Reconstruction and Development
- European Space Agency (cooperating state)
- Food and Agriculture Organization
- G20
- Group of Seven (G7)
- Group of Eight (G8)
- Group of Ten (G10)
- International Atomic Energy Agency
- International Criminal Court
- International Hydrographic Organization
- International Indigenous Affairs
- International Mobile Satellite Organization
- International Organization for Standardization (ISO)
- International Red Cross and Red Crescent Movement
  - International Federation of Red Cross and Red Crescent Societies
- International Telecommunications Satellite Organization
- Interpol
- Multilateral Organisation Performance Assessment Network (MOPAN)
- North Atlantic Treaty Organization (NATO)
- Nuclear Suppliers Group
- Open Government Partnership
- Order of Malta
- Organisation for Economic Co-operation and Development (OECD)
  - International Energy Agency
  - Nuclear Energy Agency
- Organisation for the Prohibition of Chemical Weapons
- Organization for Security and Co-operation in Europe (OSCE)
- Organisation internationale de la Francophonie (OIF or La Francophonie)
- Organization of American States (OAS)
- Pacific Alliance
- Pacific Islands Forum (partner)
- Paris Club
- Permanent Court of Arbitration
- Southeast European Cooperative Initiative (observer)
- UNESCO
- World Customs Organization
- World Trade Organization
- Zangger Committee

== Multilateral organizations ==
- African Development Bank (AfDB) — non-regional member
- Asian Development Bank (ADB) — non-regional member
- Caribbean Development Bank (CDB)
- Commonwealth of Nations
- Consultative Group on International Agricultural Research (CGIAR)
- European Bank for Reconstruction and Development (EBRD)
- Global Alliance for Vaccines and Immunization (GAVI)
- Global Environment Facility (GEF)
- Global Fund to Fight AIDS, Tuberculosis and Malaria
- Inter-American Development Bank (IDB)
- International Cospas-Sarsat Programme (Cospas-Sarsat)
- International Fund for Agricultural Development (IFAD)
- Development Finance Institution
- International Monetary Fund (IMF)
- Red Cross and Red Crescent Movement (RCM)
  - International Federation of Red Cross and Red Crescent Societies
- United Nations
  - Joint United Nations Programme on HIV/AIDS (UNAIDS)
  - UNICEF
  - United Nations Development Programme (UNDP)
  - United Nations High Commissioner for Refugees (UNHCR)
  - United Nations Population Fund (UNFPA)
  - World Food Programme (WFP)
  - World Health Organization (WHO)
- World Bank Group (WBG)
  - International Finance Corporation (IFC)
  - International Bank for Reconstruction and Development
  - International Development Association
  - Multilateral Investment Guarantee Agency

== United Nations ==
- International Atomic Energy Agency
- International Civil Aviation Organization
- International Fund for Agricultural Development
- International Labour Organization
- International Maritime Organization
- International Monetary Fund
- International Organization for Migration
- International Telecommunication Union
- Universal Postal Union
- UNESCO
- United Nations Conference on Trade and Development
- United Nations University (UNU)
- World Health Organization
- World Intellectual Property Organization
- World Meteorological Organization
- World Tourism Organization

== International organizations and offices in Canada ==
| Organization | Base | Note |
|---|---|---|
| African Union (AU) | Washington, D.C. | Co-accredited as Permanent Representative to the United States |
| Office of the European Union | Montréal, Quebec | |
| International Atomic Energy Agency (IAEA) | Mississauga, Ontario | |
| International Civil Aviation Organization (ICAO) | Montréal, Quebec | |
| International Cospas-Sarsat Programme | Montréal, Québec | |
| Sovereign Military Order of Malta - Canadian Association | Ottawa, Ontario | |
| Taipei Economic and Cultural Office | Ottawa, Ontario | |
| Taipei Economic and Cultural Office | Toronto, Ontario | |
| Taipei Economic and Cultural Office | Vancouver, BC | |
| UNESCO Institute for Statistics | Montréal, Quebec | |
| United Nations Environment Programme (UNEP) | Montréal, Quebec | Multilateral Fund for the implementation of the Montreal Protocol Secretariat |
| United Nations High Commissioner for Refugees (UNHCR) | Ottawa, Ontario | |
| World Food Programme (WFP) | Ottawa, Ontario | |
| Commonwealth of Learning (COL) | Burnaby, BC | |
| Delegation of the Ismaili Imamat | Ottawa, Ontario | |
| Egmont Group of Financial Intelligence Units | Ottawa, Ontario | Secretariat |
| Hong Kong Economic and Trade Office (HKETO) | Toronto, Ontario | |
| Institut de la Francophonie pour le développement durable (IFDD) | Quebec City, Quebec | |
| Inter-American Institute for Cooperation on Agriculture (IICA) | Ottawa, Ontario | |
| United Nations University Institute for Water, Environment & Health (UNU-INWEH) | Hamilton, Ontario | |
| North American Commission for Environmental Cooperation (NACEC) | Montréal, Quebec | |
| Northwest Atlantic Fisheries Organization (NAFO) | Halifax, Nova Scotia | |
| North Pacific Anadromous Fish Commission (NPAFC) | Vancouver, BC | |
| Palestinian General Delegation (PGD) | Ottawa, Ontario | |
| North Pacific Marine Science Organization (PICES) | Sidney, BC | |
| Pacific Salmon Commission (PSC) | Vancouver, BC | |
| Secretariat of the Convention on Biological Diversity | Montréal, Quebec | |

== See also ==
- Foreign Affairs and International Trade Canada
- Foreign relations of Canada
- List of country groupings
