= Sandy Hill, Ottawa =

Sandy Hill
- Neighbourhood
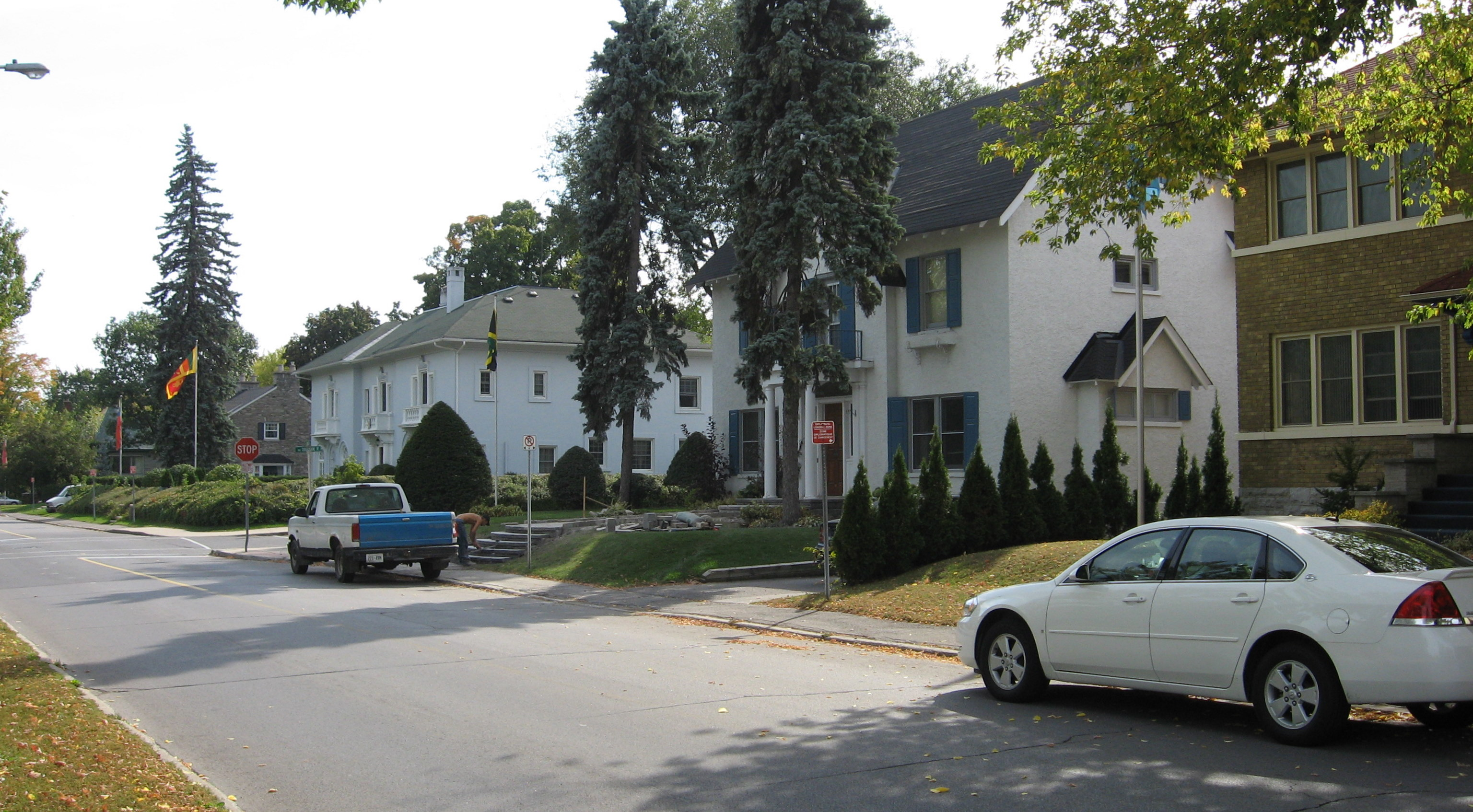
- Embassy Row on Range Road

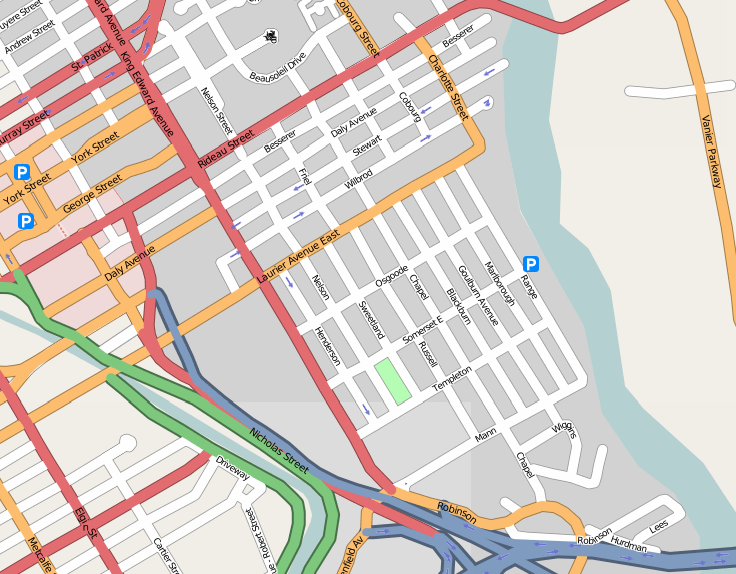

- Location of Sandy Hill in Ottawa
- Coordinates: 45°25′30″N 75°40′30″W
- Country: Canada
- Province: Ontario
- City: Ottawa

Government
  - MPs: Mona Fortier
  - MPPs: Lucille Collard
  - Councillors: Stéphanie Plante
- Elevation: 70 m (230 ft)

Population (2011)
  - Total: 12,490
- Canada 2011 Census
- Time zone: UTC-5 (Eastern (EST))

Sandy Hill (French: Côte-de-Sable) is a neighbourhood in Ottawa, Ontario, located just east of downtown. The neighbourhood is bordered on the west by the Rideau Canal, and on the east by the Rideau River. To the north it stretches to Rideau Street and the Byward Market area while to the south it is bordered by the Queensway highway and Nicholas Street. The area is named for its hilliness, caused by the river, and its sandy soil, which makes it difficult to erect large buildings. It is home to a number of embassies, residences and parks. Le Cordon Bleu operates its Canadian school there, at the opposite end of Sandy Hill from the University of Ottawa.

According to the 2011 Canadian Census, the population of Sandy Hill was 12,490.

== History ==
Sandy Hill was, during the nineteenth and early twentieth century, Ottawa's wealthiest neighbourhood. Originally the estate of Louis-Théodore Besserer, who donated part of this land to University of Ottawa, it was subdivided and became home to most of Ottawa's lumber barons. When Ottawa became the country's capital, it became home to senior public servants and to the Prime Minister who lived at Stadacona Hall and later at what is now known as Laurier House.

The construction of bridges over the canal and the introduction of automobiles and streetcars made the area much more accessible to downtown, and it began to decline as the very wealthy moved to Rockcliffe Park. The neighbourhood became much denser and more middle class. It was predominantly francophone, and the 1960s Radio-Canada television network drama "La Côte de Sable" was set there, to this day one of the network's only drama set outside Quebec.

The area saw much growth at the end of the Second World War as the baby boom increased the population and the nearby federal government began hiring. Many of the once grand mansions became embassies. Many nations still have their embassies in Sandy Hill, including Russia and many African nations, whose embassies are clustered near the Rideau River. Currently, many students live in the area due to its proximity to the University of Ottawa.

== Geography ==
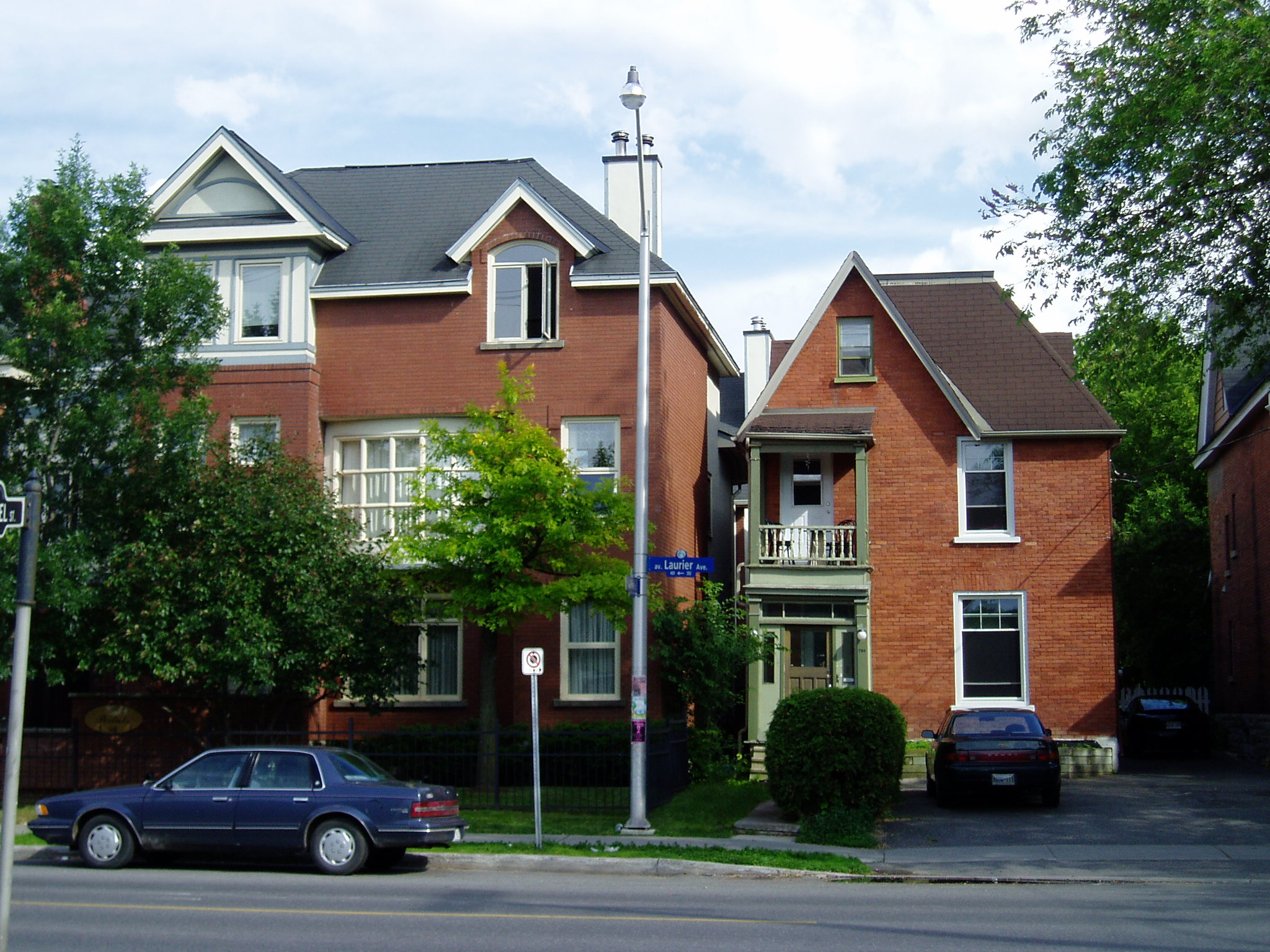
A pair of houses on Laurier Ave. E. Many of the large older buildings in Sandy Hill have been converted into apartments.

Sandy Hill is often divided into four geographical areas. North Sandy Hill, consisting of the area north of Laurier Avenue, is much older, with many of its buildings dating from the nineteenth century. However, area is subject to the influences of more recent developments on the thoroughfare of Rideau Street. South Sandy Hill, consisting of the area south of Laurier Avenue and north of Mann Avenue, was largely built after the Second World War, though there are a number of much older structures. The area south of South Sandy Hill is known as Strathcona Heights, and consists almost entirely of low-rise subsidized or cooperative apartment buildings, having been completely redeveloped in the early 1990s. The area south of the Strathcona Heights escarpment is known as Robinson village. It was cut off from other neighbourhoods when highways were built, and contains low-rise houses and light industry.

== Demographics ==
Sandy Hill's demographics change dramatically across a few blocks. While the area is generally wealthier on the eastern side—which is closer to the embassies and the Rideau River—the western side, which is closer to the university, has a more diverse economic makeup with more students, senior citizens, and new immigrants.

Housing in the western end of Sandy Hill includes boarding houses, student rental housing, modest privately owned homes and cooperative housing. For example, on Henderson Avenue, a historically Irish working-class sector of Sandy Hill, there are two Housing Cooperatives: Sandy Hill Housing Co-op and St. Georges Housing Cooperative / la Coopérative d'habitation St Georges, a bilingual, multicultural coop, with residents who come from Canada, with neighbours newly arrived from Ghana, DR Congo, Morocco, Rwanda, Burundi, Poland and several Middle Eastern countries. These Coops not only provided attractive low-rise multi-housing mixed income communities but also contributed to the restoration of the heritage homes on this street and won awards for their contribution to Sandy Hill's heritage restoration.

The Sandy Hill area is split about equally between the anglophone and the francophone population, with large communities from Somalia, Lebanon, and Haiti. The area is very close to downtown, especially to the Rideau Centre, a large downtown shopping mall. The area is well served by mass transit, and O-Train Line 1 serves the University of Ottawa.

== Notable sites ==
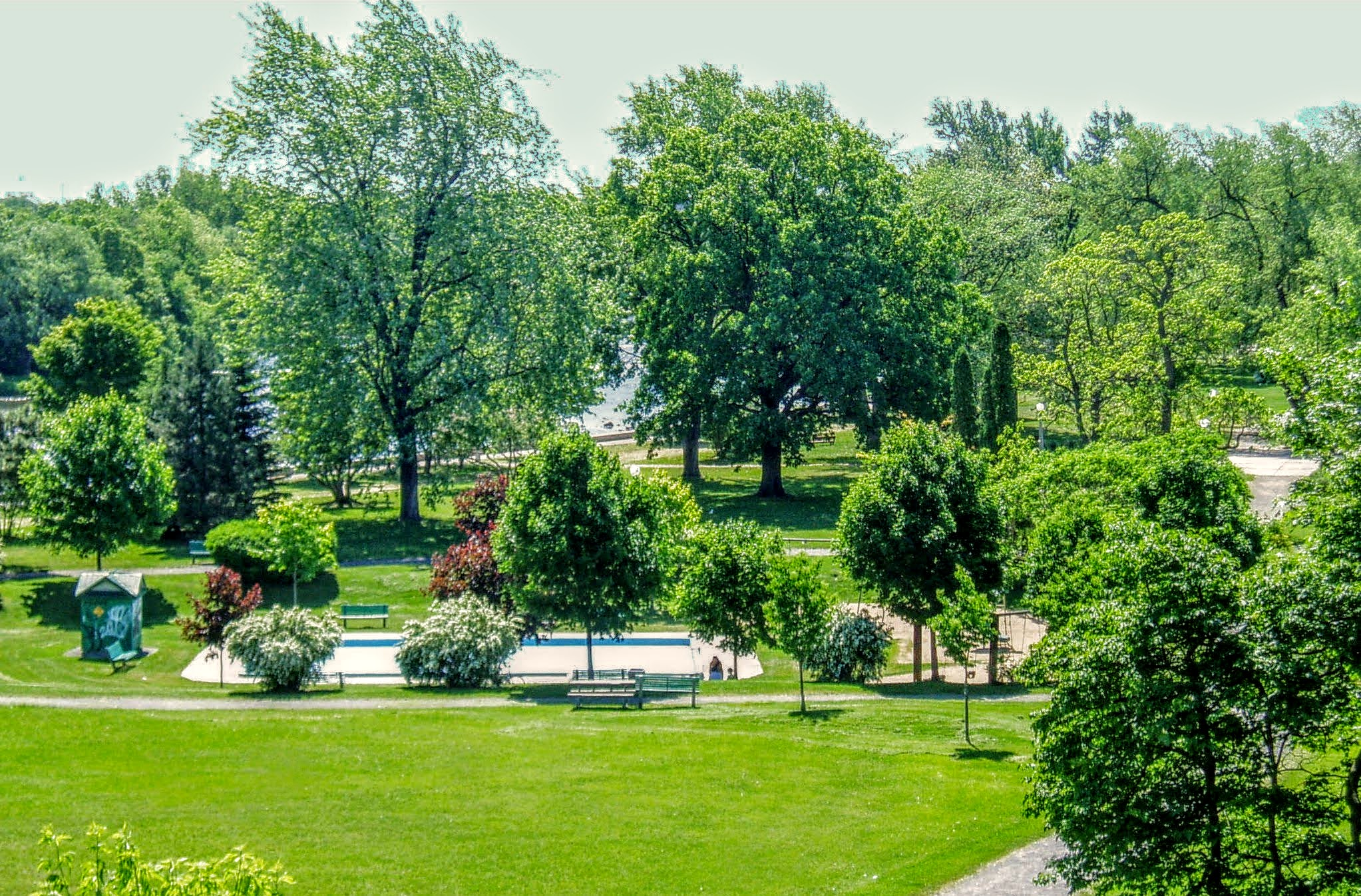
Strathcona Park (Ottawa)

- Laurier House
- University of Ottawa
- Strathcona Park
- Heritage Canada, 5 Blackburn
- Amnesty International, Canadian headquarters
- Examination Unit, a secretive unit of the National Research Council (Canada) and later became Communications Security Establishment, was located at a house near Laurier House.

== Notable residents ==
By virtue of its proximity to Parliament Hill, many past residents of Sandy Hill have been politicians.

- Julian Armour - Musician
- Ed Broadbent - NDP Leader
- John Diefenbaker - Prime Minister
- T.C. Douglas - NDP Leader
- Sandford Fleming - Engineer and inventor
- Max Keeping - Television News Anchor
- William Lyon Mackenzie King - Prime Minister
- Wilfrid Laurier - Prime Minister
- John A. Macdonald - Prime Minister
- Lester B. Pearson - Prime Minister
- Elizabeth Smart - Author
- Shirley Thomson - Director, National Gallery of Canada; Director, Canada Council for the Arts
- Kurt Waldheim - UN Secretary General, Austrian Ambassador to Canada
- Bill Westwick - Ottawa Journal sports editor
- Alexander Yakovlev - so-called 'Godfather of Glasnost'

== Embassies ==
The large homes built by the lumber barons are today popular locations for embassies and many countries are represented in the neighbourhood:

- Algerian embassy (Fleck/Paterson House)
- Austrian embassy
- Brazilian embassy
- Bruneian embassy (Stadacona Hall)
- Bulgarian embassy
- Burkinabé embassy
- Congolese embassy
- Ivoirian embassy
- Croatian embassy (Toller House)
- Gabonian embassy
- Guinean embassy
- Jamaican High Commission
- Kenyan High Commission
- Malian embassy
- Moroccan embassy
- Myanma embassy
- Nigerien embassy
- Pakistani High Commission
- Polish embassy
- Russian embassy
- Senegalese embassy
- Serbian embassy
- Sudanese embassy
- Swiss embassy
- Tanzanian High Commission
- Togolese embassy
- Ugandan High Commission
- Venezuelan embassy
- Vietnamese embassy

== Churches ==
- All Nations Church
- All Saints Anglican Church
- Eglise Sacré-Coeur
- St. Alban's Anglican Church
- St. Clement Catholic Church
- St. Paul's-Eastern United Church
- St. Joseph's Catholic Church
- St. Paul Lutheran Church

== See also ==
- List of Ottawa neighbourhoods
