= High Commission of Brunei, Ottawa =

Diplomatic establishment

High Commission of Brunei Darussalam in Ottawa
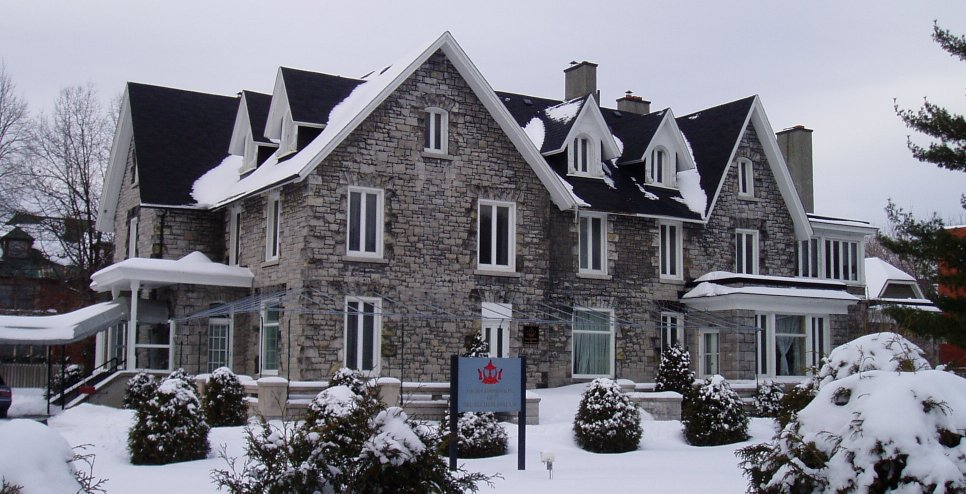
- Location: Sandy Hill, Ottawa
- Address: 395 Laurier Avenue East
- Coordinates: 45.428539°N 75.676360°W
- Website: Official website

The High Commission of Brunei Darussalam in Canada is located in Ottawa, Ontario, Canada, in the Sandy Hill neighbourhood at 395 Laurier Avenue East in the historic building known as Stadacona Hall.

== History ==
Stadacona Hall was built in 1871 by a local lumber baron, John Cameron. He did not reside in the house long himself, but rented it out to other notables. The first tenant was the Speaker of the Senate of Canada, Joseph-Édouard Cauchon. The building was named by Cauchon's wife after Stadacona, the First Nations name for their native Quebec City.

It then became home to Prime Minister Sir John A. Macdonald and his family, who lived there from 1878 to 1883 before moving to Earnscliffe. It later became home to other prominent individuals, including Sir Frederick Borden and William Rowley.

After World War II, it was purchased by the Kingdom of Belgium and became the residence of the Belgian ambassador. In 1995, downsizing led them to put it on the market for $1.7 million. It was bought by the Government of Brunei Darussalam, which uses the building as its High Commission.

== List of high commissioners ==
Diplomatic agrément/Diplomatic accreditation	High Commissioner	Observations	Prime Minister of Brunei	Prime Minister of Canada	Term end
10 January 1998	Colonel (Retired) Dato Seri Laila Jocklin bin Kongpaw		Hassanal Bolkiah	Jean Chrétien	2001
2001	Dato Paduka Haji Abdul Aziz bin Muhammad		Hassanal Bolkiah	Jean Chrétien	2004
15 March 2005	Datin Paduka Magdalene Teo Chee Siong	The high commissioner was one of the players in the continuing investigation into the Senate scandal by the Royal Canadian Mounted Police.	Hassanal Bolkiah	Paul Martin	2007
18 June 2008	Datin Paduka Hajah Rakiah binti Haji Abdul Lamit	Prince Al-Muhtadee Billah and Princess Sarah arrived in Ottawa on an official visit from 15 to 17 September 2011.	Hassanal Bolkiah	Stephen Harper	2012
13 September 2014	Pengiran Haji Kamal Bashah bin Pengiran Haji Ahmad	On the invitation of Global Affairs Canada, Princess Masna arrived in Ottawa on 2 April 2017.	Hassanal Bolkiah	Stephen Harper	2023

== See also ==
- List of designated heritage properties in Ottawa
- List of embassies and high commissions in Ottawa
