= Canada–Indonesia relations =

- Canada: Indonesia

Diplomatic mission
- Embassy of Canada, Jakarta: Embassy of Indonesia, Ottawa

Envoy
- Ambassador Jess Dutton: Ambassador Muhsin Syihab

Canada and Indonesia established diplomatic relations in 1952. Canada and Indonesia are partners in a number of multilateral organizations, such as Asia-Pacific Economic Cooperation (APEC), the G-20, Cairns Group, and the World Trade Organization (WTO).

== History ==
Relations between the two countries began in 1948, when Indonesia was struggling to gain international recognition for its independence from its former colonizers since 1945. Canada, through General Andrew McNaughton as the President of the United Nations' Security Council, managed to break the deadlock in the negotiation on resolving the conflict between Indonesia and the Netherlands that resulted in the adoption of Resolution 67/1949, which endorsed the establishment of a Dutch–Indonesian Round Table Conference. Tripartite negotiations lead to the international recognition of Indonesia's sovereignty in December 1949.

Furthermore, Indonesia-Canada diplomatic relations formally began when the two countries signed an agreement to open diplomatic missions in their respective capitals on October 9th, 1952. Relations have been generally cordial. Both countries shared similar views on the Archipelagic state principle during negotiations on the United Nations Convention on the Law of the Sea. Indonesia and Canada were both members of the International Commission of Control and Supervision in Vietnam.

== Economic Development Cooperation ==
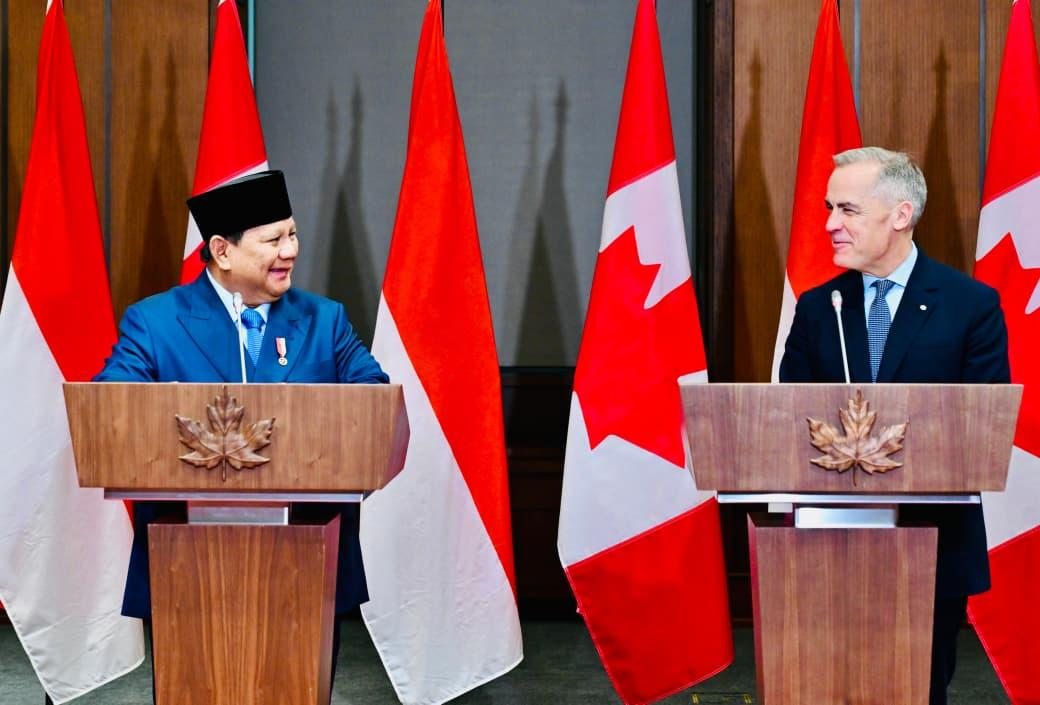
Canadian Prime Minister Mark Carney and Indonesian President Prabowo Subianto in Parliament Hill

Canada and Indonesia enjoy strong trade relations. Indonesia is one of Canada’s largest merchandise trading partner with total two-way merchandise trade of $5.1 billion in 2023. Canada’s exports to Indonesia were worth $2.3 billion and Canada’s imports to Indonesia were worth $2.8 billion. Exports and imports of products in this trade include manufactured goods, agricultural products, and natural resources.

Canada also has significant investment interests in Indonesia, with Canadian direct investment valued at $6.7 billion in 2023, making it the second largest destination for known Canadian direct investment in the region. The major sector both by number of projects and investment value is the mining industry. The largest number of Canadian investment projects are on the island of Java, but the largest dollar value of investment is located in Sulawesi.

On 24 September 2025, Canadian Prime Minister Mark Carney and Indonesian President Prabowo Subianto signed the Canada-Indonesia Comprehensive Economic Partnership Agreement (CEPA) which aims to remove or lessen tariff and non-tariff trade and investment barriers, make trade and investment more transparent and predictable, and provide new opportunities for Canadian industries and workers in industries like financial services, infrastructure, clean technology, agri-food, and critical minerals.

As a development partner, Canada works closely with Indonesia to support sustainable economic growth and reduce vulnerability to poverty. The Canadian International Development Agency (CIDA) managed Canada's bilateral program for development assistance to Indonesia until it was folded into Global Affairs Canada. CIDA made Indonesia a major "country of concentration" for Canadian development cooperation, with Indonesia ranked as high as second place among Canadian aid recipients in the 1980s.

== Resident diplomatic missions ==
- Canada has an embassy in Jakarta.
- Indonesia has an embassy in Ottawa and consulates-general in Toronto and Vancouver.
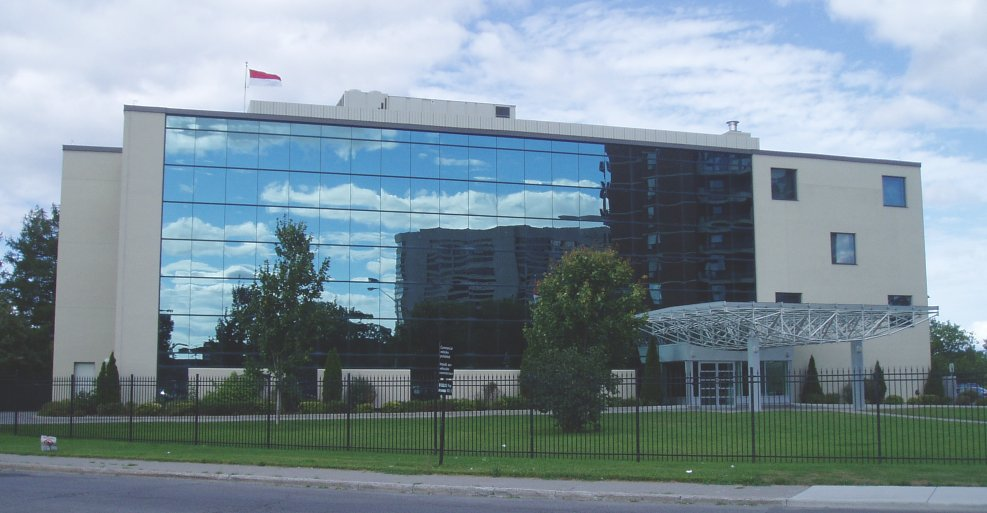
Embassy of Indonesia in Ottawa

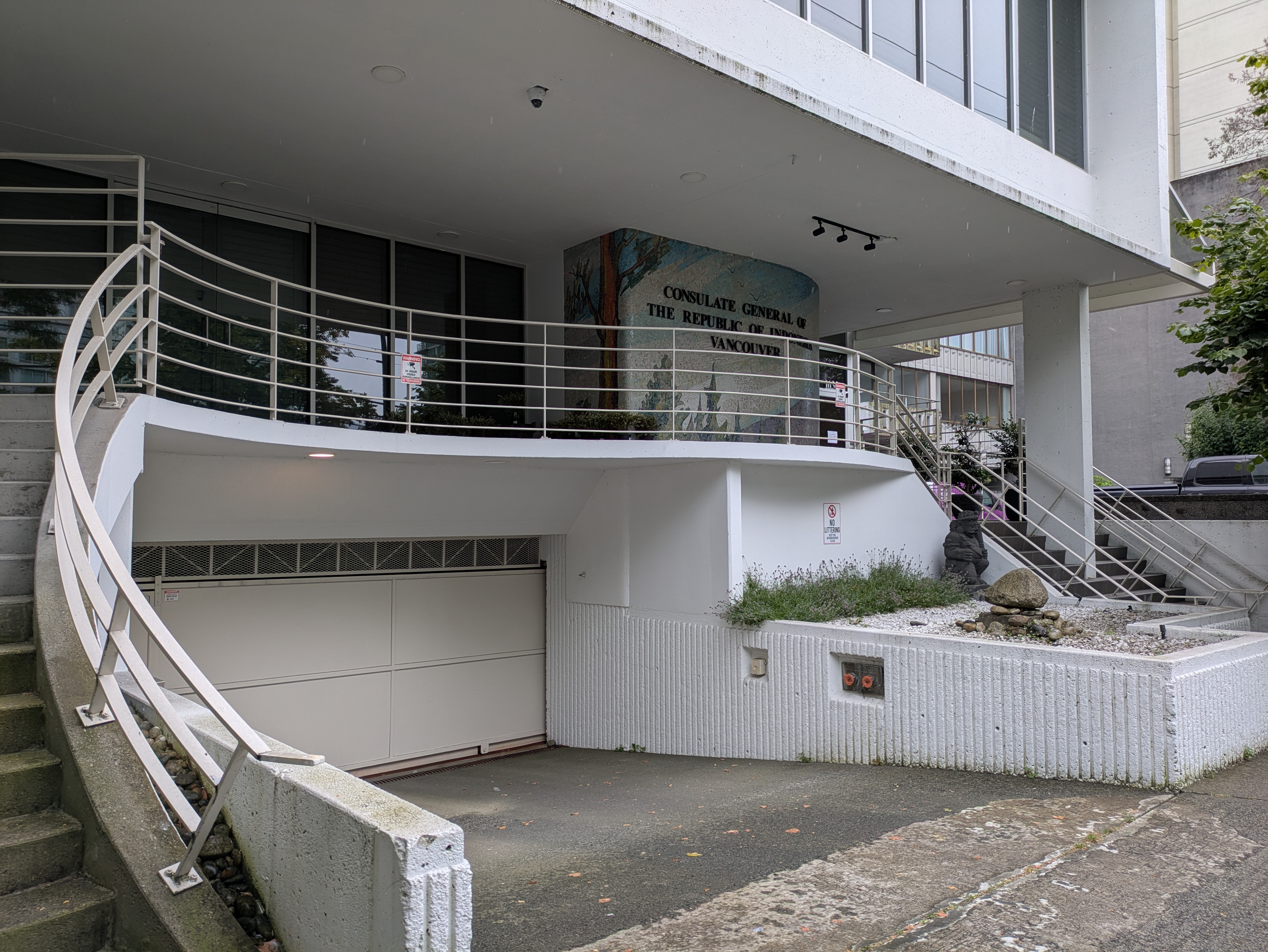
Consulate-General in Vancouver

== See also ==
- Indonesian Canadian
