= Canada–Norway relations =

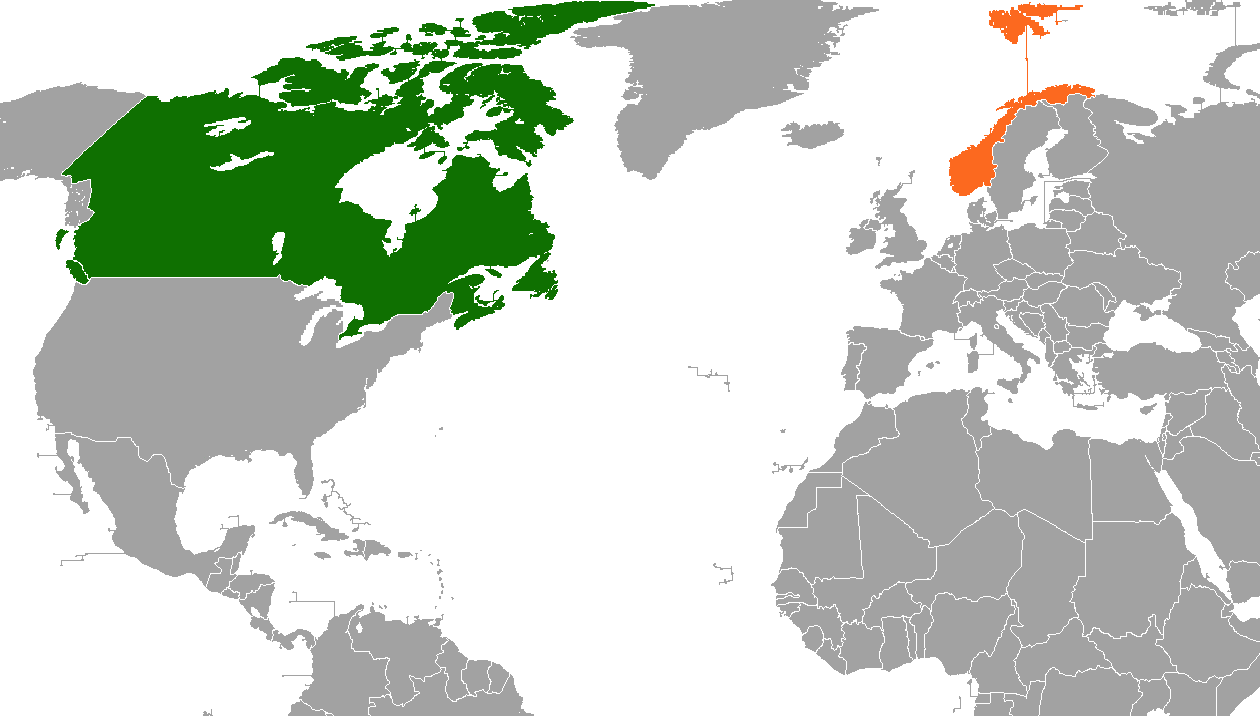

- Canada: Norway

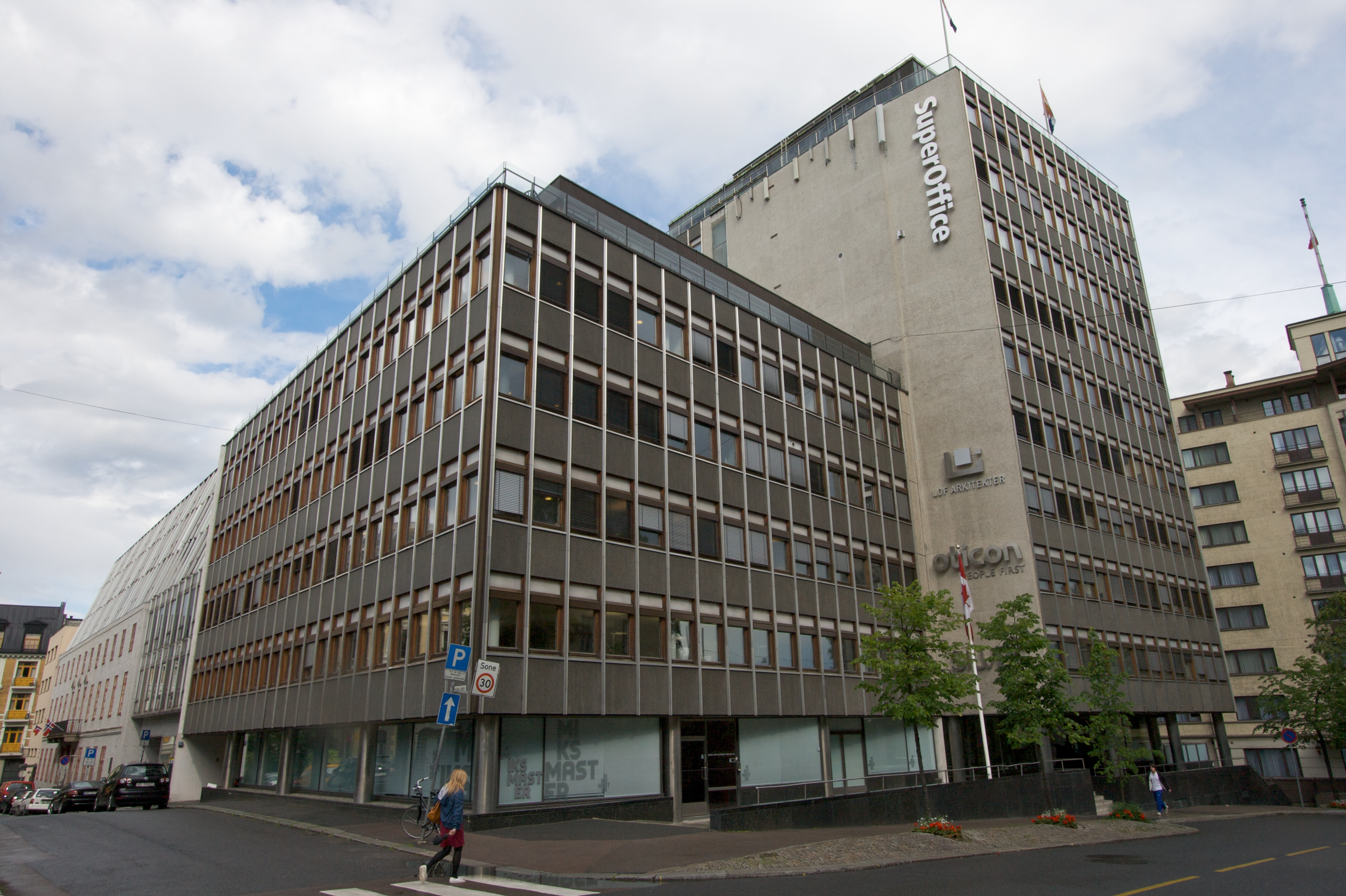
The Canadian embassy in Norway

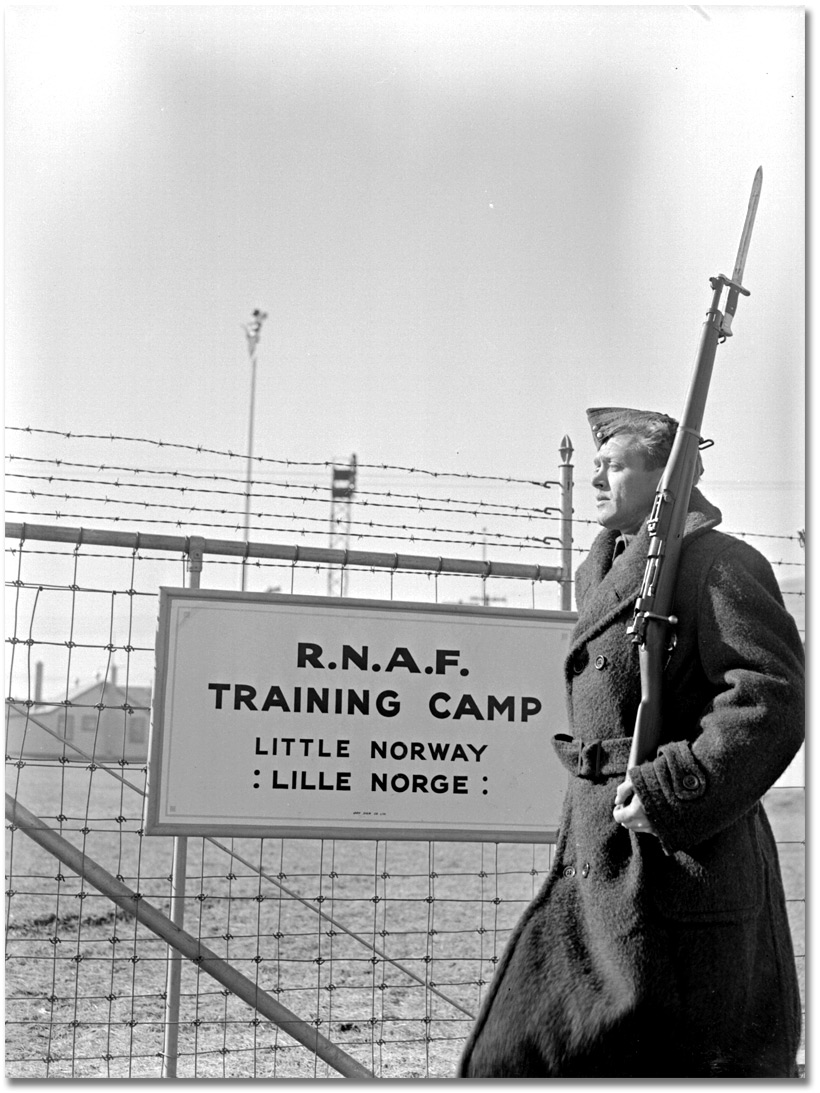
Little Norway, a Norwegian Army Air Service/Royal Norwegian Air Force training camp in Canada during the Second World War

Canada and Norway first established foreign relations in 1942. As NATO allies and multilateral partners, Canada and Norway have had a long history of cooperation on regional and global terror issues, such as the War in Afghanistan.

== History ==
The very first Europeans to reach North America were Norsemen, who made at least one major effort at settlement at L'Anse aux Meadows in Newfoundland around 1000 AD. Snorri Thorfinnsson, or Snorri Guðriðsson, was the son of Thorfinn Karlsefni and his wife Guđriđ. He is thought to be the first European baby born in North America.

On May 29, 1914, in the middle of the night, the Norwegian cargo ship Storstad and the Canadian passenger liner RMS Empress of Ireland collided. While Storstad did not sink, Empress of Ireland went down to the bottom of the St. Lawrence River. 1,012 lives were lost while 465 people survived.

Little Norway was a Norwegian Army Air Service/Royal Norwegian Air Force training camp in Canada during World War II. Camp Norway in Lunenburg, Nova Scotia was the naval training camp.

During the Cold War, Canadian troops were stationed in Norway as part of the NATO alliance. The Canadian Air-Sea Transportable Brigade Group was assigned to reinforce Norway in the case of a general war in Europe.

== Diplomatic ties ==
Canada has an embassy in Oslo and a consulate in Stavanger. Norway has an embassy in Ottawa and four consulates-general in Calgary, Montreal, Toronto and Vancouver, as well as honorary consuls in most provincial capitals.

Both countries are full members of the Arctic Council, of the Organization for Security and Co-operation in Europe, of NATO and of the Organisation for Economic Co-operation and Development.

== Past immigration ==
There are 433,000 people of Norwegian descent living in Canada.

== See also ==
- Foreign relations of Canada
- Foreign relations of Norway
- Embassy of Canada in Oslo
- Embassy of Norway in Ottawa
- Canadians of Norwegian descent
