= Diplomatic Forum =

The Diplomatic Forum is a Canadian government organization of countries which have diplomatic relations with Canada, including Commonwealth members. The organization was created by Foreign Affairs and International Trade Canada in 1997 to help those countries to understand Canada's foreign policies.
