= High Commission of the United Kingdom, Ottawa =

Diplomatic mission of the United Kingdom to Canada

British High Commission in Ottawa Haut-commissariat britannique à Ottawa
- Location: 140 Sussex Drive; Ottawa, Ontario, Canada
- Coordinates: 45.4375°N 75.6991°W
- Jurisdiction: Canada
- High Commissioner: Rob Tinline
- Website: British High Commission, Ottawa

The British High Commission in Ottawa (French: Haut-commissariat britannique à Ottawa) is the main diplomatic mission of the United Kingdom in Canada. It is located at 140 Sussex Drive in Ottawa, across the street from Global Affairs Canada (GAC).

== History ==
The High Commissioner's position was created in 1928 after the Balfour Declaration of 1926 and was the first such posting for Britain. The present High Commissioner is Rob Tinline. The UK has Consulates-General in Toronto, Montreal, Calgary, and Vancouver. It has Honorary Consuls in St. John's, Halifax, Quebec City, and Winnipeg. The High Commission also represents the British Overseas Territories in Canada.

The High Commissioner resides at Earnscliffe, a mansion on the Ottawa River.

In 2019, the UK Government announced a new building would be constructed for the High Commission, on property next to Earnscliffe. The new building opened on 4 September 2024.

The former High Commission building at 80 Elgin Street, was sold to the National Capital Commission in 2022 and is now under renovation. The building was opened in 1964 and designed by Eric Bedford. Previously the site had been home to the Union Hotel, founded in the 1850s but demolished in 1962.

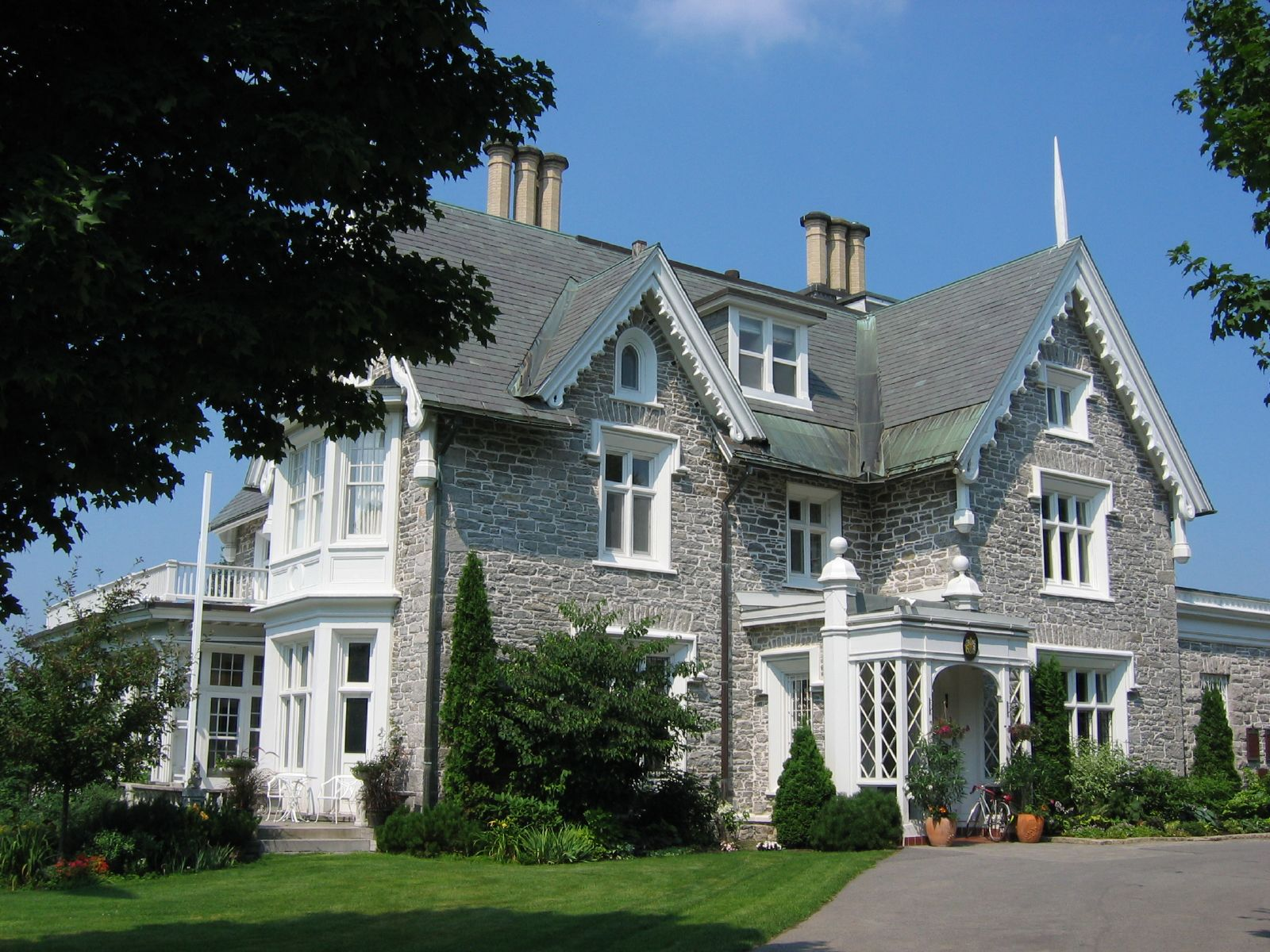
Earnscliffe, residence of the High Commissioner

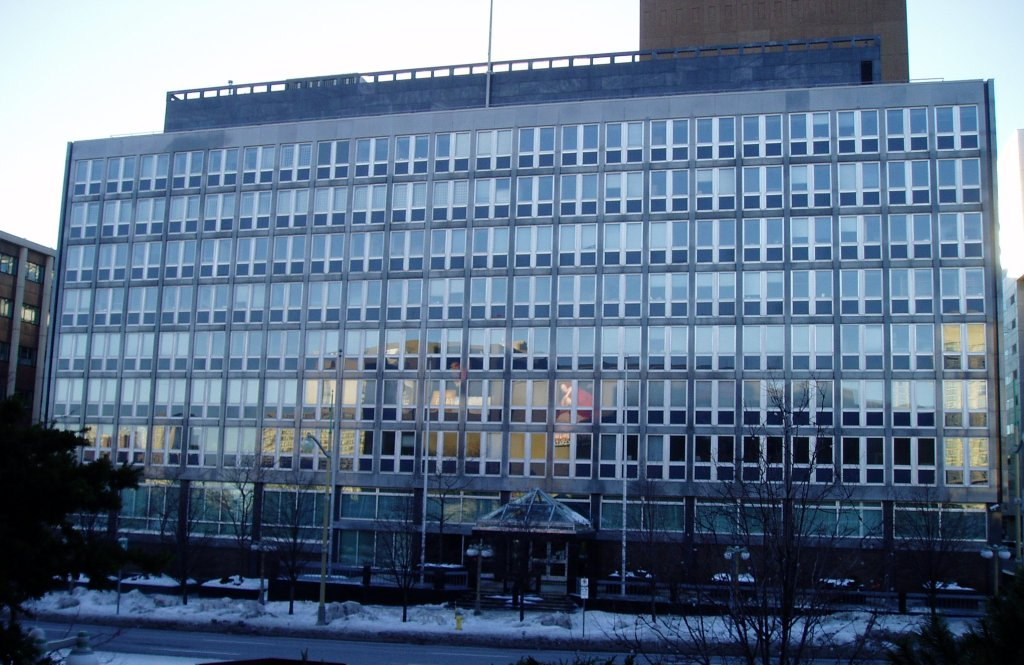
80 Elgin Street, former High Commission building (1964-2022)

== See also ==
- Canada–United Kingdom relations
- Diplomatic missions in Canada
- List of high commissioners of the United Kingdom to Canada
