= List of diplomatic missions in Canada =

At present, the capital city of Ottawa hosts 129 embassies/high commissions. Several other countries accredit their embassies and missions in the United States to Canada.

This listing excludes honorary consulates.

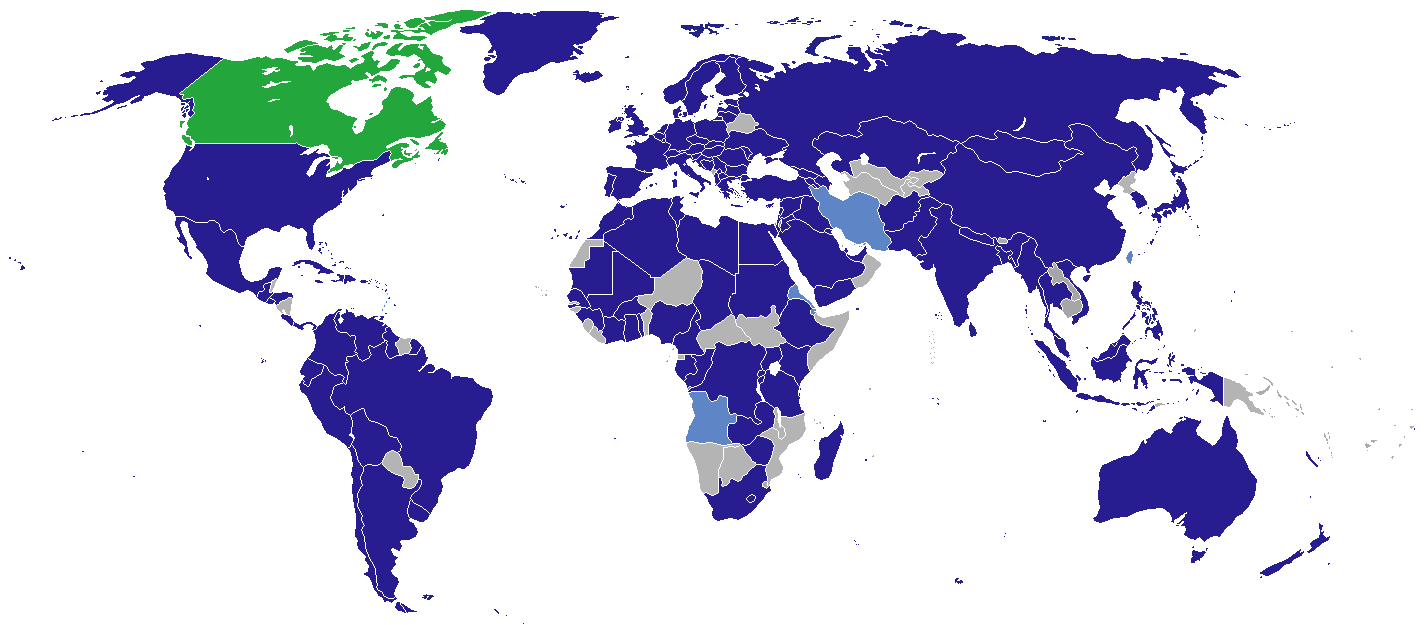
Map of diplomatic missions in Canada

== Diplomatic missions in Ottawa ==
=== Embassies/High Commissions ===
Entries marked with an asterisk (*) are member-states of the Commonwealth of Nations. As such, their embassies are formally termed as "high commissions".

1. Afghanistan
2. Albania
3. Algeria
4. Argentina
5. Armenia
6. Australia*
7. Austria
8. Azerbaijan
9. Bahamas*
10. Bangladesh*
11. Barbados*
12. Belgium
13. Bolivia
14. Bosnia and Herzegovina
15. Brazil
16. Brunei*
17. Bulgaria
18. Burkina Faso
19. Burundi
20. Cameroon
21. Chad
22. Chile
23. China
24. Colombia
25. Congo-Brazzaville
26. Congo-Kinshasa
27. Costa Rica
28. Croatia
29. Cuba
30. Cyprus*
31. Czech Republic
32. Denmark
33. Dominican Republic
34. Ecuador
35. Egypt
36. El Salvador
37. Estonia
38. Ethiopia
39. Finland
40. France
41. Gabon*
42. Georgia
43. Germany
44. Ghana*
45. Greece
46. Guatemala
47. Guinea
48. Guyana
49. Haiti
50. Holy See
51. Honduras
52. Hungary
53. Iceland
54. India*
55. Indonesia
56. Iraq
57. Ireland
58. Israel
59. Italy
60. Ivory Coast
61. Jamaica*
62. Japan
63. Jordan
64. Kazakhstan
65. Kenya*
66. Kosovo
67. Kuwait
68. Latvia
69. Lebanon
70. Lesotho*
71. Libya
72. Lithuania
73. Luxembourg
74. Madagascar
75. Malaysia*
76. Mali
77. Malta
78. Mauritania
79. Mexico
80. Moldova
81. Mongolia
82. Morocco
83. Myanmar
84. Nepal
85. Netherlands
86. New Zealand*
87. Nigeria*
88. North Macedonia
89. Norway
90. Pakistan
91. Panama
92. Peru
93. Philippines
94. Poland
95. Portugal
96. Qatar
97. Romania
98. Russia
99. Rwanda*
100. Saint Kitts and Nevis*
101. Saudi Arabia
102. Senegal
103. Serbia
104. Slovakia
105. Slovenia
106. South Africa*
107. South Korea
108. Spain
109. Sri Lanka*
110. Sudan
111. Sweden
112. Switzerland
113. Tanzania*
114. Thailand
115. Togo*
116. Trinidad and Tobago*
117. Tunisia
118. Turkey
119. Uganda*
120. Ukraine
121. United Arab Emirates
122. United Kingdom*
123. United States
124. Uruguay
125. Venezuela
126. Vietnam
127. Yemen
128. Zambia*
129. Zimbabwe

=== Other delegations or missions ===
1. European Union (Delegation)
2. Iran (Interest Section) (Note: Under the protecting power of Switzerland.)
3. Palestine (Embassy - To Open)
4. Republic of China (Taiwan) (Representative Office)

== Consular Missions ==
The following cities are host to career consular missions. All are consulates-general unless otherwise indicated.

=== Calgary, Alberta ===
1. China
2. Colombia
3. El Salvador
4. Japan
5. Mexico (Consulate)
6. Philippines
7. United Kingdom
8. United States

=== Edmonton, Alberta ===
1. Italy (Consular post)
2. Ukraine

=== Halifax, Nova Scotia ===
1. United States

=== Leamington, Ontario ===
- Mexico (Consulate)

=== Moncton, New Brunswick ===
1. France

=== Montreal, Quebec ===
1. Algeria
2. Argentina
3. Belgium
4. Brazil
5. Chile
6. China
7. Colombia
8. Cuba
9. Dominican Republic
10. Egypt
11. El Salvador
12. France
13. Germany
14. Greece
15. Guatemala
16. Haiti
17. Honduras (Consulate)
18. Hungary
19. Iraq
20. Israel
21. Italy
22. Japan
23. Lebanon
24. Mexico
25. Morocco
26. Norway
27. Pakistan
28. Panama
29. Peru
30. Poland
31. Portugal
32. Romania
33. Russia
34. South Korea
35. Spain
36. Switzerland
37. Republic of China (Taiwan) (Office)
38. Tunisia (Consulate)
39. Turkey
40. United Kingdom
41. United States
42. Uruguay

=== Quebec City, Quebec ===
- France
- United States

=== Toronto, Ontario ===
1. Afghanistan
2. Angola
3. Antigua and Barbuda
4. Argentina
5. Australia
6. Bahamas
7. Bangladesh
8. Barbados
9. Brazil
10. Bulgaria
11. Chile
12. China
13. Colombia
14. Croatia
15. Cuba
16. Czech Republic
17. Denmark
18. Dominican Republic
19. Ecuador
20. El Salvador
21. Eritrea
22. France
23. Germany
24. Ghana
25. Greece
26. Grenada
27. Guatemala
28. Hong Kong (Trade Office)
29. Hungary
30. India
31. Indonesia
32. Iraq
33. Ireland
34. Israel
35. Italy
36. Jamaica
37. Japan
38. Kazakhstan (Consulate)
39. Kosovo
40. Malta
41. Mexico
42. Morocco
43. Netherlands
44. North Macedonia
45. Pakistan
46. Panama
47. Peru
48. Philippines
49. Poland
50. Portugal
51. Romania
52. Russia
53. Saint Lucia
54. Saint Vincent and the Grenadines
55. Serbia
56. South Africa
57. South Korea
58. Spain
59. Sri Lanka
60. Republic of China (Taiwan) (Office)
61. Trinidad and Tobago
62. Turkey
63. Ukraine
64. United Kingdom
65. United States
66. Uruguay

=== Vancouver, British Columbia ===
1. Afghanistan
2. Argentina
3. Brazil
4. Chile
5. China
6. Colombia
7. El Salvador
8. France
9. Germany
10. Greece
11. Guatemala
12. Hong Kong (Trade Office)
13. Hungary (Vice-consulate)
14. India
15. Indonesia
16. Ireland
17. Italy
18. Japan
19. Malaysia
20. Mexico
21. Netherlands
22. New Zealand
23. Pakistan
24. Panama
25. Peru
26. Philippines
27. Poland
28. Portugal
29. Romania
30. South Korea
31. Switzerland
32. Republic of China (Taiwan) (Office)
33. Thailand
34. Turkey
35. United Kingdom
36. United States
37. Vietnam

=== Winnipeg, Manitoba ===
- El Salvador
- Iceland
- United States (Consulate)

== Accredited Embassies and High Commissions ==
=== Resident in Washington, D.C., United States ===
1. Angola
2. Antigua and Barbuda
3. Bahrain
4. Belize
5. Benin
6. Botswana
7. Cape Verde
8. Central African Republic
9. Djibouti
10. Equatorial Guinea
11. Eritrea
12. Eswatini
13. Fiji
14. Gambia
15. Grenada
16. Kyrgyzstan
17. Laos
18. Liberia
19. Malawi
20. Maldives
21. Marshall Islands
22. Mauritius
23. Micronesia
24. Monaco
25. Montenegro
26. Mozambique
27. Namibia
28. Nicaragua
29. Niger
30. Oman
31. Palau
32. Papua New Guinea
33. Paraguay
34. Saint Lucia
35. Saint Vincent and the Grenadines
36. Sierra Leone
37. Somalia
38. South Sudan
39. Suriname
40. Tajikistan
41. Timor-Leste
42. Turkmenistan
43. Uzbekistan

=== Resident in New York City, United States ===
Accredited missions are the sending countries' permanent missions to the United Nations.

1. Andorra
2. Bhutan
3. Cambodia
4. Comoros
5. Kiribati
6. Nauru
7. North Korea
8. Samoa
9. San Marino
10. São Tomé and Príncipe
11. Seychelles
12. Solomon Islands
13. Tonga
14. Tuvalu

=== Resident elsewhere ===
1. Singapore (Singapore)
2. Dominica (Unknown)

== Closed missions ==
Host city	Sending country	Mission	Year closed	Ref.
Ottawa	Angola	Embassy (Note: Resident in Washington, D.C., United States)	2018	
Ottawa	Belarus	Embassy	2021	
Ottawa	Benin	Embassy	2019	
Ottawa	East Germany	Embassy	1990	
Ottawa	Iran	Embassy (Note: Under the protecting power of Switzerland.)	2012	
Ottawa	Malawi	High Commission	2005	
Ottawa	Niger	Embassy	Unknown	
Ottawa	Paraguay	Embassy	2025	
Ottawa	Swaziland (Note: The high commission closed down prior to the renaming of Swaziland into Eswatini in 2018.)	High Commission	1999	
Ottawa	Syria	Embassy	2012	
Calgary	France	Consulate-General	2013	
Edmonton	France	Consulate	1996	
Edmonton	Japan	Consulate-General	2005	
Hamilton	Italy	Vice-consulate	2000	
Montreal	Czech Republic	Consulate-General	2010	
Montreal	South Africa	Consulate-General	2002	
Montreal	Sweden	Consulate-General	1993	
Montreal	Venezuela	Consulate-General	2019	
Toronto	Belgium	Consulate-General	2014	
Toronto	New Zealand	Consulate General	1982	
Toronto	Sweden	Consulate-General	1993	
Toronto	United Arab Emirates	Consulate General	Unknown (Note: Most likely closed somewhere between in 2014 - the year of its establishment - and 2026.)	
Toronto	Venezuela	Consulate-General	2019	
Vancouver	Norway	Consulate-General	2017	
Vancouver	Sweden	Consulate	1991	
Vancouver	Venezuela	Consulate-General	2019	
Winnipeg	Philippines	Consulate-General	1985	

== See also ==
- Foreign relations of Canada
- List of diplomatic missions of Canada
- List of embassies and high commissions in Ottawa
- List of ambassadors and high commissioners to Canada
- Visa requirements for Canadian citizens
