= Constitution Square, Ottawa =

Office complex in Ottawa, Ontario, Canada

Coordinates: 45.418279°N 75.702968°W

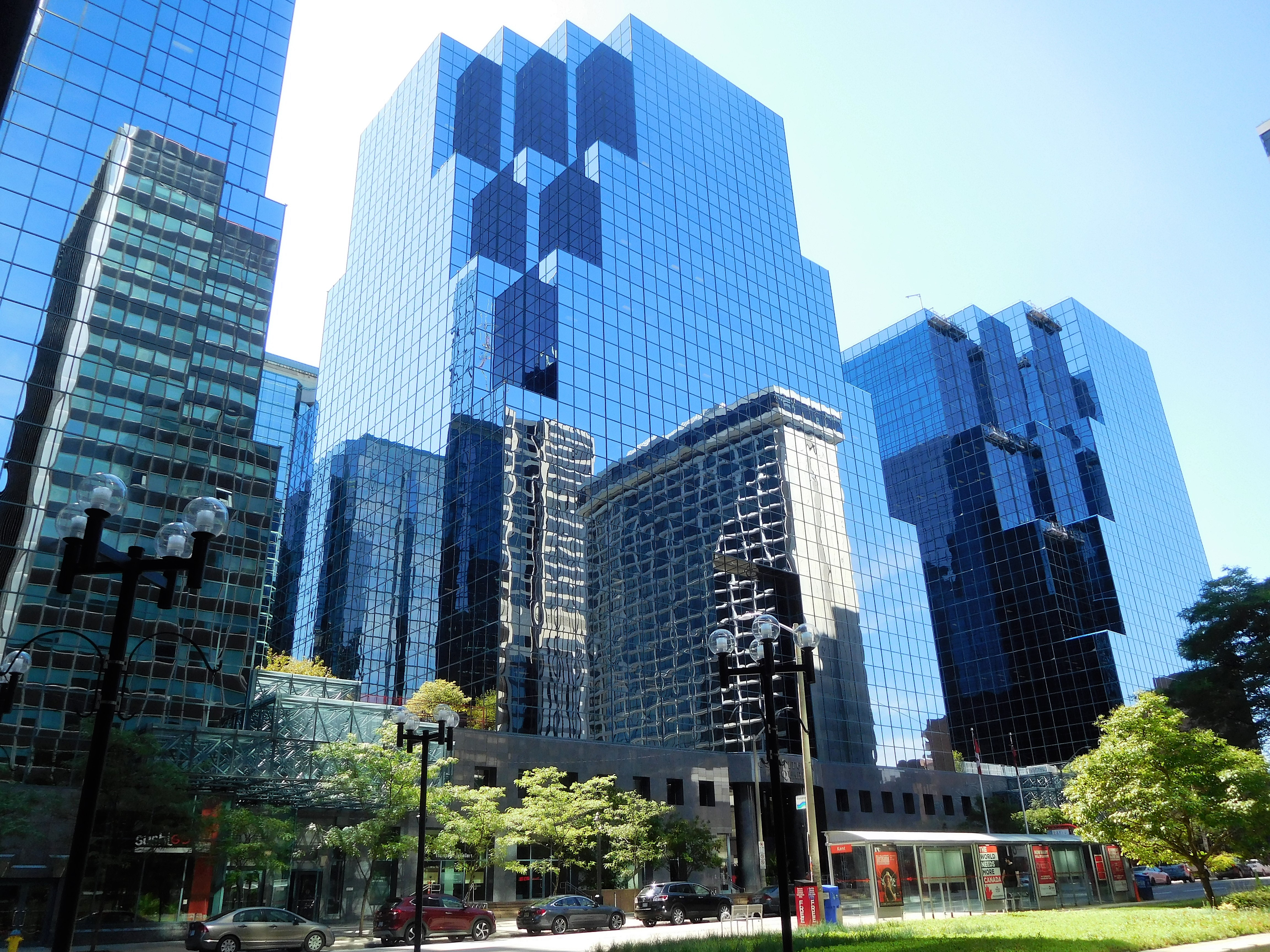
Constitution Square

Constitution Square is a three-tower office complex, located in downtown Ottawa, Ontario, at 340, 350 and 360 Albert Street. It is home to a variety of businesses, organizations and embassies. The three towers were developed by real estate developer and owner Oxford Properties Group. The towers were sold in 2017 for $480M to Greystone Managed Investments, Canderel and Canstone Realty Advisorys. The 1,058,046 square foot complex, located in the heart of the capital city's downtown core, is close to Ottawa's Parliament Hill and key federal buildings, and is a neighbour to the city's prominent financial and high tech industries. It is also home to the Liberal Party of Canada headquarters.

Oxford completed the first tower, consisting of 18 floors, in 1986, while tower two was completed in 1992 with 21 floors. In July 2005, it was announced that a third tower with 19 floors would be added to the complex, and tower three opened less than two years later, within the original budget.

The building has underground parking, a fitness center and 24-hour security.

== Embassies ==
The complex accommodates embassies for:

- Belgium (Suite 820)
- Burundi (Suite 410)
- Colombia (Suite 1002)
- Georgia (Suite 940)
- Iceland (Suite 710)
- Netherlands (Suite 2020)

== Building awards ==
- 2009 - BOMA Canada National Office Building of the Year Award (over One Million Square Feet)
- 2009 - BOMA Ottawa Local Office Building of the Year Award (over One Million Square Feet)
- 2007 - BOMA Best Certification
