= List of ambassadors and high commissioners to Canada =

This is a list of heads of diplomatic missions to Canada from other countries and entities, such as ambassadors and high commissioners, as listed by Global Affairs Canada.

== Current ambassadors and high commissioners ==
Below are the ambassadors and high commissioners to Canada, by order of precedence, as of August 2025.

Sending country/entity	Name	Credentials (as of August 2025)	Title
San Marino	Damiano Beleffi	18 May 2011	Ambassador (Note: Co-accredited as Permanent Representative to the United Nations; resides in New York City.)
Monaco	Maguy Maccario-Doyle	16 December 2014	Ambassador (Note: Co-accredited as Ambassador to the United States; resides in Washington, D.C.)
Yemen	Jamal Abdullah Yahya Al-Sallal	21 November 2016	Ambassador
Turkmenistan	Meret Orazov	21 November 2016	Ambassador
Djibouti	Mohamed Siad Douale	2 March 2017	Ambassador
Antigua and Barbuda	Ronald Sanders, Sir	13 March 2017	High Commissioner
Saint Vincent and the Grenadines	Louanne Gaylene Gilchrist	28 August 2017	Ambassador
Palau	Hersey Kyota	20 November 2017	Ambassador
Lebanon	Fadi Ziadeh	29 January 2018	Ambassador
Bahrain	Shaikh Abdulla Rashed Abdulla AlKhalifa	29 January 2018	Ambassador
Morocco	Souriya Otmani	29 June 2018	Ambassador
Armenia	Anahit Harutyunyan	9 July 2019	Ambassador
Afghanistan	Mohammad Hassan Soroosh Yousufzai	1 November 2019	Ambassador
Rwanda	Prosper Higiro	1 November 2019	Ambassador
Croatia	Vice Skračić	18 December 2019	Ambassador
Kosovo	Adriatik Kryeziu	10 March 2020	Ambassador
Thailand	Kallayana Vipattipumiprates	13 October 2020	Ambassador
Serbia	Dejan Ralević	30 November 2020	Ambassador
El Salvador	Ricardo Alfonso Cisneros Rodriguez	30 November 2020	Ambassador
Romania	Bogdan Maniou	22 March 2021	Ambassador
Guatemala	Guisela Atalida Godinez Sazo	22 March 2021	Ambassador
Argentina	Maria Josefina Martinez Gramuglia	29 March 2021	Ambassador
Belize	Lynn Raymond Young	4 August 2021	High Commissioner
Russia	Oleg Stepanov	9 September 2021	Ambassador
Ivory Coast	Bafetigue Ouattara	9 September 2021	Ambassador
Iceland	Hlynur Gudjonsson	9 September 2021	Ambassador
Holy See	Ivan Jurkovic	2 December 2021	Ambassador (Note: Titled Apostolic Nuncio rather than Ambassador.)
Slovenia	Andrej Gregor Rode	2 December 2021	Ambassador
Spain	Alfredo Martinez Serrano	7 December 2021	Ambassador
Solomon Islands	Jane Mugafalu Waetara	15 February 2022	High Commissioner
Qatar	Khalid Rashid S.H. Al-Mansouri	10 March 2022	Ambassador
Kiribati	Teburoro Tito	10 March 2022	Ambassador
Tonga	Viliami Vainga Tone	10 March 2022	Ambassador
Comoros	Issimail Chanfi	10 March 2022	Ambassador
Namibia	Margareth Natalie Mensah-Williams	10 March 2022	High Commissioner
Barbados	Gline Arley Clarke	27 April 2022	High Commissioner
South Africa	Rieaz Shaik	27 April 2022	High Commissioner
Latvia	Kaspars Ozolins	27 April 2022	Ambassador
Portugal	Antonio Manuel Torres Domingues Leao Rocha	7 June 2022	Ambassador
Poland	Witold Miroslaw Dzielski	7 June 2022	Ambassador
Japan	Kanji Yamanouchi	7 June 2022	Ambassador
Paraguay	Raul Antonio Montiel Gasto	22 September 2022	Ambassador
Estonia	Margus Rava	22 September 2022	Ambassador
Egypt	Ahmed Abdallah Ibrahim Hafez	22 September 2022	Ambassador
France	Michel Miraillet	22 September 2022	Ambassador
Bahamas	Vergeneas Alfred Gray	26 October 2022	High Commissioner
Moldova	Sergiu Odainic	23 November 2022	Ambassador
Switzerland	Olaf Andreas Kjelsen	23 November 2022	Ambassador
Guyana	Keith Linden George	23 November 2022	High Commissioner
Democratic Republic of Congo	Joksa Kabongo Ngoy	23 November 2022	Ambassador
North Macedonia	Argon Budjaku	23 November 2022	Ambassador
Laos	Sisavath Inphachanh	20 January 2023	Ambassador
Samoa	Paolelei Luteru	20 January 2023	High Commissioner
Zimbabwe	Cecil Toendepi Chinenere	28 March 2023	Ambassador
Colombia	Carlos Arturo Morales Lopez	28 March 2023	Ambassador
Mexico	Carlos Manuel Joaquin Gonzalez	28 March 2023	Ambassador
Bulgaria	Plamen Georgiev Georgiev	26 June 2023	Ambassador
Zambia	Kennedy Mpolobe Shepande	26 June 2023	Ambassador
Jamaica	Marsha Monique Coore Lobban	10 September 2023	High Commissioner
Chad	Bouroumdou Naloum	25 September 2023	Ambassador
Uruguay	Gustavo Anibal Alvarez Goyoaga	25 September 2023	Ambassador
Peru	Manuel Gerardo Talavera Espinar	25 September 2023	Ambassador
Slovak Republic	Viera Grigova	25 September 2023	Ambassador
Vietnam	Vinh Quang Pham	13 October 2023	Ambassador
Kazakhstan	Dauletbek Kussainov	13 October 2023	Ambassador
Mongolia	Sarantogos Erdenetsogt	13 October 2023	Ambassador
Israel	Iddo Moed	13 October 2023	Ambassador
Singapore	Chin Siong Tan	13 October 2023	High Commissioner
Sweden	Signe Fenja Burgstaller	17 November 2023	Ambassador
Saudi Arabia	Amal Yahya Almoalimi	17 November 2023	Ambassador
Czechia	Martin Tlapa	17 November 2023	Ambassador
Brazil	Carlos Alberto Franco Franca	17 November 2023	Ambassador
Senegal	Gorgui Ciss	17 November 2023	Ambassador
Gambia	Momodou Lamin Bah	4 December 2023	High Commissioner
Eswatini	Kennedy Fitzgerald Groening	4 December 2023	High Commissioner
Suriname	Jan Marten Willem Schalkwijk	4 December 2023	Ambassador
Saint Kitts and Nevis	Samuel Alharjai Berridge	17 February 2024	High Commissioner
Bosnia and Herzegovina	Aleksandar Bogdanic	20 February 2024	Ambassador
Jordan	Sabah Nizar Rashid Al Rafie	20 February 2024	Ambassador
Greece	Ekaterini Dimakis	20 February 2024	Ambassador
Algeria	Noureddine Sidi Abed	20 February 2024	Ambassador
Tunisia	Lassaad Boutara	20 February 2024	Ambassador
Iraq	Abdulrahman Hamid Mohamed Al-Hussaini	20 February 2024	Ambassador
Chile	Juan Carlos Garcia Perez de Arce	30 April 2024	Ambassador
Tanzania	Joseph Edward Sokoine	30 April 2024	High Commissioner
Malta	Mark Anthony Pace	30 April 2024	High Commissioner
Cuba	Rodrigo Malmierca Diaz	30 April 2024	Ambassador
Nepal	Bharat Raj Paudyal	30 April 2024	Ambassador
Republic of Congo	Appolinaire Aya	26 June 2024	Ambassador
China	Di Wang	26 June 2024	Ambassador
Uzbekistan	Furkat Sidikov	26 June 2024	Ambassador
Cameroon	XXX Ngola Philip Ngwese	13 September 2024	High Commissioner
Turkiye	Can Dizdar	13 September 2024	Ambassador
Germany	Matthias Luettenberg	13 September 2024	Ambassador
Bangladesh	Nadiha Sobhan	13 September 2024	High Commissioner
Ecuador	Esteban Jabier Crespo Polo	9 October 2024	Ambassador
Netherlands	Grietje Landman	9 October 2024	Ambassador
Ireland	John Concannon	9 October 2024	Ambassador
European Union	Geneviève Tuts	9 October 2024	Ambassador
Cyprus	Stavros Hatziyiannis	9 October 2024	High Commissioner
Austria	Andreas Rendl	9 October 2024	Ambassador
Albania	Artemis Malo	9 October 2024	Ambassador
United Arab Emirates	Abdulrahman Ali Almur Ali Alneyadi	4 December 2024	Ambassador
Ethiopia	Tewodros Girma Abebe	4 December 2024	Ambassador
Kenya	Carolyne Kamende Daudi	4 December 2024	High Commissioner
Luxembourg	Jean-Claude Kugener	4 December 2024	Ambassador
Gabon	Alexis Bengone	4 December 2024	High Commissioner
Australia	Kate Logan	9 December 2024	High Commissioner
Malawi	Esme Jynet Chombo	10 December 2024	High Commissioner
Mozambique	Alfredo Fabiao Nuvunga	10 December 2024	High Commissioner
Angola	Agostinho de Carvalho dos Santos Van-Dunem	10 December 2024	Ambassador
Malaysia	Shazelina Binti Zainul Abidin	10 December 2024	High Commissioner
Denmark	Nikolaj Harris	10 December 2024	Ambassador
Italy	Alessandro Cattaneo	10 December 2024	Ambassador
Pakistan	Muhammad Saleem	15 January 2025	High Commissioner
Lithuania	Egidijus Meilunas	15 January 2025	Ambassador
Lesotho	Malehlanye Constantinus Ralejoe	15 January 2025	High Commissioner
Finland	Hanna-Leena Korteniemi	15 January 2025	Ambassador
United Kingdom	Robert John Tinline	20 February 2025	High Commissioner
Bhutan	Pema Lektup Dorji	3 March 2025	Ambassador
Equatorial Guinea	Crisantos Obama Ondo	3 March 2025	Ambassador
Fiji	Ratu Ilisoni Caucau Cabealawa Vuidreketi	3 March 2025	Ambassador
Dominican Republic	Jose Alfonso Blanco Conde	3 March 2025	Ambassador
Grenada	Sylvester Quarless	15 April 2025	High Commissioner
Andorra	Joan Forner Rovira	29 April 2025	Ambassador
Cambodia	Chhea Keo	29 April 2025	Ambassador
Maldives	Abdul Ghafoor Mohamed	29 April 2025	High Commissioner
Botswana	Mpho Churchill O Mophuting	29 April 2025	High Commissioner
United States of America	Peter Hoekstra	29 April 2025	Ambassador

== Other offices ==
=== Chargé d'affaires and other diplomatic heads ===
Chargé d'affaires a.i. and other diplomatic heads in Canada, as of August 2025
Sending country/entity	Name	Diplomatic title	Higher official title
Azerbaijan	Vasif Cingiz Oglu Abutalibov	Chargé d'affaires, a.i.	Ambassador
Belgium	Filip Paul G. Vandenbroeke	Deputy Head of Mission & Chargé d'affaires, a.i.	Ambassador
Brunei Darussalam	Suzianti Abdul Latip	Second Secretary and Acting High Commissioner	High Commissioner
Burkina Faso	Idrissa Nenin Soulama	Minister-Counsellor & Chargé d'affaires, a.i.	Ambassador
Burundi	Évariste Ngendankengera	First Counsellor & Chargé d'affaires, a.i.	Ambassador
Costa Rica	Victor Manuel Porras Fernandez	Minister-Counsellor & Chargé d'affaires, a.i.	Ambassador
Georgia	Bakari Makaridze	Minister-Counsellor	Ambassador
Ghana	Simon Atieku	Minister & Chargé d'affaires, a.i.	High Commissioner
Guinea	Alhassane Diabate	First Secretary & Chargé d'affaires, a.i.	Ambassador
Haiti	Marie-Françoise Suzan	Minister-Counsellor & Chargé d'affaires, a.i.	Ambassador
Honduras	Aldo Federico Rosales Espinoza	Minister-Counsellor & Chargé d'affaires, a.i.	Ambassador
Hungary	Katalin Kapocsne Haas	Deputy Head of Mission & Chargé d'affaires, a.i.	Ambassador
India	Chinmoy Naik	Deputy High Commissioner & Acting High Commissioner	High Commissioner
Indonesia	Heru Santoso	Minister-Counsellor & Chargé d'affaires, a.i.	Ambassador
Kuwait	Ali H A A M Alastad	First Secretary & Chargé d'affaires, a.i.	Ambassador
Libya	Rashed A M Sharkasi	CounsellorCounsellor & Chargé d'affaires, a.i.	Ambassador
Madagascar	Sahondra Harilala Rakotoniaina	Counsellor & Chargé d'affaires, a.i.	Ambassador
Mali	Amadou Diallo	Minister-Counsellor & Chargé d'affaires, a.i.	Ambassador
Mauritania	Aly Ba	Second Counsellor & Chargé d'affaires, a.i.	Ambassador
Myanmar	May Thazin Tun	Counsellor & Chargé d'affaires, a.i.	Ambassador
New Zealand	Joshua Wayne Hauraki	Deputy Head of Mission & Acting High Commissioner	High Commissioner
Nigeria	Abba Kawu Zanna	Minister and Acting High Commissioner	High Commissioner
Norway	Trygve Bendiksby	Minister-Counsellor and Chargé d'affaires, a.i.	Ambassador
Panama	Thais Augusta Collado Castillo	First Secretary and Chargé d'affaires, a.i.	Ambassador
Philippines	Rea Oreta	Minister, Consul General and Chargé d'affaires, a.i.	Ambassador
Sierra Leone	Sheku Mesali	Deputy Head of Mission & Acting High Commissioner	High Commissioner
South Korea	Younggi Ahn	Minister and Chargé d'affaires, a.i.	Ambassador
Sri Lanka	Kiritharan Kumarasamy	First Secretary and Chargé d'affaires, a.i.	High Commissioner
Sudan	Bakhit Ismail Dahya	Chargé d'affaires, e.p. (Ambassador)	Ambassador
Togolese Republic	Cofie Sena Rodrigue Woussido	First Counsellor & Acting High Commissioner	High Commissioner
Trinidad and Tobago	Joanne Melissa Alfred	Counsellor & Acting High Commissioner	High Commissioner
Uganda	Allan Kajik	Deputy Head of Mission & Acting High Commissioner	High Commissioner

=== Vacant offices ===
Vacant positions, as of August 2025
Sending country	Last officeholder	Credentials	Title
Benin	vacant		Ambassador
Bolivia	vacant		Ambassador
Cabo Verde	vacant		Ambassador
Cambodia	vacant		Ambassador
Central African Republic	vacant		Ambassador
Eritrea	vacant		Ambassador
Grenada	vacant		Ambassador
Iran	vacant		Ambassador
Korea, Democratic People's Republic	vacant		Ambassador
Kyrgyz Republic	vacant		Ambassador
Liberia	vacant		Ambassador
Maldives	vacant		Ambassador
Marshall Islands	vacant		Ambassador
Mauritius	vacant		Ambassador
Montenegro	vacant		Ambassador
Nauru	vacant		Ambassador
Nicaragua	vacant		Ambassador
Niger	vacant		Ambassador
Oman	vacant		Ambassador
Papua New Guinea	vacant		High Commissioner
Saint Lucia	vacant		Ambassador
São Tomé and Príncipe	vacant		Ambassador
Seychelles	vacant		Ambassador
South Sudan	vacant		Ambassador
Syria	vacant		Ambassador
Timor-Leste	vacant		Ambassador
Tuvalu	vacant		Ambassador
Ukraine	vacant		Ambassador
Venezuela	vacant		Ambassador

== See also ==
- Ambassadors from Canada
