= Embassy of the Netherlands, Ottawa =

Diplomatic mission of the Netherlands to Canada

Embassy of the Kingdom of the Netherlands in Ottawa
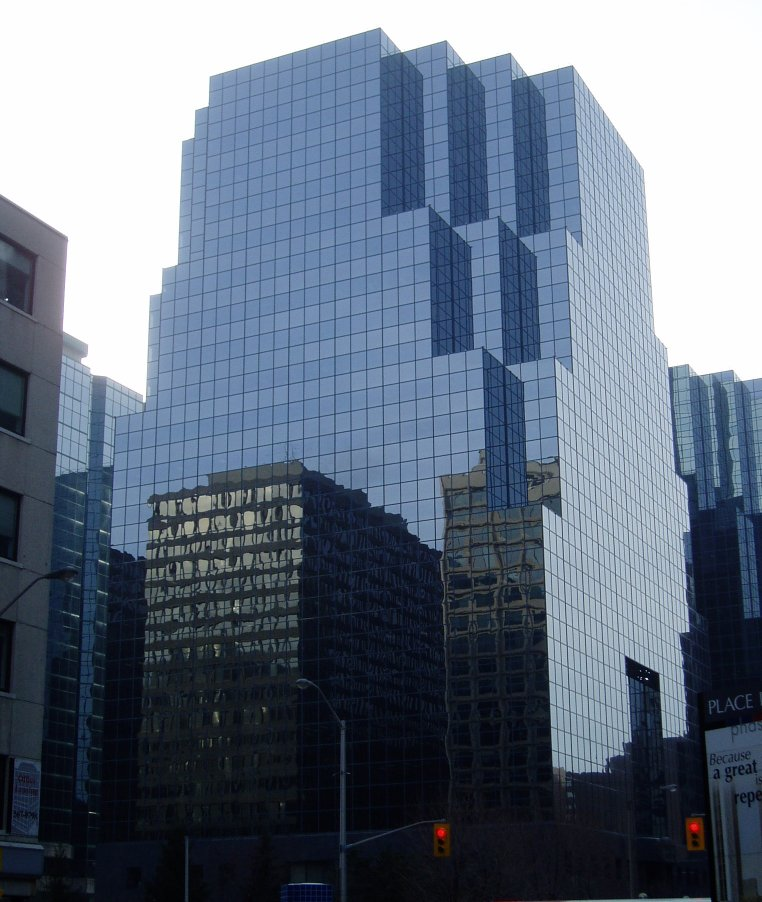
- Constitution Square Tower II which houses the Embassy of the Kingdom of the Netherlands
- Location: Ottawa
- Address: 350 Albert Street
- Coordinates: 45.4185°N 75.7031°W
- Ambassador: Ines Coppoolse

The Embassy of the Kingdom of the Netherlands in Ottawa is the Netherlands's primary diplomatic mission in Canada. It is located in Constitution Square Tower II, 350 Albert Street, suite 2020 in Ottawa.

The embassy consists of a political, economic and a consular section as well as a public diplomacy & cultural department. There is also a military attaché, who falls under the Ministry of Defense and can therefore operate more independently. Most staff is locally engaged.

The embassy connects with Canadians via several events and activities. Embassy staff organizes events to strengthen economic ties with Canada and to increase trade. The political department initiates and cooperates in activities that underline that Canada and the Netherlands think alike on topics such as democratic values, gay rights, development aid, end-of-life decisions and sustainability.

The embassy participates every year in a number of cultural events such as the Canadian Tulip Festival in Ottawa, Dutch heritage month in Ontario, the EU Film Festival in Ottawa, Toronto and Vancouver, Remembrance Day ceremonies across Canada and the Winter Celebration on the grounds of Rideau Hall.

The embassy participates in Study & Go Abroad fairs in Canada and works on increasing academic partnerships between Canadian and Dutch universities and higher education schools. The consular section of the embassy is open three days per week, but can only be visited by appointment via an online booking system.

The current ambassador of the Netherlands to Canada is Ines Coppoolse.

The Netherlands operates Consulate General offices in Toronto and Vancouver. There are Canadian Honorary Consuls appointed in Calgary, AB, Edmonton, AB, Saskatoon, SK, Winnipeg, MB, Montreal, QC, Quebec City, QC, Fredericton, NB and in Halifax, NS.

The Dutch Diplomatic Missions in Canada maintain a joint Facebook page to make an impact and to inform Canadians about the Netherlands: who they are and what they do, announcing activities as well as sharing behind the scenes images and stories. Since 2012, the embassy can be followed on Twitter @NLinCanada; there is also a Youtube.com/netherlandsincanada account with clips about the friendship between both countries.
