= Embassy of Hungary, Ottawa =

Diplomatic mission of Hungary to Canada

Embassy of Hungary in Ottawa
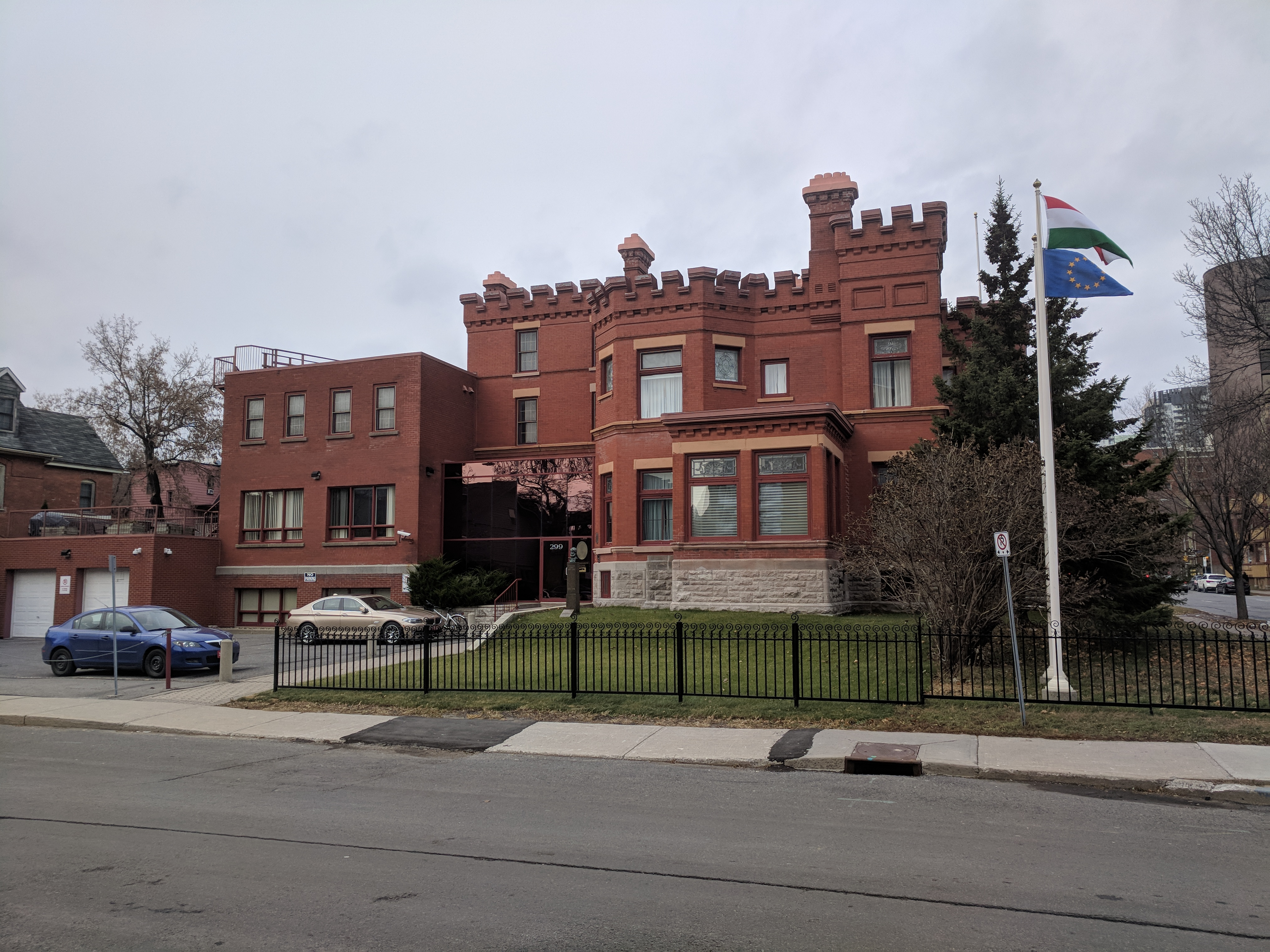
- Location: Ottawa, Ontario, Canada
- Address: 299 Waverley Street
- Coordinates: 45.414905°N 75.690892°W

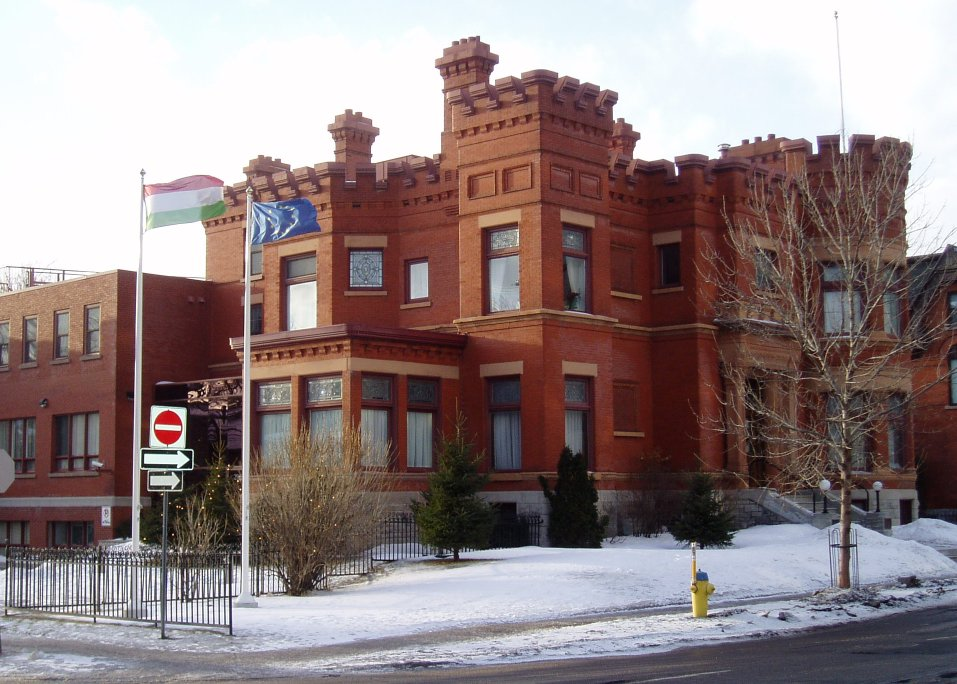
The embassy in 2005

The Embassy of Hungary in Ottawa is the embassy of Hungary to Canada. It is located in the historic Birkett Castle at 306 Metcalfe Street in the Centretown neighbourhood of Ottawa, Ontario, with the main entrance via the adjacent embassy annex at 299 Waverley Street.

Hungary maintained a Consulate General in Toronto which closed on November 27, 2009, but it has since been re-opened at a new location in Toronto as of April 18, 2014. Hungary also maintains Honorary Consulates in Montreal, Winnipeg, Edmonton, Calgary, and Vancouver. "Extramural consular days" are held at various times in other locations across the country.

== History ==
Birkett Castle was built in 1896 by Thomas Birkett, who served as Mayor of Ottawa and later as a Member of Parliament. The building, which was built in the Baronial style, features towers, a crenellated roofline, wood panelling, stained glass windows and a variety of fine ornaments.

It served as the Dominion Headquarters of the Boy Scouts Association in 1939. This urban "castle" was designated as a heritage property in 1980.

The building was acquired by the Government of Hungary in 1994, and it is now an attractive embassy that also serves as the official residence of the Hungarian ambassador. Inside the building, Hungarian sculptures, statues, and Herend china are exhibited.

== See also ==
- Canada–Hungary relations
- List of designated heritage properties in Ottawa
