= Embassy of Croatia, Ottawa =

Diplomatic mission of Croatia to Canada

Embassy of Croatia in Canada
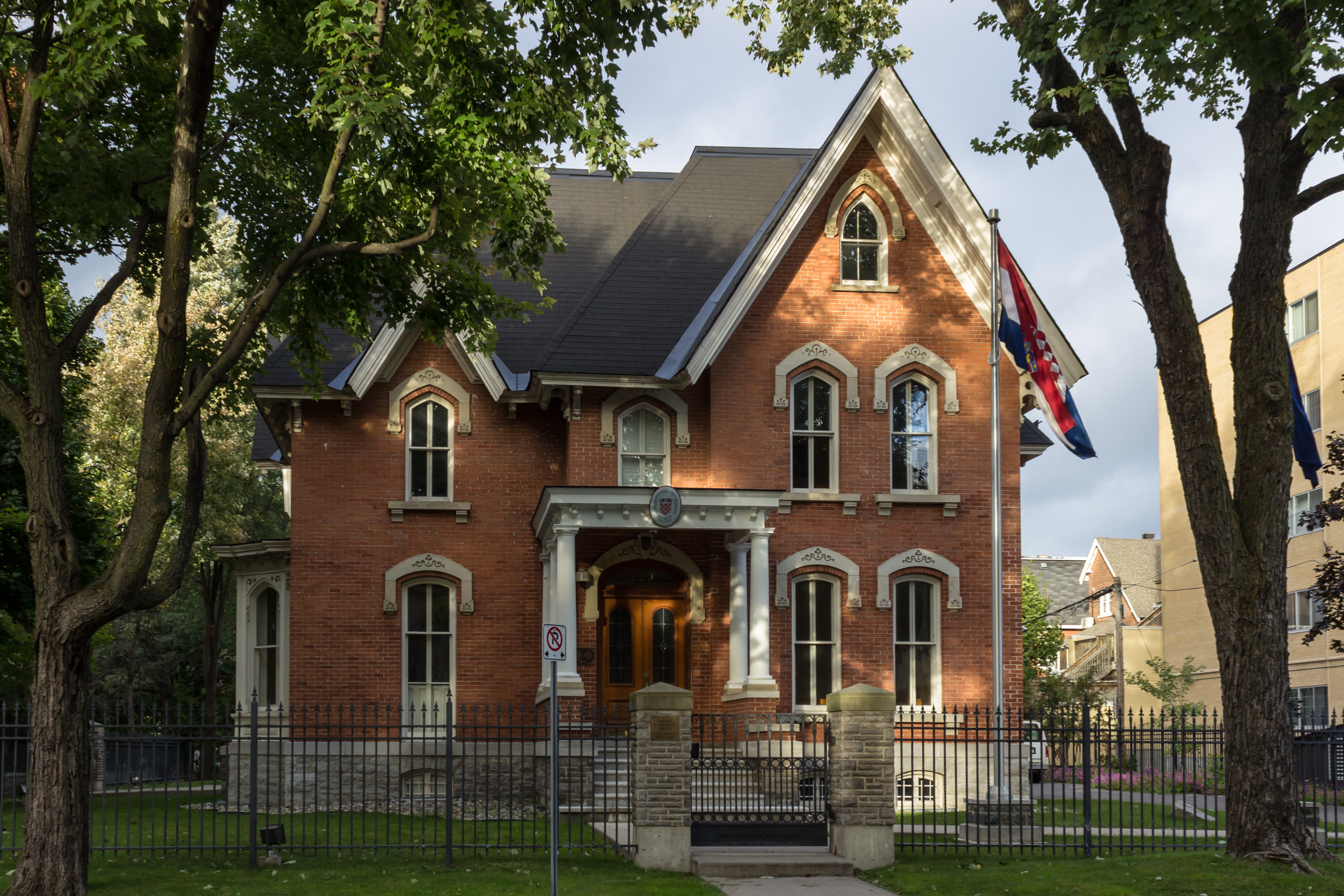
- Address: 229 Chapel Street; Ottawa, Ontario; K1N 7Y6
- Coordinates: 45.429507°N 75.679343°W
- Ambassador: Marica Matkovic

The Embassy of the Republic of Croatia is the diplomatic mission of Croatia in Canada. It is located in Toller House at the corner of Chapel and Daly Streets in the Sandy Hill neighbourhood of Ottawa, Ontario, Canada.

The building was originally constructed in 1875 in Domestic Gothic Revival style by Henry Horsey and J. Sheard, architects. The first occupant was J.H. Plummer, the new Ottawa manager of the Bank of Commerce. Two years later, Télesphore Fournier, a Justice of the Supreme Court of Canada, moved in with his family. It was bought by Auditor General of the Dominion’s Currency Frederick Toller in 1882. His family owned it until 1912 when it was bought by cabinet minister Louis-Philippe Brodeur who owned it until 1931. The house was owned by a group of nuns who used it as a residence and school until 1968. It was then rented out to students from the nearby University of Ottawa.

The heritage building was purchased for the Republic of Croatia by the Croatian-Canadian community after Croatia gained its independence in 1993. Local fundraising also paid for the significant restoration work that completely refurbished the estate. It opened as the Croatian embassy in 1999. The building was included amongst other architecturally interesting and historically significant buildings in Doors Open Ottawa, held June 2 and 3, 2012.

Croatia also maintains a consular office in Mississauga.

== See also ==
- Croatian diplomatic missions
- List of designated heritage properties in Ottawa
