= Embassy of Norway, Ottawa =

Diplomatic mission of Norway in Canada

- Location: Ottawa
- Address: 150 Metcalfe Street, Suite 1300
- Coordinates: 45°25′11.74″N 75°41′42.64″W
- Ambassador: Jon Elvedal Fredriksen
- Website: norway.no/en/canada

The Embassy of Norway in Ottawa was established in 1949. The main task of the embassy is to promote Norwegian interests in Canada and further develop Norwegian-Canadian relations. In addition to the embassy there are eleven Norwegian Honorary Consuls in different locations in Canada.

== Visa applications ==
Due to a representation agreement all visa applications for Norway in Canada are handled by the Embassy of Denmark in Ottawa.

== History ==
Norway's diplomatic representation in Canada was raised in 1942 to a legation, stationed in Montreal. The first minister in Canada was Daniel Steen, who already had been General Consul in Montreal since 1934. In 1949, the embassy was moved to the Canadian capital of Ottawa and upgraded to an embassy, led by an ambassador.
