= Embassy of Indonesia, Ottawa =

Diplomatic mission of Indonesia to Canada

Embassy of Indonesia, Ottawa Kedutaan Besar Republik Indonesia di Ottawa Ambassade d'Indonésie à Ottawa

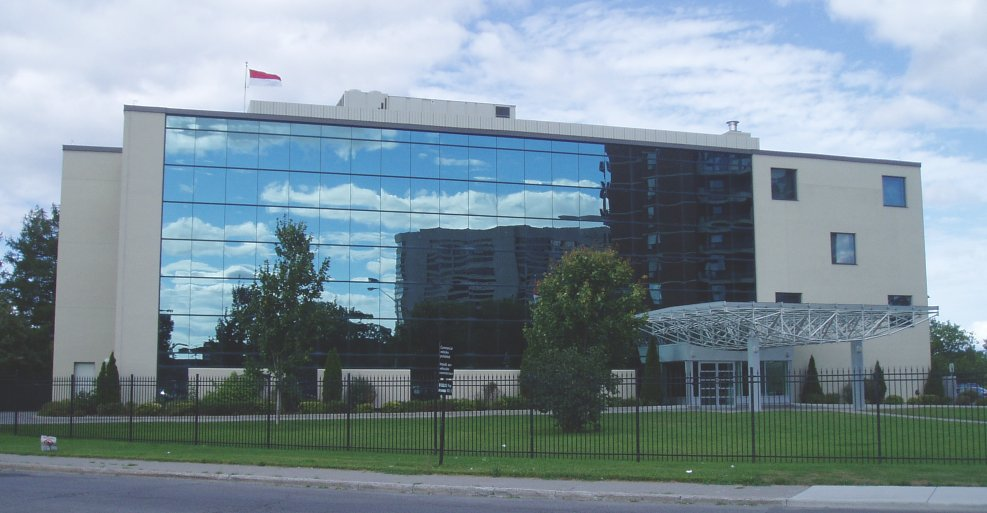
- Location: Ottawa, Canada
- Address: 55 Parkdale Avenue; Ottawa ON K1Y 1E5; Canada
- Coordinates: 45.410285°N 75.734178°W
- Ambassador: Daniel Tumpal Sumurung Simanjuntak
- Website: kemlu.go.id/ottawa/en

Embassy of Indonesia, Ottawa (French: Ambassade d'Indonésie à Ottawa; Indonesian: Kedutaan Besar Republik Indonesia di Ottawa) is the diplomatic mission of the Republic of Indonesia to Canada. The embassy also represents Indonesia in the International Civil Aviation Organization (ICAO). In addition to the embassy, Indonesia has two consulates-general in Toronto (Ontario) and Vancouver (British Columbia).

The chancery is located on Parkdale Avenue, south of the Ottawa River in Mechanicsville. The Indonesian government bought and renovated the building in this location in 1997. Before this location, the chancery was located on 287 MacLaren Street, Ottawa. When the diplomatic mission was still in the form of a legation office in 1952, it was located on Aylmer Road, Aylmer, Quebec.

The first Indonesian ambassador to Canada was Ali Sastroamidjojo (1953–1954). The current ambassador is Daniel Tumpal Sumurung Simanjuntak.

== See also ==
- Canada–Indonesia relations
- List of diplomatic missions of Indonesia
