= Embassy of Kosovo, Ottawa =

Diplomatic mission of Kosova in Canada, located in Ottawa

Embassy of Canada in Ottawa
- Location: Ontario, Ottawa
- Address: 251 Cooper St, Ottawa, ON K2P 0G2, Canada

The Embassy of Kosovo in Ottawa is the official diplomatic mission of the Kosovo in Canada. The embassy is located at 470 Somerset Street West, Ottawa, Ontario, K1R 5J8. Kosovo also maintains a consulate in Toronto.
