= Embassy of Egypt, Ottawa =

Diplomatic mission of Egypt to Canada

Embassy of Egypt in Ottawa
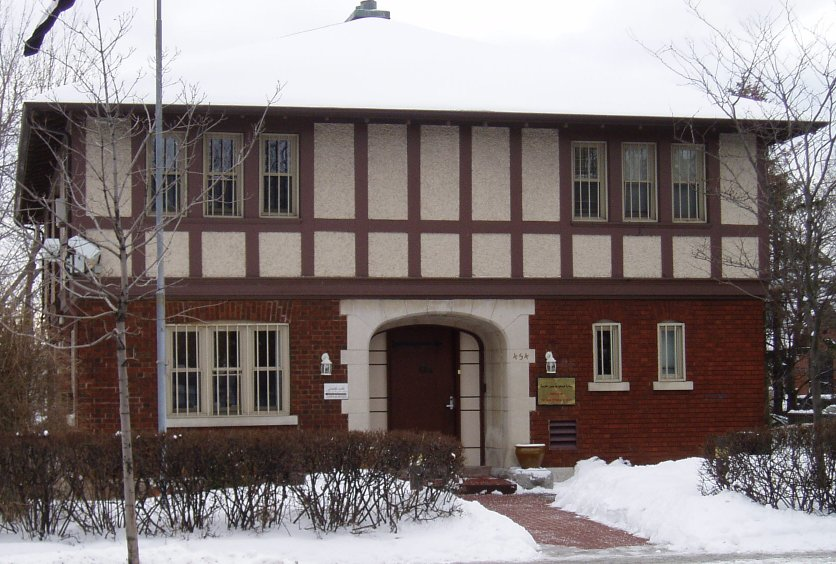
- Location: 454 Laurier Ave. East; Ottawa, Ontario, Canada; K1N 6R3
- Coordinates: 45.428543°N 75.674654°W
- Ambassador: Ahmed Hafez

An Egyptian Consul-General was appointed in Ottawa in 1950 and the Consulate-General was raised to the rank of Embassy in August 1954. Mr. H.M. El-Hakeem, who had been Consul-General, became Chargé d'Affaires. The first Egyptian Ambassador to Canada, Mr. El-Husseini El-Khatib, presented his credentials on May 3, 1955.

The Embassy of Egypt is Egypt's embassy in Canada. It is located at 454 Laurier Avenue East in Ottawa, Ontario. Egypt also operates a significant Consulate-General in Montreal with 14 accredited diplomatic personnel.

Ahmed Hafez serves as Ambassador with a staff of diplomats plus locally hired employees.

== List of representatives ==
The following is a list of Ambassadors Extraordinary and Plenipotentiary of Egypt to Canada.

Name	Period	Function	Note
H. M. El-Hakeem	1954–1955	Charge d'Affaires a.i.	Accredited in August 1954
El Husseini El Khatib	1955–1959	Ambassador	Accredited on 3 May 1955
Mahmoud Fawzy Kamel	1959	Charge d'Affaires a.i.	Accredited on 18 January 1959
Abdel Hamid Ibrahim Seoud	1959–1964	Ambassador	Accredited on 19 August 1959
Ahmed Hassan El-Feki	1964–1965	Ambassador	Accredited on 2 July 1964
Mahmoud Moharram Hammad	1965–1968	Ambassador	Accredited on 29 September 1965
Mohamed Choucri	1968–1971	Ambassador	Accredited on 8 October 1968
Waguih Ahmed Moustafa	1971–1972	Charge d'Affaires a.i.	Accredited on 5 December 1971
Ahmed Sabri Kamal	1972–1976	Ambassador	Accredited on 10 August 1972
Amr Ahmed Shawki	1976	Charge d'Affaires a.i.	Accredited in August 1976
Hassan Fahmy Abdel Megid	1976–1981	Ambassador	Accredited on 22 November 1976
Tahseen M. Basheer	1981–1985	Ambassador	Accredited on 19 November 1981
Mahmoud Kassem	1985–1989	Ambassador	Accredited on 15 August 1985
Mohamed Adel Hussein Elsafty	1989–1993	Ambassador	Accredited on 8 September 1989
Mahmoud H. Farghal	1993–1997	Ambassador	Accredited on 24 November 1993
Hamdy Nada	1997–2000	Ambassador	Accredited on 17 September 1997
Sallama Mahmoud Shaker	2000–2004	Ambassador	Accredited on 28 September 2000
Mahmoud F. El-Saeed	2004–2008	Ambassador	Accredited on 10 September 2004
Hala Samir El Bishawy	2008	Charge d'Affaires a.i.	Accredited in March 2008
Shamel Elsayed Nasser	2008–2010	Ambassador	Accredited on 15 September 2008
Wael Ahmed Kamal Aboul Magd	2010–2014	Ambassador	Accredited on 23 September 2010
Motaz Mounir Zahran	2014–2018	Ambassador	Accredited on 17 September 2014
Salwa Ebrahim Mohamed Elmowafi	2018	Charge d'Affaires a.i.	Accredited in October 2018
Ahmed Mahmoud A. Abu Zeid	2018–2022	Ambassador	Accredited on 13 November 2018
Rehab Abdelhak Ali Shawer	2022	Charge d'Affaires a.i.	Accredited in August 2022
Ahmed Abdallah Ibrahim Hafez	2022-present	Ambassador	Accredited on 22 September 2022
