= Embassy of Brazil, Ottawa =

Diplomatic mission of Brazil to Canada

Embassy of Brazil in Ottawa
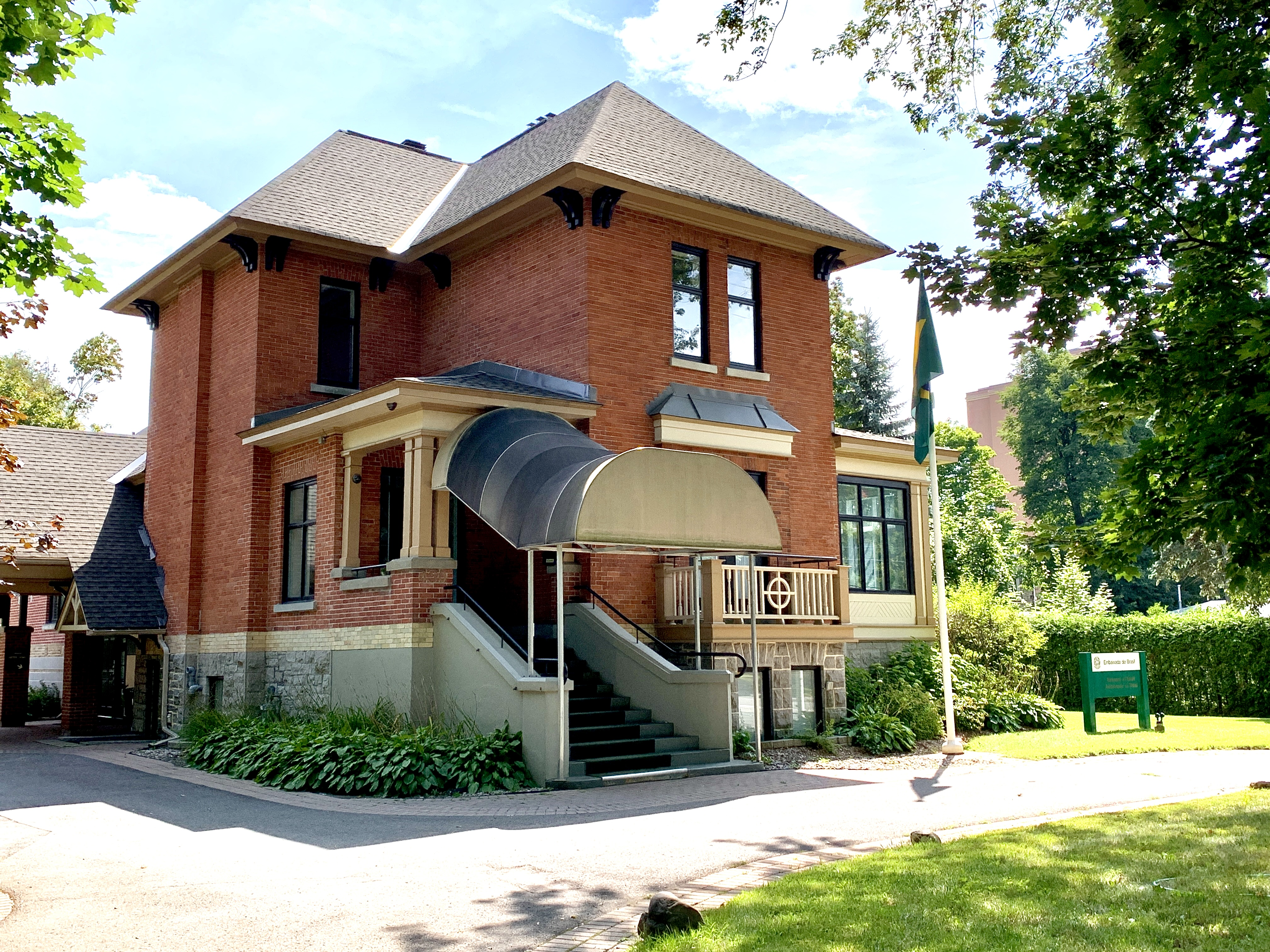
- Embassy of Brazil in Ottawa
- Address: 450 Wilbrod Street; Ottawa, Ontario; K1N 6M8
- Coordinates: 45.428863°N 75.67673°W
- Ambassador: Denis Fontes de Souza Pinto

The Embassy of Brazil is Brazil's embassy in Canada. It is located at 450 Wilbrod Street in Ottawa, Ontario, Canada. Carlos Alberto Franco França serves as Ambassador (as of November 2023).

Brazil also operates consulate offices in Montreal, Toronto, and Vancouver.
