= Centretown =

- Neighbourhood
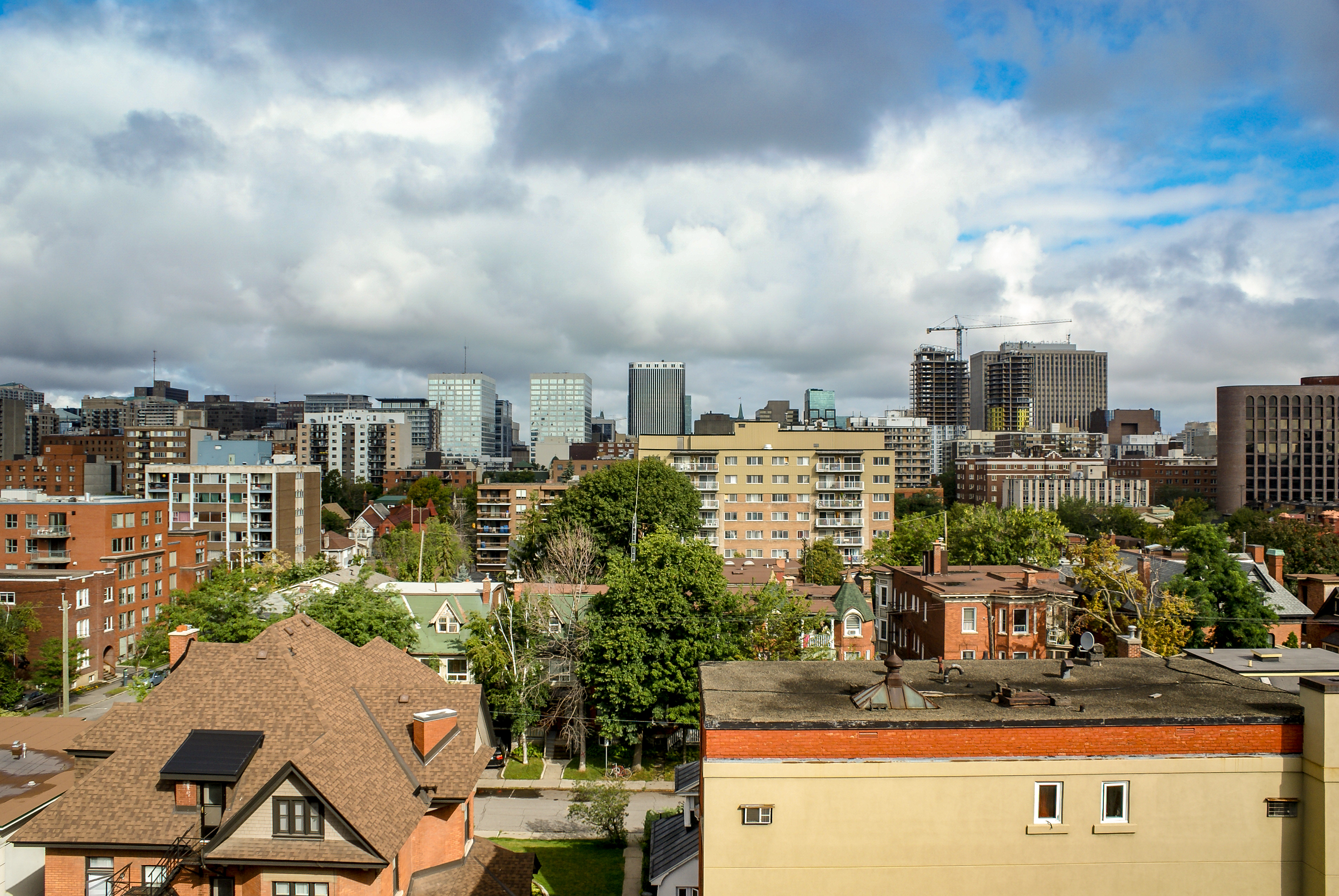
- Centretown seen towards Downtown

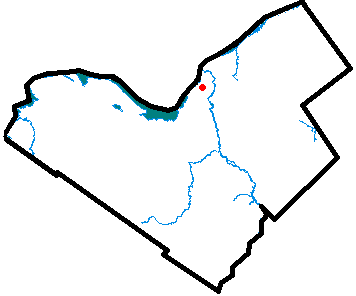
- Location of Centretown Ottawa in Ottawa
- Coordinates: 45°24′40″N 75°41′40″W
- Country: Canada
- Province: Ontario
- City: Ottawa

Government
  - Community Association: Centretown Citizens Community Association
  - President: Robert Dekker
  - MPs: Yasir Naqvi
  - MPPs: Catherine McKenney
  - Councillors: Ariel Troster

Area
  - Total: 2.1 km^{2} (0.81 sq mi)
- Elevation: 75 m (246 ft)

Population (2021)
  - Total: 25,687
  - Density: 12,231.9/km^{2} (31,680/sq mi)
- Canada 2021 Census
- Time zone: UTC-5 (Eastern (EST))

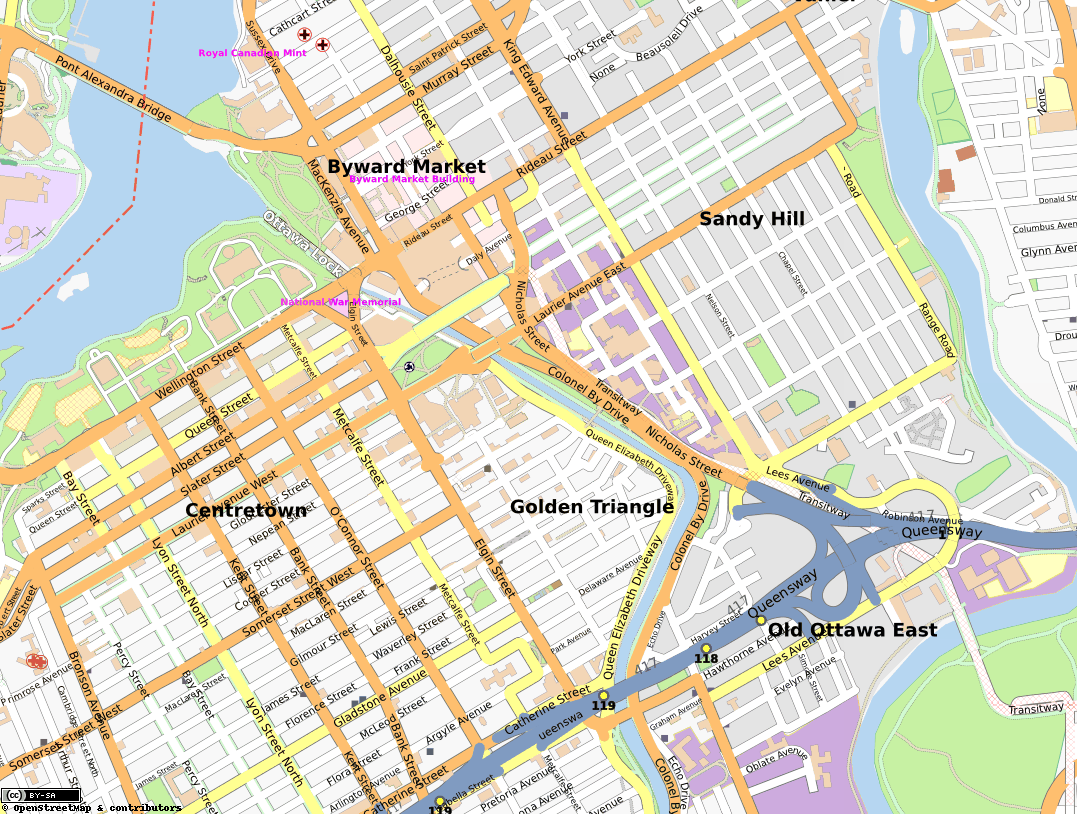
Map of the east-end of Downtown Ottawa

Centretown is a neighbourhood in Somerset Ward, in central Ottawa, Ontario, Canada. It is defined by the city as "the area bounded on the north by Gloucester Street and Lisgar Street, on the east by the Rideau Canal, on the south by the Queensway freeway and on the west by Bronson Avenue." Traditionally it was all of Ottawa west of the Rideau Canal, while Lower Town was everything to the east. For certain purposes, such as the census and real estate listings, the Golden Triangle and/or Downtown Ottawa (between Gloucester/Lisgar and the Ottawa River) is included in Centretown and it is considered part of Centretown by the Centretown Citizens Community Association as well as being used in this way in casual conversation.

The total population of Centretown (south of Gloucester Street) was 25,687 according to the Canada 2021 Census.

Centretown is marked by a mix of residential and commercial properties. The main streets such as Bank Street and Elgin Street are largely commercial, while the smaller ones, notably MacLaren and Gladstone are more residential. Much of the area still consists of original single family homes, but there are newer infill and town house developments and low-rise and high-rise apartment buildings. A construction boom that began in the late nineties significantly increased the number of condominiums and other residential and commercial high-rise buildings north of Cooper Street.

Landmarks include the Canadian Museum of Nature, Dundonald Park, Jack Purcell Park, McNabb Recreation Centre, the Ottawa Curling Club, and the Sens Mile.

== Demographics ==
According to the Canada 2021 Census. Defined as the area of Ottawa bounded on the west by Bronson, north by Gloucester Street, east by the Rideau Canal and on the south by the Queensway.

- Population: 25,687
- Change (2016–2021): +7.8%
- Total Private Dwellings: 18,291
- Land Area: 2.1 km^{2}.
- Population density: 12,231.9 per km^{2}.

Precise numbers are difficult because of the large contingent of transient residents in the neighbourhood, many of whom are students or hill staffers temporarily living in Ottawa.

== Mid-Centretown Design Study ==
In 2009, the City of Ottawa launched a Mid-Centretown Community Design Plan study, which was to cover the area roughly bounded by "Elgin Street on the east, the 417 on the south, Kent Street on the west and the Central Area boundary/Gloucester Street on the north". Since that time, the study has come to encompass the entirety of Centretown. The design plan is targeted for completion in the fall of 2012.

== Members of Parliament ==
The area was represented by two members from 1872 to 1935

1. Joseph Merrill Currier, Liberal-Conservative (1867–1882); Ottawa (City of)
2. John Bower Lewis, Conservative (1872–1874); Ottawa (City of)
3. Pierre St. Jean, Liberal (1874–1878); Ottawa (City of)
4. Joseph Tassé, Conservative (1878–1887); Ottawa (City of)
5. Charles H. Mackintosh, Conservative (1882–1887); Ottawa (City of)
6. W. G. Perley, Conservative (1887–1890); Ottawa (City of)
7. Honoré Robillard, Liberal-Conservative (1887–1896); Ottawa (City of)
8. Charles H. Mackintosh, Conservative (1890–1893); Ottawa (City of)
9. James Alexander Grant, Conservative (1893–1896); Ottawa (City of)
10. William H. Hutchison, Liberal (1896–1900); Ottawa (City of)
11. N. A. Belcourt, Liberal (1896–1907); Ottawa (City of)
12. Thomas Birkett, Conservative (1900–1904); Ottawa (City of)
13. Robert Stewart, Liberal (1904–1908); Ottawa (City of)
14. J. B. T. Caron, Liberal (1907–1908); Ottawa (City of)
15. Sir Wilfrid Laurier, Liberal (1908–1910); Ottawa (City of)
16. Harold B. McGiverin, Liberal (1908–1911); Ottawa (City of)
17. Albert Allard, Liberal (1910–1911); Ottawa (City of)
18. Alfred Ernest Fripp, Conservative (1911–1921); Ottawa (City of)
19. John Léo Chabot, Conservative (1911–1921); Ottawa (City of)
20. Harold B. McGiverin, Liberal (1921–1925); Ottawa (City of)
21. Edgar Rodolphe Chevrier, Liberal (1921–1925); Ottawa (City of)
22. Stewart McClenaghan, Conservative (1925–1926); Ottawa (City of)
23. John Léo Chabot, Conservative (1925–1926); Ottawa (City of)
24. Edgar Rodolphe Chevrier, Liberal (1926–1935); Ottawa (City of)
25. Gordon Cameron Edwards, Liberal (1926–1930); Ottawa (City of)
26. Thomas Franklin Ahearn, Liberal (1930–1940); Ottawa (City of) to 1935. Ottawa West from 1935
27. George McIlraith, Liberal (1940–1972); Ottawa West to 1968. Ottawa Centre from 1968
28. Hugh Poulin, Liberal (1973–1978); Ottawa Centre
29. Robert de Cotret, Progressive Conservative (1978–1979); Ottawa Centre
30. John Evans, Liberal (1979–1984); Ottawa Centre
31. Michael Cassidy, NDP (1984–1988); Ottawa Centre
32. Mac Harb, Liberal (1988–2003); Ottawa Centre
33. Ed Broadbent, NDP (2004–2005); Ottawa Centre
34. Paul Dewar, NDP (2006–2015); Ottawa Centre
35. Catherine McKenna, Liberal (2015–2021); Ottawa Centre
36. Yasir Naqvi, Liberal (2021–Present); Ottawa Centre

== Centretown churches ==
- Centretown United Church
- Church of St. Barnabas, Apostle and Martyr
- First Church of Christ, Scientist
- First United Church
- Holy Korean Martyrs Parish
- Salvation Army Gladstone Community Church
- St. George's Anglican Church
- St Patrick's Basilica
- St. Elijah's Housing (former church, today an apartment building)

== Centretown embassies ==
- Embassy of the Czech Republic in Ottawa
- Embassy of the Federal Republic of Germany in Ottawa
- Embassy of the Hellenic Republic in Ottawa
- Embassy of the Republic of Croatia in Ottawa
- Embassy of Iran in Ottawa
- Embassy of Iraq in Ottawa
- Embassy of the Republic of Madagascar in Ottawa
- High Commission of the Federal Republic of Nigeria in Ottawa
- Embassy of the Republic of Rwanda in Ottawa
- Embassy of the Republic of Zimbabwe in Ottawa
- Embassy of the Republic of Hungary in Ottawa
- Embassy of El Salvador in Ottawa
- Embassy of Ukraine in Ottawa

== See also ==
- List of Ottawa neighbourhoods
