= Electoral history of Wilfrid Laurier =

List of elections featuring Wilfrid Laurier as a candidate

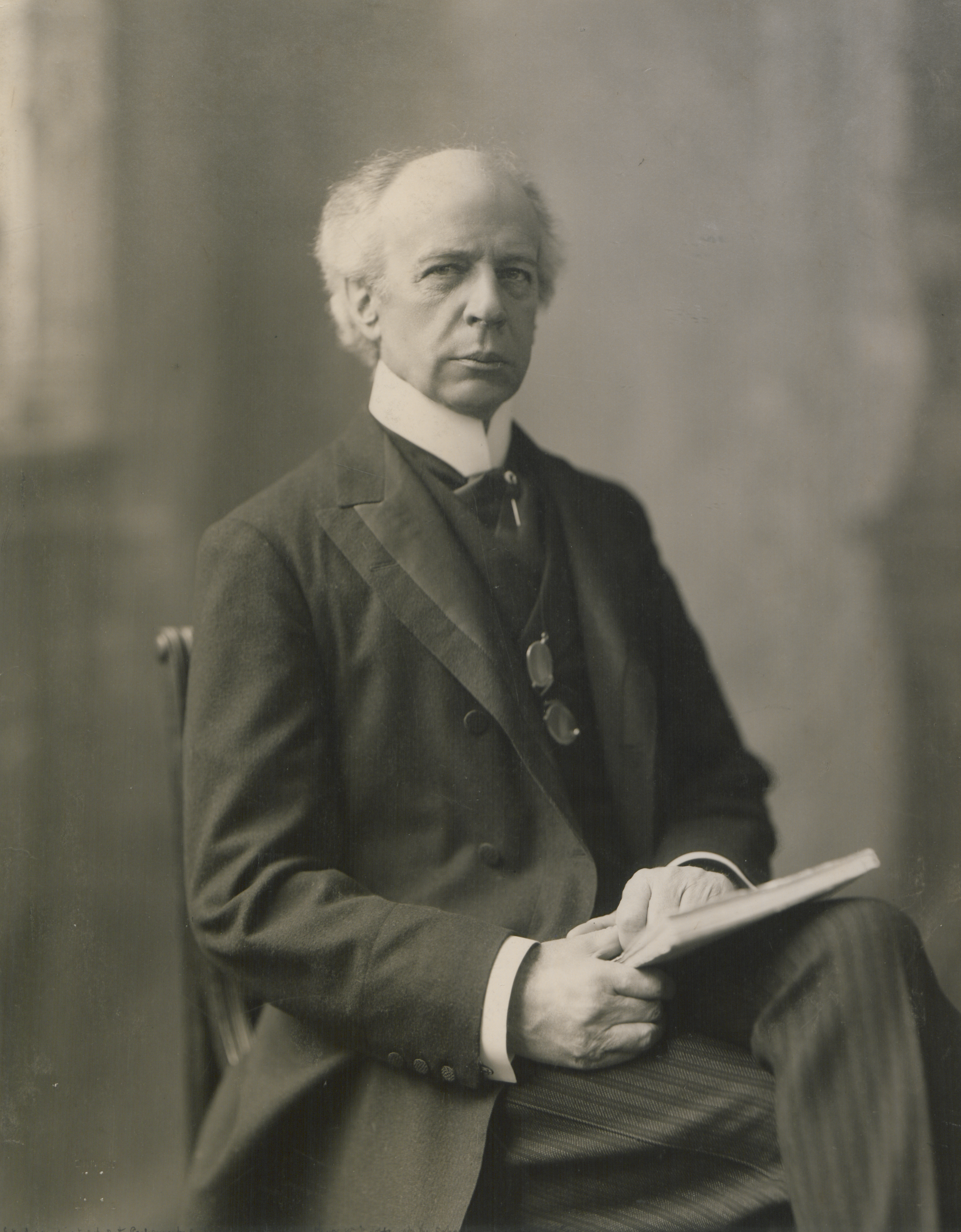
Laurier in 1906.

This article is the Electoral history of Sir Wilfrid Laurier, the seventh Prime Minister of Canada.

A Liberal, he was Canada's fourth longest-serving prime minister, with the longest consecutive time in office (over fifteen years, from 1896 to 1911). He won four general elections and lost three. He was succeeded by Sir Robert Borden. He died in 1919, having been the Leader of the Official Opposition for eight years.

== Summary ==
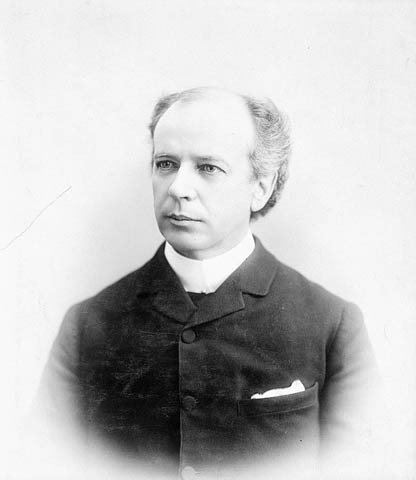
Laurier in 1891, the year he first led the Liberal Party in a general election.

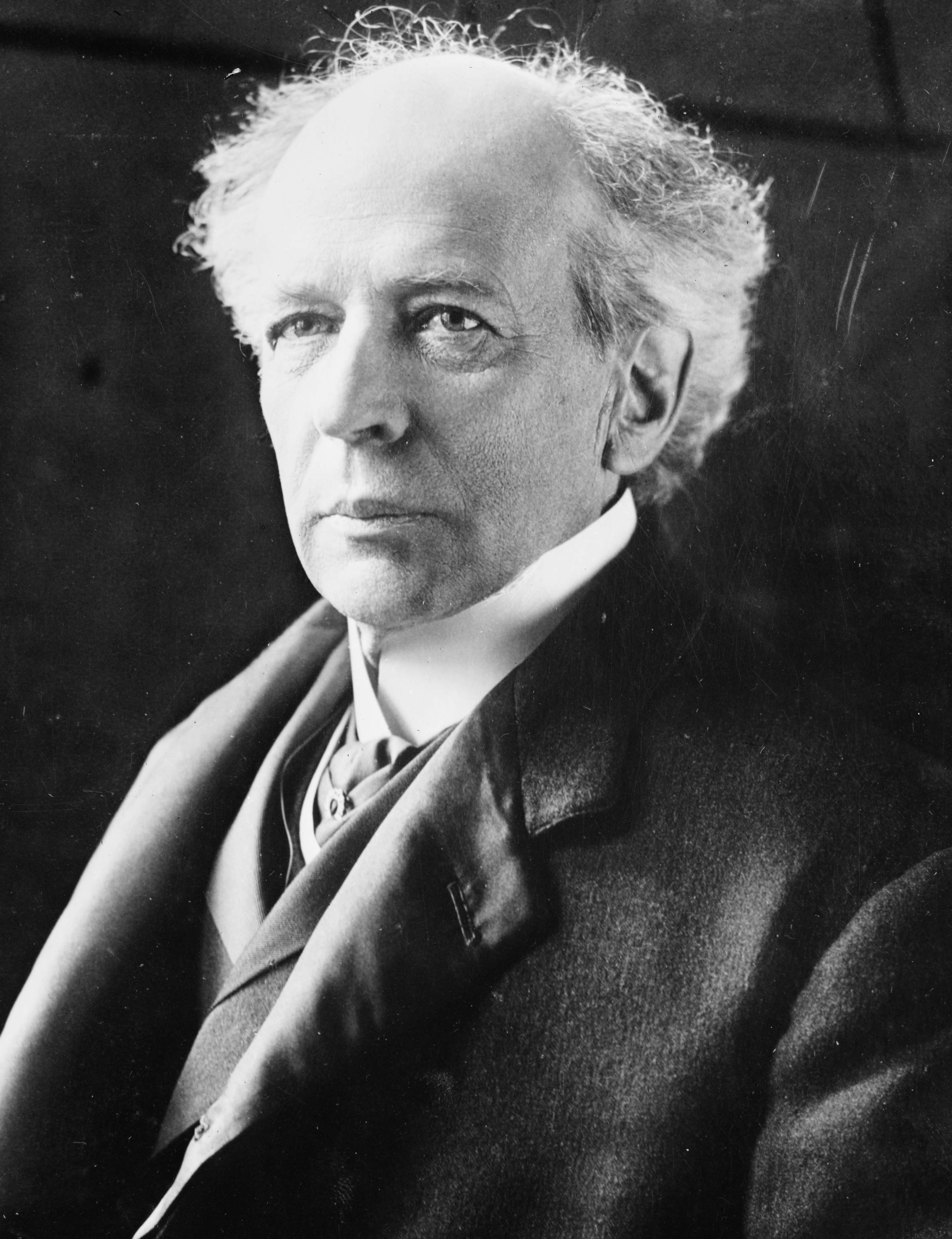
Laurier in later life.

Laurier was the fourth longest-serving prime minister, serving from 1896 to 1911. His term in office of 15 years and 86 days (July 11, 1896 to October 6, 1911) remains the longest unbroken term of a Canadian prime minister.

He led the Liberals in seven general elections, winning four (1896, 1900, 1904, and 1908) and losing three (1891, 1911, 1917). He is in a three-way tie with Sir John A. Macdonald and Mackenzie King for the number of general elections he contested as leader of a party.

His streak of four consecutive majority governments (1896, 1900, 1904, and 1908) is tied with Macdonald's identical record as the longest streak of general election victories at the federal level.

Laurier was the second of eight prime ministers from Quebec, the others being Sir John Abbott, Louis St. Laurent, Pierre Trudeau, Brian Mulroney, Jean Chrétien, Paul Martin and Justin Trudeau. He was also the first of five francophone prime ministers, the others being St. Laurent, Pierre Trudeau, Chrétien, and Justin Trudeau.

Laurier stood for election to the House of Commons of Canada 20 times, in 1874, 1877 (twice), 1878, 1878, 1882, 1887, 1891 (twice), 1896 (three times), 1900, 1904 (twice), 1908 (twice), 1911 (twice), and 1917 (twice), although some of those were multiple elections in the same general election, as was permitted at that time. He won seventeen of the elections and was defeated three times.

Laurier was elected as a member of the House of Commons for six different constituencies, and at various times sat in the Commons for three different constituencies (Drummond—Arthabaska, Quebec East, Quebec; and Soulanges, Quebec. He served in the Commons for a total of 44 years, 10 months, 17 days, continuously from the 3rd Parliament, elected in 1874, to his death in 1919.

Laurier served briefly in the Legislative Assembly of Quebec from 1871 to 1874, when he resigned to enter federal politics in the general election of 1874.

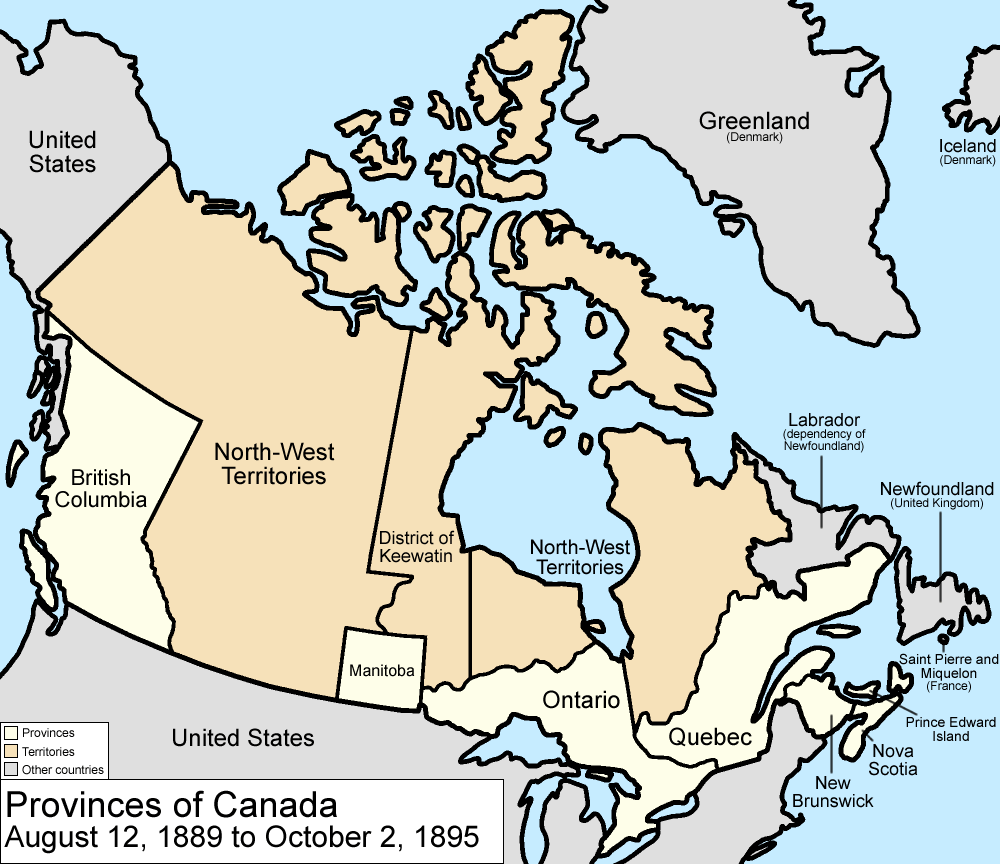
Canada had seven provinces, one territory, and one semi-autonomous district in 1896, when Laurier was first elected Prime Minister.

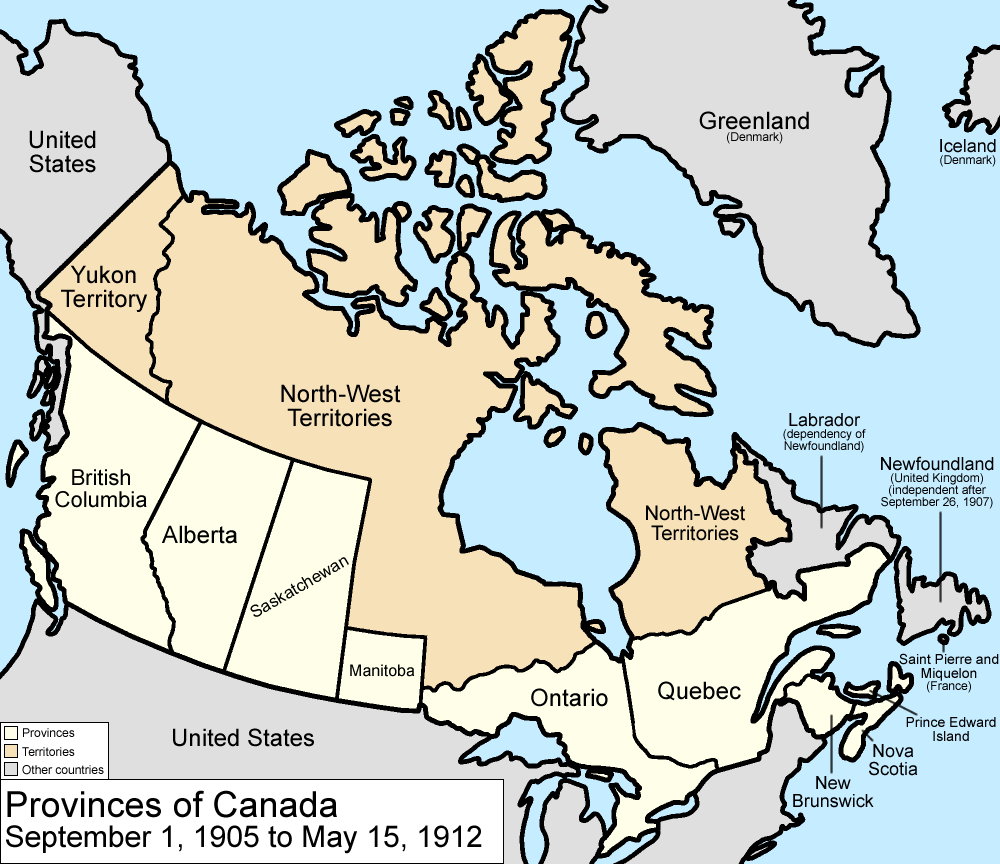
Canada had nine provinces and two territories in 1911, Laurier's last year as Prime Minister.

== Federal General Elections, 1891 to 1917 ==
Laurier led the Liberals in seven general elections, winning four (1896, 1900, 1904, and 1908) and losing three (1891, 1911, 1917).

=== Federal election, 1891 ===
The 1891 election was Laurier's first election as leader of the Liberals. His opponent in the 1891 election was Sir John A. Macdonald, in his last election. Macdonald, aged 76, again led the Conservatives to victory, albeit with a reduced majority. Laurier remained the Leader of the Official Opposition after the election.

Canadian Federal Election, 1891 – Parties, Leaders, Seats Won and Popular Vote
Party	Leaders	Seats Won	Popular Vote
Conservative	Sir John A. Macdonald^{1}	97	43.0%
Liberal-Conservative	Sir John A. Macdonald^{1}	20	5.6%
Liberal	Wilfrid Laurier^{2}	90	45.2%
Independent Conservative	–	3	1.9%
Independent	–	2	0.8%
Independent Liberal	–	1	0.7%
Nationalist Conservative	–	1	0.2%
Nationalist	–	1	0.0%^{3}
Equal Rights	–	0	0.3%
Progressive	–	0	0.1%
Unknown^{4}	–	0	2.2%
Total		215	100.0%
Source: Library of Parliament – History of Federal Ridings since 1867

^{1} Prime Minister when election was called; Prime Minister after the election.
^{2} Leader of the Opposition when election was called; Leader of the Opposition after the election.
^{3} Acclaimed.
^{4} Election returns in 1887 did not require candidates to declare party affiliation. Many candidates did not list a party affiliation.

=== Federal election, 1896 ===
Laurier won his second general election, defeating the Conservatives led by Prime Minister Charles Tupper. The main issue was the Manitoba Schools Question, which had divided the country on linguistic and religious lines. Although Tupper and the Conservatives won the popular vote, Laurier and the Liberals won the majority of seats and formed the government, the first time at the federal level that the party with the greatest popular vote support did not form the government.

Canadian Federal Election, 1896 – Parties, Leaders, Seats Won and Popular Vote
Party	Leaders	Seats Won	Popular Vote
Liberal	Wilfrid Laurier^{1}	117	41.4%
Conservative	Charles Tupper^{2}	71	44.4%
Liberal-Conservative	Charles Tupper^{2}	15	3.8%
Independent Conservative	–	4	1.3%
Patrons of Industry	–	2	3.9%
McCarthyite	Dalton McCarthy	2	1.3%
Independent	–	1	1.4%
Independent Liberal	–	1	0.2%
Nationalist	–	0	1.5%
Protestant Protective Association	–	0	0.6%
Unknown^{3}	–	0	0.2%
Total		213	100.0%
Source: Library of Parliament – History of Federal Ridings since 1867

^{1} Leader of the Opposition when election was called; Prime Minister after the election.
^{2} Prime Minister shortly after election was called; Leader of the Opposition after the election.
^{3} Election returns in 1896 did not require candidates to declare party affiliation. Some candidates did not list a party affiliation.

=== Federal election, 1900 ===
Laurier again faced Tupper in the general election of 1900. Laurier and the Liberals increased both their popular vote and seats won. Tupper retired from public life, the last of the Fathers of Confederation to leave Canadian politics.

Canadian Federal Election, 1900 – Parties, Leaders, Seats Won and Popular Vote
Party	Leaders	Seats Won	Popular Vote
Liberal	Wilfrid Laurier^{1}	128	50.3%
Conservative	Charles Tupper^{2}	69	43.2%
Liberal-Conservative	Charles Tupper^{2}	10	2.9%
Independent	–	3	1.4%
Independent Conservative	–	1	1.1%
Independent Liberal	–	1	0.5%
Independent Labour	–	1	0.4%
Labour	–	0	0.3%
Unknown^{3}	–	0	0.0%^{4}
Total		213	100.1%^{5}
Source: Library of Parliament – History of Federal Ridings since 1867

^{1} Prime Minister when election was called; Prime Minister after the election.
^{2} Leader of the Opposition when election was called; Leader of the Opposition after the election.
^{3} Election returns in 1900 did not require candidates to declare party affiliation. Some candidates did not list a party affiliation.
^{4} "Unknown" candidates only received 27 votes nationally.
^{5} Rounding error.

=== Federal election, 1904 ===
Laurier again led the Liberals in the 1904 general election. His opponent this time was Robert Laird Borden, who had replaced Tupper as leader of the Conservatives. Laurier again won a majority government.

Canadian Federal Election, 1904 – Parties, Leaders, Seats Won and Popular Vote
Party	Leaders	Seats Won	Popular Vote
Liberal	Wilfrid Laurier^{1}	137	50.9%
Conservative	Robert Laird Borden^{2}	70	44.4%
Liberal-Conservative	Robert Laird Borden^{2}	5	1.5%
Independent	–	1	1.5%
Independent Conservative	–	1	0.5%
Labour	–	0	0.2%
Socialist	–	0	0.2%
Nationalist	–	0	0.1%
Independent Liberal	–	0	0.0%^{3}
Unknown^{4}	–	0	1.1%
Total		214	100.4%^{5}
Source: Library of Parliament – History of Federal Ridings since 1867

^{1} Prime Minister when election was called; Prime Minister after the election.
^{2} Leader of the Opposition when election was called; Leader of the Opposition after the election.
^{3} Independent Liberal candidates received only 309 votes nationally.
^{4} Election returns in 1904 did not require candidates to declare party affiliation. Some candidates did not list a party affiliation.
^{5} Rounding error.

=== Federal election, 1908 ===
Laurier again led the Liberals in the 1908 general election. His opponent was again Robert Laird Borden, the leader of the Conservatives. Laurier again won a majority government, which would be his last of four victories.

Canadian Federal Election, 1908 – Parties, Leaders, Seats Won and Popular Vote
Party	Leaders	Seats Won	Popular Vote
Liberal	Wilfrid Laurier^{1}	133	48.9%
Conservative	Robert Laird Borden^{2}	82	45.0%
Liberal-Conservative	Robert Laird Borden^{2}	3	1.3%
Independent	–	1	1.5%
Labour	–	1	0.9%
Independent Conservative	–	1	0.5%
Socialist	–	0	0.5%
Independent Liberal	–	0	0.4
Unknown^{3}	–	0	1.2%
Total		213	100.2%^{4}
Source: Library of Parliament – History of Federal Ridings since 1867

^{1} Prime Minister when election was called; Prime Minister after the election.
^{2} Leader of the Opposition when election was called; Leader of the Opposition after the election.
^{3} Election returns in 1908 did not require candidates to declare party affiliation. Some candidates did not list a party affiliation.
^{4} Rounding error.

=== Federal election, 1911 ===
Laurier again led the Liberals in the 1911 general election, which was fought on the issue of reciprocity (lowered trade barriers) with the United States. Naval policy was also an issue. Laurier lost to Robert Laird Borden, the leader of the Conservatives. The loss ended Laurier's streak of four electoral victories and fifteen years as prime minister. He became Leader of the Official Opposition.

Canadian Federal Election, 1911 – Parties, Leaders, Seats Won and Popular Vote
Party	Leaders	Seats Won	Popular Vote
Conservative	Robert Laird Borden^{1}	131	48.0%
Liberal-Conservative	Robert Laird Borden^{1}	1	0.5%
Liberal	Wilfrid Laurier^{2}	85	45.8%
Independent Conservative	–	3	1.0%
Labour	–	1	0.9%
Independent	–	0	0.8%
Socialist	–	0	0.4%
Nationalist Conservative	–	0	0.3%
Nationalist	–	0	0.3%
Unknown^{3}	–	0	2.0%
Total		221	100.0%
Source: Library of Parliament – History of Federal Ridings since 1867

^{1} Leader of the Opposition when election was called; Prime Minister after the election.
^{2} Prime Minister when election was called; Leader of the Opposition after the election.
^{3} Election returns in 1911 did not require candidates to declare party affiliation. Some candidates did not list a party affiliation.

=== Federal election, 1917 ===
The 1917 election was Laurier's last election. The election was fought entirely on the issue of conscription and Canada's role in World War I. The Liberal Party split between those Liberals who supported the Borden government's policy of conscription, and the Liberals led by Laurier, who opposed it. The election badly divided the country between English-Canadians, who tended to support conscription, and French-Canadians, who opposed it. Laurier and the Laurier Liberals lost the election, with Borden winning office as the leader of a Unionist (coalition) government. Laurier remained as Leader of the Opposition, but died in 1919, ending one of the longest careers in the Parliament of Canada, almost 45 years since he was first elected in 1874.

Canadian Federal Election, 1917 – Parties, Leaders, Seats Won and Popular Vote
Party	Leaders	Seats Won	Popular Vote
Government (Unionist)	Robert Laird Borden^{1}	153	56.9%
Opposition (Laurier Liberals)	Wilfrid Laurier^{2}	82	38.8%
Labour	–	0	1.8%
Opposition – Labour	–	0	1.0%
Independent	–	0	0.6%
Independent Liberal	–	0	0.4%
Nonpartisan League	–	0	0.2%
Unknown^{3}	–	0	0.2%
Total		235	99.9%^{4}
Source: Library of Parliament – History of Federal Ridings since 1867

^{1} Leader of the Opposition when election was called; Prime Minister after the election.
^{2} Prime Minister when election was called; Leader of the Opposition after the election.
^{3} Election returns in 1911 did not require candidates to declare party affiliation. Some candidates did not list a party affiliation.
^{4} Rounding error.

== Federal constituency elections, 1874 to 1917 ==
Laurier stood for election to the House of Commons 20 times, in 1874, 1877 (twice), 1878, 1878, 1882, 1887, 1891 (twice), 1896 (three times), 1900, 1904 (twice), 1908 (twice), 1911 (twice), and 1917 (twice), although some of those were multiple elections in the same general election, as was permitted at that time. He won seventeen elections and was defeated three times.

=== 1874 Federal election: Drummond—Arthabaska ===
1874 Canadian federal election: Drummond—Arthabaska
Party	Candidate	Votes	%	Elected
Liberal	Wilfrid Laurier	778	52.64	✓
Unknown	Tessier	700	47.36	
Total valid votes		1478	100.00	
Source(s) "Drummond--Arthabaska, Quebec (1867-08-06 - 1968-04-22)". History of Federal Ridings Since 1867. Library of Parliament.

=== 1877 Federal Ministerial By-Election: Drummond—Arthabaska ===
At this time, newly appointed Cabinet ministers had to stand for re-election.

Canadian federal by-election, October 27, 1877: Drummond—Arthabaska Federal Ministerial by-election for Laurier's appointed as Minister of Inland Revenue
Party	Candidate	Votes	%	Elected
Conservative	Désiré Olivier Bourbeau	1,902	50.29	✓
Liberal	Wilfrid Laurier	1,880	49.71	
Total valid votes		3,782	100.00	
Source(s) "Drummond--Arthabaska, Quebec (1867-08-06 - 1968-04-22)". History of Federal Ridings Since 1867. Library of Parliament. Ministerial by-election, October 27, 1877: Drummond—Arthabaska, Quebec on Wilfrid Laurier's appointment as Minister of Inland Revenue, October 8, 1877

=== 1877 Federal By-Election: Quebec East ===
Canadian federal by-election, November 11, 1877: Quebec East Federal Ministerial by-election for Laurier's appointed as Minister of Inland Revenue and Isidore Thibaudeau resignation on November 7, 1877
Party	Candidate	Votes	%	Elected
Liberal	Wilfrid Laurier	1,863	54.62	✓
Conservative	Adolphe Guillet dit Tourangeau	1,548	45.38	
Total valid votes		3,411	100.00	
Source(s) "Quebec East, Quebec (1867-08-06 - 1968-04-22)". History of Federal Ridings Since 1867. Library of Parliament. Federal Ministerial by-election, November 11, 1877: Quebec East, Quebec on Wilfrid Laurier's appointment as Minister of Inland Revenue, October 8, 1877

=== 1878 Federal Election: Quebec East ===
1878 Canadian federal election: Quebec East
Party	Candidate	Votes	%	Elected
Liberal	Wilfrid Laurier	1,946	62.49	✓
Unknown	Phi. Vallières	1,168	37.51	
Total valid votes		3,114	100.00	
Source(s) "Quebec East, Quebec (1867-08-06 - 1968-04-22)". History of Federal Ridings Since 1867. Library of Parliament.

=== 1882 Federal Election: Quebec East ===
1882 Canadian federal election: Quebec East
Party	Candidate	Votes	%	Elected
Liberal	Wilfrid Laurier	1,750	57.70	✓
Unknown	J. P. Rhéaume	1,283	42.30	
Total valid votes		3,033	100.00	
Source(s) "Quebec East, Quebec (1867-08-06 - 1968-04-22)". History of Federal Ridings Since 1867. Library of Parliament.

=== 1887 Federal Election: Quebec East ===
1887 Canadian federal election: Quebec East
Party	Candidate	Votes	%	Elected
Liberal	Wilfrid Laurier	2,622	79.05	✓
Conservative	F. X. Drouin	695	20.95	
Total valid votes		3,317	100.00	
Source(s) "Quebec East, Quebec (1867-08-06 - 1968-04-22)". History of Federal Ridings Since 1867. Library of Parliament.

=== 1891 Federal Election: Quebec East ===
In the 1891 general election, Laurier stood in two constituencies as was permitted at that time: Quebec East and Richmond—Wolfe, both in Quebec. He was acclaimed in Quebec East but was defeated in Richmond–Wolfe.

1891 Canadian federal election: Quebec East
Party	Candidate	Votes	Elected
Liberal	Wilfrid Laurier	acclaimed	✓
Total valid votes		-	-
Source(s) "Quebec East, Quebec (1867-08-06 - 1968-04-22)". History of Federal Ridings Since 1867. Library of Parliament.

=== 1891 Federal Election: Richmond—Wolfe ===
In the 1891 general election, Laurier stood in two constituencies, as was permitted at that time: Richmond—Wolfe and Quebec East, both in Quebec. He won Quebec East but lost Richmond–Wolfe.

1891 Canadian federal election: Richmond—Wolfe
Party	Candidate	Votes	%	Elected
Conservative	Clarence Chester Cleveland	2,416	53.09	✓
Liberal	Wilfrid Laurier	2,135	46.91	
Total valid votes		4,551	100.00	
Source(s) "Richmond--Wolfe, Quebec (1867-08-06 - 1968-04-22)". History of Federal Ridings Since 1867. Library of Parliament.

=== 1896 Federal Election: Quebec East and Saskatchewan (Provisional District) ===
In the 1896 general election, Laurier stood in two constituencies, as was permitted at that time: Quebec East and Saskatchewan (Provisional District), North-West Territories.

He won both ridings and chose to represent Quebec East in Parliament.

1896 Canadian federal election: Quebec East
Party	Candidate	Votes	%	Elected
Liberal	Wilfrid Laurier	3,202	76.00	✓
Conservative	Cléophas Leclerc	1,011	24.00	
Total valid votes		4,213	100.00	
Source(s) "Quebec East, Quebec (1867-08-06 - 1968-04-22)". History of Federal Ridings Since 1867. Library of Parliament.

1896 Canadian federal election: Saskatchewan (Provisional District)
Party	Candidate	Votes	%	Elected
Liberal	Wilfrid Laurier	988	46.06	✓
Conservative	James McKay	944	44.01	
Independent	William Craig	213	9.93	
Total valid votes		2,145	100.00	
Source(s) "Saskatchewan (Provisional District), Northwest Territories (1886-06-02 - 1908-09-16)". History of Federal Ridings Since 1867. Library of Parliament.

=== 1896 Federal Ministerial By-Election: Quebec East ===
At this time, newly appointed Cabinet ministers had to stand for re-election. It was customary for the other party not to field a candidate.

Canadian federal by-election, July 30, 1896: Quebec East Federal Ministerial by-election for Laurier's being made Prime Minister on July 11, 1896
Party	Candidate	Votes	Elected
Liberal	Wilfrid Laurier	acclaimed	✓
Total valid votes		-	-
Source(s) "Quebec East, Quebec (1867-08-06 - 1968-04-22)". History of Federal Ridings Since 1867. Library of Parliament.

=== 1900 Federal Election: Quebec East ===
1900 Canadian federal election: Quebec East
Party	Candidate	Votes	%	Elected
Liberal	Wilfrid Laurier	3,598	81.33	✓
Conservative	Joseph-Eugène Chapleau	826	18.67	
Total valid votes		4,424	100.00	
Source(s) "Quebec East, Quebec (1867-08-06 - 1968-04-22)". History of Federal Ridings Since 1867. Library of Parliament.

=== 1904 Federal Election: Quebec East ===
In the 1904 general election, Laurier stood in two constituencies, as was permitted at that time: Quebec East and Wright, both in Quebec. He won both ridings and chose to represent Quebec East in Parliament.

1904 Canadian federal election: Quebec East
Party	Candidate	Votes	%	Elected
Liberal	Wilfrid Laurier	3,524	71.35	✓
Conservative	Michel Fiset	1,415	28.65	
Total valid votes		4,939	100.00	
Source(s) "Quebec East, Quebec (1867-08-06 - 1968-04-22)". History of Federal Ridings Since 1867. Library of Parliament.

=== 1904 Federal Election: Wright ===
In the 1904 general election, Laurier stood in two constituencies, as was permitted at that time: Wright and Quebec East, both in Quebec. He won both ridings and chose to represent Quebec East in Parliament.

1904 Canadian federal election: Wright
Party	Candidate	Votes	%	Elected
Liberal	Wilfrid Laurier	3,250	61.39	✓
Conservative	F. A. A. Labelle	2,044	38.61	
Total valid votes		5,294	100.00	
Source(s) "Wright, Quebec (1896-04-24 - 1949-04-29)". History of Federal Ridings Since 1867. Library of Parliament.

=== 1908 Federal Election: Quebec East ===
In the 1908 general election, Laurier stood in two constituencies, as was permitted at that time: Quebec East, Quebec, and Ottawa (City), Ontario. He won both ridings and chose to represent Quebec East in Parliament.

1908 Canadian federal election: Quebec East
Party	Candidate	Votes	%	Elected
Liberal	Wilfrid Laurier	3,764	70.83	✓
Conservative	Michel Fiset	1,550	29.17	
Total valid votes		5,314	100.00	
Source(s) "Quebec East, Quebec (1867-08-06 - 1968-04-22)". History of Federal Ridings Since 1867. Library of Parliament.

=== 1908 Federal Election: Ottawa (City) ===
In the 1908 general election, Laurier stood in two constituencies, as was permitted at that time: Ottawa (City), Ontario, and Quebec East, Quebec. He won both ridings and chose to represent Quebec East in Parliament.

1908 Canadian federal election: Ottawa (City of)
Party	Candidate	Votes	%	Elected
Liberal	Wilfrid Laurier	6,584	26.53	✓
Liberal	Harold McGiverin	6,388	25.74	✓
Conservative	Thomas Birkett	5,959	24.01	
Conservative	John Léo Chabot	5,890	23.73	
Total valid votes		24,821	100.00	
Source(s) "Ottawa (City of), Ontario (1867-08-06 - 1935-08-13)". History of Federal Ridings Since 1867. Library of Parliament.

=== 1911 Federal Election: Quebec East ===
In the 1911 general election, Laurier stood in two constituencies, as was permitted at that time: Quebec East and Soulanges, both in Quebec. He won both ridings and represented both seats in the new Parliament.

1911 Canadian federal election: Quebec East
Party	Candidate	Votes	Elected
Liberal	Wilfrid Laurier	acclaimed	✓
Total valid votes		-	-
Source(s) "Quebec East, Quebec (1867-08-06 - 1968-04-22)". History of Federal Ridings Since 1867. Library of Parliament.

=== 1911 Federal Election: Soulanges ===
In the 1911 general election, Laurier stood in two constituencies, as was permitted at that time: Soulanges and Quebec East, both in Quebec. He won both ridings and represented both seats in the new Parliament.

1911 Canadian federal election: Soulanges
Party	Candidate	Votes	%	Elected
Liberal	Wilfrid Laurier	1,045	53.64	✓
Conservative	Joseph-Arthur Lortie	903	46.36	
Total valid votes		1,948	100.00	
Source(s) "Soulanges, Quebec (1867-08-06 - 1917-10-05)". History of Federal Ridings Since 1867. Library of Parliament.

=== 1917 Federal Election: Quebec East ===
In the 1917 general election, Laurier stood in two constituencies, as was permitted at that time: Quebec East, Quebec, and Ottawa (City), Ontario. He won Quebec East but was defeated in Ottawa (City).

1917 Canadian federal election: Quebec East
Party	Candidate	Votes	%	Elected
Opposition (Laurier Liberals)	Wilfrid Laurier	6,957	92.53	✓
Government (Unionist)	Ferdinand Omer Drouin	562	7.47	
Total valid votes		7,519	100.00	
Source(s) "Quebec East, Quebec (1867-08-06 - 1968-04-22)". History of Federal Ridings Since 1867. Library of Parliament.

=== 1917 Federal Election: Ottawa (City) ===
In the 1917 general election, Laurier stood in two constituencies, as was permitted at that time: Ottawa (City), Ontario, and Quebec East, Quebec. He was defeated in Ottawa (City) but elected in Quebec East.

1917 Canadian federal election: Ottawa (City of)
Party	Candidate	Votes	%	Elected
Government (Unionist)	Alfred Ernest Fripp	18,547	29.33	✓
Government (Unionist)	John Léo Chabot	18,312	28.96	✓
Opposition (Laurier Liberals)	Wilfrid Laurier	13,289	21.02	
Opposition (Laurier Liberals)	Harold McGiverin	13,077	20.68	
Total valid votes		63,225	100.00	
Source(s) "Ottawa (City of), Ontario (1867-08-06 - 1935-08-13)". History of Federal Ridings Since 1867. Library of Parliament.

== Quebec Constituency Election, 1871: Drummond-Arthabaska ==
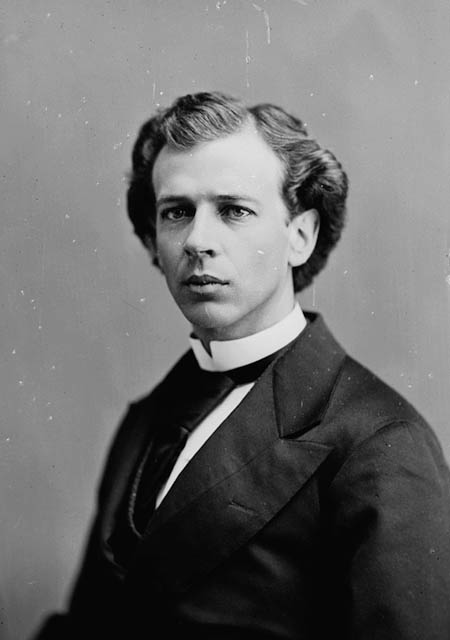
Laurier in 1874.

Laurier stood for election to the Quebec National Assembly in 1871. He resigned in 1874 to enter federal politics.

Quebec Election, 1871: Drummond-Arthabaska
Party	Candidate	Popular Vote	%
Liberal	Yes Wilfrid Laurier	1,767	63.5%
Conservative	X Edward John Hemming	1,017	36.5%
Total		2,784	100.0%
Source: Assemblée Nationale: Les résultats électoraux depuis 1867, D'Arcy-McGee à Duplessis.

Yes Elected.
X Incumbent.

== See also ==
- Electoral history of Charles Tupper – Laurier's predecessor as prime minister and principal opponent in two general elections.
- Electoral history of Robert Borden – Laurier's successor as prime minister and principal opponent in four general elections.
- Electoral history of William Lyon Mackenzie King – Laurier's successor as leader of the Liberal Party.
