= List of members of the Canadian House of Commons with military service (C) =

Name	Elected party	Constituency	Elected date	Military service
Léo Alphonse Joseph Cadieux	Liberal	Terrebonne	June 18, 1962	Canadian Army (1941–1944)
Charles Hazlitt Cahan	Conservative	St. Lawrence—St. George	October 29, 1925	Canadian Army
Thomas Boyd Caldwell	Liberal	Lanark North	November 3, 1904	Militia (1888–1893)
Colin Cameron	Co-operative Commonwealth Federation	Nanaimo	August 10, 1953	Canadian Army (1915–1919)
John Charles Alexander Cameron	Liberal	Hastings South	October 14, 1935	Canadian Army
Charles James Campbell	Conservative	Victoria	December 17, 1874	Militia (1840–1869)
Colin Alexander Campbell	Liberal	Frontenac—Addington	September 24, 1934	Canadian Army (1939–1945)
Glenlyon Campbell	Conservative	Dauphin	October 26, 1908	Militia (1885), Canadian Army (1914–1917)
Grant Campbell	Progressive Conservative	Stormont	March 31, 1958	Canadian Army
Stewart Campbell	Anti-Confederate	Guysborough	September 20, 1867	Militia
Ralph Osborne Campney	Liberal	Vancouver Centre	June 27, 1949	Canadian Army, Royal Flying Corps (1915–1919)
Charles-Arthur Dumoulin Cannon	Liberal	Îles-de-la-Madeleine	June 27, 1949	Canadian Army (1942–1949)
Reg Cantelon	Progressive Conservative	Kindersley	April 8, 1963	Canadian Army (1939–1945)
Thomas Cantley	Conservative	Pictou	October 29, 1925	British Army (1915–1916)
Louis-Joseph-Lucien Cardin	Liberal	Richelieu—Verchères	October 6, 1952	Royal Canadian Navy (1941–1945)
Jean Guy Carignan	Liberal	Quebec East	November 27, 2000	Canadian Army (1957–1961)
George Caron	Conservative	Maskinongé	September 20, 1867	Militia
Jean-Baptiste Thomas Caron	Liberal	City of Ottawa	December 23, 1907	Canadian Army (1914–1918)
Franklin Metcalfe Carpenter	Conservative	Wentworth South	February 22, 1887	Militia (1872–1897)
Donald Carrick	Liberal	Trinity	November 8, 1954	Canadian Army (1940–1945)
John James Carrick	Conservative	Thunder Bay and Rainy River	September 21, 1911	Canadian Army
William F. Carroll	Liberal	Cape Breton South	September 21, 1911	Canadian Army (1916-)
Chesley William Carter	Liberal	Burin—Burgeo	June 27, 1949	Royal Newfoundland Regiment (1917–1919), Canadian Army (1941–1946)
Frank Broadstreet Carvell	Liberal	Carleton	November 3, 1904	Militia
Wilfrid Garfield Case	Progressive Conservative	Grey North	February 5, 1945	Royal Flying Corps (1917–1919)
George Elliott Casey	Liberal	Elgin West	October 12, 1872	Militia
Arza Clair Casselman	Conservative	Grenville	December 6, 1921	Canadian Army
Cora Taylor Casselman	Liberal	Edmonton East	June 2, 1941	Canadian Army
Frederick Clayton Casselman	Liberal	Edmonton East	March 26, 1940	Canadian Army (1916–1919)
Orren D. Casselman	Unionist	Dundas	December 17, 1917	Canadian Army
George Hugh Castleden	Co-operative Commonwealth Federation	Yorkton	March 26, 1940	Canadian Army (1917–1918)
Joseph-Édouard Cauchon	Conservative	Montmorency	September 20, 1867	Militia
Harry Peter Cavers	Liberal	Lincoln	June 27, 1949	Royal Canadian Navy (1942–1945)
John Léo Chabot	Conservative	City of Ottawa	September 21, 1911	Canadian Army
Brown Chamberlin	Conservative	Missisquoi	September 20, 1867	Militia
Alan Chambers	Liberal	Nanaimo	March 26, 1940	Canadian Army
Egan Chambers	Progressive Conservative	St. Lawrence—St. George	March 31, 1958	Canadian Army
George Louis Chatterton	Progressive Conservative	Esquimalt—Saanich	May 29, 1961	Royal Canadian Air Force (1942–1946)
Ray Chénier	Liberal	Timmins—Chapleau	May 22, 1979	Canadian Army (1956–1958)
Leverett de Veber Chipman	Liberal	Kings	June 23, 1870	Militia
Corneliu Chisu	Conservative	Pickering-Scarborough East	May 2, 2011	Canadian Army
Gordon Chown	Progressive Conservative	Winnipeg South	June 10, 1957	Canadian Army
Gordon Minto Churchill	Progressive Conservative	Winnipeg South Centre	June 25, 1951	Canadian Army (1916–1945)
Gordon Drummond Clancy	Progressive Conservative	Yorkton	March 31, 1958	Royal Air Force (1935–1947)
Hugh Clark	Conservative	Bruce North	September 21, 1911	Militia (1906–1911)
John Arthur Clark	Conservative	Burrard	December 6, 1921	Canadian Army (1915–1919)
Brooke Claxton	Liberal	St. Lawrence—St. George	March 26, 1940	Canadian Army
Hughes Cleaver	Liberal	Halton	October 14, 1935	Canadian Army
Clarence Chester Cleveland	Conservative	Richmond—Wolfe	March 5, 1891	Militia (1888–1899)
Kenneth Judson Cochrane	Liberal	Cumberland	October 14, 1935	Canadian Army (1943–1944)
Alan Cockeram	National Government	York South	March 26, 1940	Canadian Army (1918-)
William Foster Cockshutt	Conservative	Brantford	November 3, 1904	Canadian Army
Joseph-Roland Comtois	Liberal	Joliette—l'Assomption—Montcalm	November 8, 1965	Canadian Army (1949–1968), Canadian Forces Land Force Command (1968–1971)
James Conmee	Liberal	Thunder Bay and Rainy River	November 3, 1904	United States Army
Charles Henry "Chuck" Cook	Progressive Conservative	North Vancouver—Burnaby	May 22, 1979	Canadian Forces Land Force Command
Richard Clive Cooper	Unionist	Vancouver South	December 17, 1917	Militia, Canadian Army (1914-)
Robert Alfred Corbett	Progressive Conservative	Fundy—Royal	October 16, 1978	Canadian Forces Land Force Command
Maxime Cormier	Conservative	Restigouche—Madawaska	July 28, 1930	Canadian Army
James Neilson Corry	Liberal	Perth	June 27, 1949	Canadian Army
Charles Jérémie Coulombe	Conservative	Maskinongé	February 22, 1887	Militia (1882–1902)
Michel Charles Joseph Coursol	Conservative	Montreal East	September 17, 1878	Militia
Walter Davy Cowan	Unionist	Regina	December 17, 1917	Canadian Army
James Crawford	Conservative	Brockville	September 20, 1867	Militia (1866–1871)
John Crawford	Liberal	Portage la Prairie	November 3, 1904	Militia (1885)
John Willoughby Crawford	Conservative	Leeds South	September 20, 1867	Militia (1861–1863)
William Lawrence Marven Creaghan	Progressive Conservative	Westmorland	March 31, 1958	Canadian Army
Patrick Dermott Crofton	Progressive Conservative	Esquimalt—Saanich	September 4, 1984	Royal Canadian Navy
David Arnold Croll	Liberal	Spadina	June 11, 1945	Canadian Army (1939–1945)
Hume Cronyn	Unionist	London	December 17, 1917	Militia (1899–1907)
Lloyd Crouse	Progressive Conservative	Queens—Lunenburg	June 10, 1957	Royal Canadian Air Force
Frederick William Cumberland	Conservative	Algoma	June 10, 1957	Royal Canadian Air Force
Douglas Cunnington	Conservative	Calgary West	September 18, 1939	Canadian Army (1930-)
John Allister Currie	Conservative	Simcoe North	October 26, 1908	Militia (1892-), Canadian Army (1914-)
Morley Currie	Liberal	Prince Edward	October 26, 1908	Canadian Army (1907–1920)
Alexandre Cyr	Liberal	Gaspé	April 8, 1963	Canadian Army (1941–1943)
