= Gordon Cameron Edwards =

Canadian politician (1866–1946)

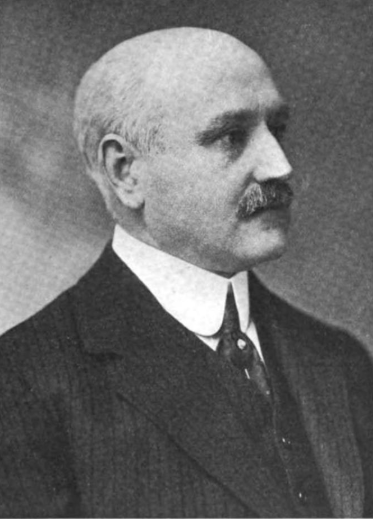

Member of Parliament for Ottawa (City of)
- In office September 1926 – May 1930
- Preceded by: John Léo Chabot; Stewart McClenaghan
- Succeeded by: T. Franklin Ahearn

Personal details
- Born: Gordon Cameron Edwards; 12 November 1866 Thurso, Canada East
- Died: 2 November 1946 (aged 79) Ottawa, Ontario, Canada
- Party: Liberal
- Spouse(s): Edna Stewart Meighen m. 11 June 1895
- Profession: Lumber merchant

Gordon Cameron Edwards (12 November 1866 – 2 November 1946) was a Liberal party member of the House of Commons of Canada. He was born in Thurso and became a lumber merchant.

The son of John Cameron Edwards and Margaret Cameron, and a nephew of William Cameron Edwards, he was president of Ottawa-based companies W.C. Edwards and Company Limited and Edwards Lumber and Pulp Limited. His brother Cameron Macpherson Edwards would also be President of W.C. Edwards and owned Harrington Lake (now retreat of the Prime Minister of Canada). He was also president, vice-president and director of various other firms.

He was elected to Parliament at the City of Ottawa riding with fellow Liberal Edgar-Rodolphe-Eugène Chevrier in the 1926 general election. After completing his only term in the House of Commons, the 16th Canadian Parliament, Edwards left federal politics and did not seek re-election in the 1930 vote.

In 1923, he became owner of the residence at 24 Sussex Drive. In 1943, a federal eviction notice was served on Edwards. He appealed the notice and was awarded $140,000 plus costs in 1946. Edwards continued to live in the house until his death later that year.
