= Albert Allard =

Canadian politician

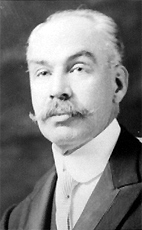

Member of Parliament for City of Ottawa
- In office 1910–1911
- Preceded by: Harold B. McGiverin
- Succeeded by: Alfred Ernest Fripp

Personal details
- Born: 1860 Montreal, Canada East
- Died: May 1, 1941 (aged 80–81) Ottawa, Ontario, Canada
- Party: Liberal
- Profession: store owner

Albert Allard (1860 – May 1, 1941) was a Canadian politician and store owner. He was elected in 1910 as a Member of the House of Commons of Canada for the riding of the City of Ottawa, Ontario, and a member of the Liberal Party. He served for only 1 year, 7 months and 22 days.

Born in Montreal, Canada East, the son of Jean-Baptiste Allard, he was educated at the Notre-Dame School of the Brothers of Christian Schools and came to Ottawa in 1872. He first worked as a grocery clerk, later becoming head of a wholesale grocery company. In 1885, he married Matilde Roberge. Allard was elected to the House of Commons in a 1910 by-election held after Wilfrid Laurier resigned his seat.
