= William Mackintosh (engineer) =

Captain William Mackintosh was an Irish-born British Army officer and Canadian surveyor and engineer.

== Parentage and family ==
He was born in County Wicklow, Ireland, the son of Captain Duncan Mackintosh, an officer in the British Army's Highland regiment despatched to Ireland to suppress the Irish Rebellion of 1798. His mother was the niece of the Earl of Dysart. He married Leonora Sophia, daughter of Col. Dickinson, of Jamaica, British West Indies, who claimed to be closely related to Sir Stamford Raffles, founder of Singapore. He was the father of the Honourable Charles Herbert Mackintosh, Canadian journalist and public official.

== Education and career ==
He was educated in Dublin and later joined the British Army's Ordnance Department with which he was sent to British North America. He served at London, Canada West, and Kingston, Canada West.

He later worked on the survey of the Great Western Railway's line from Hamilton, Canada West to Chatham, Canada West. At the birth of his son, Charles, in 1843, and for many years, he was County Engineer of Middlesex County, Ontario with responsibility for directing the mapping and planning of county-wide road systems and other engineering and surveying projects.

== Death ==
Details of his death are unclear, though he is noted as having died before 1877, leaving a widow and several sons and daughters.
