= Robert Stewart (Canadian politician) =

Canadian politician

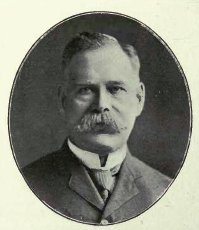

Member of the Canadian Parliament for Ottawa
- In office 1904–1908 Serving with Napoléon Belcourt
- Preceded by: Thomas Birkett
- Succeeded by: Wilfrid Laurier; Thomas Birkett

Personal details
- Born: April 7, 1850 Ottawa, Canada West
- Died: April 10, 1925 (aged 75) Ottawa, Ontario, Canada
- Party: Liberal

Robert Stewart (April 7, 1850 – April 10, 1925) was a Canadian politician.

He was born in Ottawa, Ontario, the son of William Stewart and Sarah Jane Donaldson, migrants from Northern Ireland. Stewart was educated in Ottawa's public school system along with his brothers, J.K., William and Samuel, and continued to take an active interest in the school system's development throughout his life. An insurance and general agent with his firm R. Stewart & Son, he was an alderman on the Ottawa City Council, where he was said to have "represented the city's monied classes," and was president and treasurer of the YMCA. He was elected to the House of Commons of Canada as the Liberal member for Ottawa in the 1904 federal election that returned a third straight majority for Liberal Prime Minister Sir Wilfrid Laurier. He resigned the riding in 1908 shortly before that year's general election.

In 1877, Stewart married Mary Louisa Howard Sharp. He died in Ottawa at the age of 75.

He is unrelated to the formerly prominent Ottawa family of William Stewart, who owned a large portion of The Glebe and who was father of Ottawa mayor McLeod Stewart, a contemporary of Robert on the Ottawa City Council.
