= Charles Herbert Mackintosh =

Canadian politician (1843–1931)

The Honourable Charles Herbert Mackintosh
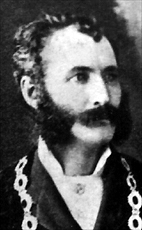

6th Lieutenant Governor of the North-West Territories
- In office October 31, 1893 – May 30, 1898
- Monarch: Victoria
- Governor General: The Earl of Aberdeen
- Premier: Frederick W. A. G. Haultain
- Preceded by: Joseph Royal
- Succeeded by: Malcolm Colin Cameron

Member of the Canadian Parliament for Ottawa
- In office June 20, 1882 – February 22, 1887
- Preceded by: Joseph Tassé
- Succeeded by: William Goodhue Perley
- In office April 26, 1890 – October 31, 1893
- Preceded by: William Goodhue Perley
- Succeeded by: Honoré Robillard

13th Mayor of Ottawa
- In office 1878–1883
- Preceded by: C. W. Bangs
- Succeeded by: Pierre St. Jean

Personal details
- Born: May 13, 1843 London, Canada West
- Died: December 22, 1931 (aged 88) Ottawa, Ontario, Canada
- Party: Liberal-Conservative
- Spouses: Gertrude Niles Cook (m. 1868) Eliza Jane Reid (m. 1895)
- Relations: Captain William Mackintosh, father
- Children: 2 sons and 7 daughters
- Education: Caradoc Academy
- Occupation: Journalist, lawyer, orator, writer, and poet
- Profession: Politician

The Honourable Charles Herbert Mackintosh (May 13, 1843 – December 22, 1931) was a Canadian journalist and author, newspaper owner and editor, and politician. He served as mayor of Ottawa from 1879 to 1881, represented the City of Ottawa as a Liberal-Conservative Member of Parliament in the House of Commons of Canada from 1882 to 1887, and from 1890 to 1893, and served as Lieutenant Governor of the North-West Territories from 1893 to 1898, as it underwent a major transition toward responsible government.

A document commissioned by the Alberta Legislative Assembly states:

"Mackintosh was one of three Lieutenant Governors of the jurisdictional antecedents of the Province of Alberta to serve in the capacity of mayor prior to being appointed to the North-West Territories’ Vice-Regal Office. It was largely due to his efforts that a very successful Dominion Territorial Exhibitionwas held in Regina in 1895. Mackintosh was 50 years of age at the time of his swearing-in as Lieutenant Governor."

== Family Background and Aristocratic Lineage ==
Mackintosh was born in London, Canada West, on May 13, 1843, into the family of Leonora Raffles Dickenson and Captain William Mackintosh (b. ca.1809) of Wicklow, Ireland, an officer posted to Canada with the British Army's Ordnance Department, who later served as County Engineer for Middlesex County, Ontario.

His maternal grandfather was Colonel Dickenson, a planter from the West Indies. His mother was the niece of Sir Thomas Stamford Bingley Raffles, founder of the port of Singapore and Lieutenant Governor of Java (1811-1815) and of British Bencooleen (1811-1823) in Sumatra.

His paternal grandfather was Captain Duncan Mackintosh, a Scotsman who had been sent to Ireland with the British Army's Highland regiment during the Irish Rebellion of 1798. The Mackintosh family was of ‘ancient Scottish lineage.’

After the Rebellion, he bought an estate in County Wicklow, and in 1802, married, at Dublin, Alicia Weldon, who is variously described as being the daughter of Lady Weldon, and a niece of the Earl of Dysart, though which ones are meant is not specified. C.H. Mackintosh's mother was Leonora Sophia (d. 1891), daughter of Col. Dickinson, of Jamaica, British West Indies. Through the maternal line, Mackintosh claimed to be close kin to Sir Stamford Raffles, founder of Singapore, one of whose sisters was called Leonora, and one of whose half-aunts, Elizabeth Raffles, married William Carter, Esq., of Jamaica. Paternally, he claimed to be a near relation of the essayist and politician, the Right Honourable Sir James Mackintosh, who was member of the Kellachie branch of the Inverness-shire-based Clan Mackintosh, part of the Scottish Highlands Chattan Confederation.

In addition to C.H. Mackintosh's ties to the ruling class, there is occasional confusion with another Mackintosh author, Charles Henry Mackintosh (1820–1896), a prolific Plymouth Brethren author and evangelist, who was known principally by the initials, C. H. M., which happen to coincide with those of the present subject. Details in this second man's biography indicate that the elder and younger C. H. Mackintoshes were possibly uncle and nephew, or, at least, related (see References).

In nineteenth century colonial Canada, these exalted family connections in Britain and the Empire may have played a role in fostering Mackintosh's ambitions, and aiding him in his later advancement. Coupled with his innate talents, they may also have served to mark him in Conservative Party political circles where, in 1893, Canada's Prime Minister Sir John Thompson clearly viewed him as the more suitable vice-regal candidate over rival fellow Tory, Nicholas Flood Davin, whose own chagrin at Mackintosh's appointment is well documented.

== Education, journalism, and public career ==
=== Training and journalism ===
Educated at Galt Grammar School and Caradoc Academy, he first began the study of law but instead, in 1862, entered the trade of journalism. He first served as city editor of the London Free Press, later acting as city editor of the Hamilton Times. He edited the Parkhill Gazette, and served as managing editor of the Chicago Journal of Commerce. During his time in Strathroy, Ontario, he was editor and proprietor of the Strathroy Dispatch. In 1873, he was also elected to the town council of Strathroy, Ontario, at a time when this was apparently not prohibited as a conflict of interest in an era of openly partisan journalism.

In 1874, he acquired the Ottawa Daily Citizen, serving as its owner and editor-in-chief from 1874 to 1892. He was owner and editor of the Canadian Parliamentary Companion from 1877 to 1882.

On 6 August 1875, he won the gold and silver medals offered by the St. Patrick's Society during the O'Connell centenary at Major's Hill Park in Ottawa for a prize poem entitled, The Irish Liberator. He was also president of the Parliamentary Press Gallery, Ottawa, in 1879.

=== Public life ===
He served as chairman for the Dominion Exhibition in 1879, and as president of the Agricultural Association in 1881.

After only one year, 1873, on the Strathroy town council, he served as 13th Mayor of Ottawa from 1879 to 1881. Elected as a Conservative, he was returned as a Member of Parliament for the riding of Ottawa City in the House of Commons of Canada from 1882 to 1887 and again from 1890 to 1893. He was unsuccessful in contesting the constituency of Russell, Ontario in the 1887 Dominion election.

He was appointed Lieutenant Governor of the Northwest Territories in 1893, serving in that capacity until his resignation in 1898. During his tenure of the territorial vice-regal office, he promoted a great Territorial Exhibition which was opened by His Excellency the Earl of Aberdeen, Governor General of the Dominion of Canada at Regina, district of Assiniboia, N.W.T., on 30 July 1895. For these services he was presented with an oil portrait of himself in August 1895.

Following his vice-regency, he contested unsuccessfully the provincial seat of Rossland, British Columbia in 1900, and the riding of Kootenay, British Columbia in the Dominion general elections of 1900 and 1904, all in the Conservative or Liberal-Conservative interest.

=== Later career ===
In 1898, he became Canadian manager of the British American Mining Company, Rossland, British Columbia, later becoming a broker and financial agent in Victoria, British Columbia. In 1898, he sold the Le Roi mining property.

In 1901, on behalf of the miners of British Columbia, he presented two unusual gold nuggets to King Edward VII and, his wife, Queen Alexandra.

== Character ==
The Montreal Gazette described him as "a tactful, capable and experienced public man", while the Toronto Telegram declared him to be "warm hearted, amiable and altogether likeable".

== Interests and affiliations ==
He was a life director of the Carleton County Protestant Home for the Aged in Ottawa, Ontario.

In politics, he was a Liberal-Conservative, being noted as "an imperialist of no uncertain sound", and served as vice-president of the British Empire League in Canada. In religion, he was an Anglican. He was a member of two gentleman's clubs, the Union Club, Victoria, British Columbia, and of the Vancouver Club, Vancouver, British Columbia.

== Publications ==
He was author of the Liberal-Conservative Handbook (1876), and wrote a prize essay entitled Potential Resources of British Columbia (1908). For the Canadian Magazine, he wrote various articles including one entitled, British America's Golden Gateway to the Orient.

== Family and death ==
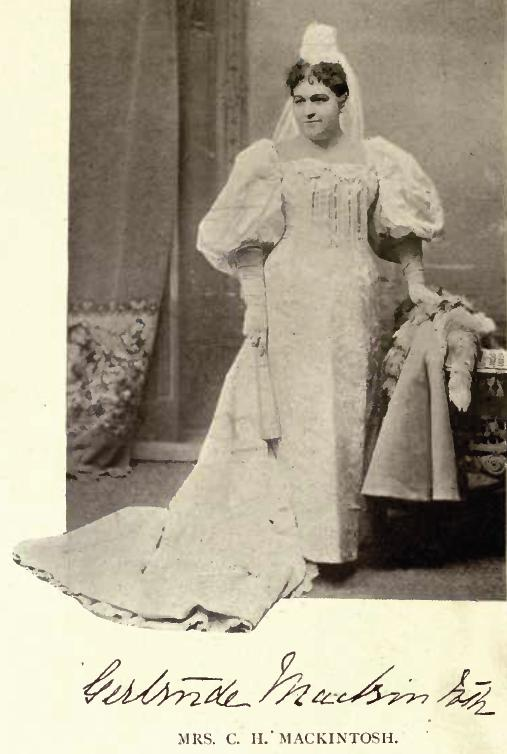
Gertrude Mackintosh by William James Topley in a costume she wore in February 1896 at a Fancy Dress Ball given at Ottawa by the Earl and Countess of Aberdeen

Mackintosh married in April 1868, Gertrude Niles Cook (d. 1925), daughter of Timothy Cook, J.P., of Strathroy, Ontario, and his wife, Harriet Terry, the daughter of Dr William Terry, ex-M.P.P., Niagara, and granddaughter of Parshall Terry, M.H.A., a United Empire Loyalist, and member of the 1st Parliament of Upper Canada. Mrs Mackintosh was born at Strathroy, Ontario, and educated at a convent at London, Ontario. While wife of the mayor of Ottawa, in 1879, she assisted at the opening of the first Dominion Exhibition. Later, she assisted at the opening of the great North-West Exhibition, held in Regina in 1895. She served as vice-president in the Territories for the National Council of Women.

The couple had two sons and seven daughters. The eldest daughter, Gertrude, married Sandford Hall Fleming, eldest son of Sir Sandford Fleming, the inventor of Standard Time, while another daughter, Marion, divorced wife of Alfred Louis Castellain, became, secretly, in 1906, the wife of Sir Frederick W. A. G. Haultain, the man her father had appointed as first premier of the Northwest Territories in 1897. His daughter Alice Maude, born on November 11, 1872, married Canadian lawyer and Liberal politician Harold Buchanan McGiverin. Of the sons: the elder, Edward Compton Mackintosh, died of a fever, on 28 January 1901, at Pretoria, while he was serving as a private in the Canadian contingent with Lord Strathcona's Horse fighting in the Second Boer War. The younger, Charles St Lawrence Mackintosh, who had served as his father's personal secretary and aide-de-camp when he was N.W.T. lieutenant governor, first married Eileen White of Quebec City, granddaughter of Sir Hugh Allan, in 1899. They had a son, Charles Allan Mackintosh, born in 1901. Divorced in 1906, he remarried, in 1908, to Kate Totten Putnam (d.1919), and was married for the last time, in 1927, to Lillie Tupper Cameron, whose mother was the eldest child of Canadian Conservative Prime Minister Sir Charles Tupper, 1st Baronet.

The Hon. C. H. Mackintosh died in 1931 and was buried in Beechwood Cemetery in Ottawa, Ontario, alongside his wife who had predeceased him in 1925.

== Archives ==
There is a Charles Herbert Mackintosh fonds at Library and Archives Canada. Archival reference number is R4507.

== Bibliography ==
- Perry, Sandra E.; Powell, Karen L. (2006), On Behalf of the Crown: Lieutenant Governors of the North-West Territories and Alberta 1869–2005, Alberta: Legislative Assembly of Alberta
- Thompson, John Herd (1994). "Davin, Nicholas Flood". In Cook, Ramsay; Hamelin, Jean (eds.). Dictionary of Canadian Biography. Vol. XIII (1901–1910) (online ed.). University of Toronto Press.

Political offices
| Preceded by C. W. Bangs | Mayor of Ottawa; 1879–1881 | Succeeded by Pierre St. Jean |
