= William Goodhue Perley =

Canadian politician

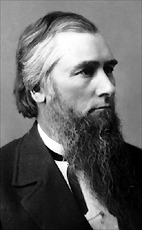

Member of the Canadian Parliament for Ottawa (Note: From 1872 through the riding's dissolution in 1935, two MPs represented this electoral district at any one time.)
- In office 1887–1890
- Preceded by: Charles Herbert Mackintosh; Joseph Tassé
- Succeeded by: Charles Herbert Mackintosh

Personal details
- Born: June 4, 1820; Enfield, New Hampshire, United States
- Died: April 1, 1890 (aged 69); Ottawa, Ontario, Canada
- Political party: Conservative
- Spouse(s): Mabel Elvira Ticknor Stevens; Georgiana Maria Gale
- Children: George Halsey Perley

William Goodhue Perley (June 4, 1820 – April 1, 1890) was a Canadian businessman and member of the House of Commons of Canada from 1887 to 1890.

He was born in Enfield, New Hampshire in 1820. His emigrant ancestor was Allan Perley. During the 1840s, he established a lumber business based on timber from northern New York. As high quality wood became harder to find, Perley and his partner, Gordon B. Pattee, decided to relocate to the Ottawa Valley and established sawmills near Ottawa supplying wood to the United States.

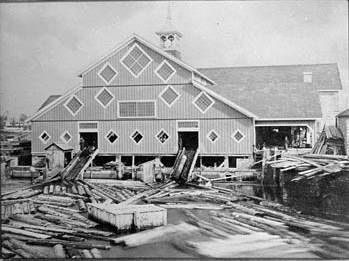
Perley and Pattee's Sawmill, at Chaudière Falls near Ottawa

With other timber interests, in 1866, he helped establish the Ottawa City Passenger Railway Company, a system of horse-drawn trams, which provided transportation for people but also moved lumber from the sawmills to ships and trains. Perley, with J.R. Booth and others, helped develop railways in the region, including the Canada Atlantic Railway and the Ottawa, Arnprior & Parry Sound Railway.

He failed in an attempt to become the Liberal-Conservative Party candidate for Ottawa City in 1882, but was later elected as a Conservative in the same riding in 1887.

Although his business had originally benefited from reciprocal trade agreements between Canada and the United States, later in life, he supported protective tariffs to help develop the economy of Canada.

Perley died in Ottawa in 1890 while still in office.
