= Stewart McClenaghan =

Canadian politician

Member of Parliament for Ottawa (City of)
- In office October 1925 – September 1926
- Preceded by: Harold McGiverin
- Succeeded by: Edgar-Rodolphe-Eugène Chevrier

Personal details
- Born: 14 July 1866 Oxford Mills, Canada West
- Died: 22 March 1944 (aged 76) Toronto, Ontario, Canada
- Party: Conservative
- Spouse(s): Matilda Lyon m. 19 August 1895
- Profession: Clothing merchant

Stewart McClenaghan (14 July 1866 – 22 March 1944) was a Conservative member of the House of Commons of Canada. He was born in Oxford Mills, Ontario and became a clothing retailer.

The son of William John McClenaghan and Sarah Boyd, he was educated in Ottawa and went into business there.

From 1900 to 1908, he served as a public school trustee. From 1908 to 1911, he was a member of the Collegiate Board. In 1912, he became controller for the city of Ottawa. McClenaghan also served as president of the Liberal-Conservative Association from 1914 to 1918. In 1917, he was president of the Central Canada Exhibition Association.

He was elected to Parliament at the Ottawa (City of) riding in the 1925 general election. After serving his only term, the 15th Canadian Parliament, McClenaghan was defeated in the 1926 election by Edgar-Rodolphe-Eugène Chevrier of the Liberals.

His great-great grandson is actor and model Robbie Amell.
