= 24 Sussex Drive =

Official residence of the Prime Minister of Canada

- 24, promenade Sussex
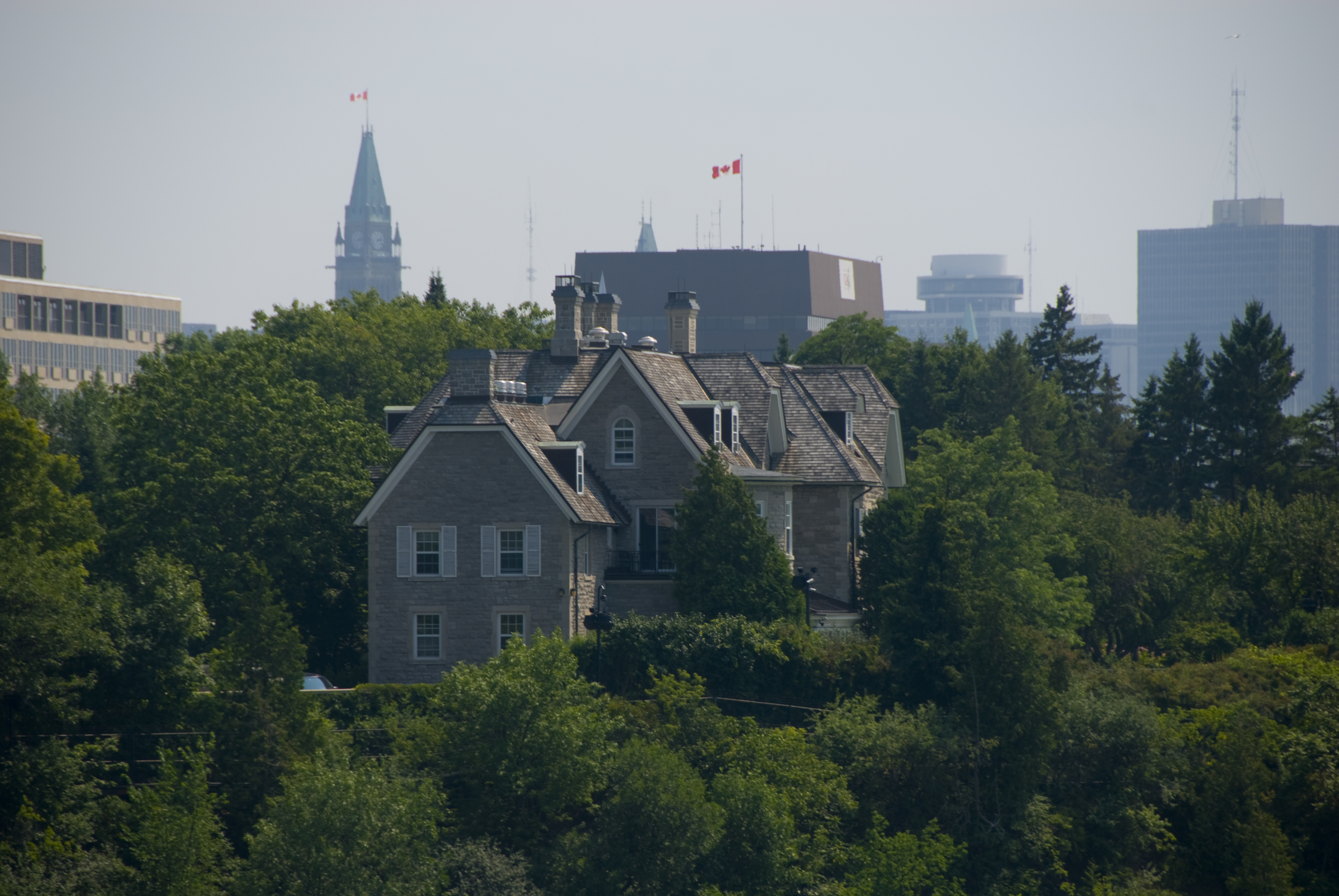
- The official residence in July 2010
- Former names: Gorffwysfa

General information
- Status: Pending renovation
- Architectural style: Norman Revival
- Location: 24 Sussex Drive, Ottawa, Ontario K1M 1P5, Canada
- Coordinates: 45°26′40″N 75°41′38″W
- Construction started: 1866; 160 years ago
- Completed: 1868; 158 years ago
- Renovated: 1950; 2027 (pending)
- Owner: The King in Right of Canada
- Operator: National Capital Commission

Technical details
- Floor count: 3
- Floor area: 15,220 sq ft (1,414 m^{2})
- Grounds: 1.9 ha (4.7 acres)

Design and construction
- Architect: Joseph Merrill Currier
- Known for: Official residence of the prime minister of Canada

Website
- ncc-ccn.gc.ca/places/24-sussex-drive

24 Sussex Drive (French: 24, promenade Sussex) is the official residence of the prime minister of Canada, in the New Edinburgh neighbourhood of Ottawa, Ontario. Built between 1866 and 1868 by Joseph Merrill Currier, it has been the official home of the prime minister since 1951. It is one of two official residences made available to the prime minister, the Harrington Lake estate in nearby Gatineau Park being the other. 24 Sussex Drive has not been in use as a residence since 2015.

== History ==
The house at 24 Sussex Drive was originally commissioned in 1866 by lumberman and member of Parliament Joseph Merrill Currier as a wedding gift for his wife-to-be Hannah Wright. The house was designed by Currier's brother, Massachusetts architect James Currier. It was completed in 1868 and Currier named it Gorffwysfa (Welsh for 'place of rest'). In 1870, Currier added a ballroom to the house to accommodate a visit by Prince Arthur, the future Duke of Connaught.

The house was sold for $30,000 in 1901, after Hannah Currier's death, to William Edwards, a lumber manufacturer, MP and future senator. In 1908, Edwards undertook a major renovation of the house adding a round tower, a porte-cochére and an ornate bay window. In the 1920s, the house passed to Edwards's nephew Gordon Edwards, who would later become an MP.

In 1943, the Government of Canada used its power of expropriation to divest Gordon Edwards of his title to the house, to consolidate Crown ownership of the lands along the Ottawa River. Edwards had fought the action, but eventually lost the dispute with the Canadian government in 1946 and died at the house later that year. Between 1946 and 1947, the house was used by the Australian High Commission.

After several years of uncertainty, the government decided to refurbish the property as a residence for the prime minister, the renovations costing just over $500,000. In 1949, the Department of Public Works hired Toronto architecture firm Allward & Gouinlock to do a major renovation. They removed the turret, front porch and bay window; joined together windows and simplified arches. The result was a fusion of château and Georgian revival styles.

In 1975, Pierre Trudeau added an indoor swimming pool in separate building on the grounds of 24 Sussex Drive.

Security at 24 Sussex was overhauled following an attempted assassination on November 5, 1995, by André Dallaire, who wandered around the house and grounds for nearly an hour before being confronted outside Jean Chrétien's bedroom by the Prime Minister's wife, Aline; she locked the door to the bedroom while Jean guarded it with an Inuit stone carving. Ultimately, Royal Canadian Mounted Police officers arrested Dallaire. Measures put in place after the incident included the addition of several more guards and security cameras to the house's attaché, and the installation of crash-proof barriers within the main gates.

In the 1990s, the house started to show signs of decay. In 2023, the house was stripped of its furnishings, leaving it as an empty shell.

=== Prime minister's residence ===
Before Louis St. Laurent, prime ministers lived at a variety of locations around Ottawa: Wilfrid Laurier and William Lyon Mackenzie King, for instance, lived at Laurier House in Sandy Hill. Laurier House was willed to the Crown upon Mackenzie King's death in 1950 and was thus also available for designation as the prime minister's official residence at the time.

Louis St. Laurent was the first prime minister to take up residence at 24 Sussex Drive in 1951. Since then, until 2015, every prime minister resided at 24 Sussex for the duration of their times in office, with one exception; Kim Campbell resided at Harrington Lake during her brief term, as her predecessor Brian Mulroney remained at 24 Sussex temporarily (despite having resigned as prime minister, as per agreement with Campbell) pending renovations of his Montreal home; Campbell's government was defeated in the 1993 election on October 25 (had Campbell continued in office then she would have moved into 24 Sussex). Stephen Harper is the most recent prime minister to have resided at 24 Sussex Drive, leaving in 2015. Although it was his childhood home when his father was Prime Minister, in 2015 Justin Trudeau opted to reside at Rideau Cottage, pending a review of work needed to repair 24 Sussex. Upon taking office as Prime Minister in 2025, Mark Carney has also resided at Rideau Cottage. The residence has been described as "uninhabitable" by officials.

=== Disrepair and renovation ===
Since the renovation of the house in 2001, very little has been spent on upkeep of 24 Sussex Drive, leaving parts of it worn and outdated, including the heating and cooling systems, wiring, and roofing. On May 6, 2008, the Auditor General reported that the house was in poor condition and needed about $10 million in repairs and upgrades, which would require at least 12 to 15 months of "full access" to complete. In October 2015, Bryan Baeumler estimated $15 million might be necessary to properly renovate the residence. The NCC devised a plan for major renovations, asserting such a project would require approximately 18 months. In, 2021 the NCC released a new cost estimate of $36.6 million to bring the house to a state of good repair. However, the estimate includes a 370-square-metre (4,000 sq ft) expansion of the main building to improve universal accessibility, functionality, and livability.

As of 2023, the building was infested with rodents, and "the walls, attic and basement are filled with carcasses and excrement". In May 2023, work began to strip the property of asbestos and to remove "obsolete mechanical, heating, and electrical systems" which were the reasons that the building was deemed a fire hazard.

The idea of removing part of the structure and replacing it with a modern section had been floated. There have also been occasional calls to demolish the entire structure and rebuild, which would cost less than a renovation. Maureen McTeer, wife of former Prime Minister Joe Clark, said the building is "completely lacking" in architectural value and is not worth saving. The designation as a federal heritage building, though not legally binding, would probably protect it against such a measure. Heritage advocates have suggested retaining 24 Sussex Drive for public use due to its long history, noting that other countries have continually spent money to maintain their official residences in good condition for their respective head of governments, even if a new site for an official prime ministerial residence is selected. Former prime ministers Harper and Chrétien had offered to fundraise for the property's renovation.

The RCMP is concerned that the 24 Sussex address is too close to a busy road and lacks a buffer zone, so it has even been suggested that the prime minister's residence be moved to a new site that would have sufficient space for official functions, security, and staff.

Before Trudeau left office, he wrote a letter to Minister of Public Services and Procurement Jean-Yves Duclos to explore options for a new residence for the prime minister by January 2026. The letter contained three main proposals:

1. To replace or renovate the residence that exists on 24 Sussex Drive,
2. To move to another property in the Rockcliffe Park neighbourhood, or
3. To make upgrades to Rideau Cottage.

=== 2026 restoration plan ===
On June 26, 2026, Prime Minister Mark Carney announced a design-and-build competition for the "most ambitious, exciting, and affordable solutions" for the restoration of 24 Sussex Drive. A jury chaired by architect Moshe Safdie will recommend the winning proposal, which is expected to be announced by Canada Day 2027. The Rideau Hall Foundation is raising $50 million toward the cost of the project, while the federal government will pay for security-related costs.

Safdie, whom Carney personally asked to chair the jury, said in September 2026 that significant changes to the residence and its grounds were inevitable. He said the objective was "not a restoration of a historic building per se", but to create a site capable of serving several functions, including housing the prime minister and their family, providing ceremonial space and accommodating social functions. Safdie said that, at a minimum, a separate building would be required on the property to accommodate social events.

Safdie described the existing residence, which he toured after its interior had been gutted, as not architecturally significant in itself, while emphasizing its historical associations with Canadian prime ministers. He said the redesigned residence should become a "timeless design" reflecting its location overlooking the Ottawa River and its role in Canada's national identity.

The competition requires teams of architects, developers and builders to submit proposals under a design-build model, with each proposal including its projected cost. Safdie said price would be a factor in selecting the winning proposal but that the lowest-priced submission would not automatically be selected. He said involving the builder during the design process was intended to improve the project's prospects of being completed on time and within budget. Canadian materials and Indigenous participation are required for selection.

== Use ==
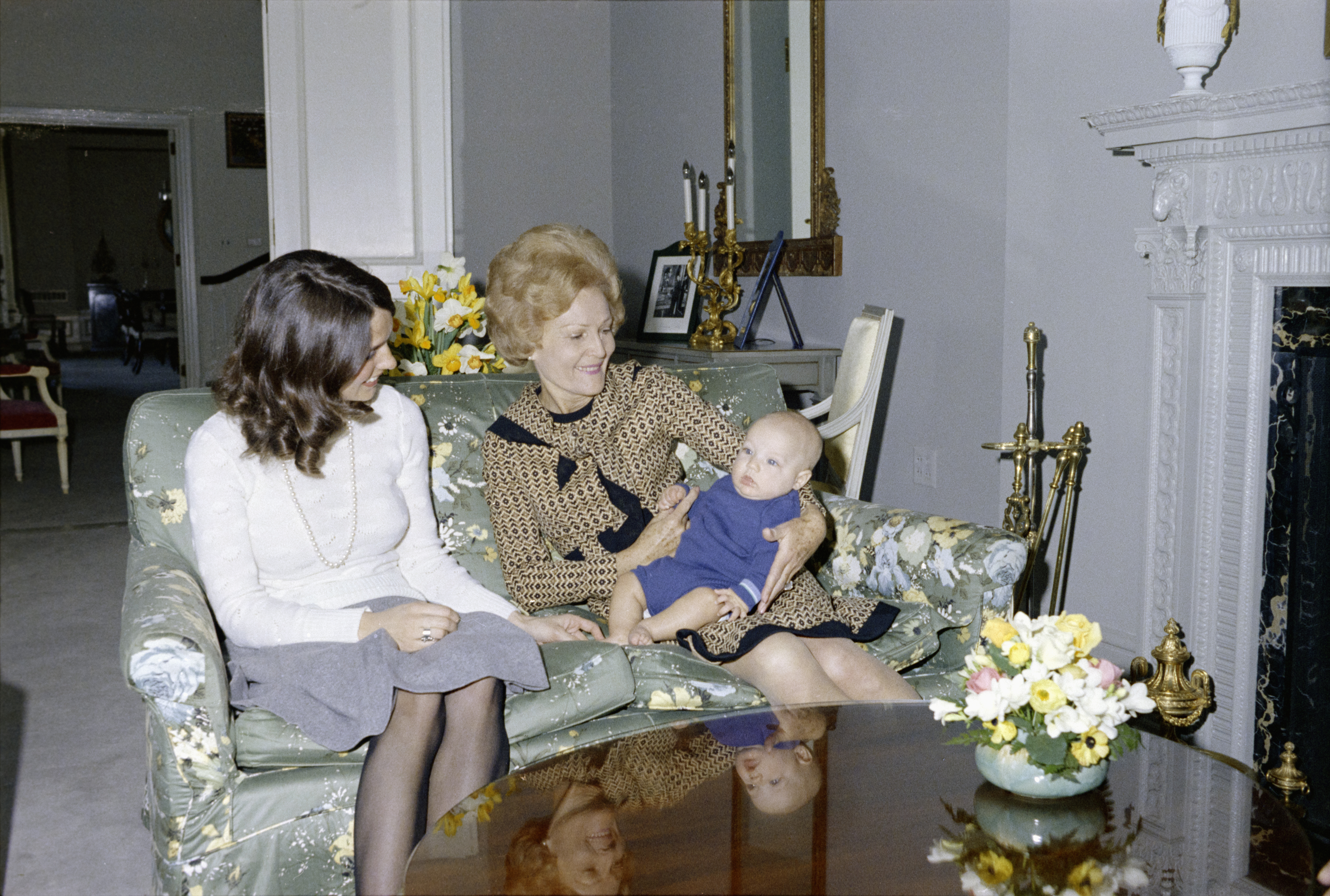
Margaret Trudeau, spouse of Pierre Trudeau, with Pat Nixon holding Justin Trudeau at 24 Sussex Drive, 1972

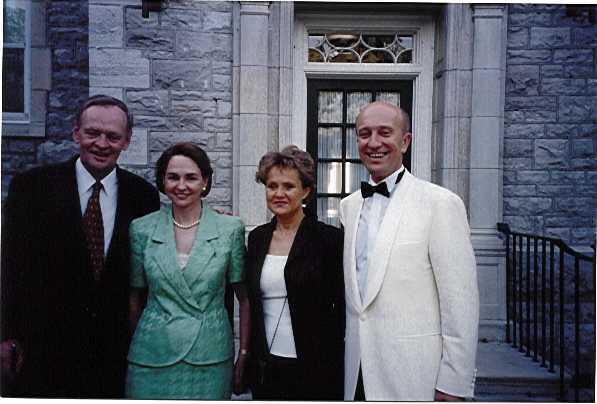
(Left to right) Prime Minister Jean Chrétien, his wife, Aline Chrétien, Marzena Skorek, and Adam Skorek outside the front entrance of 24 Sussex Dr, 19 June 1999

Unlike 10 Downing Street or the White House, 24 Sussex Drive has been used almost exclusively as a place of residence (and therefore its address has never been widely used as a metonym for the Office of the Prime Minister). The prime minister's work is carried out by the Office of the Prime Minister in the Office of the Prime Minister and Privy Council building, near Parliament Hill. However, prime ministers have conducted some work at 24 Sussex Drive over the years, and informal meetings between prime ministers and other government or foreign officials have taken place in the house (foreign heads of state on state visits are officially hosted by the monarch or governor general at Rideau Hall).

Despite the building not having any bureaucratic function, it has been the location of protests, such as when farmers drove their tractors in a convoy past the front of the property in 2006 and when Greenpeace activists chained themselves to the front gates in March 2007.

== Architecture ==
The residence at 24 Sussex Drive is a large, limestone-clad structure set on 1.6 hectares (4.0 acres) on the south bank of the Ottawa River, overlooking Governor Bay, next to the French embassy and opposite the main entrance to Rideau Hall. Prior to the upcoming renovations, the house consists of 35 rooms spread on four floors, including the basement, connected by an elevator and many staircases. The basement consists of support rooms, while the main floor holds the dining room, living room, kitchen (which is staffed by a head chef and support staff), main stair hall, prime minister's library, and a sun room. The second floor is primarily bedrooms, including the master bedroom, as well as a family room (described by Margaret Trudeau as her "freedom room") and the office of prime minister's spouse. The third floor contains additional bedrooms and a private study for the prime minister.

The exterior of the house is a mid-century modern take on Norman Revival architecture. When originally built, it was very much of the Victorian (Queen Anne) style; it had high gables, extensive verandahs, and a liberal use of gingerbread trim. A turret was added by the Edwards family in 1907. After it was decided in 1950 the house would become the official residence of the prime minister, the turret, widow's walk, trim, main gable at the front, verandahs, and porte-cochère were removed and an extension added to the east. The interior was gutted, save for part of the dining room.

The National Capital Commission (NCC) maintains the house, its property, and a selection of historic furnishings from the Crown Collection for use in the public rooms of the mansion, ranging from musical instruments to chairs, tables, and paintings by famous Canadians. However, due to the lack of restraints on the prime minister of the day to do what he or she pleases with the home, several have left their own marks on the building. For example, the rear patio was enclosed and winterized while Lester B. Pearson was prime minister and inside, Pearson's wife, Maryon, created in the basement the Canadiana Room, where she collected Canadian antiques and craft-work. While Joe Clark and his family were resident at 24 Sussex, the interiors were redecorated, the dining room ceiling receiving gold leaf re-purposed from another project. Unnamed business associates of Pierre Trudeau installed a swimming pool for his frequent workouts. The pool, designed by government architect Stig Harvor, reportedly cost $275,000 due to an underground access increasing the expense. This was raised in a "public fund" headed by Keith Davey, the donors to which were never made public. Brian Mulroney was the first prime minister to have the costs of renovations publicly revealed. The high tab for his and his wife's alterations to the building caused political controversy, especially as some of the costs were paid for from the PC Canada Fund, which raised money from individual donations to fund the Progressive Conservative Party.

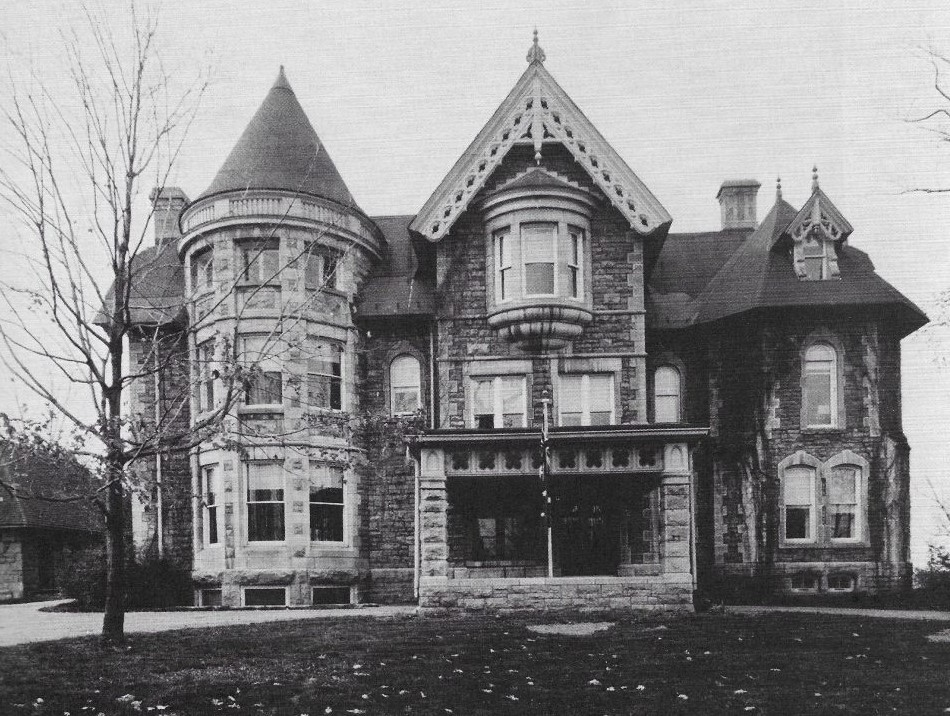
The front facade of 24 Sussex Drive before the renovations in 1950

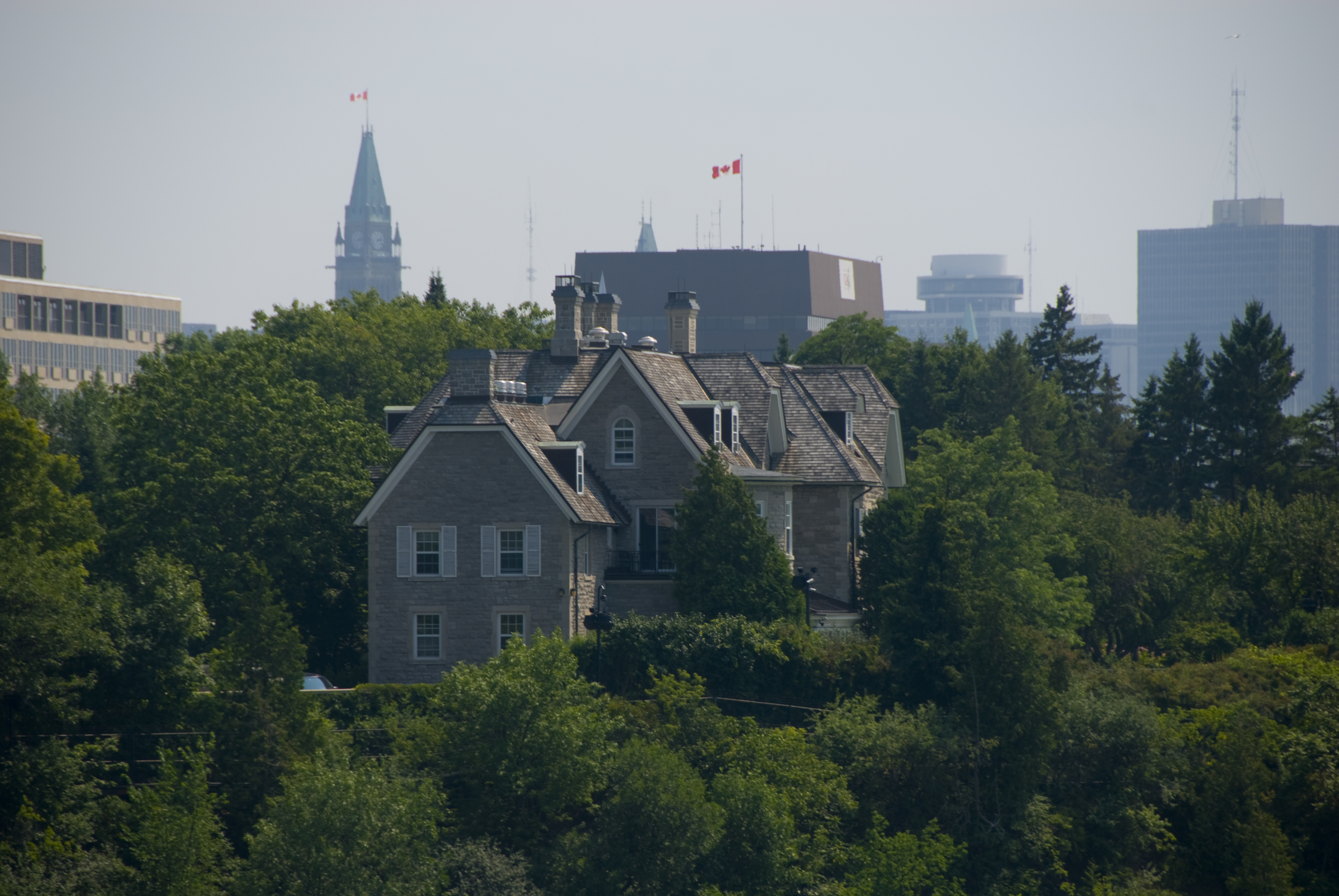
Rear of 24 Sussex Drive, facing the Ottawa River, 2005

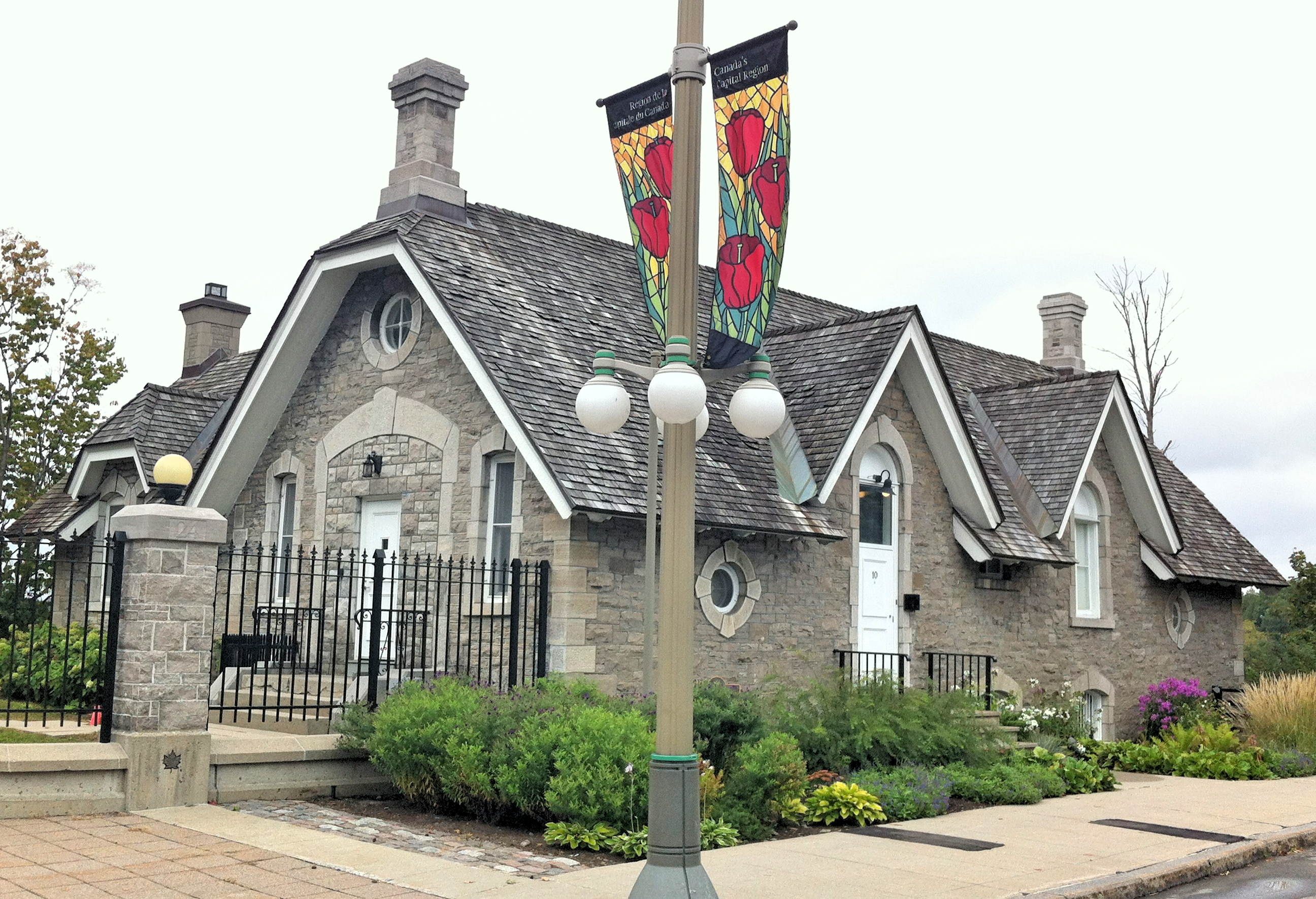
The gate and coach house, near the entrance to the property

== See also ==
- The Farm
- Stornoway
- Earnscliffe: residence of the British high commissioner to Canada, former home of Sir John A. Macdonald
