= Governor Bay =

Bay in Ontario, Canada

- Governor's Bay
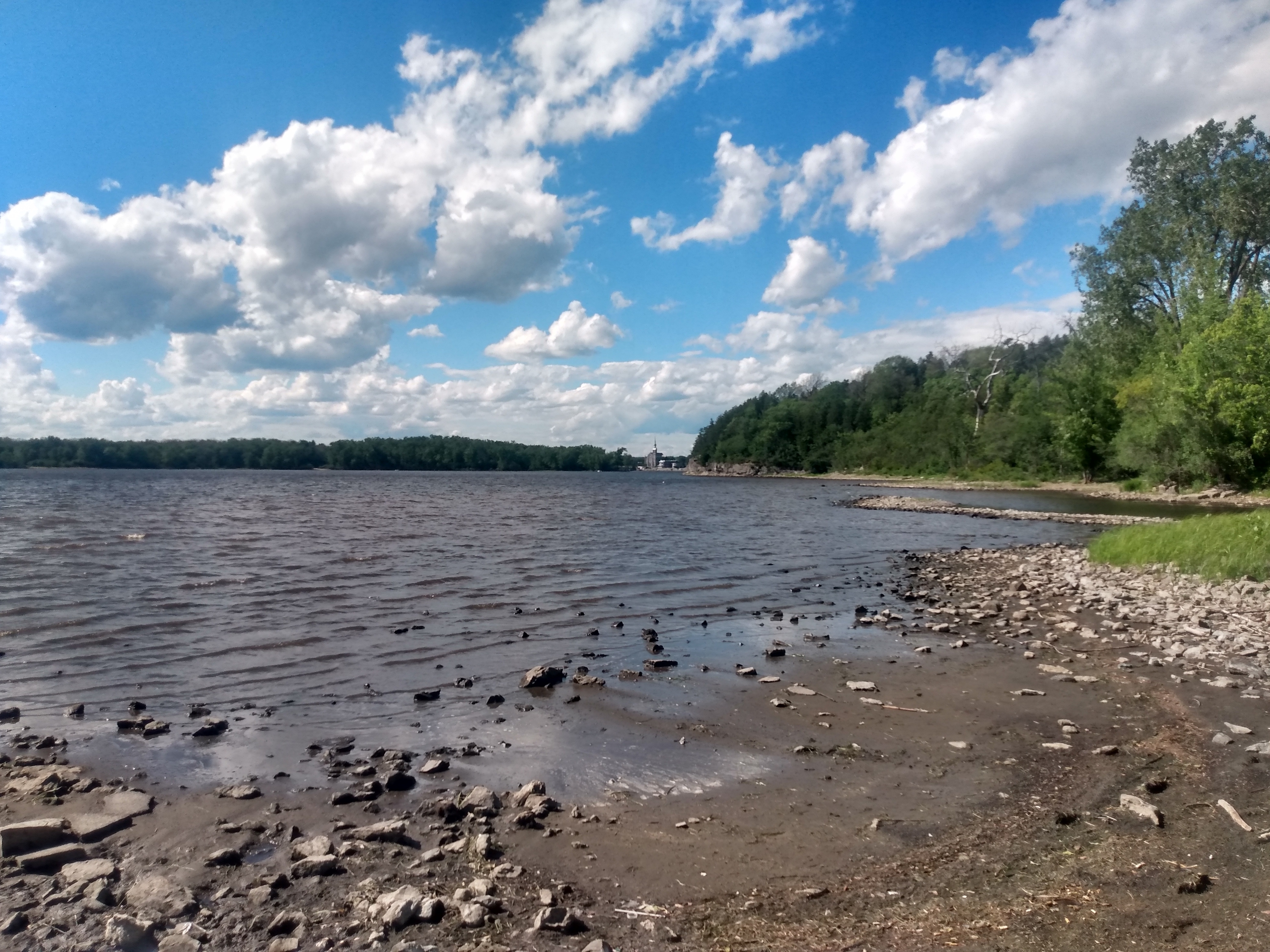

- Location in Ontario
- Location: Ottawa, Ontario, Canada
- Coordinates: 45°26′46″N 75°41′34″W
- Part of: Ottawa River
- Basin countries: Canada
- Max. length: 373 m (1,224 ft)
- Max. width: 225 m (738 ft)
- Surface elevation: 40 m (130 ft)

Governor Bay, better known historically as Governor's Bay is a bay in the Ottawa River in Ottawa, Ontario, Canada. It is roughly located between the neighbourhoods of New Edinburgh and Rockcliffe Park, below 24 Sussex, the official residence of the Prime Minister of Canada, and adjacent to Rideau Hall, the home of the Governor General of Canada.

== History ==
The bay was originally planned to be the beginning point of the Rideau Canal, but was rejected as the headland around the bay was too high and contained too much limestone to be removed. The Canals present location was chosen in 1826.

Governor Bay is believed to be home to the first non-Indigenous settlement in the Rockcliffe/New Edinburgh area, around 1830, on land rented from Thomas McKay by settlers Mr. Clements and Robert English.

In 1898, it was decided by Ottawa City Council's "Main Drainage Committee" that the bay would be the best place for a proposed sewage outlet. At around that time, the bay was used by the W. C. Edwards Company to store logs. The bay was also used to crib the logs into rafts. A stairway from Rockcliffe Park to the bay was built in 1900.

The bay was home to the Ottawa Canoe Club (today known as the Ottawa New Edinburgh Club) from 1894 to 1922.

When raw sewage was dumped directly into the Ottawa River, pollution in the bay was a large problem. "[O]ne of Ottawa's largest sewers (discharged) directly (into the bay)", as well as "refuse from all the sewers from Bronson Avenue downstream." A new sewer was constructed in 1971 with its outlet in to the bay.
