= Jean-Baptiste Thomas Caron =

Canadian politician

Jean-Baptiste Thomas Caron (November 16, 1869 – August 7, 1944) was a Canadian lawyer, judge and political figure in Ontario, Canada. He represented City of Ottawa in the House of Commons of Canada from 1907 to 1908 as a Liberal.

He was born in Garneau, Quebec, the son of Magloire Caron and Honorine Déchêne, and was educated at the Collège Bourget, the Université Laval and Osgoode Hall. Caron practised law in Ottawa. He was Licence Commissioner of Ottawa from 1904 to 1905. Caron was elected to the House of Commons in a 1907 by-election held after Napoléon Belcourt was named to the Senate. He ran unsuccessfully for a seat in the House of Commons in the Quebec riding of L'Islet in 1908. Caron served overseas as a captain in the Royal 22^{e} Régiment, also known as the "Van Doos". He served as judge for the Provisional Judicial District of Cochrane from 1923 to 1939. Caron died in Ottawa at the age of 74.
