= Joseph Tassé =

Canadian politician (1848–1895)

The Hon. Joseph Tassé
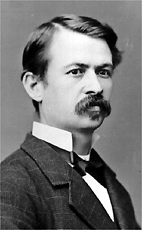

Member of the Canadian Parliament for Ottawa (City of) (electoral district)
- In office 1878–1887
- Preceded by: Pierre St. Jean
- Succeeded by: Charles Herbert Mackintosh

Senator for De Salaberry, Quebec
- In office 1891–1895
- Appointed by: John A. Macdonald
- Preceded by: François-Xavier-Anselme Trudel
- Succeeded by: Joseph-Octave Villeneuve

Personal details
- Born: 23 October 1848 L'Abord-à-Plouffe (Laval), Lower Canada
- Died: 17 January 1895 (aged 46) Montreal, Quebec
- Party: Conservative

Joseph Tassé (23 October 1848 – 17 January 1895) was a Canadian writer, translator, and parliamentarian.

Born in L'Abord-à-Plouffe Lower Canada (now part of modern Laval Quebec), Tassé as a young man studied the Classics at the Collège Bourget. Upon graduation he articled in law offices in Montreal, Plattsburgh, New York, and Ottawa. However, he never practised law, and instead pursued a career in journalism. From the 1860s, he was employed by newspapers such as Ottawa's Le Canada, and Montreal's La Minerve in 1868. Though he would eventually rise to become its editor, he was initially employed by La Minerve as a translator, a role he would revisit in 1872, when he became the official translator for the House of Commons of Canada. During this period, Tassé also became interested in the history of the Canadian West, and began to publish a series of articles on French-Canadian explorers of the west. This culminated in the 1878 publication of his two-volume work Les Canadiens de l'Ouest.

After six years as translator for the house, he resolved to himself enter politics. A Conservative, Tassé served was twice elected to serve as a member of parliament in the House of Commons of Canada, representing the Ontario electoral district of City of Ottawa. He was first elected in the Canadian federal election of 1878, and successfully defended this seat in 1882. However, in 1887 he stood for the Quebec riding of Laprairie and was defeated by only 23 votes, ending his career in the House. The loss undoubtedly arose from his support of the Conservative government's handling of the Red River Rebellion and the subsequent hanging of Louis Riel. On 9 February 1891 he was appointed to the Senate of Canada on the recommendation of Sir John A. Macdonald, and he served in the capacity representing the senatorial division of De Salaberry, Quebec until his death.

1887 Canadian federal election: La Prairie
| Party | Candidate | Votes |
|---|---|---|
| Independent Liberal | Cyrille Doyon | 917 |
| Conservative | Joseph Tassé | 894 |
