= Dominion Exhibition =

Annual exhibition in Canada

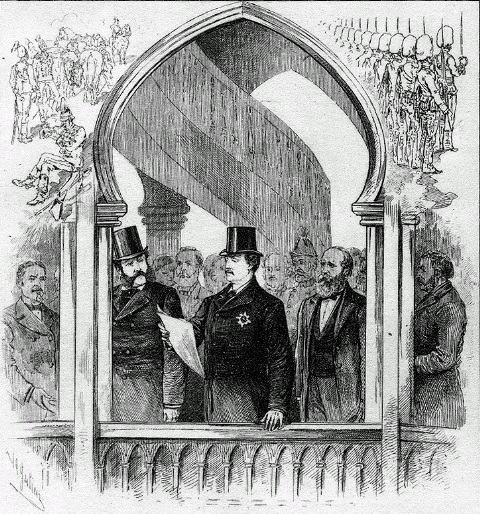
- Official Inauguration of the Dominion Exhibition in Montreal in 1880 by the Governor General, The Marquess of Lorne
- Genre: Exhibition
- Location: Various locations across Canada
- Years active: 34
- Founded: 1879

The Dominion Exhibition was an exhibition held annually in Canada from 1879 to 1913. Every year the federal government awarded the role of host of the exhibition to one of the country's larger fairs.

The first exhibition was held in Ottawa in 1879, and the final exhibition was held in Brandon, Manitoba in 1913. The outbreak of the First World War meant no designation was made in 1914, and the designation of a national exhibition was not revived after the war.

The "Dominion Exhibition Display Building II" in Brandon, a wooden building purpose-built for the 1913 exhibition, was designated a National Historic Site of Canada in 1999 as it is the only known surviving building constructed for the Dominion Exhibition.

== Exhibitions ==
- 1879 - Ottawa, Ontario
- 1880 - Montreal, Quebec
- 1881 - Halifax, Nova Scotia
- 1883 - Saint John, New Brunswick, held in commemoration of the 100th anniversary of the arrival of the Loyalists
- 1884 - Montreal, Quebec
- 1885 - London, Ontario
- 1903 - Toronto, Ontario
- 1904 - Winnipeg, Manitoba
- 1905 - New Westminster, British Columbia
- 1906 - Halifax, Nova Scotia
- 1907 - Sherbrooke, Quebec
- 1908 - Calgary, Alberta
- 1910 - Saint John, New Brunswick
- 1911 - Regina, Saskatchewan
- 1912 - Ottawa, Ontario
- 1913 - Brandon, Manitoba
