= Joseph Merrill Currier =

Canadian politician (1820–1884)

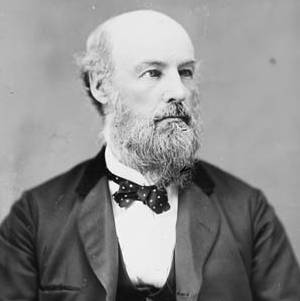
Joseph Merrill Currier Source: Library and Archives Canada

Joseph Merrill Currier (1820 – April 22, 1884) was a Canadian member of parliament and businessman.

== Early life and business ==
He was born in North Troy, Vermont in 1820 and moved to Canada in 1837, where he began work in the timber trade. In the late 1850s and early 1860s, he set up a sawmill and gristmill operation at Manotick, Ontario with Moss Kent Dickinson. He also operated his own lumber business in New Edinburgh from 1853 to the late 1860s and was a partner in the Wright, Batson and Currier Company with Alonzo Wright which operated a saw mill at Hull, Quebec. In 1868, Currier built a house at 24 Sussex Drive, for his third wife Hannah Wright (granddaughter of Philemon Wright), which is now used as the official residence for the Prime Minister of Canada. Currier named the house Gorffwysfa, Welsh for place of rest.

Currier became a member of the Ottawa City Council in the 1860s. In 1863, he was elected as a representative for Ottawa in the Legislative Assembly of the Province of Canada. He supported Confederation and continued to represent Ottawa in the Parliament of Canada until 1882. During that period, he was forced to resign on April 16, 1877, because his firms had done business with the government of Canada; he was re-elected in a by-election on May 9, 1877.

From 1872 to 1877, he was president of the Citizen Printing and Publishing Company which produced the Ottawa Daily Citizen. He also was president of two railway companies in the Ottawa area, the Ottawa and Gatineau Valley Railway and the Ontario and Quebec Railway. He was also connected with many other companies in the construction, banking and insurance industries. He began encountering financial problems in the 1870s and, in 1878, when the saw mill in Hull burned, he was bankrupt.

He was appointed postmaster of Ottawa in May 1882.

== Personal life ==
Currier had three wives: Christina Wilson whom he married in 1846 and who died in 1858; Ann Elizabeth Crosby; and Hannah Wright, daughter of Ruggles Wright, whom he married in 1868. He married his second wife in January 1861 and brought her to Manotick a month later. While viewing the machinery in the mill, Ann's dress became caught in a shaft and she was thrown against a wooden post. She died instantly from the impact to her head. Currier is said to have never visited Manotick again and he cut his ties to the business there in 1863, selling his shares of the mill to Dickinson. According to local legend, Ann's ghost continues to haunt Watson's Mill in Manotick.

== Death ==
He died in 1884 in New York City and is buried in Beechwood Cemetery.
