= Pierre St. Jean =

Canadian politician

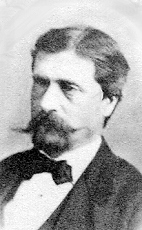
- Pierre St-Jean

14th Mayor of Ottawa
- In office 1882–1883
- Preceded by: Charles Herbert Mackintosh
- Succeeded by: Charles Thornton Bate

House of Commons of Canada
- Incumbent
- Assumed office 1874

Personal details
- Born: September 23, 1833 Bytown, Upper Canada
- Died: May 6, 1900 (aged 66) Ottawa, Ontario, Canada

Pierre St-Jean (September 23, 1833 – May 6, 1900) was a Canadian doctor and politician.

St-Jean was born in Bytown in 1833. During the 1840s, he established a French language literary society there with J.B. Turgeon. He studied medicine at McGill College in Montreal and received his licence to practice medicine in 1855. He worked for a while with another doctor in Ottawa and then practiced in Saint-Denis, Quebec. He married there but his wife died in childbirth in 1857 and he returned to Ottawa in 1858. He was one of only three Franco-Ontarian doctors in Ottawa at the time. He became part of the staff at the hospital operated by Élisabeth Bruyère`s Sisters of Charity, later the Ottawa General Hospital. He served four terms as president of the L'Institut canadien-français d'Ottawa.

In 1874, he became the first French-speaking member from Ontario in the House of Commons of Canada, representing Ottawa City. He was mayor of Ottawa from 1882 to 1883 being the first to have been born in it. During his term as mayor, the Canada Atlantic Railway link to Ottawa was completed.

Following his term as mayor, he remained on staff at the Ottawa General Hospital until 1898 and also worked at the Department of Public Works.

He died in Ottawa in 1900.
