= William H. Hutchison =

Canadian politician

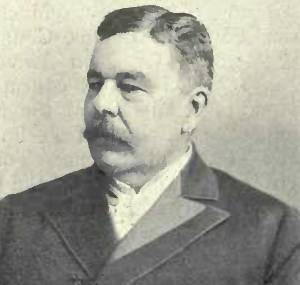
William H. Hutchison

William H. Hutchison (25 December 1843 – 17 June 1919) was a mill owner and political figure in Ontario, Canada. He represented the City of Ottawa in the House of Commons of Canada from 1896 to 1900 as a Liberal member.

Born in New Edinburgh, Hutchison was the son of Robert Hutchison, a Scottish immigrant who worked as a foreman for Thomas McKay, and Mary McKay, McKay's niece. He worked in flour mills in the United States before returning to Ottawa and going into business with his great-uncle. In 1874, Hutchison married Electa Blanche Willett. Hutchison served on Ottawa city council from 1885 to 1891 and was also chairman of the Board of Works for the city. He was a director of the Chaudiere Electric Light Company, the Ottawa City Passenger Railway Company, the Ottawa Electric Railway Company and the Ottawa Land Association. Hutchison also served as president of the Central Canada Exhibition. He died in Ottawa at the age of 76.
