= Napoléon Belcourt =

Canadian politician (1860–1932)

The Honourable Napoléon Antoine Belcourt PC KC
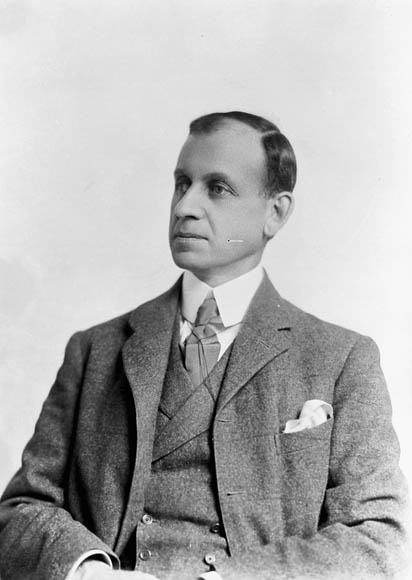

10th Speaker of the House of Commons of Canada
- In office March 10, 1904 – January 10, 1905
- Preceded by: Louis-Philippe Brodeur
- Succeeded by: Robert Franklin Sutherland

Member of Parliament for Ottawa (City of)
- In office 1896–1907
- Preceded by: William H. Hutchison
- Succeeded by: Thomas Birkett

Canadian Senator from Ontario
- In office 1907–1932
- Appointed by: Wilfrid Laurier

Personal details
- Born: September 15, 1860 Toronto, Canada West
- Died: August 7, 1932 (aged 71) Blue Sea Lake, Quebec, Canada
- Relations: Joseph Shehyn, Father-in-law
- Committees: Chair, Special Committee on Administration of the Canteen Fund and the Disablement Fund, and the Manufacture and Sale of Paper Poppies

Napoléon Antoine Belcourt, PC, KC (September 15, 1860 – August 7, 1932) was a Canadian parliamentarian.

== Biography ==
=== Early life ===
Belcourt was born in Toronto to French-Canadian parents, Ferdinand-Napoléon Belcourt and Marie-Anne Clair, and raised in Trois-Rivières, Quebec. He studied law at Université Laval, was called to the Quebec bar in 1882 and began his legal practice in Montreal in 1883 before moving to Ottawa in 1884. Belcourt was called to the Ontario bar in 1884. He joined the law faculty at the University of Ottawa in 1891, and became proprietor of the newspaper Le Temps which supported the Liberal Party of Wilfrid Laurier. Belcourt served as clerk of the peace and crown attorney for Carleton County from 1894 to 1896. In 1899, he was named Queen's Counsel.

He was married twice: to Hectorine, the daughter of Senator Joseph Shehyn, in 1889 and to Mary Margaret Haycock in 1903.

=== Career ===
He first ran for a seat in the House of Commons of Canada in the 1891 election but was defeated. He won a seat in the 1896 election, and used his position as a Member of Parliament (MP) to lobby in favour of the Franco-Ontarian community.

In 1904, he became Speaker of the House of Commons of Canada but only remained in that position for the rest of that Parliament's term. He stepped down following the 1904 election, but remained an MP.

In 1907, he was appointed to the Senate of Canada by Laurier.

Belcourt became a leader in the movement for French language Separate Schools in Ontario. He presided over the first Congress of Franco-Ontarians in 1910 called to oppose the Ontario government's attempts to suppress the use of the French language in schools. He was also a leader in the struggle against Regulation 17 which was implemented by the provincial government in June 1912 to limit the use of French as a language of instruction in both the public and separate school systems. Opposition culminated in demonstrations of several thousand people in Ottawa with Belcourt speaking on behalf of the protesters.

He unsuccessfully argued against Regulation 17 in Ontario's Supreme Court in 1914. He appealed all the way to the Judicial Committee of the Privy Council in Britain, where he argued that the Regulation violated the rights of French taxpayers to have their money used in accordance to their wishes, and that it deprived citizens the right to use their own language and decide upon their children's language of instruction. While Belcourt lost in court, the protest movement he led prevented the Regulation from being fully implemented.

In 1924, Belcourt was made Canada's Minister Plenipotentiary to the Interallied Conference in London and, the next year, he presided over the meeting of the Inter-Parliamentary Union in Ottawa.

He died at Blue Sea Lake in Quebec at the age of 71.

The Municipality of Belcourt in Quebec, Canada, was named after him.
