= Edgar-Rodolphe-Eugène Chevrier =

Canadian politician

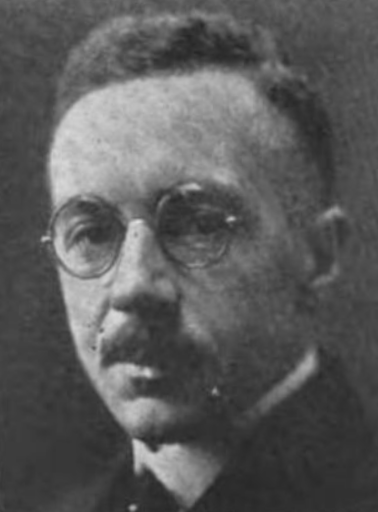

Member of the House of Commons of Canada
- In office 1935–1936
- Succeeded by: Joseph-Albert Pinard
- Constituency: Ottawa East

Member of the House of Commons of Canada
- In office 1921–1935
- Constituency: City of Ottawa

Personal details
- Born: October 5, 1887; Ottawa, Ontario
- Died: August 26, 1956 (aged 68); Blue Sea Lake, Quebec
- Resting place: Notre-Dame Cemetery
- Political party: Liberal
- Spouse: Juliette Nantel (m. 1918)
- Children: 3
- Education: University of Ottawa; Osgoode Hall
- Occupation: Jurist, politician

Edgar-Rodolphe-Eugène Chevrier (October 5, 1887 – August 26, 1956) was a Canadian lawyer, judge and political figure. He represented City of Ottawa in the House of Commons of Canada from 1921 to 1935 and Ottawa East from 1935 to 1936 as a Liberal member.

== Biography ==
He was born in Ottawa, Ontario in 1887, the son of Eugene Louis Chevrier and Delia St-Jacques. Chevrier was educated at the University of Ottawa and Osgoode Hall. He was called to the Ontario bar in 1912 and the Quebec bar in 1914. In 1914, he married Eugénie, the daughter of Charles Champagne. After the death of his first wife, Chevrier married Juliette Nantel in 1918. They had three daughters: Regine, Louise and Marie-Helene. He was named a King's Counsel in Quebec in 1928.

Chevrier resigned his seat in 1936 when he was named to the High Court of Justice division of the Supreme Court of Ontario. In 1953, he was named to the Court of Appeal for Ontario.

In his limited spare time, he was an active outdoorsman, who enjoyed hunting and fishing at his cottage on Lac Profond, near Gracefield, Quebec. The road he built to his cottage is named after him. He died near Blue Sea Lake in western Quebec in 1956, and was buried at Notre-Dame Cemetery. Juliette Nantel died in 1966.
