= Ottawa (City of) (electoral district) =

Former federal electoral district in Ontario, Canada

Ontario electoral district

Defunct federal electoral district
- Legislature: House of Commons
- District created: 1867
- District abolished: 1933
- First contested: 1867
- Last contested: 1930

Ottawa (City of) (French: Ottawa (Cité d')) was a federal electoral district in the province of Ontario, Canada, that was represented in the House of Commons of Canada from 1867 to 1935.

It was created by the British North America Act 1867. It consisted of the city of Ottawa. After 1872, two MPs represented this electoral district at any one time.

In 1892, it was redefined to exclude the New Edinburgh district of the city. In 1903, it was redefined as the city of Ottawa, excluding Rideau Ward. In 1914, it was redefined to exclude Hintonburgh (sic), Bayswater and Mechanicsville neighbourhoods as well as Rideau Ward. It continued to return two members.

In 1924, it was redefined as the city of Ottawa, excluding Rideau Ward and that part of the city lying west of a line beginning at the intersection of the Rideau Canal with the Canadian Pacific Railway in the south, and following the railway, Somerset Street, Bayswater Avenue, Bayview Road and Mason Street, to the Ottawa River.

The electoral district was abolished in 1933 when it was divided into Ottawa West and Ottawa East ridings.

== Members of Parliament ==
This riding has elected the following members of Parliament:

Parliament	Years	Member	Party	Member	Party
1st	1867–1872	Joseph Merrill Currier	Liberal–Conservative		
2nd	1872–1874	Joseph Merrill Currier	Liberal–Conservative	John Bower Lewis	Conservative
3rd	1874–1877	Joseph Merrill Currier	Liberal–Conservative	Pierre St. Jean	Liberal
3rd	1877–1878	Joseph Merrill Currier	Liberal–Conservative	Pierre St. Jean	Liberal
4th	1878–1882	Joseph Merrill Currier	Liberal–Conservative	Joseph Tassé	Conservative
5th	1882–1887	Charles H. Mackintosh	Conservative	Joseph Tassé	Conservative
6th	1887–1890	William Goodhue Perley†	Conservative	Honoré Robillard	Liberal–Conservative
6th	1890–1891	Charles H. Mackintosh	Conservative	Honoré Robillard	Liberal–Conservative
7th	1891–1893	Charles H. Mackintosh	Conservative	Honoré Robillard	Liberal–Conservative
7th	1893–1896	James Grant	Conservative	Honoré Robillard	Liberal–Conservative
8th	1896–1900	William H. Hutchison	Liberal	Napoléon Belcourt	Liberal
9th	1900–1904	Thomas Birkett	Conservative	Napoléon Belcourt	Liberal
10th	1904–1907	Robert Stewart	Liberal	Napoléon Belcourt	Liberal
10th	1907–1908	Robert Stewart	Liberal	Jean-Baptiste Thomas Caron	Liberal
11th	1908–1910	Wilfrid Laurier	Liberal	Harold McGiverin	Liberal
11th	1910–1911	Albert Allard	Liberal	Harold McGiverin	Liberal
12th	1911–1917	Alfred Ernest Fripp	Conservative	John Léo Chabot	Conservative
13th	1917–1921	Alfred Ernest Fripp	Government (Unionist)	John Léo Chabot	Government (Unionist)
14th	1921–1925	Harold McGiverin	Liberal	Edgar-Rodolphe-Eugène Chevrier	Liberal
15th	1925–1926	Stewart McClenaghan	Conservative	John Léo Chabot	Conservative
16th	1926–1930	Edgar-Rodolphe-Eugène Chevrier	Liberal	Gordon Cameron Edwards	Liberal
17th	1930–1935	Edgar-Rodolphe-Eugène Chevrier	Liberal	T. Franklin Ahearn	Liberal
Riding dissolved into Ottawa West and Ottawa East

== Election history ==
1867 Canadian federal election: Ottawa (City of)
Party	Candidate	Votes	%
Liberal-Conservative	Joseph Merrill Currier	974	96.92
Unknown	Alexander Gibb	25	2.49
Unknown	Edward McGillivray	5	0.50
Unknown	E. Martineau	1	0.10
Unknown	Moss Kent Dickinson	0	0.00
Unknown	Philip Thompson	0	0.00
Total valid votes		1,005	34.86
Eligible voters		2,883	
Source: 1867 Return of the Elections to House of Commons

Result by ward

Ward	Currier	McGillivray	Gibb	Martineau	Total vote	Eligible voters
By	270	0	9	1	280	746
Ottawa	256	1	1	0	258	656
Victoria	118	1	4	0	123	371
Wellington	147	2	4	0	153	536
St. George	183	1	7	0	181	574
Total	974	5	25	1	1,005	2,883

1872 Canadian federal election
Party	Candidate	Votes	Elected
Liberal-Conservative	Joseph Merrill Currier	acclaimed	x
Conservative	John Bower Lewis	acclaimed	x

1874 Canadian federal election
Party	Candidate	Votes	Elected
Liberal-Conservative	J. M. Currier	1,458	x
Liberal	St. Jean	1,213	x
Liberal-Conservative	Joseph Aumand	1,101	
Unknown	John Sweetland	8	

On Mr. Currier's resignation for having infringed the Independence of Parliament Act by conducting business dealings with the government while still a member:

By-election: 9 May 1877
Party	Candidate	Votes	Elected
Liberal-Conservative	Joseph Merrill Currier	2,035	x
Unknown	J. P. Featherston	772	

1878 Canadian federal election
Party	Candidate	Votes	Elected
Liberal-Conservative	Joseph Merrill Currier	1,854	x
Conservative	Joseph Tassé	1,748	x
Liberal	Pierre St. Jean	1,353	
Unknown	C. W. Bangs	1,239	

1882 Canadian federal election
Party	Candidate	Votes	Elected
Conservative	Charles H. Mackintosh	1,692	x
Conservative	Joseph Tassé	1,557	x
Liberal	A. F. McIntyre	1,229	
Liberal	P. St. Jean	1,213	

1887 Canadian federal election
Party	Candidate	Votes	Elected
Conservative	William Goodhue Perley	3,339	x
Liberal-Conservative	Honoré Robillard	3,207	x
Liberal	A. F. McIntyre	2,389	
Liberal	St. Jean	2,368	

On Mr. Perley's death:

By-election: 26 April 1890
Party	Candidate	Votes	Elected
Conservative	Charles H. Mackintosh	2,454	x
Equal Rights	Hay	1,596	
Liberal	Chrysler	1,242	

1891 Canadian federal election
Party	Candidate	Votes	Elected
Conservative	C. H. Mackintosh	3,029	x
Liberal-Conservative	Honoré Robillard	2,363	x
Liberal	N. A. Belcourt	1,946	
Liberal	J. W. Patterson	1,287	
Equal Rights	W. H. Lewis	770	
Liberal	R. Nagle	55	

On Mr. Mackintosh's resignation:

By-election: 7 December 1893
Party	Candidate	Votes	Elected
Conservative	James Alexander Grant	acclaimed	

1896 Canadian federal election
Party	Candidate	Votes	Elected
Liberal	W. Hutchinson	3,333	x
Liberal	N. A. Belcourt	2,942	x
Conservative	Hiram Robinson	2,751	
Conservative	N. Champagne	2,654	
Protestant Protective	Taylor McVeity	2,100	

1900 Canadian federal election
Party	Candidate	Votes	Elected
Conservative	Thomas Birkett	4,897	x
Liberal	N. A. Belcourt	4,524	x
Conservative	Napoléon Champagne	4,507	
Liberal	Robert Stewart	4,419	

1904 Canadian federal election
Party	Candidate	Votes	Elected
Liberal	N. A. Belcourt	6,275	x
Liberal	Robert Stewart	5,871	x
Conservative	Thomas Birkett	4,818	
Conservative	N. Champagne	4,547	

On Mr. Belcourt being called to the Senate:

By-election: 23 December 1907
Party	Candidate	Votes	Elected
Liberal	J. B. T. Caron	4,474	x
Unknown	W. D. Morris	1,145	

1908 Canadian federal election
Party	Candidate	Votes	%	Elected
Liberal	Wilfrid Laurier	6,584	26.53	✓
Liberal	Harold McGiverin	6,388	25.74	✓
Conservative	Thomas Birkett	5,959	24.01	
Conservative	John Léo Chabot	5,890	23.73	
Total valid votes		24,821	100.00	
Source(s) "Ottawa (City of), Ontario (1867-08-06 - 1935-08-13)". History of Federal Ridings Since 1867. Library of Parliament.

On Mr. Laurier's resignation:

By-election: 29 January 1910
Party	Candidate	Votes	Elected
Liberal	Albert Allard	5,779	x
Conservative	John Leo Chabot	5,121	

1911 Canadian federal election
Party	Candidate	Votes	Elected
Conservative	Alfred Ernest Fripp	7,062	✓
Conservative	John Leo Chabot	6,892	✓
Liberal	Harold Buchanan McGiverin	6,540	
Liberal	Joseph Albert Pinard	6,366	
Socialist	Allan Gordon McCallum	298	

1917 Canadian federal election
Party	Candidate	Votes	%	Elected
Government (Unionist)	Alfred Ernest Fripp	18,547	29.33	✓
Government (Unionist)	John Léo Chabot	18,312	28.96	✓
Opposition (Laurier Liberals)	Wilfrid Laurier	13,289	21.02	
Opposition (Laurier Liberals)	Harold McGiverin	13,077	20.68	
Total valid votes		63,225	100.00	
Source(s) "Ottawa (City of), Ontario (1867-08-06 - 1935-08-13)". History of Federal Ridings Since 1867. Library of Parliament.

1921 Canadian federal election
Party	Candidate	Votes	Elected
Liberal	Harold Buchanan McGiverin	22,087	x
Liberal	Edgar Rodolphe Eugène Chevrier	21,107	x
Conservative	Alfred Ernest Fripp	15,829	
Conservative	Napoléon Champagne	15,450	
Progressive	David Loughnan	5,302	
Progressive	Edmond Bourque	4,444	

1925 Canadian federal election
Party	Candidate	Votes	Elected
Conservative	Stewart McClenaghan	21,604	x
Conservative	John Léo Chabot	21,281	x
Liberal	Edgar Rodolphe Chevrier	19,725	
Liberal	Norman Frank Wilson	19,165	

1926 Canadian federal election
Party	Candidate	Votes	Elected
Liberal	Edgar Rodolphe Eugène Chevrier	23,012	x
Liberal	Gordon Cameron Edwards	22,950	x
Conservative	Stewart McClenaghan	21,917	
Conservative	Hon. John Léo Chabot	21,614	

1930 Canadian federal election
Party	Candidate	Votes	Elected
Liberal	Edgar Rodolphe Eugène Chevrier	25,721	x
Liberal	T. Frank Ahearn	25,632	x
Conservative	Frank Henry Plant	23,166	
Conservative	Frank Lafortune	22,579	

== See also ==
- List of Canadian electoral districts
- Historical federal electoral districts of Canada
