= Alfred Ernest Fripp =

Canadian politician

The Honourable Alfred Ernest Fripp KC
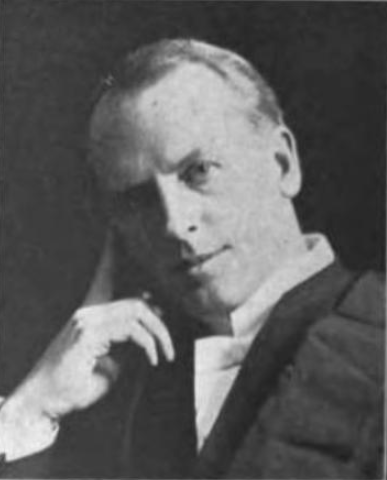

Canadian Senator from Ontario
- In office 1933–1938

Member of Parliament for Ottawa (City of)
- In office 1911–1921

Member of the Legislative Assembly of Ontario for Ottawa West
- In office 1908–1911

Personal details
- Born: June 29, 1866 Ottawa, Ontario, Canada
- Died: March 25, 1938 (aged 71) Ottawa, Ontario, Canada
- Party: Conservative

Alfred Ernest Fripp, KC (June 29, 1866 – March 25, 1938) was a Canadian lawyer and politician.

== Background ==
Born in Ottawa, Ontario, the son of Sidney Bowles Fripp, he was first elected to the House of Commons of Canada in the riding of Ottawa (City of) in the 1911 federal elections. A Conservative, he was re-elected in 1917 but was defeated in 1921. He was summoned to the Senate of Canada in 1933 representing the senatorial division of Ottawa, Ontario. He died in office in 1938, at his home in Ottawa.

In 1894, Fripp married Clementine Bell.
