= John Léo Chabot =

Canadian politician

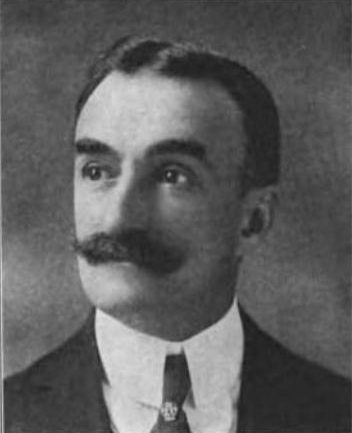

Member of the House of Commons of Canada
- In office 1911–1926
- Constituency: Ottawa

Personal details
- Born: February 23, 1869; Ottawa, Ontario
- Died: December 8, 1936 (aged 67); Ottawa, Ontario
- Political party: Conservative; Unionist
- Spouses: Mary Devlin (m. 1894) Hope Brunel (m. 1916)
- Education: University of Ottawa; McGill University
- Occupation: Surgeon, politician

John Léo Chabot, PC (February 23, 1869 – December 8, 1936) was a Canadian parliamentarian and surgeon.

== Biography ==
Born in Ottawa, Ontario, the son of Pierre-Hyacinthe Chabot and Margaret Ethier, he was educated at the University of Ottawa and McGill University and practised medicine in Ottawa.

Chabot was defeated in his attempt to win election as a Conservative from Ottawa in the 1908 federal election and again in a 1910 by-election. He was elected as one of two MPs in the multi-member constituency in 1911 and would serve until as Conservative and Unionist MP until his defeat in 1926.

Chabot was commander for the Ottawa General Military Base Hospital during World War I. He was also chief surgeon at the Ottawa General Hospital, surgeon for the Royal Canadian Mounted Police, surgeon for the Ottawa Police and physician for the University of Ottawa.

He was named to the Queen's Privy Council for Canada on July 19, 1926 on the recommendation of Prime Minister Arthur Meighen but was not named to Cabinet.

Chabot was married twice: to Mary Devlin in 1894 and to Hope Brunel in 1916. He died in Ottawa at the age of 67.
