= Harold McGiverin =

Canadian politician

The Hon. Harold McGiverin
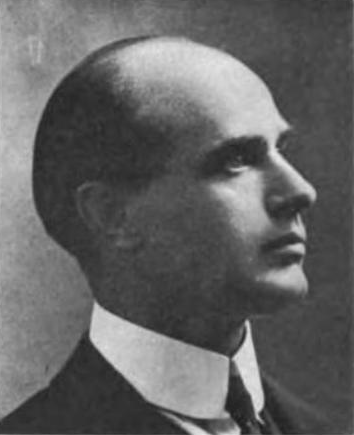

Member of the Canadian Parliament for City of Ottawa
- In office 1908–1911
- In office 1921–1925

Personal details
- Born: Harold Buchanan McGiverin; August 4, 1870 Hamilton, Ontario
- Died: February 4, 1931 (aged 60) Victoria, British Columbia
- Party: Liberal

Harold Buchanan McGiverin, PC (August 4, 1870 – February 4, 1931) was a Canadian lawyer and politician.

Born in Hamilton, Ontario, the son of Lieutenant Colonel William McGiverin and Emma Caroline McGiverin (Councell), he was educated in Hamilton, at Upper Canada College and at Osgoode Hall. Called to the Ontario bar in 1893, McGiverin practised law in Ottawa. He was also president of the Crow's Nest Pass Coal Company. He was elected to the House of Commons of Canada for the City of Ottawa riding in the 1908 federal election. A Liberal, he was defeated in the 1911 election and again in the 1917 election. He was re-elected in the 1921 election. From 1924 to 1925, he was a Minister without Portfolio.

In 1898, he married Alice Maude, the daughter of Charles H. Mackintosh. He is the father of Harold Mackintosh McGiverin.

McGiverin was also a leading local cricketer. A fast bowler, he represented Canada in eight matches before spending 1893 in England playing for St Neots Cricket Club as a professional. Following his retirement from playing McGiverin served as president of the Canadian Cricket Association. In 1908, he was the Canadian member on the Olympic Games Committee. McGiverin was also captain and later president of the Ottawa Rough Riders. He died in Victoria, British Columbia at the age of 60.

== Sources ==
- Adams, P. (2010) A history of Canadian cricket, lulu.com. ISBN 978-1-4466-9652-1.
