= New Edinburgh (disambiguation) =

New Edinburgh may refer to:

== Places ==
Canada

- New Edinburgh, Ontario
- New Edinburgh, Nova Scotia

New Zealand

- Dunedin, formerly known as New Edinburgh

Panama

- New Edinburgh, capital of Darien scheme, a former Scottish colony in modern-day Panama

United States

- New Edinburg, Arkansas, also spelled New Edinburgh

== Media ==
- New Edinburgh News, local newspaper of New Edinburgh, Ontario
- New Edinburgh Review, Scottish cultural magazine, founded in 1969 and retitled Edinburgh Review in 1984

== See also ==
- Dunedin (disambiguation)
- Edinburgh (disambiguation)
- New Town, Edinburgh, Scotland.
- Edinburgh Place, Hong Kong
- Edinburgh Square, Caledonia, Ontario, Canada
- Edinburg (disambiguation)
- Edinboro (disambiguation)
