= City of Edinburgh =

Edinburgh is the capital city of Scotland, a constituent country of the United Kingdom.

City of Edinburgh may also refer to:

- City of Edinburgh (council area), a unitary district established in 1996
  - City of Edinburgh Council, the local authority body in the city
- City of Edinburgh (1975–1996), a district of the Lothian region from 1975 to 1996
  - City of Edinburgh District Council (1975–1996), the local authority of the district
- City and royal burgh of Edinburgh (ca. 1130–1482), the initial area governed by the Edinburgh Corporation; see City of Edinburgh Council § History
- City and county of the city of Edinburgh (1482–1975)
- Edinburgh Corporation (ca. 1130–1975), the local authority body of the burgh of Edinburgh and the county of city of Edinburgh
- Edinburgh Town Council, a name used interchangeably with Edinburgh Corporation
- Edinburgh (settlement), the joined area of the localities: Edinburgh, Musselburgh and Wallyford; see List of towns and cities in Scotland by population § Settlements
- City of Edinburgh (ship), a number of ships named after the city of Edinburgh
- City of Edinburgh B.C., a basketball club
- City of Edinburgh Racing Club, a cycling club

== See also ==
- Edinburgh (disambiguation)
- Edinburgh City
