= Challaborough =

Village in south Devon, England

Coordinates: 50°17′24″N 3°53′42″W

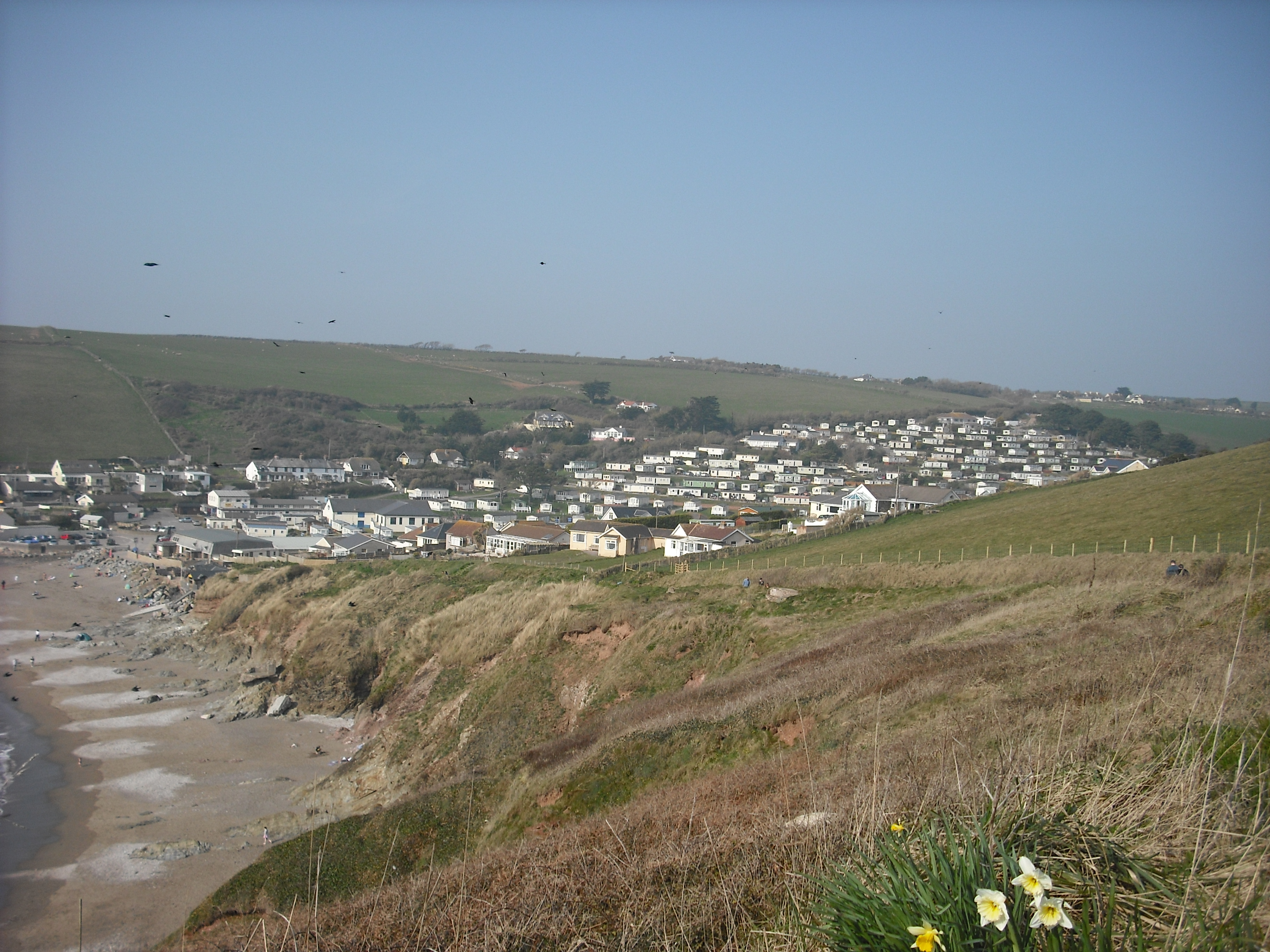
Challaborough

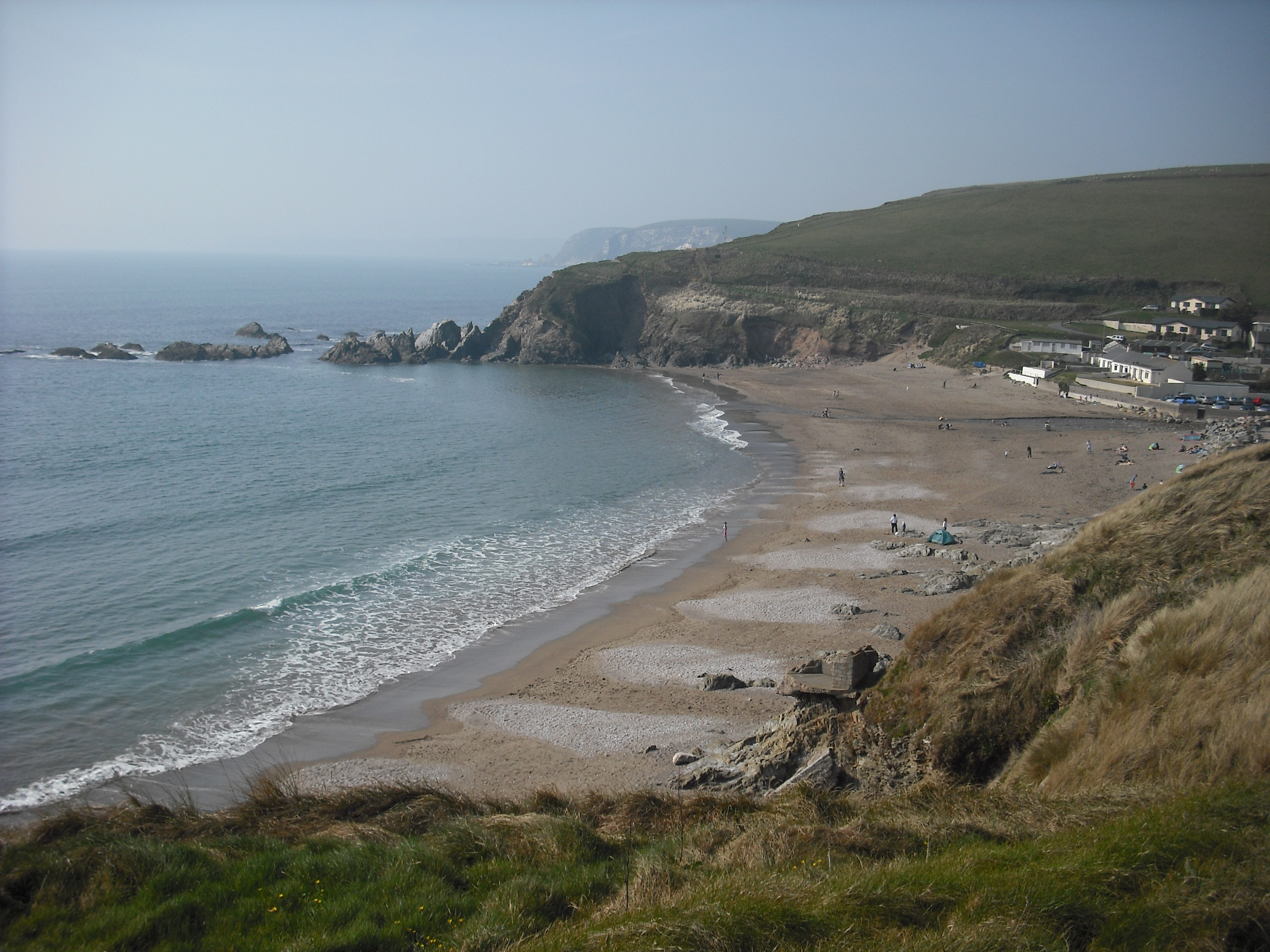
The beach

Challaborough is a village and popular surfing beach in the District of South Hams on the south coast of Devon, England. The village is in the parish of Ringmore, though the eastern part of the small bay and beach lies in Bigbury parish. The beach is popular with surfers from Plymouth and the surrounding area because of its powerful waves.

Challaborough village consists of two small static caravan sites (one of which is owned by Parkdean Resorts) and some private houses. Most properties have views of Burgh Island and Bigbury Bay. The beach is popular with surfers and holidaymakers. It is a horseshoe shaped bay with a sand bar protecting the entrance. The beach is divided by a small stream that runs from the valley down into the sea that forms the boundary between the parishes of Ringmore and Bigbury.

For boats there are two slipways. One is privately owned by one of the caravan sites and is better maintained, although rather steep. Members of the public have to pay to use the private slipway, but the public slipway, which is only suitable for smaller boats, is free for all to use. Challaborough is popular with the diving community as there are several wrecks along the nearby coastline. Fishing is also good in the area as well as sailing and cruising.

Although Challaborough is part of two civil parishes, Bigbury and Ringmore, and therefore does not have its own council, there is a local action group that aims to protect community interests.

There are many footpaths as well as the coastal footpath. To the east is the more developed resort of Bigbury-on-Sea and Burgh Island. In the other direction along the coast are a number of coves, Ayrmer Cove and Westcombe (pronounced Wis-com); although more challenging to walk to are far quieter and picturesque. A little further west is the mouth and estuary of the River Erme.

The static caravans at Challaborough are mostly privately owned, but there are some hire fleet caravans. Facilities on the lower site include a nightclub, arcade, swimming pool, bar, shop, launderette and child's play facilities. The upper site generally enjoys better views but has fewer facilities and is situated on a steep hill. Disabled access around the lower site and the beach is usually very good; in the winter the sand sometimes shifts below the level of the disabled beach access.

Dogs are banned from the beach during the summer months. RNLI lifeguards patrol during the summer months.
