= Ringmore =

Village in Devon, England

Coordinates: 50.298°N 3.894°W

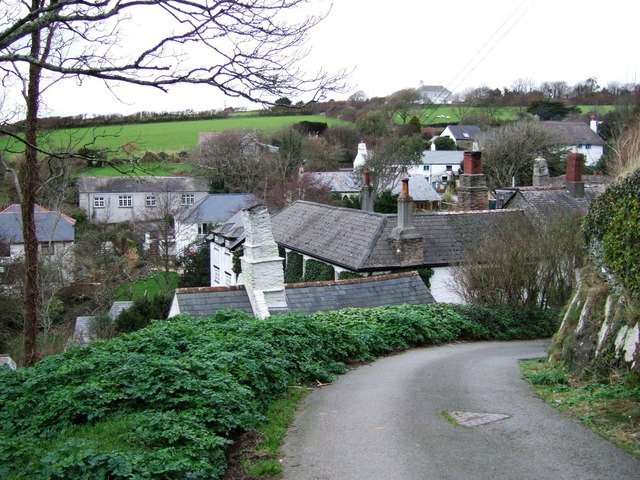
- The village of Ringmore

- Location within Devon
- Population: 208 (2011 census)
- Civil parish: Ringmore
- District: South Hams
- Shire county: Devon
- Region: South West
- Country: England
- Sovereign state: United Kingdom

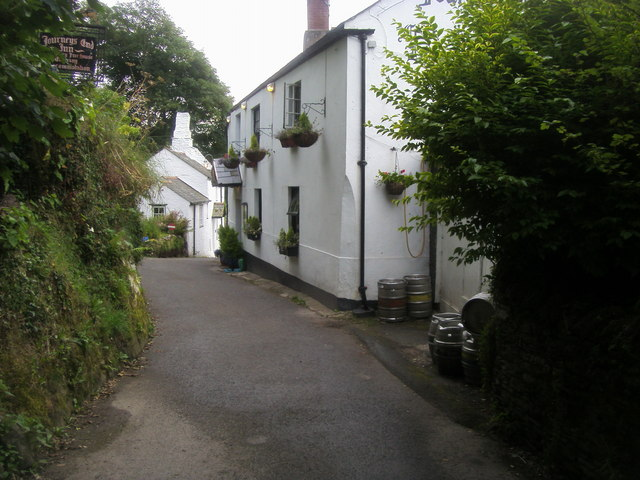
The Journey's End inn

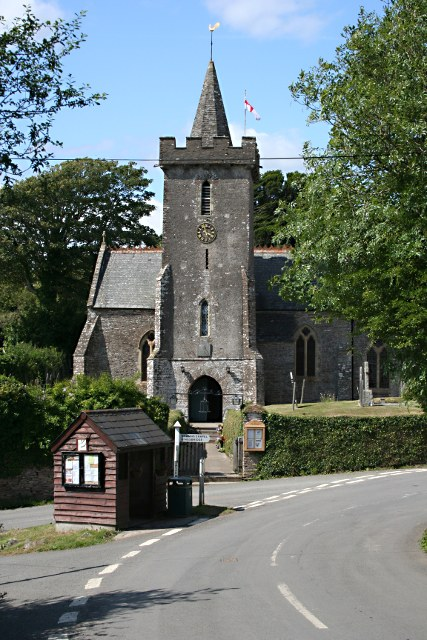
Parish Church of All Hallows

Ringmore is a village and civil parish in the South Hams district, on the coast of Devon, England. The population taken at the 2011 census was 208.

== History ==
The earliest surviving record of Ringmore is in the Domesday Book, in which it is referred to as "Reimore". Until 1908, there was a manor (or estate) in Ringmore. Due to the absence of a lord in the manor, there are no official written records of the past of the village.

The small sandy bay on the coast was once Ringmore's "port". From here boats went fishing for pilchards and to rescue seafarers wrecked on the rocks near Burgh Island.

== Description ==
Ringmore is a village on the coast of Devon, England, at the head of a valley. From the village one can see Bigbury Bay and Aymore Cove. Within it are two 13th-century buildings, namely its Church of All Hallows and The Journey's End inn, previously known as The New Inn. The church of All Hallows is early English in style (13th-century); the tower with its spire is also of that date and stands to the south of the nave. The nave, chancel and two transepts have plain lancets without any tracery. Some of the windows have been renewed.

The parish of Ringmore covers 1,128 acres (456 ha) and includes at its southern boundary the shoreline hamlet of Challaborough and, to the north, a group of houses at Marwell. Most of its land is owned by the National Trust, and a large part of the village is designated as a Conservation Area. By common consent there is no street lighting and there is, from 2017, a mobile phone mast near the village, near St Anne's Chapel.

== Location ==
Ringmore is between Kingston to the west and Bigbury to the east. On the south it borders the sea.
