= List of shipwrecks in October 1820 =

The list of shipwrecks in October 1820 includes ships sunk, wrecked or otherwise lost during October 1820.

== 1 October ==
List of shipwrecks: 1 October 1820
Ship	State	Description
Ann	United Kingdom	The ship ran aground on the Andrews Bank, in the North Sea off the coast of Essex. She was on a voyage from Harwich, Essex to London.
Anne	United Kingdom	The ship was wrecked on Penmon Point, Anglesey. Her crew were rescued. She was on a voyage from Liverpool, Lancashire to Caernarfon.
Fly	United Kingdom	The ship was wrecked on Penmon Point. Her crew were rescued. She was on a voyage from Liverpool to Caernarfon.
Sincerity	United Kingdom	The ship was wrecked on Penmon Point. Her crew were rescued. She was on a voyage from Chester, Cheshire to Caernarfon.
William	United Kingdom	The ship was wrecked in the Abaco Islands. Her crew survived. She was on a voyage from Liverpool, Lancashire to New Orleans, Louisiana.

== 2 October ==
List of shipwrecks: 2 October 1820
Ship	State	Description
Policy	United Kingdom	The whaler was driven ashore at Margate, Kent. She was on a voyage from London to the South Seas. Policy was refloated on 3 October and put back to the River Thames on 5 October.

== 3 October ==
List of shipwrecks: 3 October 1820
Ship	State	Description
Fame	United Kingdom	The ship was lost on the Oreground, in the Gulf of Bothnia. Her crew were rescued. She was on a voyage from Sundsvall, Sweden to Hull, Yorkshire.
Leander	United Kingdom	The ship was driven ashore at Odesa. She was on a voyage from Odesa to Liverpool, Lancashire. Leander was refloated on 6 October.

== 4 October ==
List of shipwrecks: 4 October 1820
Ship	State	Description
Charlotte	Sweden	The ship was lost near Varberg. Her crew were rescued. She was on a voyage from Stockholm to Rotterdam, South Holland, Netherlands.

== 5 October ==
List of shipwrecks: 5 October 1820
Ship	State	Description
Elizabeth and Jean	Netherlands	The ship was lost near Mahón, Spain. She was on a voyage from Rotterdam, South Holland to Genoa, Grand Duchy of Tuscany.
Idea	United Kingdom	The schooner foundered in the English Channel off Helford, Cornwall with the loss of three of her four crew. The survivor was rescued by HMRC Hind ( Board of Customs). Idea was on a voyage from Plymouth, Devon to Falmouth, Cornwall.

== 6 October ==
List of shipwrecks: 6 October 1820
Ship	State	Description
Ida	United Kingdom	The ship foundered off Helford, Cornwall with the loss of three of her four crew. She was on a voyage from Plymouth, Devon to Padstow, Cornwall.
St. Pierre	France	The ship was driven ashore and severely damaged at Calais. She was on a voyage from Calais to Cette, Hérault.
Trident	United Kingdom	The ship was driven ashore at Newcastle upon Tyne, Northumberland. She was refloated but found to have hogged.

== 8 October ==
List of shipwrecks: 8 October 1820
Ship	State	Description
Hillma	Netherlands	The ship was driven ashore near "Leerham", Sweden.

== 9 October ==
List of shipwrecks: 9 October 1820
Ship	State	Description
Oscar	United Kingdom	The ship struck the Haisborough Sands and consequently foundered. Her crew were rescued. She was on a voyage from Bergen, Norway to Barcelona, Spain.
Wylam	United Kingdom	The ship departed from Rio de Janeiro, United Kingdom of Portugal, Brazil and the Algarves for London. No further trace, presumed foundered with the loss of all hands.

== 10 October ==
List of shipwrecks: 10 October 1820
Ship	State	Description
Henry Addington	United Kingdom	The ship was driven ashore at Pillau, Prussia. Her crew were rescued by the Pillau Lifeboat. She was on a voyage from Newcastle upon Tyne, Northumberland to Pillau.

== 13 October ==
List of shipwrecks: 13 October 1820
Ship	State	Description
Integrity	United Kingdom	The ship was driven ashore on Læsø, Denmark. She was refloated but was abandoned the next day in a sinking condition. Her crew were rescued by Friends (United Kingdom). She was on a voyage from Libava, Courland Governorate to London.

== 14 October ==
List of shipwrecks: 14 October 1820
Ship	State	Description
Twins	United Kingdom	The ship foundered in the Irish Sea off Strumble Head, Pembrokeshire. Her crew were rescued. She was on a voyage from Aberystwyth, Cardiganshire to Neath, Glamorgan.
Union	United Kingdom	The ship foundered in the Irish Sea off Cardigan Head. Her crew were rescued. She was on a voyage from Aberystwyth to Neath.

== 15 October ==
List of shipwrecks: 15 October 1820
Ship	State	Description
Wohlfarth	Stettin	The ship was driven ashore on Gotaland, Sweden. She was on a voyage from Stettin to Saint Petersburg, Russia. Wohlfarth was later refloated and taken in to Östergarn.

== 16 October ==
List of shipwrecks: 16 October 1820
Ship	State	Description
Catherine	United Kingdom	The ship was driven ashore in the Isles of Scilly. She was on a voyage from Cork to Plymouth, Devon. Catherine was later refloated.
City of Edinburgh	United Kingdom	The ship was driven ashore and sank in the Isles of Scilly. She was on a voyage from Saint John, New Brunswick, British North America to London. She was refloated on 19 October and taken in to St. Mary's, Isles of Scilly for repairs.
Conjunction	Sweden	The ship was lost on Læsø, Denmark. She was on a voyage from Stockholm to Calais, France.
Elizabeth and Sally	United Kingdom	The ship was lost in Bantry Bay. She was on a voyage from Tralee, County Kerry to Liverpool, Lancashire.
Venus	France	The ship was driven ashore near the Old Head of Kinsale, County Cork, United Kingdom with the loss of a crew member.

== 17 October ==
List of shipwrecks: 17 October 1820
Ship	State	Description
Acorn	United Kingdom	The ship was driven ashore on the Barrow of Ballyteague, County Galway. Her crew were rescued.
Amity	United Kingdom	The ship sank at Ramsgate, Kent. She was on a voyage from Sunderland, County Durham to Sandwich, Kent.
Brothers	United Kingdom	The ship was driven ashore and wrecked at Littlehampton, Sussex.
Dadales	United Kingdom	The ship was driven ashore at Aberdeen. She was refloated the next day.
Lark	United Kingdom	The packet boat was driven ashore at Calais, France. All on board survived. She was on a voyage from Dover, Kent to Calais. Lark was refloated on 21 October.
Ourang Outang	France	The ship was wrecked at Calais. She was on a voyage from Bordeaux, Gironde to Calais.
Pollux	United Kingdom	The ship was driven ashore near Weymouth, Dorset with the loss of a crew member. She was on a voyage from Cork to London.
Unge Johannes	Norway	The ship was driven ashore and sank in the Cattewater. Her crew were rescued. She was on a voyage from Terravecchia, Kingdom of the Two Sicilies to Trondheim.
William	United Kingdom	The brig foundered whilst on a voyage from Cork to Glasgow, Renfrewshire.

== 18 October ==
List of shipwrecks: 18 October 1820
Ship	State	Description
Amity	United Kingdom	The ship was driven ashore at Bangor, County Down. She was on a voyage from Belfast, County Antrim to Liverpool, Lancashire.
Josina	United Kingdom	The ship was driven ashore near Ballina, County Mayo.
Mary	United Kingdom	The ship was driven ashore at Bangor. She was on a voyage from Chester, Cheshire to Londonderry.
Star	United Kingdom	The ship was driven ashore and sank near Winterton-on-Sea, Norfolk. She was on a voyage from Bordeaux, Gironde, France to Hull, Yorkshire.
St. Peter	Russia	The ship was driven ashore near Southport, Lancashire. She was on a voyage from Liverpool to Loviisa, Grand Duchy of Finland.
Venus	(United Kingdom of Great Britain and Ireland) Jersey	The brig was wrecked at the Old Head of Kinsale, County Cork with the loss of a crew member.

== 19 October ==
List of shipwrecks: 19 October 1820
Ship	State	Description
Halifax Packet	United Kingdom	The ship departed from Londonderry for New York, United States. No further trace, presumed foundered with the loss of all hands.
John Crawford	United Kingdom	The ship ran aground and was damaged on the Black Rock, in the Clyde. She was on a voyage from Málaga, Spain to Greenock, Renfrewshire. John Crawford was later refloated and taken in to Greenock.
Lark	United Kingdom	The ship was driven ashore and wrecked at Calais, France. All on board were rescued. She was on a voyage from Dover, Kent to Calais.

== 20 October ==
List of shipwrecks: 20 October 1820
Ship	State	Description
Fame	United Kingdom	The ship departed from Great Yarmouth, Norfolk for Grangemouth, Stirlingshire. No further trace, presumed foundered in the North Sea with the loss of all hands.
Leicester	United Kingdom	The ship was wrecked at Aveiro, Portugal. She was on a voyage from Jersey, Channel Islands to Buenos Aires, Argentina.
Messagere	France	The ship was driven ashore in the Seine. She was on a voyage from Cherbourg to Havre de Grâce, Seine-Inférieure.
St. Peter	United Kingdom	The ship foundered in the Irish Sea off Southport, Lancashire.

== 21 October ==
List of shipwrecks: 21 October 1820
Ship	State	Description
Ellen or Helen	United Kingdom	The ship was driven ashore and wrecked at Selsey Bill, Sussex. Seven crew were rescued by Bonne Foi (France).
Fly	United Kingdom	The cutter was driven ashore at Livorno, Grand Duchy of Tuscany.
Gipsey	United States	The ship was driven ashore at Livorno.
Helena	Russia	The ship was wrecked in the Aspö Islands. She was on a voyage from Saint Petersburg to Hull, Yorkshire, United Kingdom.
John Crawford	United Kingdom	The schooner was wrecked at Black Rock Point, Renfrewshire She was on a voyage from Málaga, Spain to Greenock, Renfrewshire.
Laura	Prussia	The ship was lost near Frederikshavn, Denmark. Her crew were rescued. She was on a voyage from Königsberg to Amsterdam, North Holland, Netherlands.
Messagère	France	The ship ran aground and was severely damaged at Havre de Grâce, Seine-Inférieure. She was refloated and beached in the Seine. Messagère was on a voyage from Louisiana to Cherbourg, Seine-Inférieure.
Providence	United Kingdom	The ship was driven ashore near Lymington, Hampshire. She was on a voyage from Waterford to Southampton, Hampshire. Providence was refloated the next day and taken in to Lymington.
Young Lars	Denmark	The ship was lost on Læsø. She was on a voyage from Jersey, Channel Islands to Copenhagen.

== 22 October ==
List of shipwrecks: 22 October 1820
Ship	State	Description
Abartouri	Sweden	The ship was driven ashore and wrecked at Ramsgate, Kent, United Kingdom with some loss of life.
Alderney	(United Kingdom of Great Britain and Ireland) Guernsey	The sloop was wrecked on Alderney, Channel Islands with the loss of all hands. She was on a voyage from Dartmouth, Devon to Guernsey.
Ann	United Kingdom	The ship was driven ashore at Felixstowe, Suffolk. Her crew were rescued. She was on a voyage from South Shields, County Durham to Maldon, Essex.
Arab	United Kingdom	The whaler was driven ashore at Margate, Kent. She was later refloated.
Borneo	United Kingdom	Borneo ashore at Southsea. The ship was driven ashore at Southsea, Hampshire. She was refloated on 25 October and put into Liverpool for repairs.
Boyne	United Kingdom	The ship was wrecked on the Gunfleet Sand, in the North Sea off Harwich, Essex. Her crew were rescued. She was on a voyage from Newcastle upon Tyne, Northumberland to London.
Charlotte	United Kingdom	The ship foundered in the English Channel off Dungeness, Kent with the loss of all hands.
Christopher	United Kingdom	The ship was driven ashore at Poole, Dorset.
Churchill	United Kingdom	The ship was driven ashore at Padstow, Cornwall. She was on a voyage from Palermo, Sicily to Liverpool, Lancashire. Churchill was refloated on 2 December.
Commodore	United Kingdom	The schooner was driven ashore and wrecked in Bigbury Bay. Her crew were rescued.
Curlew	United Kingdom	The Collier was wrecked on the Gunfleet Sand, in the North Sea off Harwich. Her crew survived.
Duke of York	United Kingdom	The ship was wrecked on the Kentish Knock, in the North Sea off Margate. She was on a voyage from Littlehampton, Sussex to South Shields, County Durham.
Edward Hendrick	Prussia	The ship was driven ashore and wrecked near Ramsgate. She was on a voyage from Barth to Lisbon, Portugal.
Ellen	United Kingdom	The ship was driven ashore and wrecked on Selsey Bill, Sussex with the loss of all hands.
Esperance	France	The ship was driven ashore at Ramsgate. She was on a voyage from La Rochelle, Charente-Maritime to Calais. Esperance was later refloated and taken in to Ramsgate.
George	United Kingdom	The ship foundered in the North Sea off Lowestoft, suffolk Her crew were rescued by the Lowestoft Lifeboat.
Herald	United Kingdom	The ship was wrecked at Great Yarmouth, Norfolk. She was on a voyage from Sunderland, County Durham to Deal, Kent.
Kite	United Kingdom	The ship sank at Ramsgate, Kent. She was on a voyage from South Shields to Dover.
Mary	United Kingdom	The collier was wrecked on the Gunfleet Sand, in the North Sea off Harwich. Her crew survived.
Nantaise	France	The ship was driven ashore near Le Croisic, Loire-Inférieure. She was on a voyage from Martinique to Nantes, Loire-Inférieure.
Ocean	United Kingdom	The sloop was driven ashore at Ramsgate.
Providence	United Kingdom	The ship ran aground on the Tongue Sand. She was on a voyage from Ceylon to Mauritius and London. Providence was later refloated.
Recovery	United Kingdom	The ship was driven ashore and wrecked between Dymchurch and New Romney, Kent. Her crew were rescued. She was on a voyage from Portland, Dorset to London.
Robert	United Kingdom	The ship was wrecked on the Tongue Sand, in the North Sea off Margate, Kent. Her crew survived.
Royal Oak	United Kingdom	The ship was driven ashore at Harwich. She had been refloated by 24 October.
Sally	United Kingdom	The ship was wrecked at Smerwick, County Kerry with the loss of eleven of the twelve people on board. She was on a voyage from Trinidad to Hull, Yorkshire. She was refloated on 4 November and taken in to Margate.
Sally	United Kingdom	The ship was driven ashore at Margate. Her crew were rescued. Sally was refloated on 4 November and taken in to Margate.
Sarah and Caroline	United Kingdom	The ship was wrecked on the Newcombe Sand, in the North Sea off Lowestoft. Her crew were rescued by the Lowestoft Lifeboat.
Trim	United Kingdom	The ship was lost in Galway Bay.
Unity	United Kingdom	The ship was driven ashore at Ramsgate. She was on a voyage from Hamburg to Faial Island, Azores. Unity was later refloated and taken in to Ramsgate.
Waterloo	United Kingdom	The ship was wrecked in the Atlantic Ocean with the loss of four of the twenty people on board. The survivors were rescued on 29 October by Merchant (United Kingdom). She was on a voyage from St. John's, Newfoundland, British North America to Liverpool.
Xania	United Kingdom	The sloop was driven ashore at Ramsgate. She was on a voyage from Belfast, County Antrim to London. Xania was later refloated and taken in to Ramsgate.

== 23 October ==
List of shipwrecks: 23 October 1820
Ship	State	Description
Amelia	United Kingdom	The ship was driven ashore and wrecked near Fowey, Cornwall. Her crew were rescued. She was on a voyage from Fowey to Plymouth, Devon.
John	United Kingdom	The schooner was driven ashore and wrecked near Padstow, Cornwall with the loss of all hands.
Kendal	United Kingdom	The ship sank in the River Mersey. She was on a voyage from Dublin to Liverpool, Lancashire.
Providenza	Spain	The ship was wrecked at Le Conquet, Finistère, France with the loss of two of her crew. She was on a voyage from "Molda" to the Île de Ré, Finistère.
Seaforth	United Kingdom	The ship was driven ashore at Holyhead, Anglesey. She was on a voyage from Demerara to Liverpool, Lancashire.

== 24 October ==
List of shipwrecks: 24 October 1820
Ship	State	Description
Anna Sophia	Hamburg	The ship was wrecked on the Vogel Sand, in the North Sea with the loss of three of her crew. She was on a voyage from Rio de Janeiro, United Kingdom of Portugal, Brazil and the Algarves to Hamburg.
Plover	United Kingdom	The schooner was wrecked in the Atlantic Ocean with the loss of twelve of her fifteen crew. The survivors were rescued on 13 November by the packet Blucher United Kingdom.

== 25 October ==
List of shipwrecks: 25 October 1820
Ship	State	Description
Clara	United Kingdom	The ship was driven ashore at Bayonne, Basses-Pyrénées, France. Her crew were rescued. She was on a voyage from Newfoundland, British North America to San Sebastián, Spain.
Cushenden	United Kingdom	The ship was driven ashore in Cushenden Bay. She was on a voyage from Belfast to Ballycastle, County Antrim.
Hunter	United Kingdom	The ship sprang a leak and was beached in Davis's Cove, Saint Lucia. She was on a voyage from Jamaica to Havana, Cuba.
Mary and Betty	United Kingdom	The ship was driven ashore at Mockbeggar, Cheshire with the loss of eight of the eleven people on board. She was on a voyage from Wexford to Liverpool, Lancashire. She was refloated on 4 November and taken in to Liverpool.
Nancy	United Kingdom	The ship was driven ashore at Tönningen, Duchy of Holstein. She was on a voyage from Husum, Duchy of Holstein to an English port.

== 26 October ==
List of shipwrecks: 26 October 1820
Ship	State	Description
Cornborough	United Kingdom	The ship was sighted in the Kattegat whilst on a voyage from Dundee, Forfarshire to Riga, Russia, No further trace, presumed foundered with the loss of all hands.
Friends	United Kingdom	The ship was wrecked on the Falsterbo Reef, in the Baltic Sea off the coast of Sweden. She was on a voyage from Leith, Lothian to Saint Petersburg, Russia.
Friend's Increase	United Kingdom	The ship sprang a leak and foundered off Ailsa Craig. Her crew were rescued.
Resolution	United Kingdom	The ship was driven ashore near Abererch, Caernarvonshire. She was on a voyage from Saint John, New Brunswick, British North America to Glasgow, Renfrewshire. She was refloated on 22 November and taken in to Pwllheli, Caernarvonshire.
William	United Kingdom	The ship foundered off Ayr with some loss of life. She was on a voyage from Cork to Glasgow.
William Pitt	United Kingdom	The ship was driven ashore and sank at Trelleborg, Sweden. She was on a voyage from Stettin to London.

== 27 October ==
List of shipwrecks: 27 October 1820
Ship	State	Description
Endeavour	United Kingdom	The ship was driven ashore at Formby, Lancashire. Her crew were rescued. She was on a voyage from Liverpool, Lancashire to Dumfries.
Josephine	France	The ship was lost near Paimpol, Côtes-du-Nord.
Two Brothers	United Kingdom	The ship was driven ashore at Figueira da Foz, Portugal.

== 29 October ==
List of shipwrecks: 29 October 1820
Ship	State	Description
Betsey	United Kingdom	The ship sprang a leak and was abandoned off Cape de Gatt, Spain. She was on a voyage from Dénia, Spain to London.
Charles Henry	United Kingdom	The ship brig sprang a leak and capsized in the Irish Sea off St. Anns Head, Pembrokeshire. Two crew were rescued. She was on a voyage from Wexford to London. Charles Henry later came ashore and was wrecked.
Flora	United Kingdom	The ship was driven ashore and wrecked at Dover, Kent. Her crew were rescued. She was on a voyage from Calais, France to Dover.
Prut (Прут, 'Rod')	Imperial Russian Navy	The transport ship ran aground 0.5 nautical miles (1 km) west of the western cape of Vuzka Bay, and was wrecked on 31 October. Her crew were rescued. She was on a voyage from Odesa to Sevastopol.

== 30 October ==
List of shipwrecks: 30 October 1820
Ship	State	Description
Lloyd	United Kingdom	The ship was driven ashore at Jersey, Channel Islands. She was on a voyage from Plymouth, Devon to Jersey.
Sally	United Kingdom	The ship was driven ashore at Gorleston, Suffolk and abandoned by her crew.

== 31 October ==
List of shipwrecks: 31 October 1820
Ship	State	Description
Experiment	United Kingdom	The ship was lost off the Eddystone Lighthouse. Her crew survived. She was on a voyage from Exeter to Plymouth, Devon.
Henry	United Kingdom	The ship sprang a leak and was beached at St. Ann's Head, Pembrokeshire; where she was wrecked with the loss of four of her six crew. She was on a voyage from Wexford to London.
Race Horse	(United Kingdom of Great Britain and Ireland) Guernsey	The ship was abandoned by her crew whilst on a voyage from Trinidad, Cuba to Havana, Cuba. Her crew were rescued by an American schooner. Race Horse subsequently foundered.
Waterloo	United Kingdom	The ship was abandoned in the Atlantic Ocean. Her crew were rescued by Merchant (United States). Waterloo was on a voyage from Saint John, New Brunswick, British North America to Liverpool, Lancashire.

== Unknown date ==
List of shipwrecks: Unknown date in October 1820
Ship	State	Description
Ann	United Kingdom	The ship ran aground in the Saint Lawrence River between 14 and 21 October. She was on a voyage from Dublin to Quebec City, Lower Canada, British North America.
Columbus	United Kingdom	The ship foundered in the North Sea off Texel, North Holland, Netherlands.
Diana	(United Kingdom of Great Britain and Ireland) India	The ship was lost in the Khuriya Muriya Islands, off Muscat with the loss of more than fourteen lives.
Eliza	United Kingdom	The ship ran aground in the Saint Lawrence River between 14 and 21 October. She was on a voyage from Liverpool, Lancashire to Quebec City. Eliza had been refloated by 26 October and resumed her voyage.
Eliza Margaret	United Kingdom	The ship was lost on the coast of Norway. Her crew were rescued. She was on a voyage from Riga, Russia to Leith Lothian.
Emily	United Kingdom	The ship was driven ashore and wrecked at Bangor, County Down. She was on a voyage from Liverpool, Lancashire to New Brunswick, British North America.
Happy Return	United Kingdom	The ship ran aground on Knoch John, in the White Sea in late October. She was on a voyage from Arkhangelsk, Russia to Liverpool.
James Berridge	United Kingdom	The ship was driven ashore at the mouth of the Garonne before 24 October. She was on a voyage from London to Porto, Portugal.
Jenny	United Kingdom	The ship was driven ashore near Lossiemouth, Inverness-shire. She was on a voyage from Nairn to Hamburg.
Kendal	United Kingdom	The ship sank in the River Mersey at Liverpool.
Ocean	United Kingdom	The ship was lost in the Bay of Fundy off Brier Island, Nova Scotia, British North America. Her crew were rescued. She was on a voyage from Aberdeen to Petitcodiac, New Brunswick, British North America.
Princess Royal	United Kingdom	The ship ran aground and was severely damaged in the Saint Lawrence River in early October.
Release	United Kingdom	The ship is presumed to have foundered whilst on a voyage from London to Antwerp, Netherlands.
Sarah & Eliza	United Kingdom	The ship was driven ashore in the River Boyne. She was on a voyage from New Brunswick to Drogheda, County Louth.
Sophia	(United Kingdom of Great Britain and Ireland) Jamaica	The ship was wrecked on Mayaguana, Bahamas. Her crew were rescued. She was on a voyage from Port Antonio to Saint John, New Brunswick.
Susannah	United Kingdom	The ship was lost at Saint John, New Brunswick, British North America.
Tobago	United Kingdom	The ship was driven ashore at Saltfleet, Lincolnshire. She was on a voyage from London to South Shields, County Durham. Tobago was later refloated.
Vrow Eliza	Netherlands	The ship was wrecked whilst on a voyage from Bergen, Norway to Antwerp. Her crew were rescued.
William & Catherine	Sweden	The ship sprang a leak and foundered in the Atlantic Ocean. Three of her crew survived. She was on a voyage from Porto, Portugal to Norway.
