= Edenburg (disambiguation) =

Edenburg is a town south of Bloemfontein in Free State province, South Africa.

Edenburg may also refer to:

- Edenburg, Gauteng, South Africa
- Edenburg, Pennsylvania, United States
- Edenburg, Saskatchewan, Canada

== See also ==
- Edinburg (disambiguation)
- Edinburgh (disambiguation)
