= Evil Under the Sun (disambiguation) =

Evil Under the Sun is a 1941 novel by Agatha Christie.

The title may also refer to:

== Adaptations of the 1941 novel by Agatha Christie ==
- Evil Under the Sun (1982 film), a British mystery film based on the Agatha Christie novel
- Evil Under the Sun (2001 film), an episode in the series Agatha Christie's Poirot, starring David Suchet
- Agatha Christie: Evil Under the Sun, video game released for the PC and Nintendo Wii

== Other ==
- Evil Under the Sun, a 1951 novel by Anton Myrer
