= Bigbury =

Village and civil parish in south Devon, England

Coordinates: 50°18′5.66″N 3°52′22.80″W

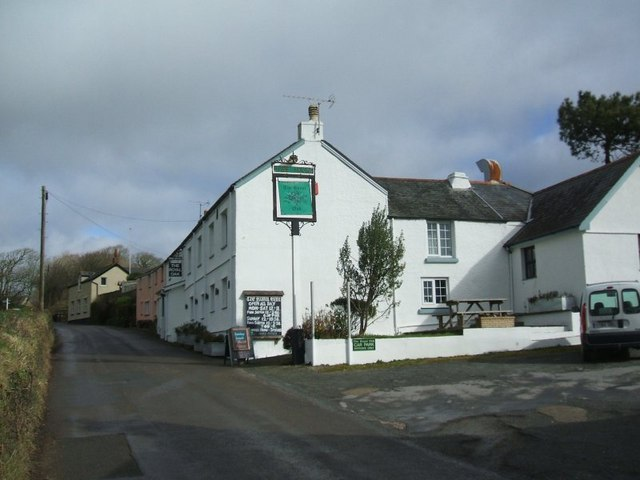
- Royal Oak Inn

- Location within Devon
- Population: 582 (2001 census)
- Civil parish: Bigbury
- District: South Hams
- Shire county: Devon
- Region: South West
- Country: England
- Sovereign state: United Kingdom

Bigbury is a village and civil parish in the South Hams district of Devon, England. According to the 2001 census the parish had a population of 582, compared to 260 in 1901, and decreasing to 500 in 2011. The southern side of the parish lies on the coast, and it is surrounded clockwise from the west by the parishes of Ringmore, Modbury, Aveton Gifford, and on the opposite bank of the estuary of the River Avon, Thurlestone. Road access to the parish is via the A379 and the B3392. The parish council meets on the second Wednesday of every month at 7.30pm in Bigbury Memorial Hall (excluding August & January).

The village of Bigbury has a grid reference SX667464 and is near the coastal village of Bigbury-on-Sea, just offshore of which is Burgh Island. The parish also includes the eastern part of the small bay and beach at Challaborough.

== History ==
In 1086 the parish was recorded as Bicheberie in the ancient hundred of Alleriga. When Alleriga Hundred was partitioned, Bigbury parish became part of Ermington Hundred. Bigbury's church, dedicated to St Lawrence, is partly early 14th century and partly as rebuilt by J. D. Sedding in 1872. Apart from the western tower topped by a spire very little is obviously medieval. The two monumental brasses are early 15th century. The baptismal font, sedilia and piscina are early 14th century, while the lectern and pulpit date from the following century. Both the lectern and pulpit were moved here from Ashburton church: the lectern is attributed to Thomas Prideaux and thought to be a donation of the Bishop of Exeter ca. 1510-15.
