= Burgh Island Hotel =

Hotel in Devon, England

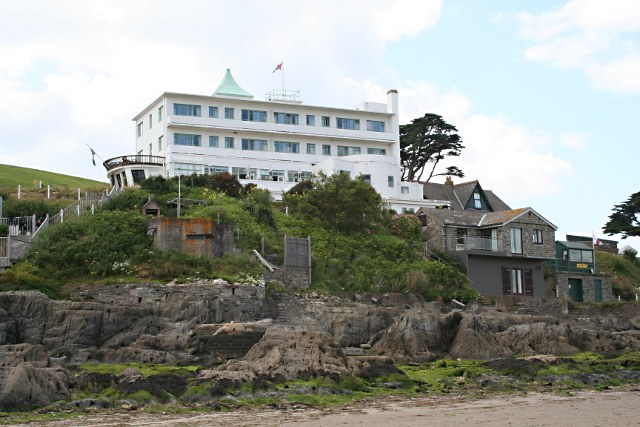
- The Burgh Island Hotel in 2009

- Location within Devon

General information
- Location: Burgh Island, Devon
- Coordinates: 50°16′47.06″N 3°53′52.94″W
- Opening: 1929

Design and construction
- Architect: Matthew Dawson
- Developer: Archibald Nettlefold

Other information
- Number of rooms: 25

Website
- Official website

The Burgh Island Hotel is a hotel on Burgh Island, Devon in England.

== History ==
In the 1890s, the music hall star George H. Chirgwin built a prefabricated wooden house on the island, which was used by guests for weekend parties. The island was sold in 1927 to the filmmaker Archibald Nettlefold of Nettlefold Studios, the heir to the Guest, Keen and Nettlefolds engineering firm, who built a more substantial hotel in the Art Deco style, which became a popular destination in the 1930s. Additions were made through the 1930s, including a room created from the captain's cabin of the warship HMS Ganges (1821). The hotel is now a Grade II listed building

During World War II, the hotel was used as a recovery centre for wounded RAF personnel. The top two floors of the hotel were damaged by a bomb during the conflict. Despite being repaired, it suffered a period of post war decline after being converted to self-catering apartment accommodation. The hotel was restored during the early 1990s by Tony and Beatrice Porter.

== Notable visitors ==
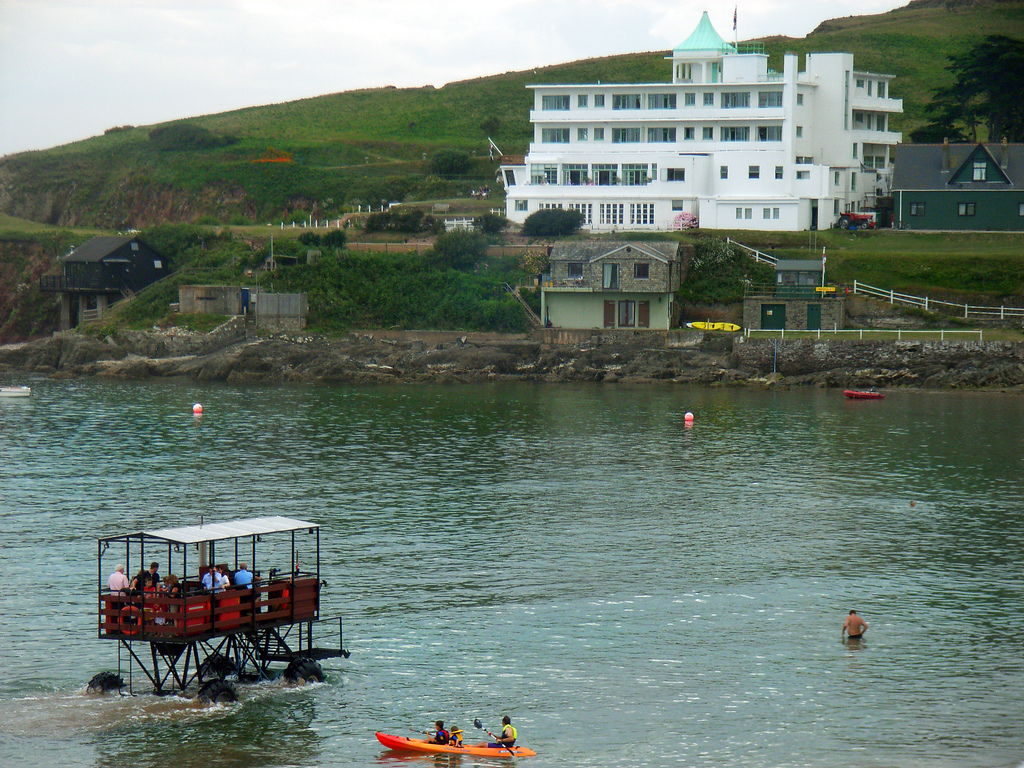
Burgh Island Hotel in 2005

Burgh Island Hotel is linked to the crime novelist Agatha Christie, as it inspired the settings for both And Then There Were None and the Hercule Poirot mystery Evil Under the Sun. The Beatles used the hotel when they were playing a concert in Plymouth. Other guests who have reputedly used the hotel include Edward VIII and Wallis Simpson and it is said that Eisenhower and Churchill met there in the weeks leading up to the D-Day invasion.

== Transport ==
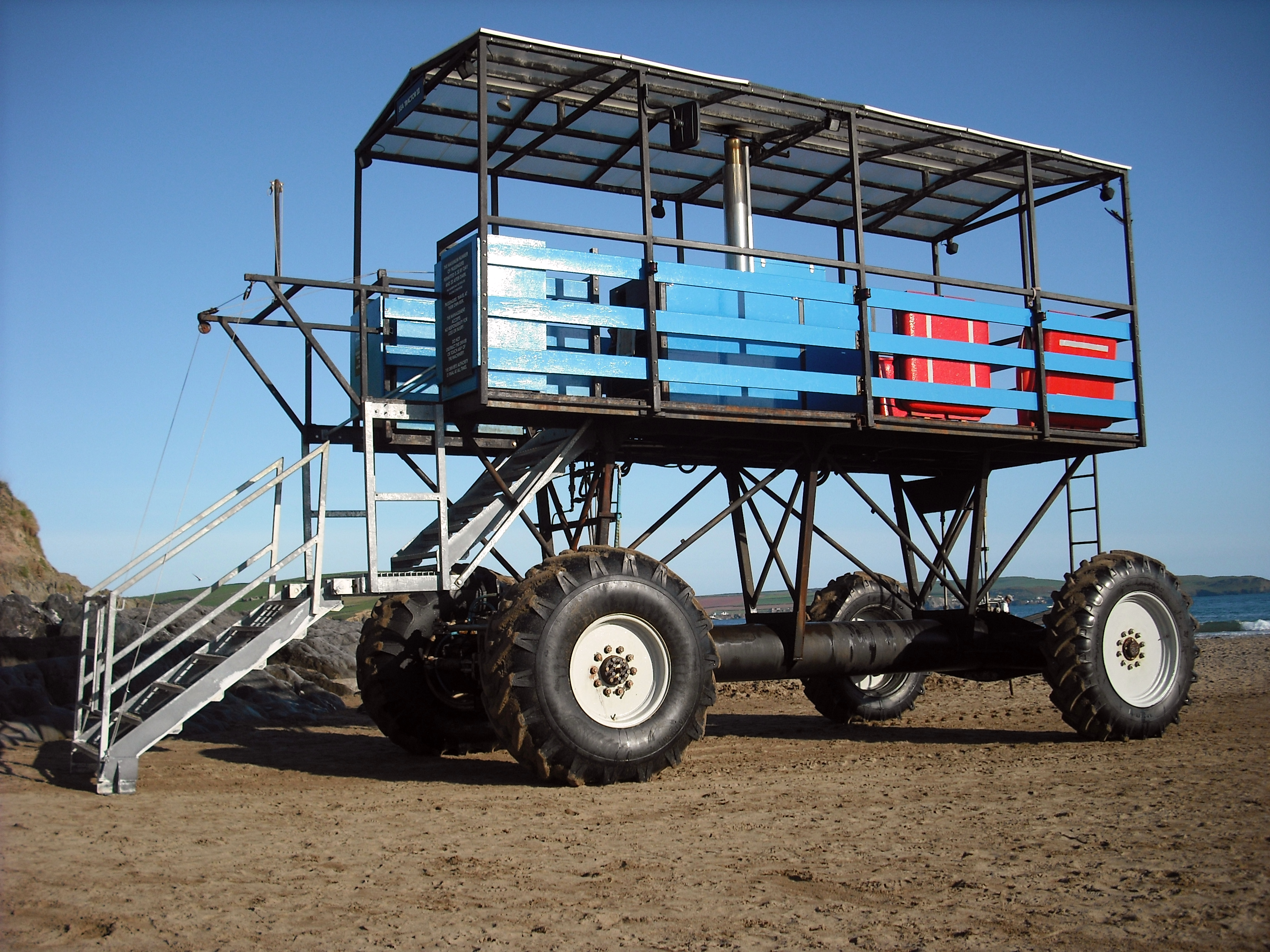
A sea tractor is used to ferry visitors to the hotel during high tide.

The island is approximately 250 metres (270 yards) from the mainland at Bigbury-on-Sea and is a tidal island, approachable on foot at low tide via a tract of hard sand. At high tide, a sea tractor transports passengers back and forth, operated by the hotel. The first sea tractor dated to 1929. By the end of World War 2 a DUKW "duck" amphibious vehicle was being used. A new sea tractor came in 1955, and the current third generation tractor dates from 1969. The vehicle drives across the beach with its wheels underwater on the sandy bottom while its driver and passengers sit on a platform high above. Power from a Fordson tractor engine is relayed to the wheels via hydraulic motors. In 2011, the fare cost £2 per person.

== Media ==
The 2001 TV adaptation of Agatha Christie's Evil Under the Sun used the island as a filming location. Several scenes from the BBC’s 1987 dramatisation of Christie’s story Nemesis were filmed in the hotel. In 1994 "Somewhere Over the Rainbow", an episode of the television series Lovejoy, was set and filmed on the island. The island was the location for GMTV's Inch-loss Island slimming feature in 2008, as it was for the original series in 2001. The climactic scene of the 1965 British film Catch Us If You Can (featuring The Dave Clark Five) takes place at the island. It was also used as a setting for an episode of Dixon of Dock Green in 1973.
