= City of Edinburgh (ship) =

City of Edinburgh may refer to a number of ships, all named after the city of Edinburgh, Scotland:

- Edinburgh, an armed privateer built and homed at Leith involved in engagements with the French in 1760
- City of Edinburgh (1803 ship), a 304-ton (bm) ship built at Quebec by Henry Baldwin.
- City of Edinburgh (1807 ship) was a Spanish vessel, built in France, that a British frigate brought into the Cape of Good Hope in 1807 as a prize. There investors purchased her to trade with the penal colony of Port Jackson. She foundered in 1812 near the Azores while en route from Lima to Cadiz.
- City of Edinburgh (1813 ship), a 367-ton (bm) merchant ship built at Coringa in 1813, that transported convicts from Ireland to Port Jackson in 1828 and 1832. Later, she made a whaling voyage to New Zealand. In 1837 her owners sold her in London as a "Free Trader". She was wrecked in 1840.
- City of Edinburgh (1822 ship), a 301-ton (bm) merchant ship built at London in 1821 or 1822. The General Steam Navigation Company purchased her in 1836; there is no record of her subsequent fate.
- City of Edinburgh (1824 ship), a 454-ton (bm) merchant ship built in Leith in 1824 for the "Australian Company". Her crew abandoned her in the Atlantic in November 1841.
- City of Edinburgh, of 599 tons (bm), was launched in 1852. George Smith & Sons sold her in to J. McAlister. In 1869 she was wrecked in Bay of Bengal.
- City of Edinburgh, of 1,206 tons (bm), was launched in 1868. She sailed for George Smith & Co., and in 1874. In 1874 the vessel sank at Calcutta in a collision with French Empire.
- HMT City of Edinburgh II was a trawler launched at Dundee in 1907. The British Admiralty requisitioned her in 1914 and again in 1915 and she served as the auxiliary patrol vessel HMT City of Edinburgh. She returned to civilian service in 1919; she was wrecked in 1952.
- City of Edinburgh (1903 ship). Owned 1901 by J. R. Ellerman, Liverpool; 1910 Ellerman Lines Ltd. - G. Smith & Sons, Liverpool. Steel Screw Steamer 4 Masts. Was built in Glasgow in 1899 as Maplemore, and scrapped at Bo'ness (Borrowstounness), Scotland, on 9 May 1929. She sailed from Southampton to the Cape on 29/30 November 1899, carrying 441 men and 352 horses to fight in the Boer War, and was then directed to Sydney, arriving 7 March 1900. The number painted on her side was 65. She carried Australian troops (including members of the Bushmen's Corps) to the Cape, leaving Fremantle on 17 March 1900. She also carried 510 Australian troops from Sydney to the Cape, sailing from Sydney on 15 March 1901. A painting by Reginald Arthur Borstel (1875–1922) entitled The Maplemore at Sea is held by the Australian War Memorial. Her name was officially changed to SS City of Edinburgh in 1903. Due to not having let go her anchor while being tugged out of Queen's Dock, Glasgow, she was involved in a collision with SS Glassmore on 21 September 1903. Her owners were later fined £1,200 in damages. She was used as a troop ship in the First World War. According to W Devlin, the 3rd Canadian Battalion sailed from England to France (Avonmouth to St-Nazaire) on SS City of Edinburgh in February 1915. According to 'Lost in Tilloy', quoting from the HMSO publication British Vessels Lost at Sea: 1914–18, City of Edinburgh weighed 6,255 tons and was attacked by a submarine (torpedo and gunfire) in the English Channel on 2 July 1915. Although the torpedo missed, there were four deaths (presumably from gunfire). A second attack - gunfire from a submarine - occurred in the Channel on 26 October 1916, with no loss of life.

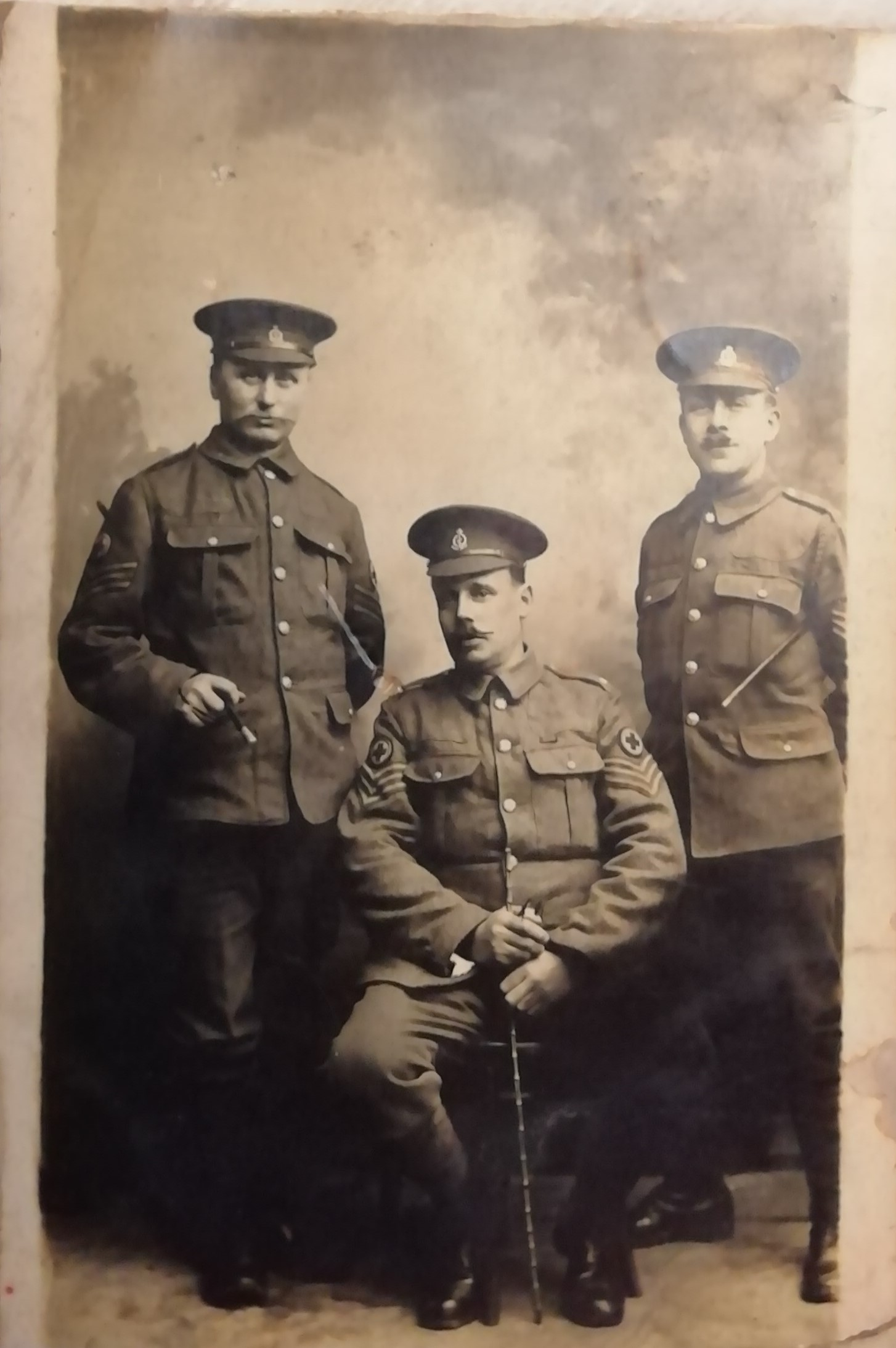
Sergeant John Christopher Barnes (pharmacist, left) with two other Royal Army Medical Corps Sergeants, SS City of Edinburgh, 17 March 1915

== See also ==
- HMS Edinburgh
