= Jap fiddle =

One-stringed musical instrument

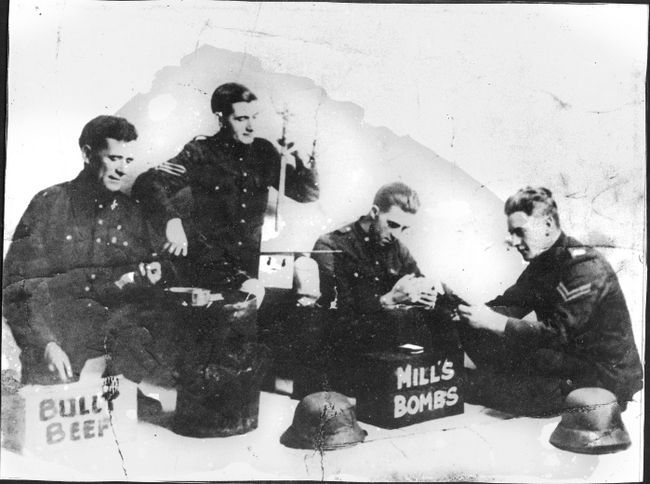
Commonwealth troops with a Jap fiddle during World War I

The Jap fiddle or Japanese fiddle was a one-stringed bowed instrument used by street performers, music hall performers, and vaudevillians around the start of the 20th century, particularly in the United Kingdom and United States. The instrument was particularly associated with Cockney blackface performer G. H. Chirgwin. A variant was later produced with a vibrating membrane and horn for amplification, as a one-stringed phonofiddle.

The instrument was likely named for its vague similarity to the Japanese kokyū, as in the late 1800s interest in East Asia had been piqued (see Chinoiserie) by the opening of Japan to foreign trade (see Foreign relations of Meiji Japan).
