= Sea tractor =

Wheeled motor vehicle

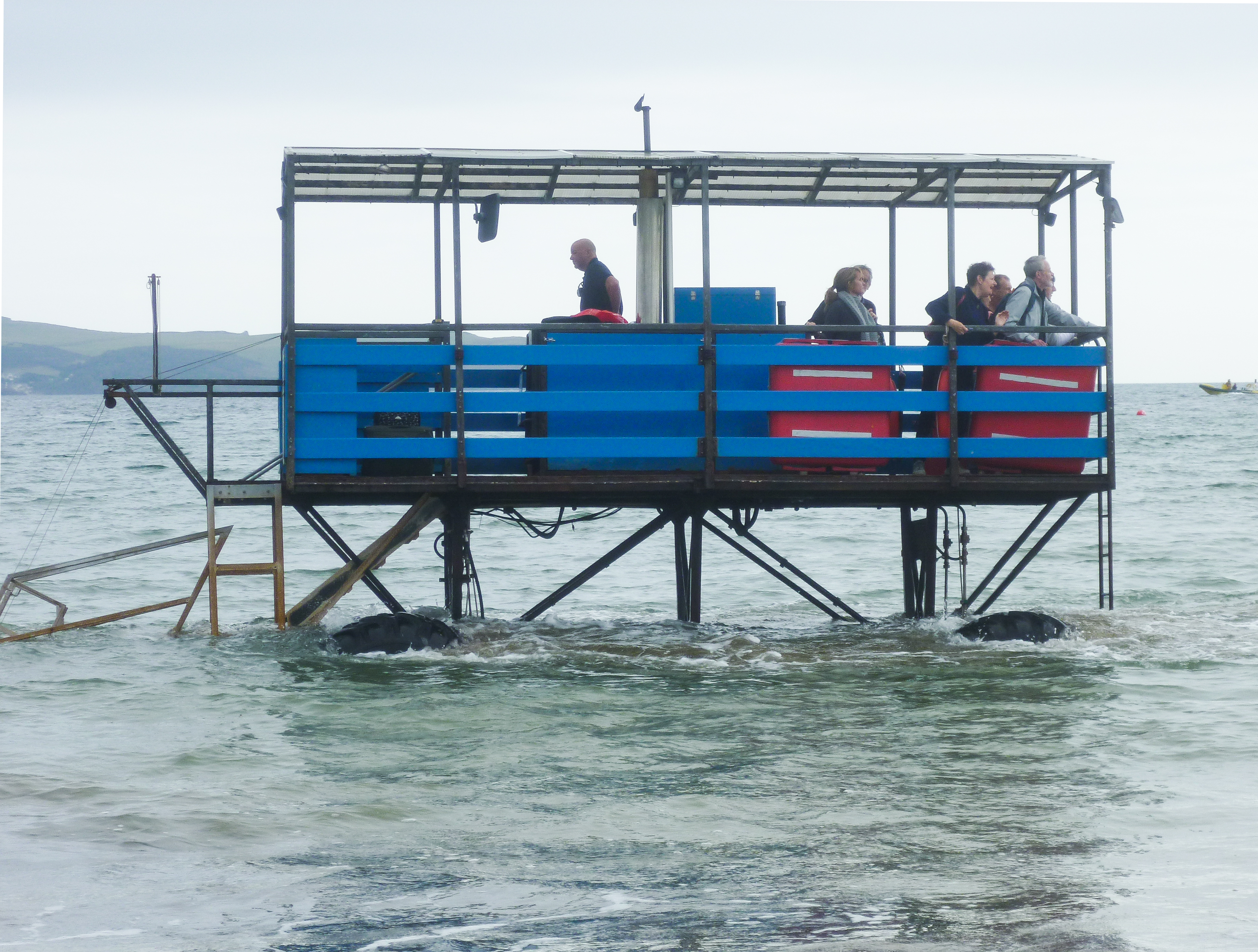
In operation

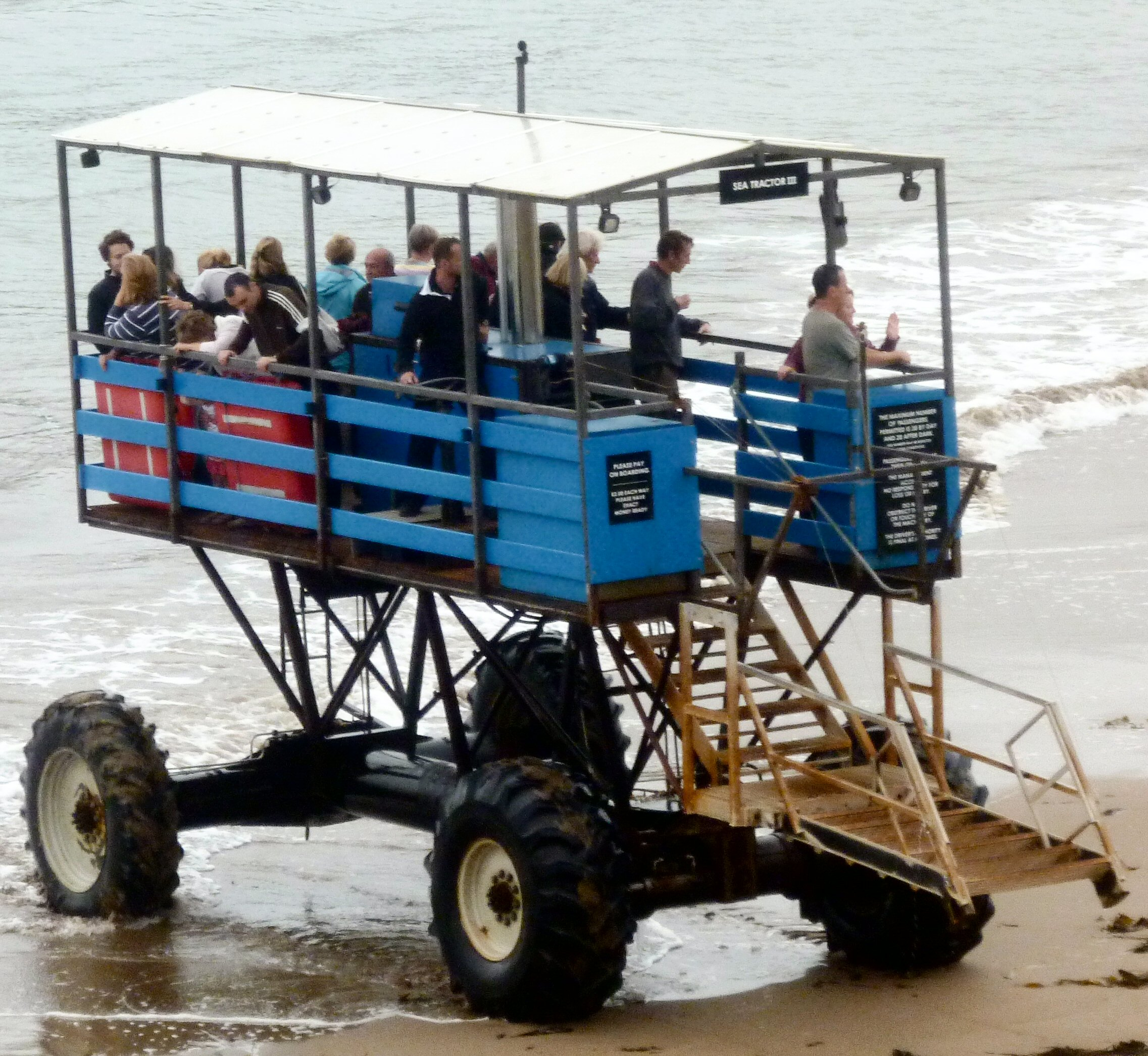
Exiting the water with passengers

The Burgh Island Hotel's sea tractor in September 2011

A sea tractor is a motor vehicle designed to travel through shallow seawater, carrying passengers on a platform elevated above a submerged chassis. The sea tractor was most popular during the early 1930s, as a unique way to give scenic tours to patrons of waterfront hotels and resorts. In other applications, sea tractors were used simply as a ferry through shallow waters. The use of sea tractors has declined since, as boats, ferries, and other aquatic vessels often serve the same function much more efficiently and comfortably.

== Examples ==
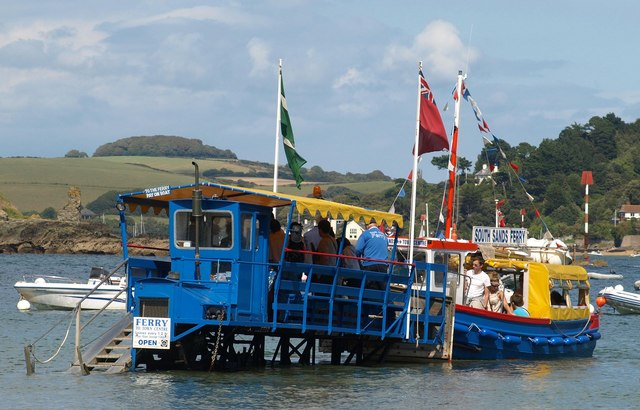
The South Sands sea tractor docked with a ferry for the transfer of passengers, August 2011

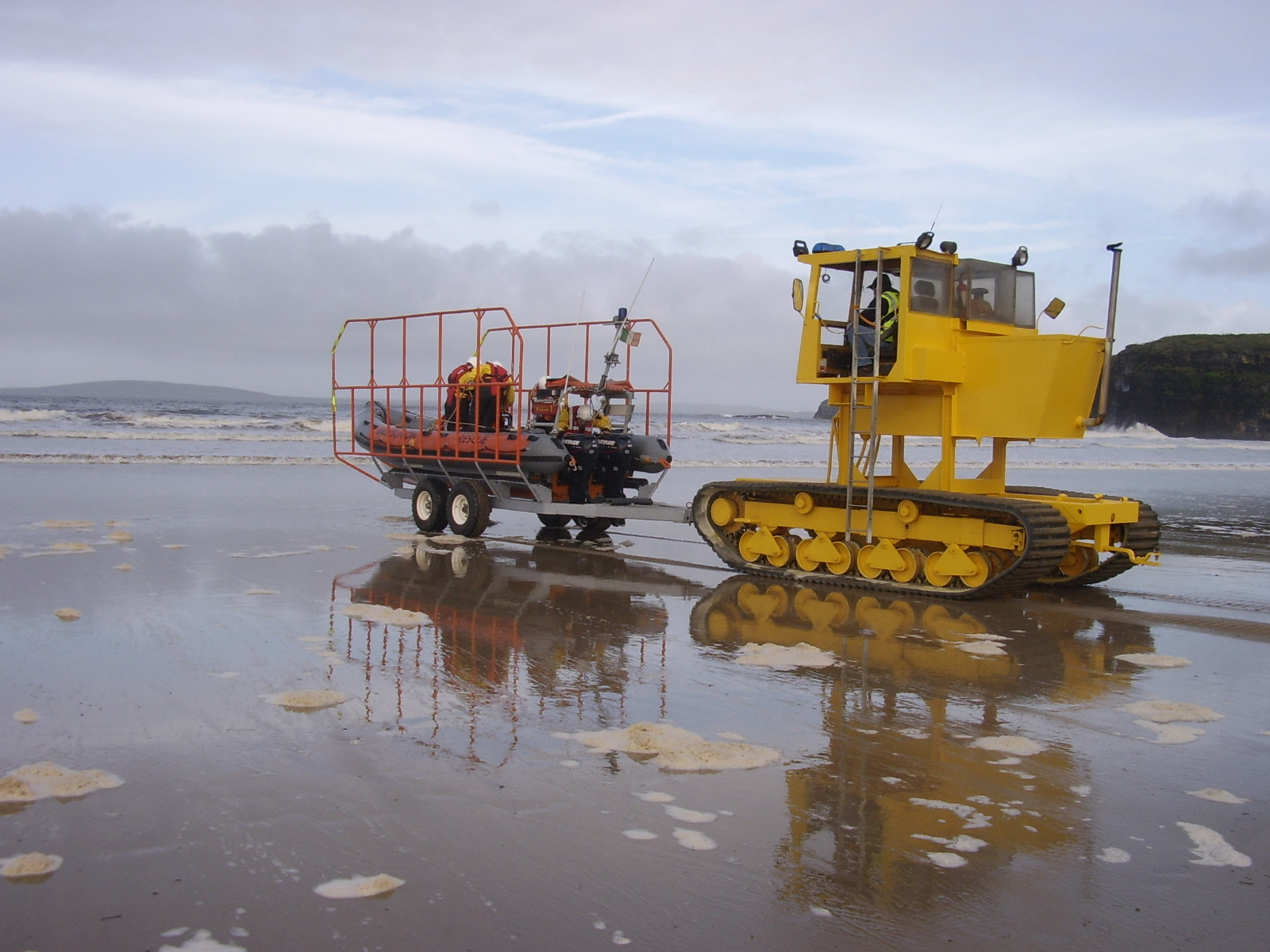
The boat-launching vehicle used by Ballybunion Sea and Cliff Rescue, 2008

The hotel at Burgh Island operates a sea tractor, to carry hotel guests and other visitors the 250 m (273 yd) to the island at high tide, when the causeway connecting the island to the Devon mainland is submerged. The current tractor is the third one to be used at this location.

A sea tractor is also used at South Sands Beach near Salcombe, Devon. The beach has no jetty or pier, and the South Sands Ferry therefore cannot reach dry land to pick up passengers. The sea tractor transports passengers to the ferry waiting a few metres out to sea.

The United States Army Corps of Engineers operates a three-wheeled sea tractor called the Coastal Research Amphibious Buggy (CRAB). This 8.2-tonne (18,000 lb) vehicle consists of a wheeled tripod supporting an operating platform 10.7 metres (35 ft) above ground level. It can move at 2 kilometres per hour (1.2 mph) on land and at a somewhat slower speed in water. It was built for scientific research on beach nourishment.

Ballybunion Sea and Cliff Rescue, based at Ballybunion in the west of Ireland, operates a specially-constructed, tracked sea-tractor, used for launching and recovering the group's Atlantic 75-class lifeboat.

== Popular culture ==
=== Books, TV, movies, and games ===
Sea tractors have been featured on the children's show Teletubbies.

The Burgh Island sea tractor also appears as the method of transport between the mainland and the island in the 1941 Agatha Christie novel Evil Under the Sun. As a result, it also appears in the "Evil Under the Sun" (2001) episode of ITV's Agatha Christie's Poirot TV series, and features prominently in the 2007 adventure game Agatha Christie: Evil Under the Sun, both of which were adapted from the novel. In the game, the player can use a phone on the beach to summon the tractor to transport Poirot from the island to the village on the mainland.

The second Burgh Island sea tractor features in the 1965 Dave Clark Five film Catch Us If You Can (1965).

The Burgh Island sea tractor appears in the 1994 episode of the TV series Lovejoy "Somewhere: Over the Rainbow?" (episode 66 of 73).

The third episode of the first series of the British pre-school television programme Milkshake Monkey features a sea tractor.

The Burgh Island sea tractor also features in season 6, episode 5 of the British television programme Mortimer & Whitehouse: Gone Fishing.

== See also ==
- BARV, a tracked military vehicle designed to wade through seawater up to three metres (9 ft 10 in) deep.
- Brighton and Rottingdean Seashore Electric Railway, a late 19th-century railway that ran on submerged rails.
- Category:Sea-going tractors, for tractors used in water without an elevated platform
- Swamp buggy, for tractors designed to move through shallow water in a swamp
