= Edinburgh City =

The city of Edinburgh is the capital of Scotland, United Kingdom. Edinburgh City may refer to:

- Edinburgh City F.C., a semi-professional football club
- Edinburgh City F.C. (1928), an amateur football club (dissolved 1955)
- City of Edinburgh Council, the local authority body

== See also ==
Edinburgh (disambiguation)
