= New Edinburgh News =

New Edinburgh News is a local newspaper published in New Edinburgh, a community in Ottawa. The publication was founded in 1976. The current editor of the newspaper is Christina Leadlay. This newspaper is subscribed to by the Governor General of Canada and the Prime Minister of Canada. The embassies of France and South Africa also subscribe to this local newspaper.

Current and archival editions of the paper are available as PDF to download on its website: newedinburgh.ca

The paper provides extensive coverage for local issues (e.g. the unsuccessful fight leading up to and after the closure of Crichton Street Public School in 1999.

== Editors of the paper ==
- Eleanor Dunn - 1976–unknown
- Mick Glover - unknown
- Barbara Benoit - 1993–1999
- Carolyn Brereton - 2000–2005
- Cindy Parkanyi - 2005–2014
- Christina Leadlay - 2014–present

== Contributors ==
- Elizabeth May - Leader of the Green Party of Canada.

== Interviewees ==
- Adrienne Clarkson - former Governor General of Canada
