= Swamp buggy =

Vehicle used to traverse bogs and swamps

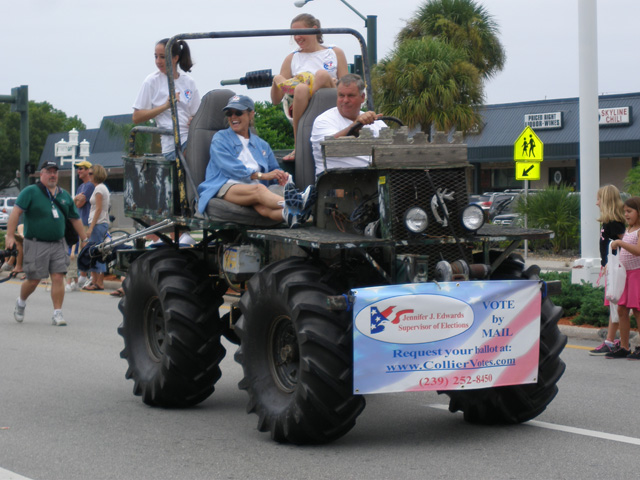
Swamp buggy in parade

A swamp buggy, also known as a marsh buggy, is a motor vehicle used to traverse boggy swamp terrain. Swamp buggies may be purpose-built buggies or vehicles modified to traverse swamp terrain. Swamp buggies are capable of traveling through or over deep mud and water, moderately dense vegetation, and rough terrain possibly including logs and stumps. They may also be capable of floating in water or mud.

== History ==
Invented by Ed Frank in Naples, Florida, the swamp buggy proved valuable during early development of the Everglades in the 1930s and 1940s. Aircraft tires from war surplus often found their way onto swamp buggies in the 1940s and 1950s. Tractor tires commonly used in commercial agriculture became the norm during the 1980s. The state of Florida commissioned the use of buggies by law enforcement as early as the 1930s.

The original swamp buggy, known as "Tumble Bug", was a tall vehicle riding on huge balloon tires, which could be used for everything from hunting expeditions deep into the Everglades to regular outings. An editorial in the Collier County News, a local Naples newspaper, claimed swamp buggies were "as important to Florida as the cow pony is to the west, in that they are the only practical means of transportation once off the main road."

== Types of swamp buggy ==
Though swamp buggy design varies greatly, there are two basic types. The "Glades Buggy", originally a Model A frame with large rear tires, sits lower and resembles a jeep in build. The "Palm Beach Buggy", a type developed in the northern Everglades in and around Palm Beach County, is a raised platform supported by four large wheels which sits quite high. Though these two types predominate, custom buggies sporting tank-like treads and smooth tires with snow chains were used in the past.

== Swamp buggy racing ==
Swamp buggy races were invented in 1949, when a parade through Naples was held and at the end of the parade, the men went to the mud to test their buggies with the crowd watching. Swamp buggy races are now held annually in Naples.

Another tradition started in 1957. The winner grabbed the "swamp buggy queen", the wife of the winner, and threw her into the mud with her dress on. Ever since then, it is a tradition for the winner and the queen to jump into the mud pit together.

In 1986, the first race at the Florida Sports Park took place.

== In popular culture ==
In the 1958 James Bond novel Dr. No, as well as the 1962 Eon Productions James Bond film Dr. No, the "dragon" of the fictional island of Crab Key is an armored swamp buggy armed with a flamethrower. Ian Fleming based the "dragon" on a modified Land Rover swamp buggy used to travel on the island of Inagua.

A swamp buggy is often used by Shelby Stanga on the TV series Ax Men on History.

== See also ==
- Sea tractor
- Mud bogging
- Dune Buggy
