= Dunedin (disambiguation) =

Dunedin is the second-largest city in the South Island of New Zealand.

Dunedin may also refer to:

== Places ==
- Dunedin, Ontario, Canada
- Dunedin (New Zealand electorate), a former electorate, 1853–1905
- Edinburgh, whose Scottish Gaelic name is Dùn Èideann
- Dunedin, Florida, United States

== Other ==
- Dunedin River, a river in British Columbia, Canada
- Dunedin Consort, an Edinburgh-based baroque music ensemble founded in 1996
- Dunedin City AFC, a former New Zealand football club
- Dunedin Multidisciplinary Health and Development Study (a.k.a. the Dunedin Study), a detailed study of human health, development and behaviour, based at the University of Otago in New Zealand

== Ships ==
Listed chronologically

- Dunedin, 1859 Perth, Scotland, 66 GRT, Schooner
- City of Dunedin, 1863 Denny & Rankin, Glasgow, 1084 GRT full rigged wooden ship
- Dunedin, 1865 Quebec, 1298 GRT, full rigged ship
- Dunedin (1874 ship) 1874–1890, the first commercial ship with refrigeration equipment
- Dunedin, 1884 Leith, Scotland, 1326 GRT, Screw Steamer
- HMS Dunedin, 1918, a Royal Navy light cruiser in the Second World War
- Port Dunedin, 1925, 7585 GRT
- MV Dunedin Star, 1936 London

== See also ==
- Edinburgh (disambiguation)
- Dúnedain, a race of men in J. R. R. Tolkien's legendarium
- Duneedon a.k.a. Don Edon, a character in the children's educational television series Read All About It!
