= Dunedin River =

- Location in Canada

Location
- Country: Canada
- Province: British Columbia

The Dunedin River is a river in the province of British Columbia, Canada.

The area around the Dunedin River has less than two inhabitants per square kilometer.

The area is part of the boreal climate zones. The annual average temperature is -2 °C. The warmest month is July, when the average temperature is 16 °C, and the coldest is January, with -20 °C.

== See also ==
- List of rivers of British Columbia
