= HMT City of Edinburgh II =

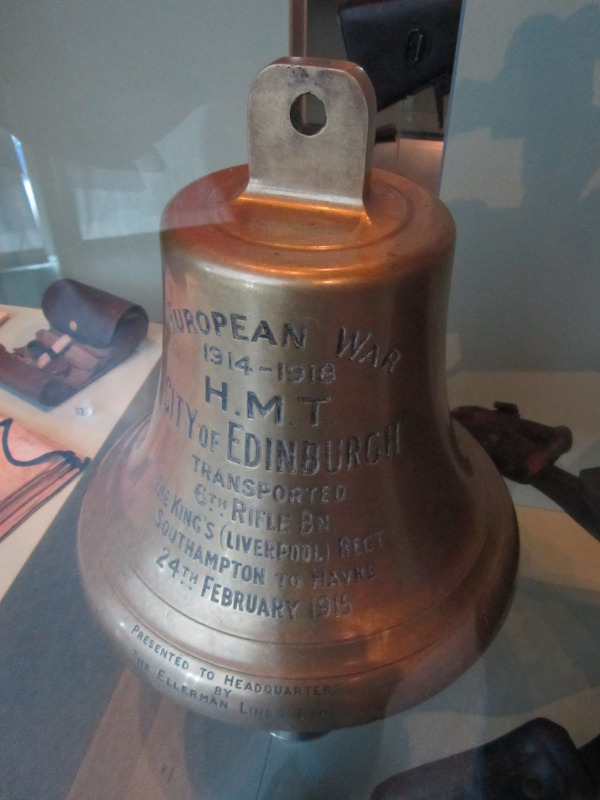
Bell of HMT City of Edinburgh

HMT City of Edinburgh II was a trawler of the same name, launched at Dundee in late December 1907 and completed and registered in January 1908. She had a Gross Tonnage of 300 tons. She served during World War I and was wrecked in 1952.

== War service ==
The Admiralty requisitioned City of Edinburgh in 1914, but then returned her to her owners. On 10 January 1915 the Admiralty again requisitioned her for war service. She received a 6-pounder gun and operated out of St Mary's, Isles of Scilly, as an auxiliary patrol vessel.

City of Edinburgh helped transport the Liverpool Rifles from Southampton to Le Havre on 24 February 1915.

When the troop-transport SS Ballarat was torpedoed on 24 April 1917 (Anzac Day), City of Edinburgh was one of the vessels that helped ensure the safe evacuation of all 1,600 troops aboard, as well as Ballarat's crew.

== Post-war ==
The Admiralty sold her in 1918 to British owners, who sold her in 1921 to Spanish owners.

On 4 January 1952 she became stranded on Cap Blanc, Spanish Sahara (21°45′N 17°00′W), and became a total loss.
