= Edinburgh (disambiguation) =

Edinburgh is the capital city of Scotland.

Edinburgh may also refer to:

== Related to Edinburgh, Scotland ==
- Edinburgh Airport
- University of Edinburgh
- Edinburgh (novel), a novel by author Alexander Chee
- Edinburgh: Picturesque Notes, a 1878 travel book by Robert Louis Stevenson
- Edinburgh (Parliament of Scotland constituency), a pre-1707 constituency
- Livingston (basketball), a now defunct Scottish basketball team, named Edinburgh in 1977–1987
- County of Edinburgh, the formal name of Midlothian until 1890
- Edinburgh International Television Festival, an annual media event in the United Kingdom
- Edinburgh Television, a defunct television station in Edinburgh, United Kingdom

== People ==
- Duke of Edinburgh
- Justin Edinburgh (1969–2019), English footballer

== Places ==
=== Australia ===
- Edinburgh, South Australia
- RAAF Base Edinburgh

=== Canada ===
- Edinburgh Island, Nunavut, Canada
- New Edinburgh, Nova Scotia
- New Edinburgh, Ontario

=== New Zealand ===
- Dunedin, Otago, named after Edinburgh using the Gaelic name (and nicknamed "Edinburgh of the South")

=== South Africa ===
- Edinburgh, Mpumalanga

=== United States ===
- Edinburgh, Indiana
- Edinburgh, the original name of Titusville, Pennsylvania
- Edinboro, Pennsylvania
  - Edinboro University of Pennsylvania
- Edinburg, New Jersey
- Edinburgh, Ohio
- Edinburg, Texas
- Edinburg, Virginia

=== Elsewhere ===
- Edinburgh of the Seven Seas, main settlement of Tristan da Cunha in the South Atlantic
- Edinburgh Hill, point in Livingston Island, South Shetland Islands
- Edinburgh Peak, highest summit of Gough Island

== Ships ==
- HMS Edinburgh, six ships with this name

== See also ==
- Dunedin (disambiguation)
- Edinburgh Place, Hong Kong
- Edinburgh Square, Caledonia, Ontario, Canada
- Edinburgh Agreement (1992), a political compromise reached to accommodate Denmark's objections to the Maastricht Treaty
- Edinburgh Agreement (2012), an agreement over the terms of the 2014 referendum on Scottish independence
- Edithburgh
- Edinburg (disambiguation)
- Edinboro (disambiguation)
- New Edinburgh (disambiguation)
