= Edinburg =

Edinburg may refer to the following places:

== United States ==
- Edinburg, Illinois
- Edinburg, Maine
- Edinburg, Mississippi
- Edinburg, Missouri
- Edinburg, Scotland County, Missouri
- Edinburg, New Jersey
- Edinburg, New York
- Edinburg, North Dakota
- Edinburg Township, Ohio
- Edinburg, Pennsylvania
- Edinburg, Texas
- Edinburg, Virginia
- Edinburg Park, New Jersey
- Edinburg Township, Portage County, Ohio

== Elsewhere ==
- The German exonym for the town of Dzintari, Jelgavas Rajons, Latvia

== See also ==
- Edenburg (disambiguation)
- Edinburgh (disambiguation)
