= Crichton Street Public School =

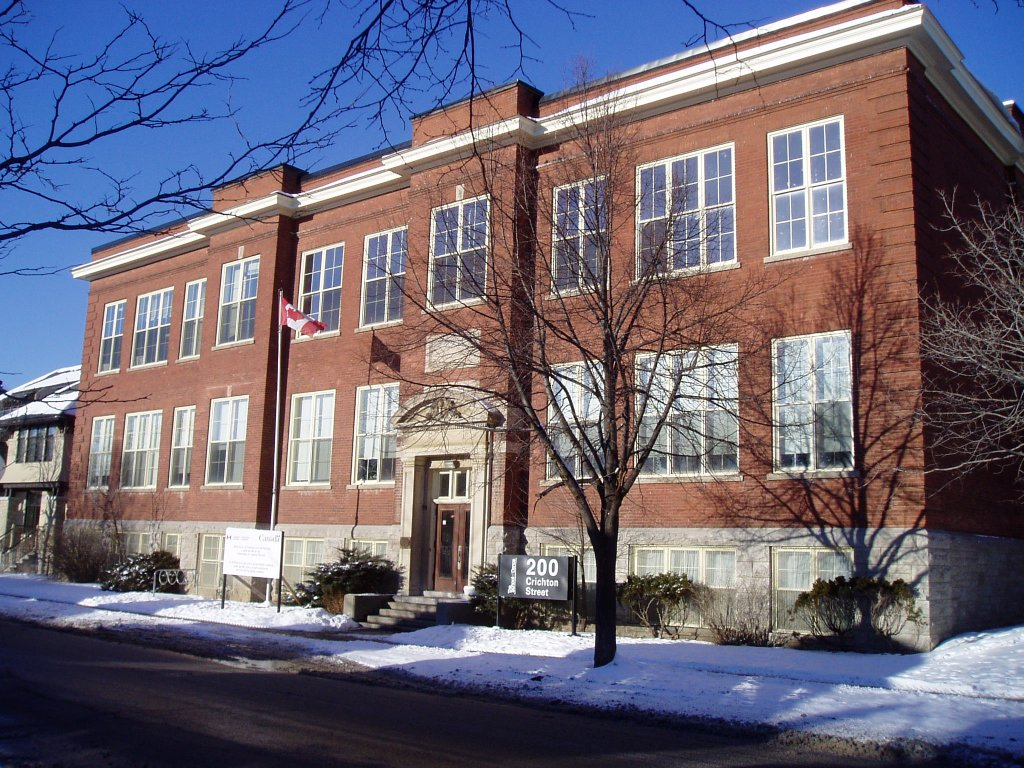

Location
- 200 Crichton Street; Ottawa, Ontario; Canada; 45.4400°N 75.6836°W

Information
- Founded: 1838
- Closed: 1999
- School board: Ottawa Carleton District School Board
- Grades: K6
- Enrollment: 510-1,143
- Language: English, French
- Campus: Urban

Crichton Street Public School was an elementary school in the New Edinburgh neighbourhood of Ottawa, Ontario, Canada until 1999. In 2000, The School of Dance purchased 200 Crichton.

== History ==
The first school in the village of New Edinburgh opened in 1838. The school moved to Crichton Street around 1875. In 1887, when New Edinburgh was annexed to Ottawa, this two-room school house became part of the Ottawa school board. The original structure was demolished in 1919, and a new structure designed by W.B. Garwick was erected.

Over time enrollment fell, and the school was frequently threatened with closure. In the 1980s it became one of a number of Ottawa area alternative schools focused on independent and unstructured learning. In 1991, the City of Ottawa awarded the building heritage status, ensuring that the exterior structure could not be demolished as had been done with Churchill and Lady Evelyn schools when the city rebuilt and thus modernized both schools in the early 1990s. It was eventually shuttered in 1999.

In 2000, The School of Dance purchased 200 Crichton Street.

== Community ==
In 1991, the Grade 6 students at Crichton School met with then city mayor Jacquelin Holzman to protest the city's planned consideration for the expansion of the Vanier Parkway through New Edinburgh over to Hull, Quebec.

In 1998, the Grade 6 students at Crichton School participated in the 25th Anniversary celebrations for the Lester B. Pearson Building, used by Foreign Affairs Canada.

The school had many students whose parents either worked for Foreign Affairs or were foreign diplomats serving in Ottawa.
