= Edinburgh, Mpumalanga =

Edinburgh
- Location within Mpumalanga Location within South Africa
- Coordinates: 24.685°S 31.226°E
- Country: South Africa
- Province: Mpumalanga
- District: Ehlanzeni
- Municipality: Bushbuckridge

Area
  - Total: 3.77 km^{2} (1.46 sq mi)

Population (2011)
  - Total: 2,978
  - Density: 790/km^{2} (2,050/sq mi)

Racial makeup (2011)
  - Black African: 99.9%

First languages (2011)
  - Tsonga: 96.8%
  - Other: 3.2%
- Time zone: UTC+2 (SAST)

Edinburgh is a town in Ehlanzeni District Municipality in the Mpumalanga province of South Africa.
