= Edinboro =

Edinboro may refer to:

- Edinboro, Pennsylvania
  - Edinboro University of Pennsylvania, in Edinboro
- Edinboro, Saint Vincent and the Grenadines
- Jamie Barnwell-Edinboro, English footballer

== See also ==
- Edinburgh (disambiguation)
