= City of Edinburgh (1803 ship) =

Canadian-built British ship (1803–1821)

History

United Kingdom
- Name: City of Edinburgh
- Builder: Henry Baldwin, Quebec
- Launched: 1803
- Fate: Last listed 1821/1822

General characteristics
- Tons burthen: 304, or 310 (bm)
- Length: 97 ft (30 m)
- Beam: 27 ft (8.2 m)
- Armament: 1806:4 × 4-pounder guns; 1810:10 × 6-pounder carronades

City of Edinburgh was built at Quebec in 1803. She sailed to England and from 1804 to 1820 was a West Indiaman and general trader. She sustained damages in maritime incidents in 1805 and 1820, and was last listed in 1821.

== Career ==
A letter dated 2 March 1804, reported that City of Edinburgh's Quebec registration had been cancelled.

City of Edinburgh first entered Lloyd's Register (LR) in 1804, with Postgate, master, Brickwood, owner, and trade London–Quebec. In England she became a West Indiaman. She had some damages repaired in 1805, and by 1806 her trade was London-Antigua. Lloyd's List had reported on 8 February 1805, that City of Edinburgh, Moreton, master, had been onshore near Margate and had received much damage. She had been on a voyage from London to Antigua.

Year	Master	Owner	Trade	Source & notes
1810	Cook Snelhead	Blackett & Co.	London–West Indies	LR; damages repaired 1805
1815	A. Donald	Blackett & Co.	London–Grenada	LR
1820	Godly	Blackett & Co.	London–Cadiz	LR

On 16 October 1820, City of Edinburgh was sailing from Saint John, New Brunswick, British North America, to London when she parted from her anchors at the Isles of Scilly and ran onshore at the Point of the Crow Bar. She filled with water but her cargo and sails were landed. She was refloated on 19 October, and taken in to St Mary's Pier for repairs to her considerable damage. On 10 April 1821, she was seaworthy again and was to proceed to Falmouth under escort by two pilot boats. On 17 April she was sighted off Falmouth under tow by two pilot boats. She arrived the next day under jury masts.

== Fate ==
City of Edinburgh was last listed in Lloyd's Register in 1821, and in the Register of Shipping in 1822. More tellingly, she does not again appear in the Lloyd's List SAD data after her arrival in 1821 at Falmouth in a crippled state.
