= New Edinburgh =

- Neighbourhood
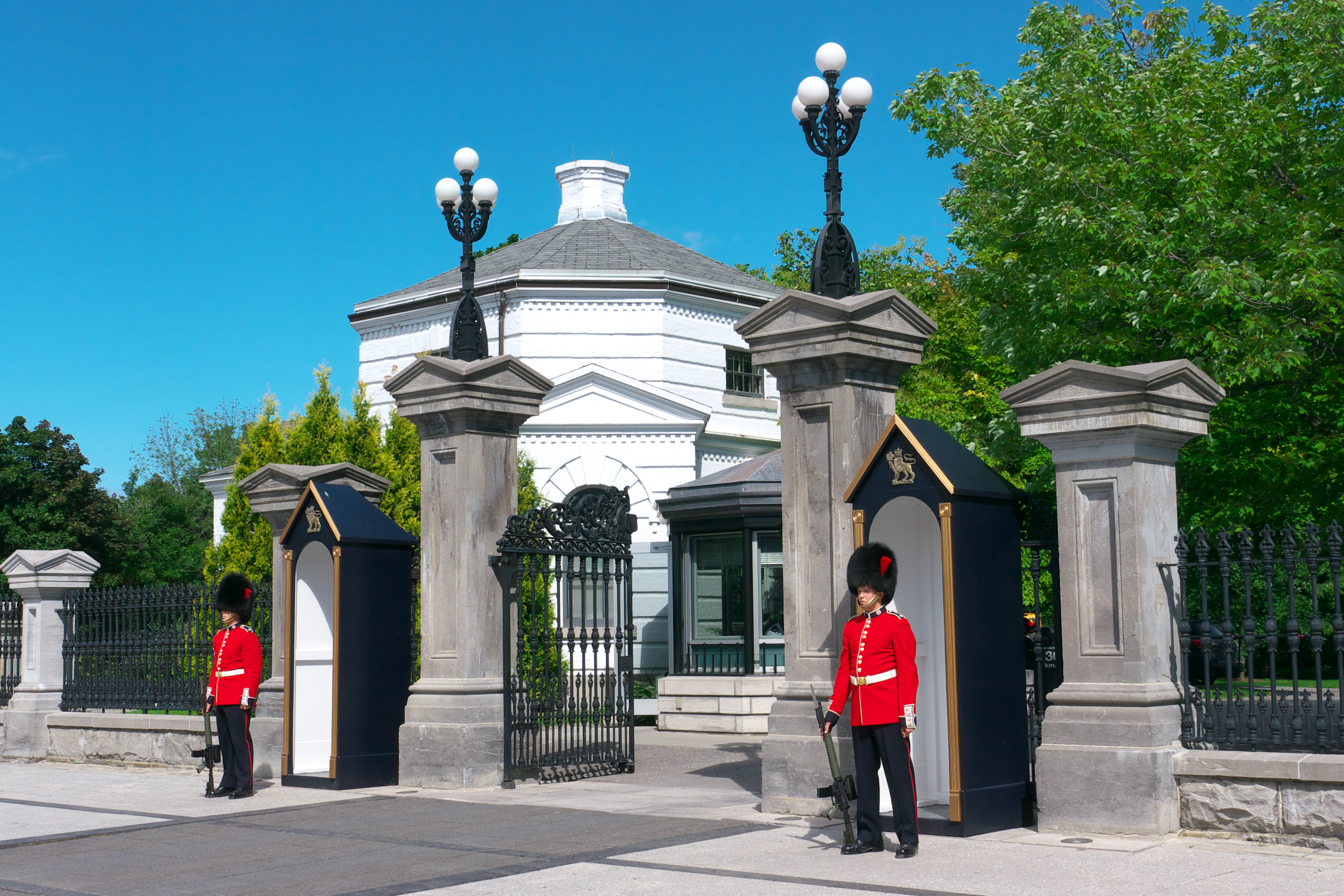
- Main gate of Rideau Hall

- Location in Ottawa
- Coordinates: 45°26′40″N 75°41′30″W
- Country: Canada
- Province: Ontario
- City: Ottawa
- Established: 1829
- Incorporated: 1867 (Village of New Edinburgh)
- Annexation: 1887 (City of Ottawa)

Government
  - MPs: Mona Fortier
  - MPPs: Lucille Collard
  - Councillors: Rawlson King
- Elevation: 60 m (200 ft)

Population (2016)
  - Total: 3,539
- Canada 2016 Census
- Time zone: UTC-5 (Eastern (EST))
- Forward sortation area: K1M

New Edinburgh is a neighbourhood in Rideau-Rockcliffe Ward, in Ottawa, Ontario, Canada. It is located to the northeast of the downtown core. It is bordered on the west by the Rideau River, to the north by the Ottawa River, to the south by Beechwood Avenue, and on the east by Springfield Road and the former Rockcliffe Park village limits.

The area is an older, affluent neighbourhood. The Governor General of Canada's large residence and grounds are located in New Edinburgh, as is 24 Sussex Drive, official residence of the Prime Minister of Canada.

The neighbourhood is home to several embassies and consulates, including those of Spain, South Africa, France, India, Vietnam, and Slovakia. Civil servants (in particular, employees of the nearby Global Affairs Canada) compose a fair portion of the population. Like Rockcliffe Park, the neighbourhood is largely English-speaking, in comparison to the French-speaking district of Vanier to the south.

The total population of New Edinburgh is 3,539 (2016 Census).

== History ==
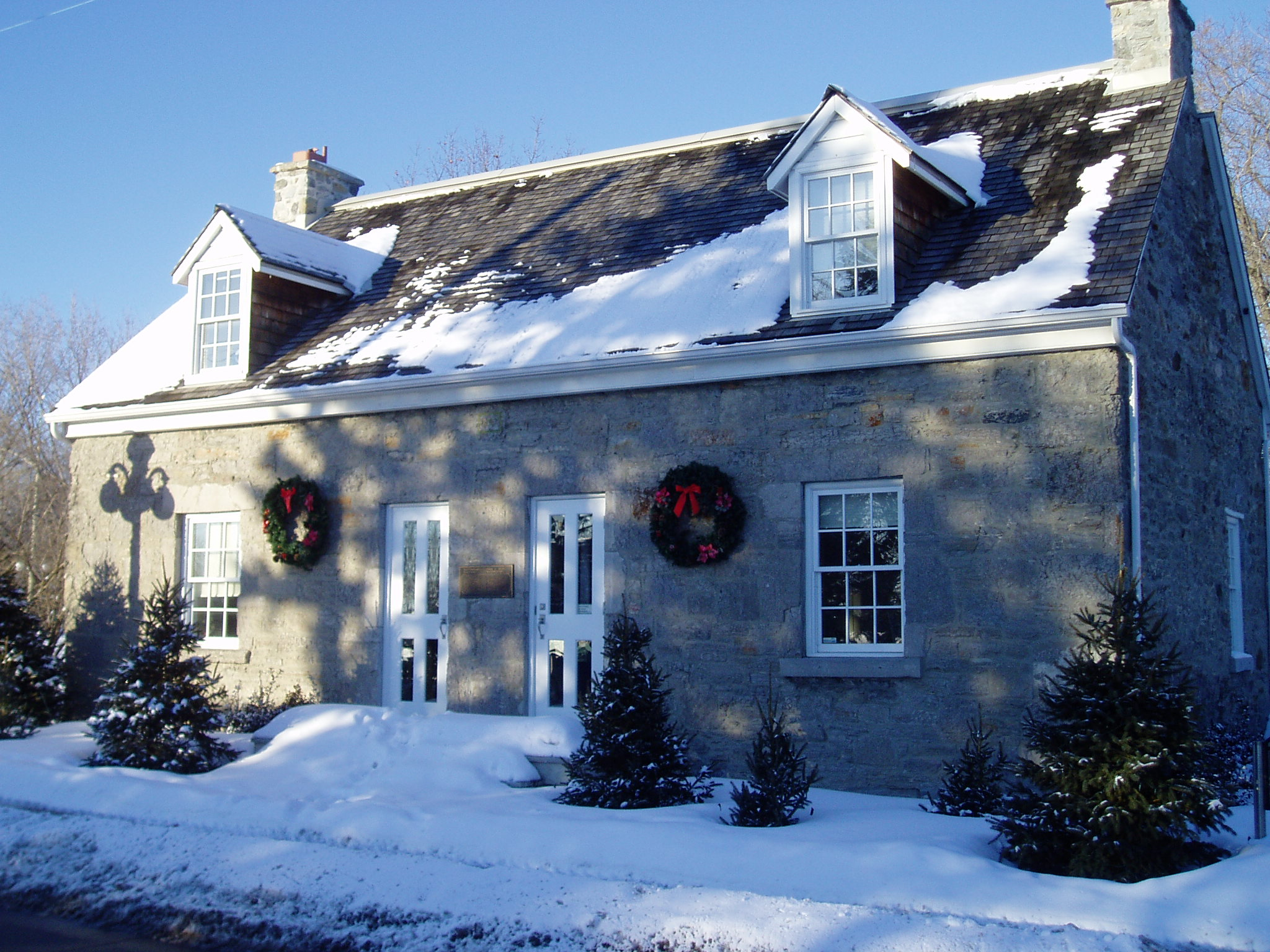
The Frasier Schoolhouse, built in 1837, is one of the few buildings left from the village's early history.

New Edinburgh was founded by Thomas McKay, one of the builders of the Rideau Canal lock system. He bought the land at the junction of the Ottawa and Rideau Rivers in 1829 and created a village named for Edinburgh in his native Scotland. Often pronounced as rhyming with "Pittsburgh", the traditional pronunciation would be 'New Edinburrah' owing to McKay's Scottish heritage. The streets in the neighbourhood were named after McKay's family. Crichton was his wife's maiden name, Keefer his son in law, while Thomas, John, and Charles were his sons. The area was originally largely industrial, home to a number of mills using the power of the river. Originally part of Gloucester Township, New Edinburgh was incorporated as a separate village in 1866 by a special act of parliament, but was annexed in 1887 by Ottawa.

In August 2000, The School of Dance moved into its building in New Edinburgh where the old Crichton Street Public School was situated.

New Edinburgh has their own local community newspaper, New Edinburgh News, assisted by many of the locals.

== Churches ==
- MacKay United Church
- St. Bartholomew's Anglican Church
- St. John's Evangelical Lutheran Church
- St. Luke Evangelical Lutheran Church

== Parks ==
- New Edinburgh Park
- Rideau Falls Park
- Stanley Park

== See also ==
- List of Ottawa neighbourhoods
