= Evil Under the Sun =

1941 mystery novel by Agatha Christie

- Dust-jacket illustration of the first UK edition
- Author: Agatha Christie
- Language: English
- Series: Hercule Poirot
- Genre: Crime
- Publisher: Collins Crime Club
- Publication date: June 1941
- Publication place: United Kingdom
- Media type: Print (hardback & paperback)
- Pages: 256 (First edition, hardback)
- Preceded by: One, Two, Buckle My Shoe
- Followed by: Five Little Pigs

Evil Under the Sun is a mystery novel by British writer Agatha Christie, first published in the UK by the Collins Crime Club in June 1941 and in the US by Dodd, Mead and Company in October of the same year.

The novel features Christie's detective, Hercule Poirot, who takes a holiday in Devon. During his stay, he notices a young woman who is flirtatious and attractive, but not well liked by a number of guests. When she is murdered during his stay, he finds himself drawn into investigating the circumstances surrounding the murder.

== Plot summary ==
Hercule Poirot takes a quiet holiday at a secluded hotel in Devon, and notices attractive former actress Arlena Marshall flirting with Patrick Redfern, despite the fact both of them are married to other people. One morning, Arlena heads out for a private rendezvous at Pixy Cove; everyone initially assumes she has gone to meet Redfern, but he emerges from the hotel looking for her moments later. He and Miss Emily Brewster row around the island and find Arlena lying dead. A later examination by the local police surgeon reveals she has been strangled.

Both Poirot and the investigating officer, Inspector Colgate, interview the possible suspects about their movements during the morning. Poirot learns that Emily Brewster was nearly hit by a bottle thrown from one of the guest rooms, while the hotel chambermaid recalls hearing someone running a bath at noon. Poirot also notes the aroma of Arlena's perfume inside a hidden cave near Pixy Cove.

Looking for similar cases, Poirot learns of the strangulation of Alice Corrigan; she was found by a local teacher, at a time for which her husband Edward had an alibi. Poirot is supplied with a photo of both Corrigan and the teacher; later, he invites most of his suspects to a picnic, at which he secretly observes their behaviour and tests their reaction to heights. Following the picnic, Arlena's stepdaughter Linda attempts suicide with Christine Redfern's sleeping pills. Poirot reveals that Linda has been experimenting with voodoo, and believed her "spells" killed her stepmother, whom she hated and mistrusted.

Bringing together the suspects, Poirot denounces Patrick and Christine Redfern for Arlena's murder. Arlena had been killed to prevent her husband from learning that Patrick had conned most of her fortune away. The murder was well-planned to falsify the time of death; while Christine was at Gull Cove with Linda, she set Linda's watch forward twenty minutes, asked for the time to set her alibi, then returned the watch to the correct time. Afterwards, Christine returned to her room and applied fake suntan makeup, which she concealed from sight, before tossing the bottle out the window, where it inadvertently landed right next to Miss Brewster. Sneaking down to Pixy Cove via a long ladder the hotel had fixed there for tourists, Christine made certain Arlena saw her; Patrick had instructed Arlena to hide should his wife turn up before their rendezvous. Once Arlena was deep in the cave, Christine impersonated the dead body to fool Brewster, who immediately left to get help while Patrick remained behind. After Brewster's departure, Christine rushed back to the hotel to remove the makeup. Patrick then called an unsuspecting Arlena out and strangled her.

Poirot reveals that Christine lied about having a fear of heights, as she easily traversed a suspended bridge during the picnic. Linda's attempt at suicide was also provoked by Christine. As further proof, Poirot reveals that the photo from the Surrey Police identifies Patrick as Edward Corrigan, who killed his wife Alice, and Christine as the teacher who evidently claimed to have found the body before the murder actually had been committed. With the case closed, Poirot reassures Linda she did not kill Arlena and predicts she "will not hate (her) next step-mother", as her father has rekindled a romance with his childhood sweetheart.

== Characters ==
- Hercule Poirot, famous Belgian detective known for his magnificent moustache as well as his "little grey cells".
- Colonel Weston, Chief Constable.
- Inspector Colgate, investigating officer.
- Sergeant Phillips, policeman.
- Dr Neasden, police surgeon.
- Captain Kenneth Marshall, in his 40s, Arlena's husband, responsible, proud.
- Arlena Stuart Marshall, actress until a year earlier, Kenneth's wife for the last four years.
- Linda Marshall, Kenneth's 16-year-old daughter.
- Patrick Redfern, Christine's husband.
- Christine Redfern, Patrick's wife, tall and pretty "in a washed out way".
- Rosamund Darnley, fashionable dressmaker, Kenneth Marshall's long-ago sweetheart.
- Emily Brewster, athletic spinster, rows daily.
- Carrie Gardener, a garrulous American tourist.
- Odell Gardener, Carrie's patient American husband.
- Horace Blatt, large and too loud, avoided by everyone.
- Reverend Stephen Lane, who calls Arlena Marshall "evil through and through".
- Major Barry, retired officer, talks endlessly about India.
- Gladys Narracott, chambermaid in the Jolly Roger Hotel.
- Mrs Castle, owner of the Jolly Roger Hotel.

== Literary significance and reception ==
The verdict by Maurice Willson Disher in The Times Literary Supplement of 14 June 1941 was positive: "To maintain a place at the head of detective-writers would be difficult enough without the ever increasing rivalry. Even Miss Christie cannot stay there unchallenged though she has a following which will swear her books are best without reading the others. Unbiased opinion may have given the verdict against her last season when new arrivals set a very hot pace; but Evil Under the Sun will take a lot of beating now." After summarising the plot, Disher concluded: "Miss Christie casts the shadow of guilt upon first one and then another with such casual ease that it is difficult for the reader not to be led by the nose. Everybody is well aware that any character most strongly indicated is not a likely criminal; yet this guiding principle is forgotten when Miss Christie persuades you that you are more discerning than you really are. Then she springs her secret like a land-mine."

In The New York Times Book Review of 19 October 1941, Isaac Anderson wrote, "The murder is an elaborately planned affair – a little too much so for credibility, in view of the many possibilities of a slip-up somewhere along the way – but Poirot's reasoning is flawless, as it always is. Evil Under the Sun adds another to the already long list of Agatha Christie's successful mystery tales."

Maurice Richardson in a short review in the 8 June 1941 issue of The Observer said, "Best Agatha Christie since Ten Little Niggers – and one can't say much more than that – Evil Under the Sun has luxury summer hotel, closed-circle setting, Poirot in white trousers. Victim: redhead actress man-mad. Smashing solution, after clouds of dust thrown in your eyes, ought to catch you right out. Light as a soufflé."

The Scotsman of 3 July 1941 spoke of the "surprising discoveries" in the book's solution and said, "All of these the reader may best be left to encounter for himself in the assurance that the quest will prove as piquant as any this skilful writer has offered."

E.R. Punshon in The Guardian of 26 August 1941 briefly summed up the plot in a eulogistic piece which began, "Is it going too far to call Mrs. Agatha Christie one of the most remarkable writers of the day?"

Robert Barnard: "The classic Christie marital triangle plot set in West Country seaside resort, with particular play on the alikeness of sunbathing bodies, and dead ones. Possibly overingenious and slightly uncharacterised."

== References to other works ==
The plot is taken from the short story "The Blood-Stained Pavement". There are also some vague similarities to the Christie short story "Triangle at Rhodes", which was first published in the US in This Week magazine in February 1936 and in the UK in issue 545 of the Strand Magazine in May 1936, and included in the collection Murder in the Mews (US title: Dead Man's Mirror) one year later.

The character of Colonel Weston had originally appeared in Peril at End House and makes reference to that case upon his first appearance, in Chapter 5. Minor character Mrs Gardener is herself an admirer of Poirot's exploits and refers to the case of Death on the Nile in Chapter 1 of this novel.

The title refers to Ecclesiastes 6:1, which reads, "There is an evil that I have seen under the sun, and it lies heavy upon humankind." (New Revised Standard Version of the Bible) Ecclesiastes 6:2 continues, "those to whom God gives wealth, possessions, and honor, so that they lack nothing of all that they desire, yet God does not enable them to enjoy these things, but a stranger enjoys them. This is vanity; it is a grievous ill."

== Media adaptations ==
=== Radio ===
John Moffatt starred as Poirot in a 1998 five-part BBC Radio 4 adaptation directed by Enyd Williams with a cast that included Iain Glen as Patrick Redfern, Fiona Fullerton as Arlena Marshall, Robin Ellis as Captain Marshall, Wendy Craig as Mrs Gardener, George Baker as Colonel Weston, and Joan Littlewood as Miss Brewster.

=== 1982 film ===
The novel was adapted into a film in 1982, and was the second film to star Peter Ustinov as Poirot, after his debut in the same role in the 1978 film Death on the Nile. His co-stars included Maggie Smith, Diana Rigg, Denis Quilley, Roddy McDowall, James Mason, and Sylvia Miles.

=== Television ===
==== Agatha Christie's Poirot ====
An adaptation of the novel was made for Agatha Christie's Poirot in 2001, starring David Suchet as Hercule Poirot. Filming for this episode mainly took place at the Burgh Island Hotel, Devon, a location which was inspiration for the original novel and And Then There Were None.

==== French adaptation ====
The novel was adapted as a 2019 episode of the French television series Les Petits Meurtres d'Agatha Christie.

=== Video game ===
On 17 October 2007, The Adventure Company released a PC game adaptation of the book, which features actor Kevin Delaney as Hercule Poirot. This version includes the character of Captain Hastings as the player-character; as a game, Poirot re-creates the story, but allows Hastings to step into Poirot's shoes and solve the mystery as he would.

== Publication history ==
- 1941, Collins Crime Club (London), June 1941, Hardback, 256 pp, price (before decimalisation) 7/6
- 1941, Dodd Mead and Company (New York), October 1941, Hardback, 260 pp, price $2.00
- 1945, Pocket Books (New York), Paperback, 183 pp (Pocket number 285)
- 1957, Fontana Books (Imprint of HarperCollins), Paperback, 189 pp
- 1963, Pan Books, Paperback, 217 pp
- 1971, Ulverscroft Large-print Edition, Hardcover, 362 pp
- 2008, Poirot Facsimile Edition (Facsimile of 1941 UK First Edition), HarperCollins, 1 April 2008, Hardback; ISBN 0-00-727455-6
- 2011, Hercule Poirot Mysteries series (Book 23), William Morrow Paperbacks, 30 August 2011, trade paper ISBN 978-0062073938

The book was first serialised in the US in Collier's Weekly in eleven parts from 14 December 1940 (Volume 106, Number 24) to 22 February 1941 (Volume 107, Number 8) with illustrations by Mario Cooper.

== References in other media ==
- In The Martian, a novel by Andy Weir, protagonist Mark Watney spends Sol 482 reading Evil Under the Sun, incorrectly believing Linda Marshall is the murderer.
