= Bigbury-on-Sea =

Village in Devon, England

Coordinates: 50.284037°N 3.894722°W

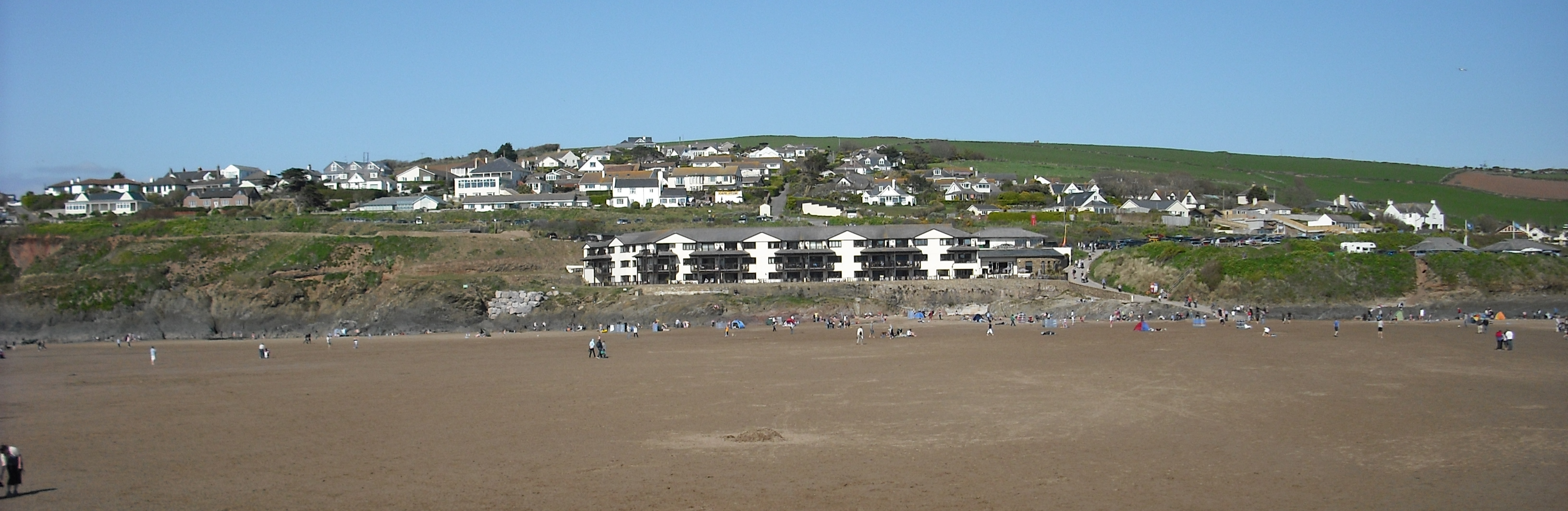
- View of Bigbury-on-Sea from Burgh Island

- Location within Devon
- OS grid reference: SX650443
  - London: 185 miles (298 km)
- Civil parish: Bigbury
- District: South Hams
- Shire county: Devon
- Region: South West
- Country: England
- Sovereign state: United Kingdom
- Police: Devon and Cornwall
- Fire: Devon and Somerset
- Ambulance: South Western
- UK Parliament: South West Devon

Bigbury-on-Sea is a village in the South Hams district on the south coast of Devon, England. It is part of the civil parish of Bigbury which is centred on a small village of that name about a mile inland. At the 2021 census, the parish had a population of 564, which was slightly more than the 500 recorded at the 2011 census. Bigbury-on-Sea village is on the coast above the largest sandy beach in South Devon facing south to Bigbury Bay. The tidal island of Burgh Island lies about 270 yards (250 metres) offshore.

At the start of the 20th century Bigbury-on-Sea consisted of a few fishermen's cottages with fish cellars. The village grew with the growth in holidaymaking and now has a beach cafe, and by the mainland side of causeway is the Burgh Island Causeway resort built in 1998 replacing the burnt out fishermen's cottages after a controversial planning application. The resort is made up of privately owned and holiday let flats and a private leisure club with indoor pool and gym. The Devon Coastal Path runs behind the resort.

The large sandy beach is very popular for wave and wind based water sports, but it lost its Blue Flag beach status in 2012 due to water quality issues.

There are two large car parks with easy access to the beaches and the walk across the sand bar to Burgh Island with its Art Deco Hotel and Pilchard Inn. When the tide covers the sand bar access is by the sea tractor.

As of March 2020, 63% of properties in the village were holiday-lets or second homes.
