= Burgh Island =

Tidal island on the coast of South Devon in England

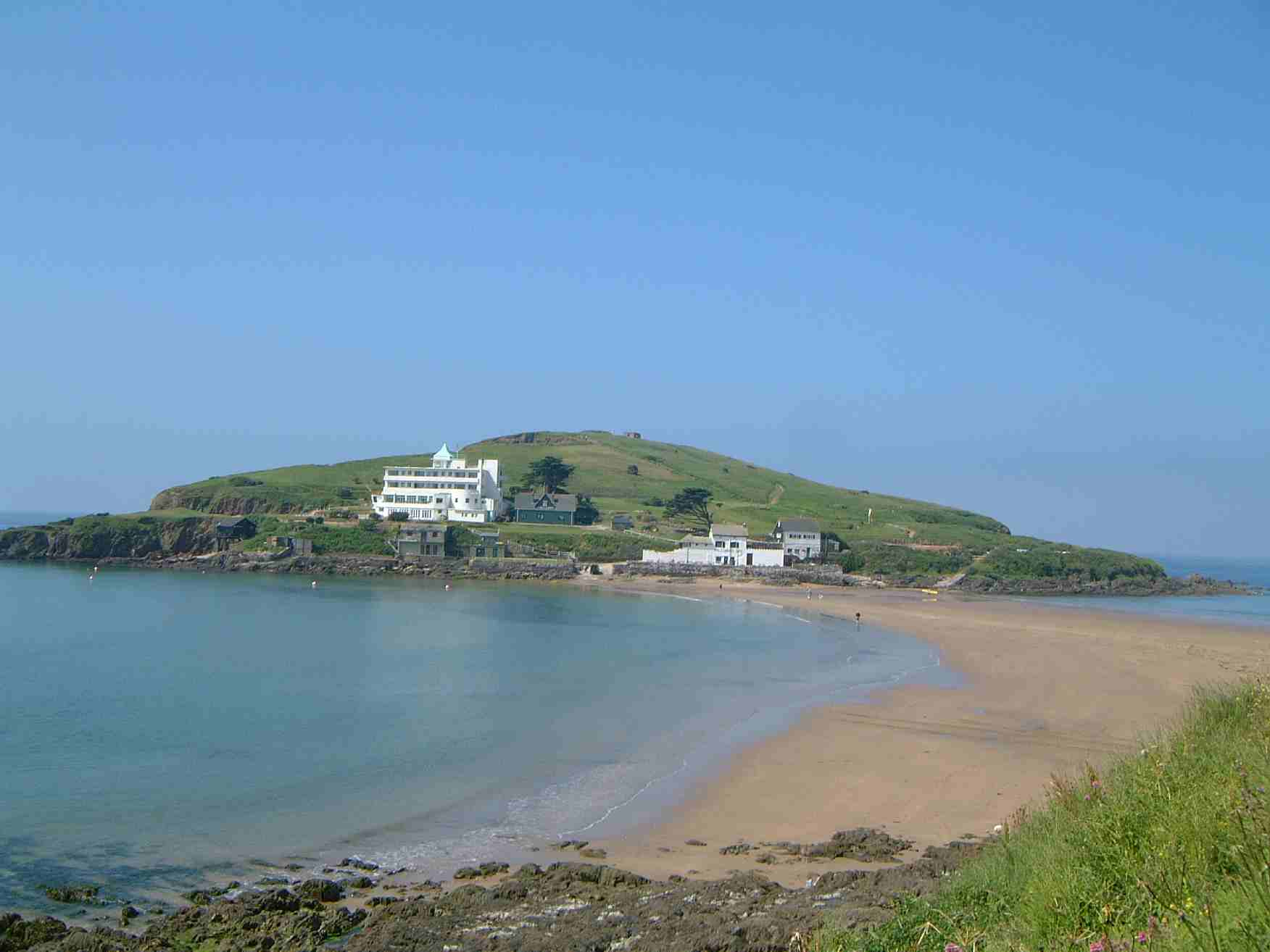
- View from Bigbury-on-Sea

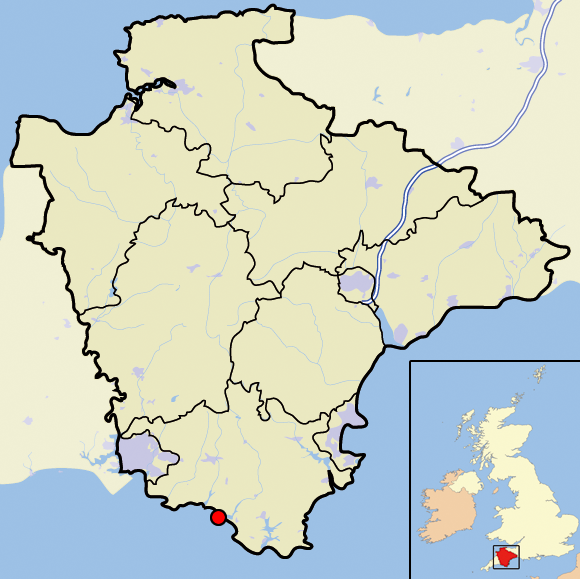

Geography
- Location: English Channel
- Coordinates: 50°16′47″N 3°54′01″W

Administration
- United Kingdom
- Constituent country: England
- Shire county: Devon
- Shire district: South Hams

Additional information
- NB: Burgh Island is a tidal island

Burgh Island is a tidal island on the coast of South Devon in England near the small seaside village Bigbury-on-Sea. There are several buildings on the island, the largest being the Art Deco Burgh Island Hotel. The other buildings are three private houses, and a pub, the Pilchard Inn, parts of which date to the 14th century. The island is strongly associated with writer Agatha Christie, who often visited and used the island and its hotel as a setting and inspiration for two famous novels: And Then There Were None (1939) and Evil Under the Sun (1941).

== History ==
Archaeological discovery of tin ingots at the River Erme estuary wreck show that the local area was a significant tin trading port in ancient times; it is unclear whether the ingots date from the Iron Age or Sub-Roman periods, however this discovery so close to Burgh Island has drawn comparisons with Diodorus Siculus's 1st century BCE text, more often associated with St Michael's Mount in Cornwall:

At this time we shall treat of the tin which is dug from the ground. Those who dwell near Belerium, one of the headlands of Britain, are especially fond of strangers, and on account of their trade with the merchants they have a more civilised manner of living. They collect the tin after the earth has been skillfully forced to yield it. Although the land is stony, it has certain veins of earth from which they melt and purify the metal which has been extracted. After making this into bars they carry it to a certain island near Britain called Ictis. For although the place between is for the most part covered with water, yet in the middle there is dry ground, and over this they carry a great amount of tin in wagons [...] Thence the merchants carry into Gaul the tin which they have bought from the inhabitants. And after a journey of thirty days on foot through Gaul, they convey their packs carried by horses to the mouths of the Rhone River.

The island has been known by various names over the years. Early records and maps mention it as St Michael's Island. The name later changed to Borough Island, eventually shortened to Burgh. As late as 1947 an Ordnance Survey map refers to the island as Borough Island. In 1908 a postcard produced by Stengel & Co Ltd of London referred to it as Burr Island. A map published in 1765 shows "Borough or Bur Isle".

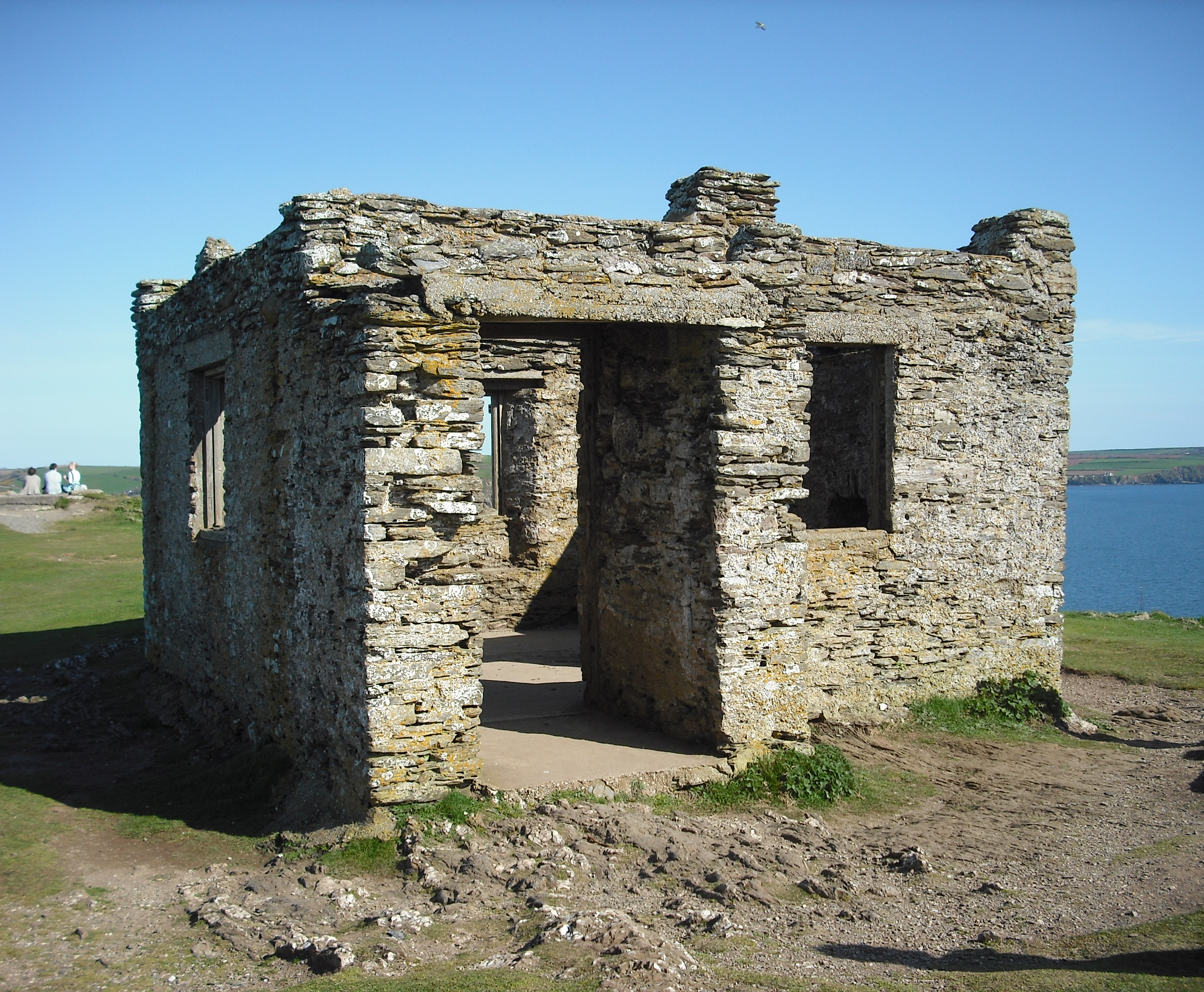
The remains of the former huers' hut

It is believed a monastery was established on the island, most of the remains of which may lie beneath the current hotel. The ancient Pilchard Inn's history dates to 1336 and may have started life as the guest lodgings for the monastery.

A small, possibly transient, population of fishermen occupied the island following the dissolution of the monastery, specialising in pilchard fishing. There are the remains of a chapel atop the island, which later became a "huers' hut" — a place where fishermen would make a hue and cry call to inform other fishermen of shoals of pilchards. During this period, smuggling, wrecking, and piracy were common, benefiting from a natural barrier for half the day.

Fear that German landing forces might use the island as a beachhead during World War II resulted in the area's fortification with anti-tank defences and two pillboxes, positioned on both sides of the causeway. An observation post was also established on the summit to monitor the coastline.

A beach house was built for Agatha Christie as a writer's retreat and still exists on the island. The original structure was built in the 1930s, the elevated, cedar-clad house sits on pillars just above a pebble beach on the western side of the island.

== The hotel ==
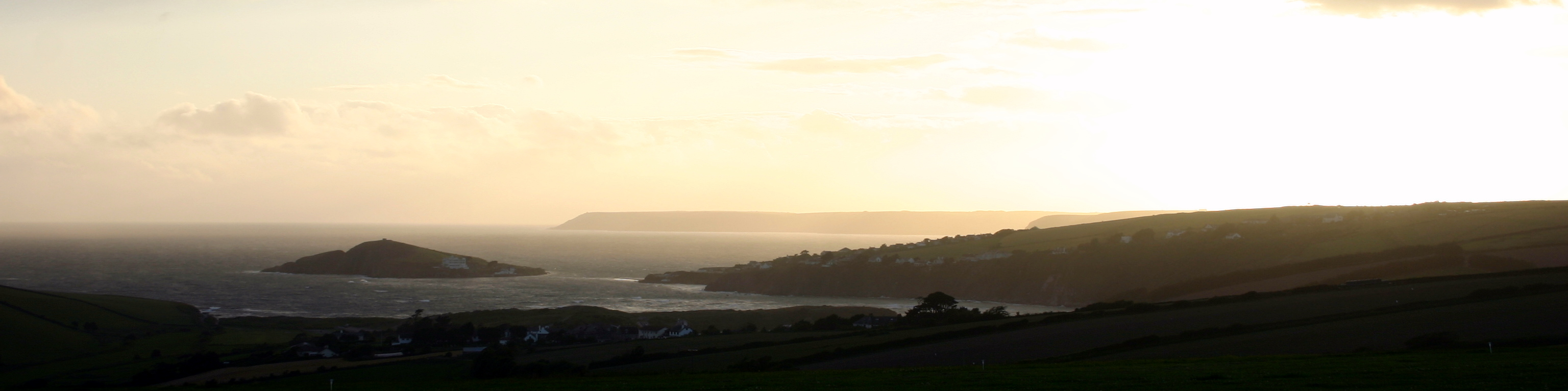
Burgh Island at sunset, viewed from Thurlestone

Burgh Island is well-known today as the location of a restored 1930s Art Deco-style hotel.

== Notable setting and visitors ==
Burgh Island is closely linked to Agatha Christie, as it served as the inspirational setting for Soldier Island (And Then There Were None) and for the setting of the Hercule Poirot mystery Evil Under the Sun. The 2002 TV adaptation of Evil Under The Sun used the island as a filming location. In 1994 an episode of the television series Lovejoy was set and filmed on the island, entitled Somewhere - Over the Rainbow? Several scenes from the BBC's 1987 dramatisation of Christie's Miss Marple mystery, Nemesis, were also filmed in the hotel.

The hotel, with its Art Deco styling, was also a bolt hole in the 1930s for some of London's rich and famous, including Noël Coward. The hotel has had many other famous visitors, from the Duke and Duchess of Windsor to The Beatles.

The island was also the location for GMTV's Inch-loss Island slimming feature in 2008, as it was for the original series in 2001. The climactic scene of the 1965 British film Catch Us If You Can (featuring The Dave Clark Five) takes place at the island.

English singer-songwriter Ben Howard's 2012 EP was named after the island.

== Transport ==
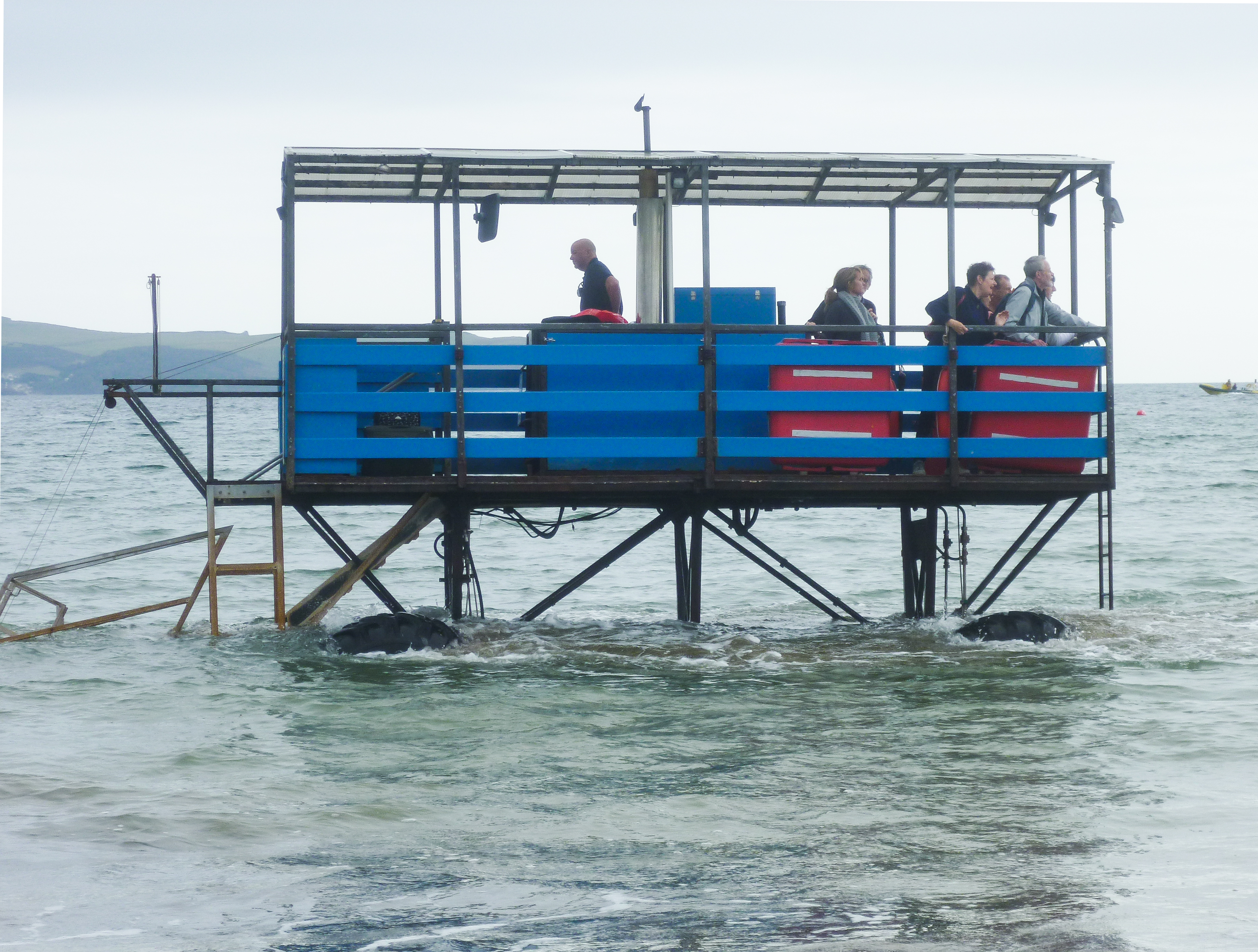
The sea tractor is used to ferry visitors to the island during high tide

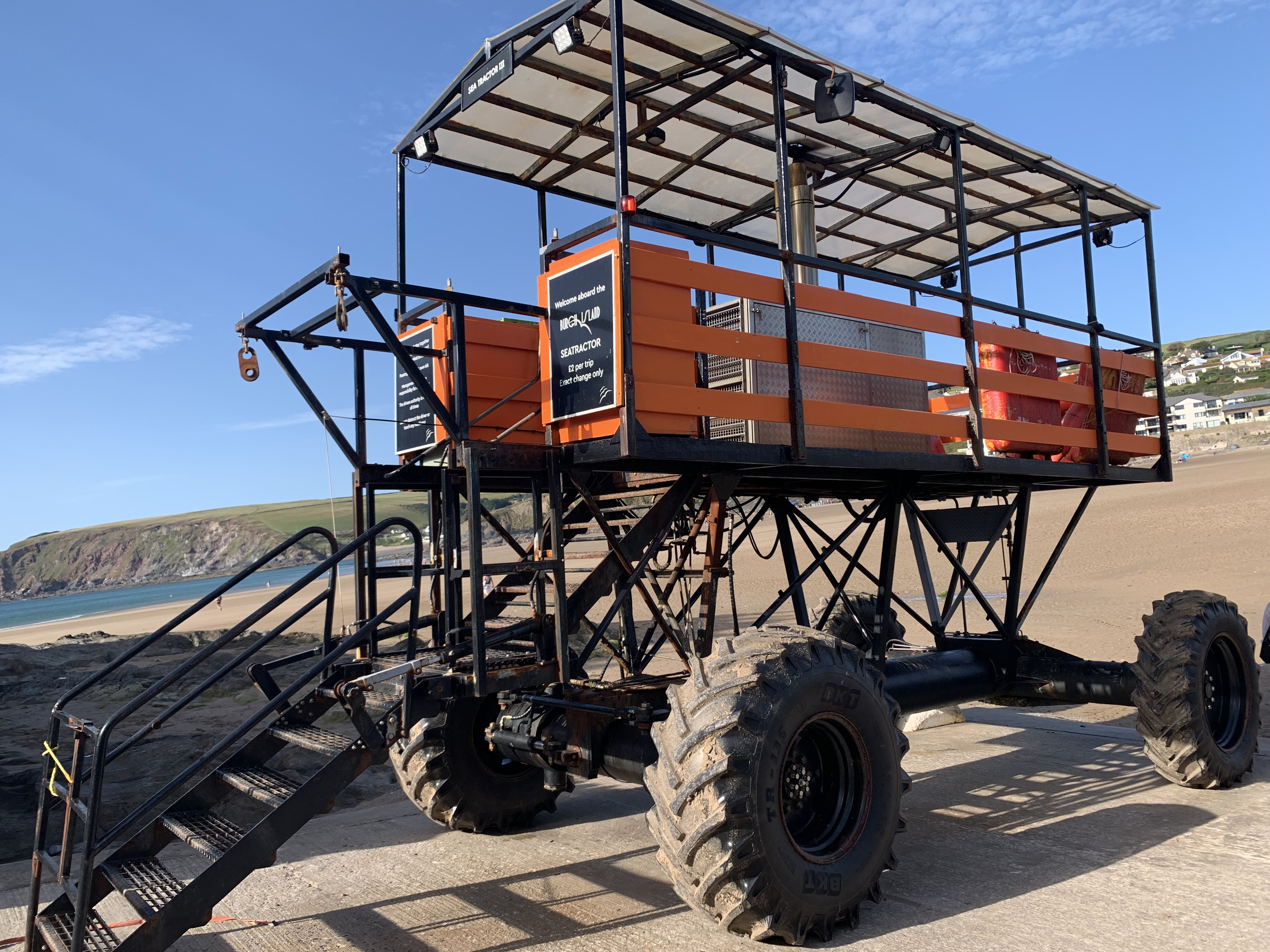
Photograph of the Burgh Island in Devon sea tractor used to move passengers from the mainland to the tidal island.

The island is approximately 270 yards (250 m) from the mainland at Bigbury-on-Sea and is approachable on foot at low tide. At high tide, the sea tractor, which is operated by the hotel, transports passengers back and forth. The original vehicle was constructed in 1930 (see 1933 photo); the current third generation tractor dates from 1969. The vehicle drives across the beach with its wheels underwater on the sandy bottom while its driver and passengers sit on a platform high above. Power from a Fordson tractor engine is relayed to the wheels via hydraulic motors.

== Footpaths ==
The island has an extensive network of footpaths and the owner until 2003 was a keen hiker who welcomed walkers. The new owners, however, erected signs closing footpaths and obtained an exemption from the public "rights to roam" enabled in the Countryside and Rights of Way Act 2000. The exemption was overturned, except for the routes closest to the hotel, in 2006.

== Sale ==
In April 2018, the owners of the island, Deborah Clark and Tony Orchard, announced that the island had been bought by "Project Archie", a joint venture between Bluehone Capital and Marechale Capital, for an undisclosed sum.

In May 2023, the island went up for sale again.
