= Doors Open Ottawa =

Annual event to explore buildings normally closed to the public

Doors Open Ottawa is an annual event held in the City of Ottawa, Ontario, Canada, that gives the public access to many of the city's unique and historically significant buildings. Among the buildings included are government offices, museums, radio stations, places of worship, embassies, and historical landmarks. It is the second-oldest Doors Open event in North America; after Doors Open Toronto.

Admission is free of charge. Doors Open Ottawa has recorded nearly 850,000 visits since it began in 2002.

More than 140 buildings took part in the 2018 event and over 140 buildings were expected to take part in 2019.

Because of the COVID-19 pandemic in Ottawa, Doors Open Ottawa 2020 was cancelled, and the 2021 event was offered virtually. The 2022 event was offered in a hybrid format, with some in-person and some virtual content.

== Recent buildings ==
For 2022 & 2023, V=virtual tour and I=in-person; For 2023, H=Hybrid (both virtual and in-person)

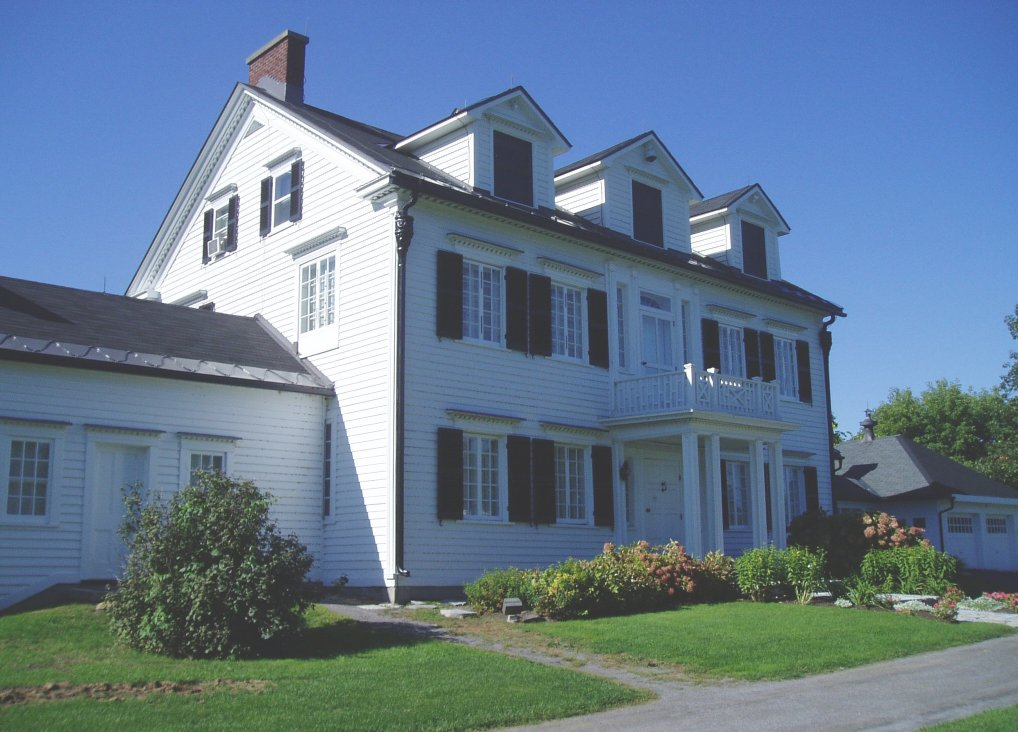
Billings Estate Museum

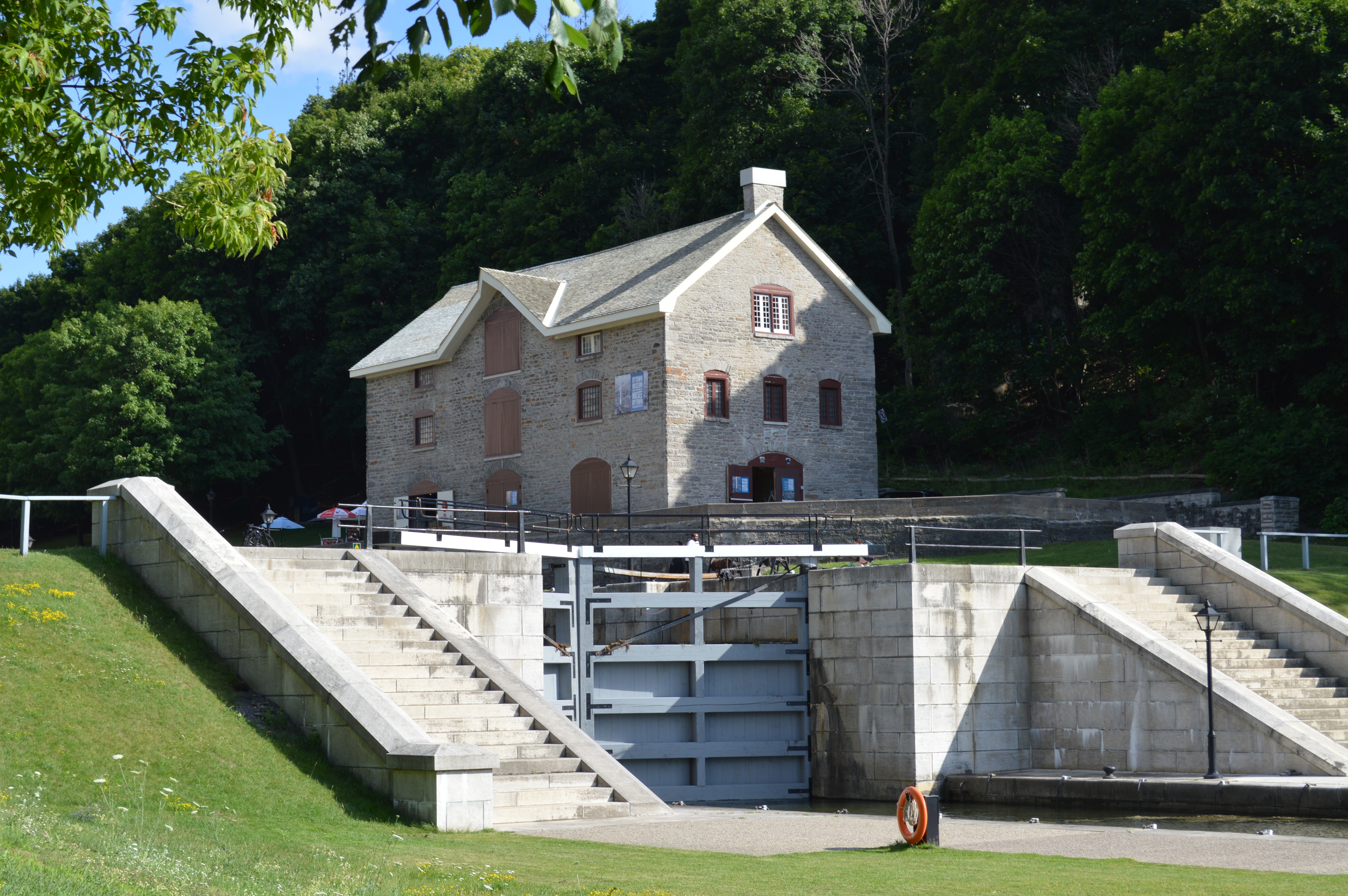
Bytown Museum

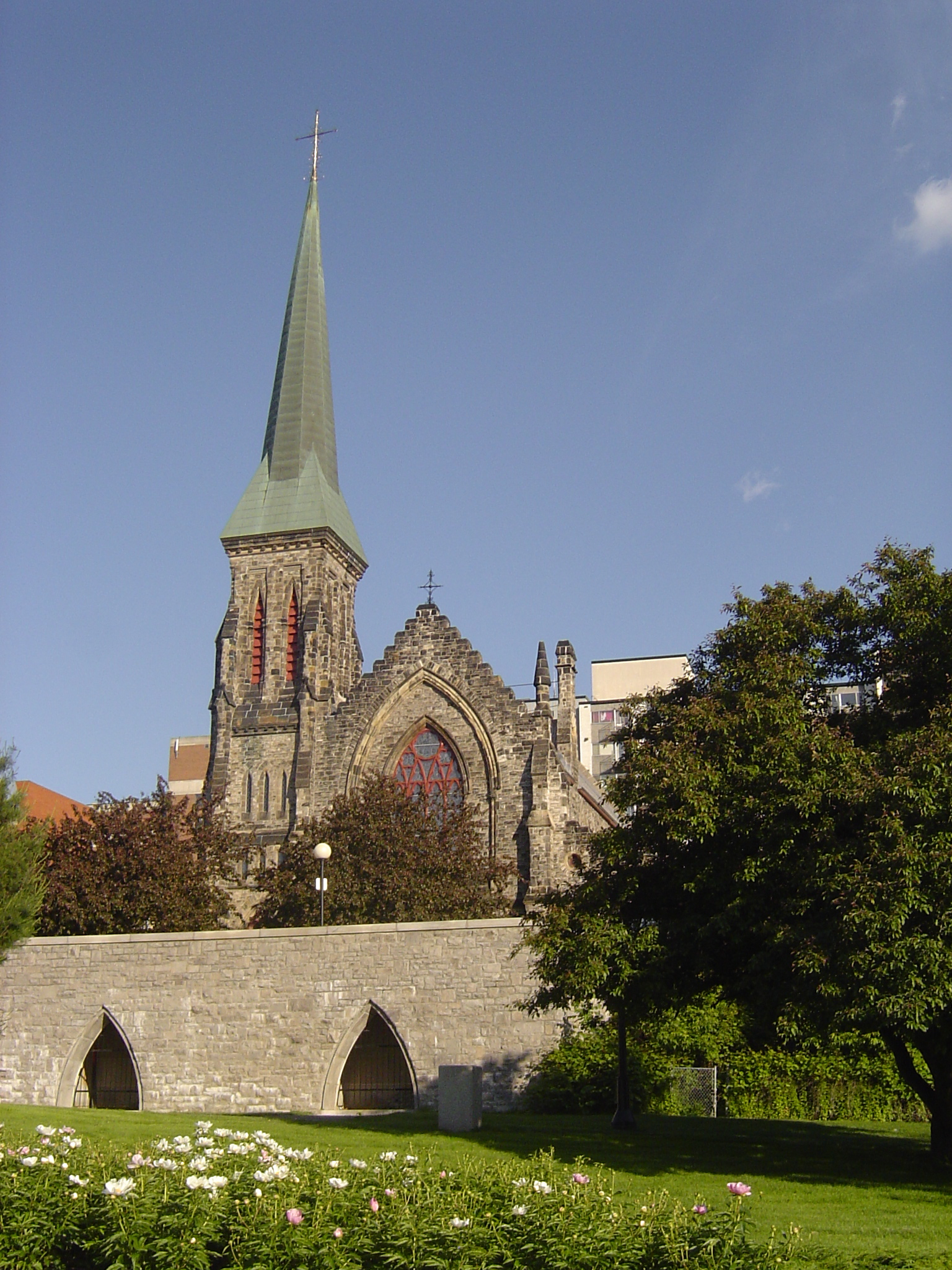
Christ Church Cathedral

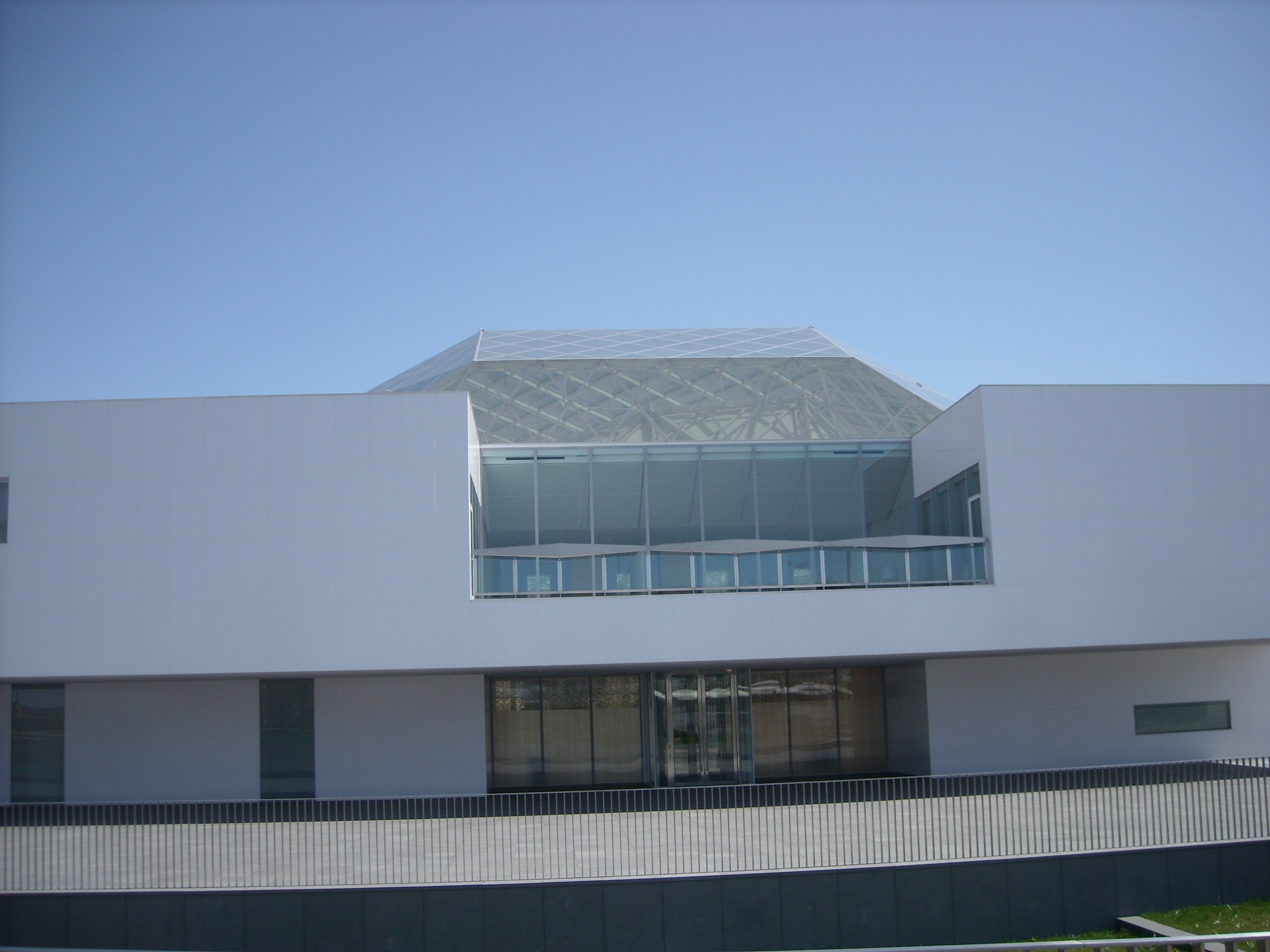
Delegation of the Ismaili Imamat

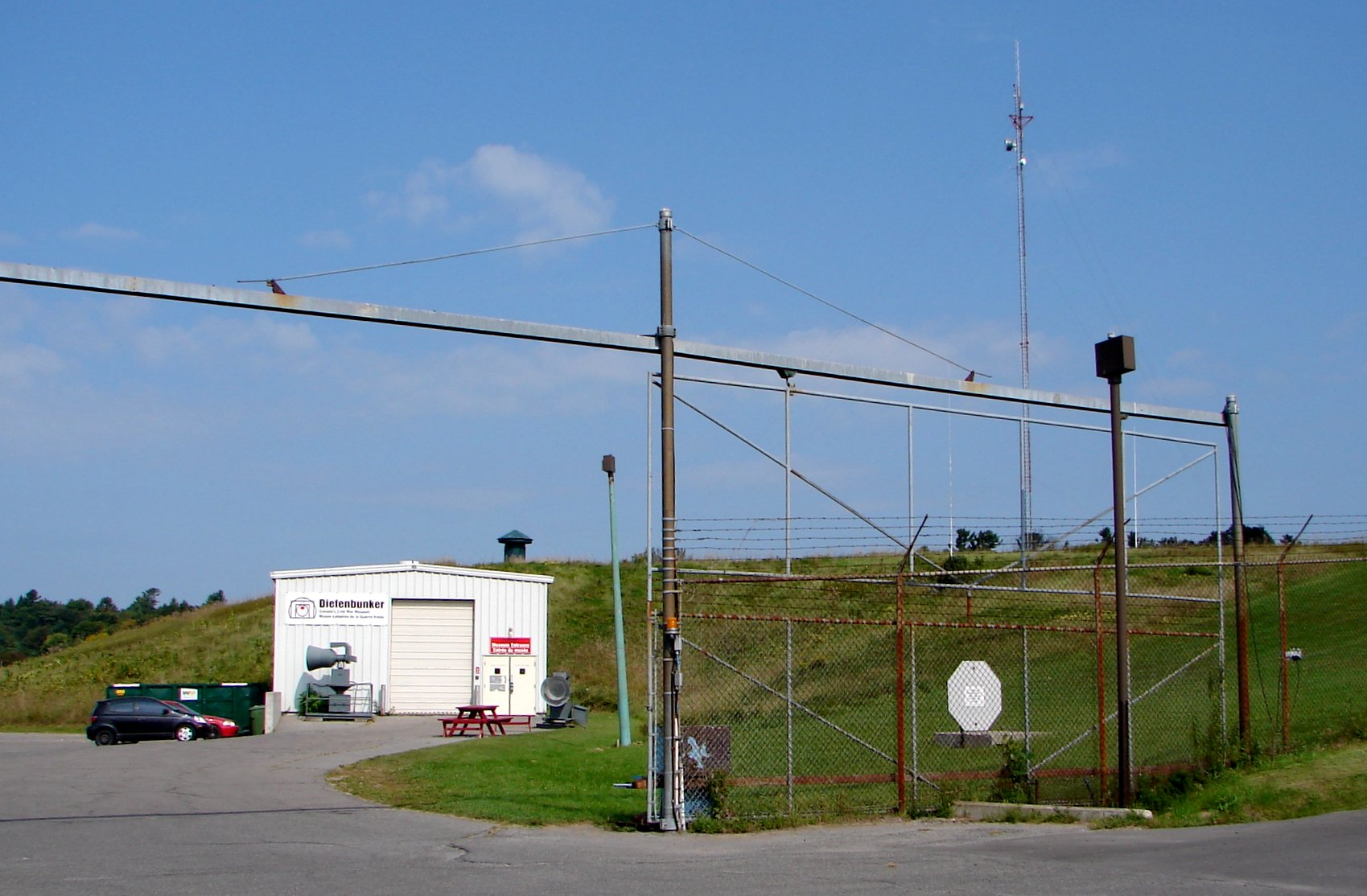
Diefenbunker

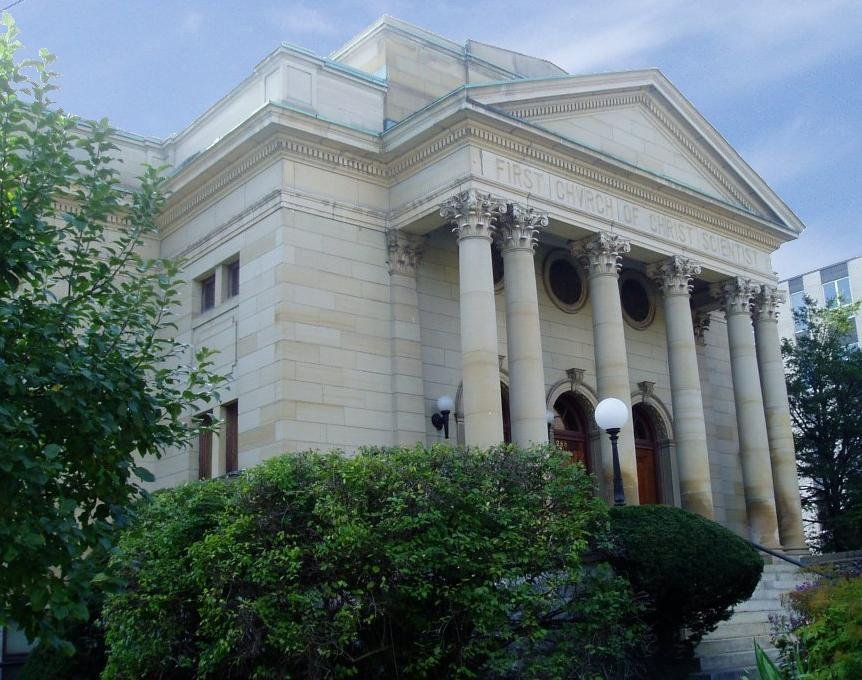
First Church of Christ, Scientist

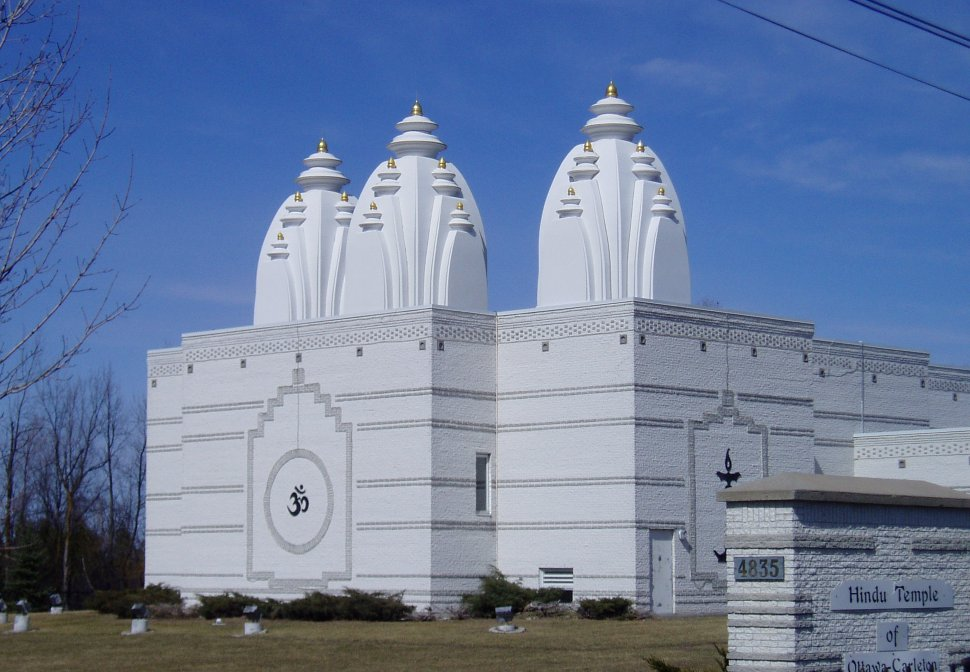
Hindu Temple of Ottawa-Carleton

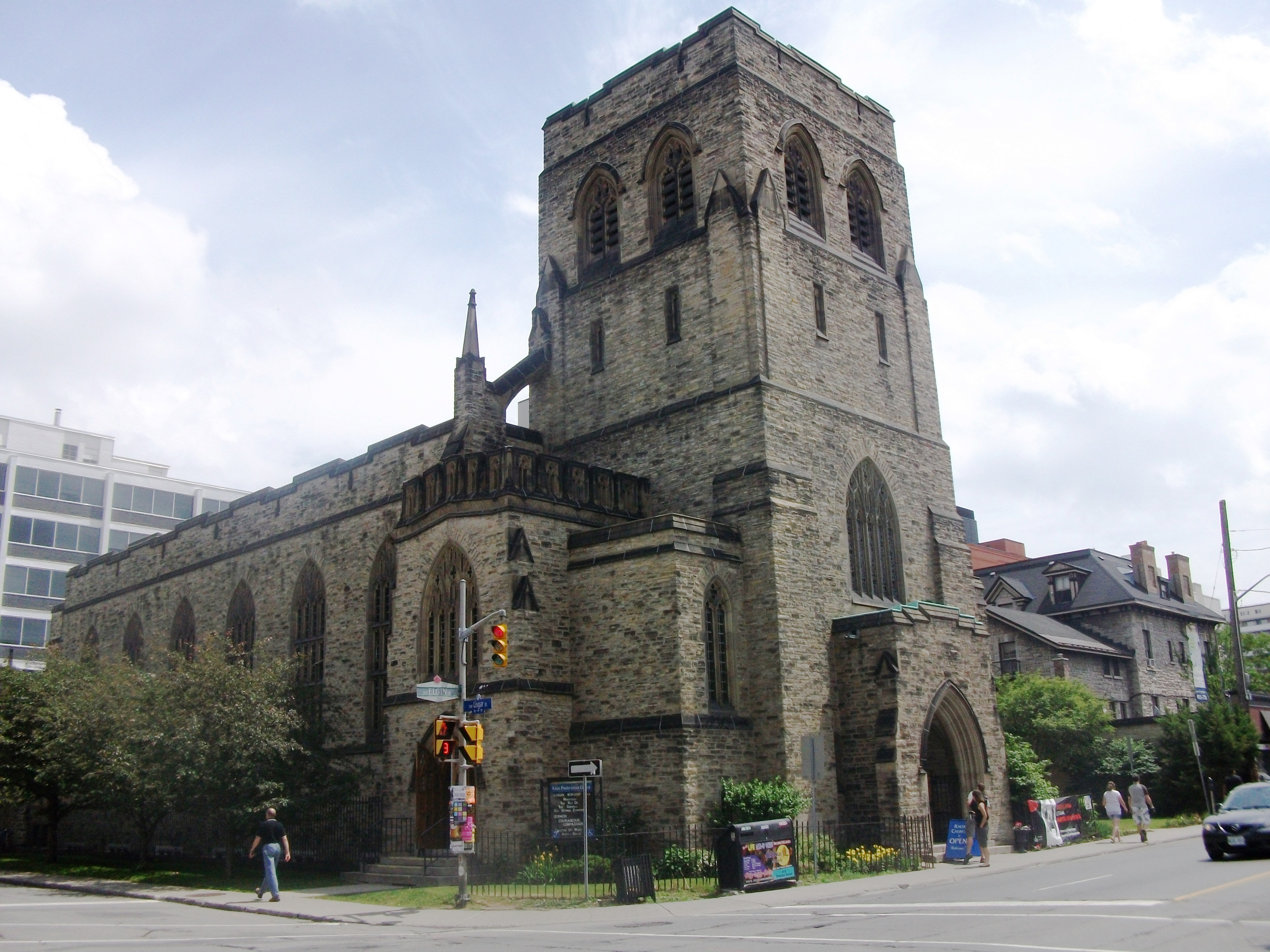
Knox Presbyterian Church

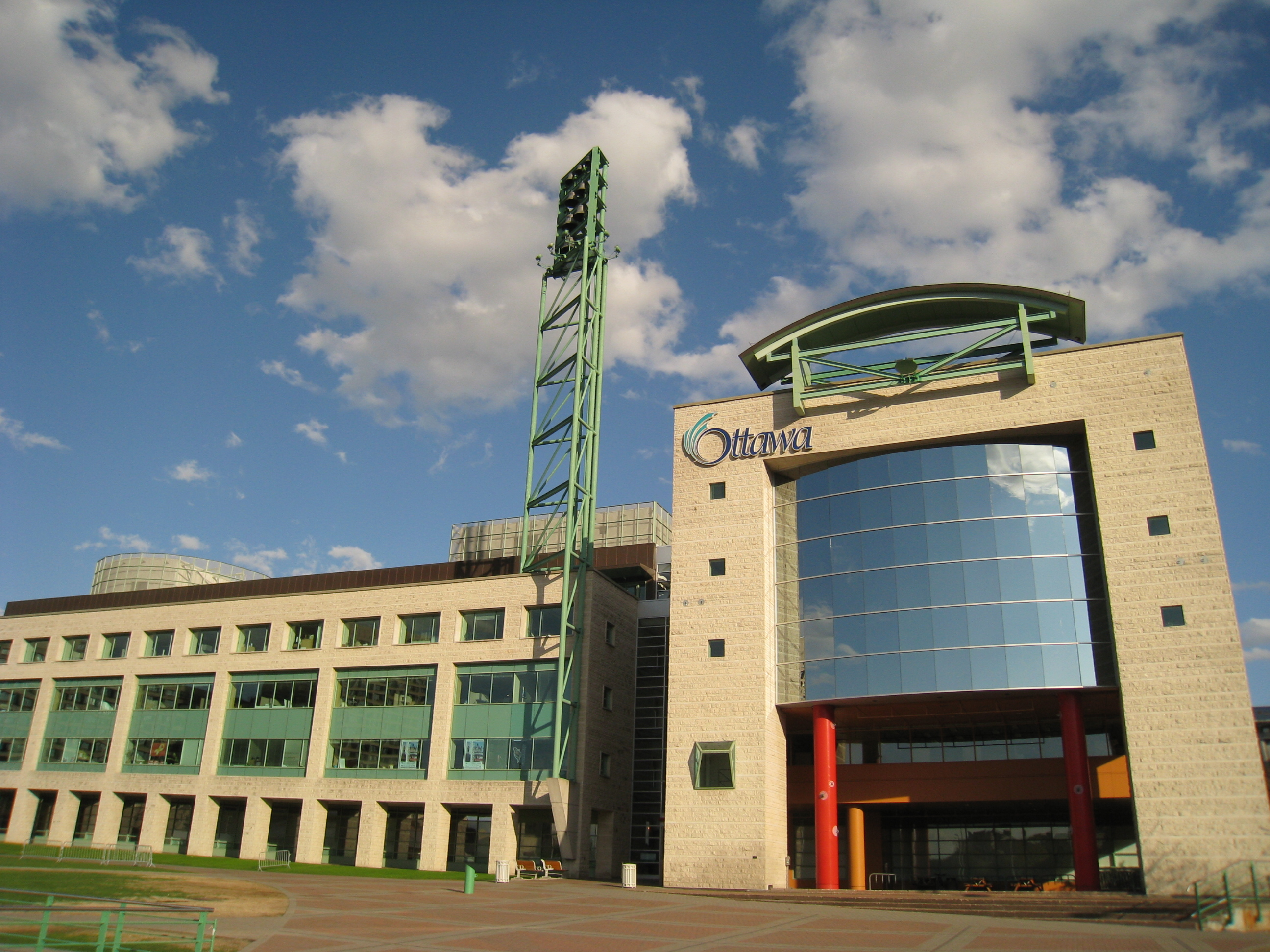
Ottawa City Hall

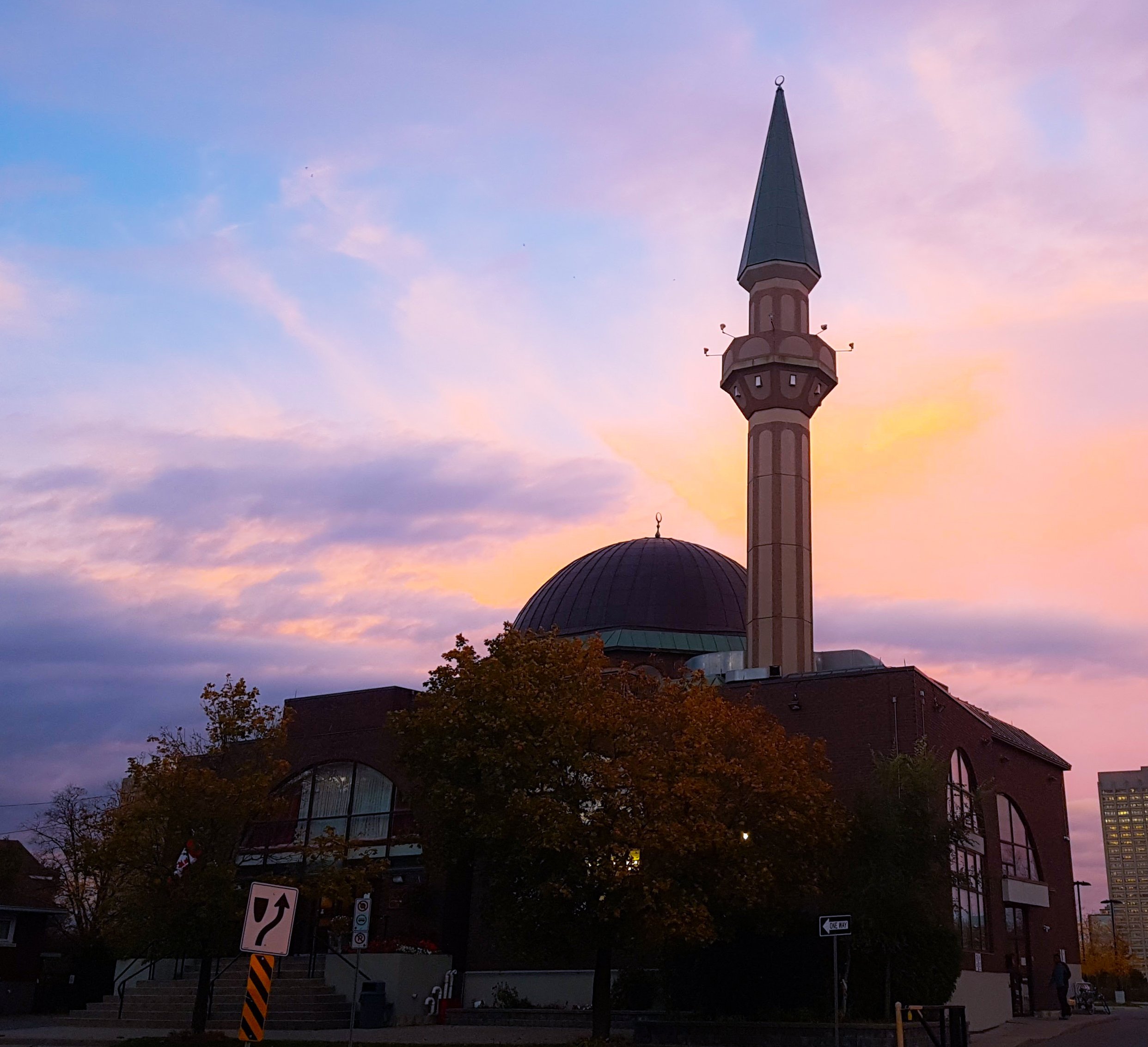
Ottawa Mosque

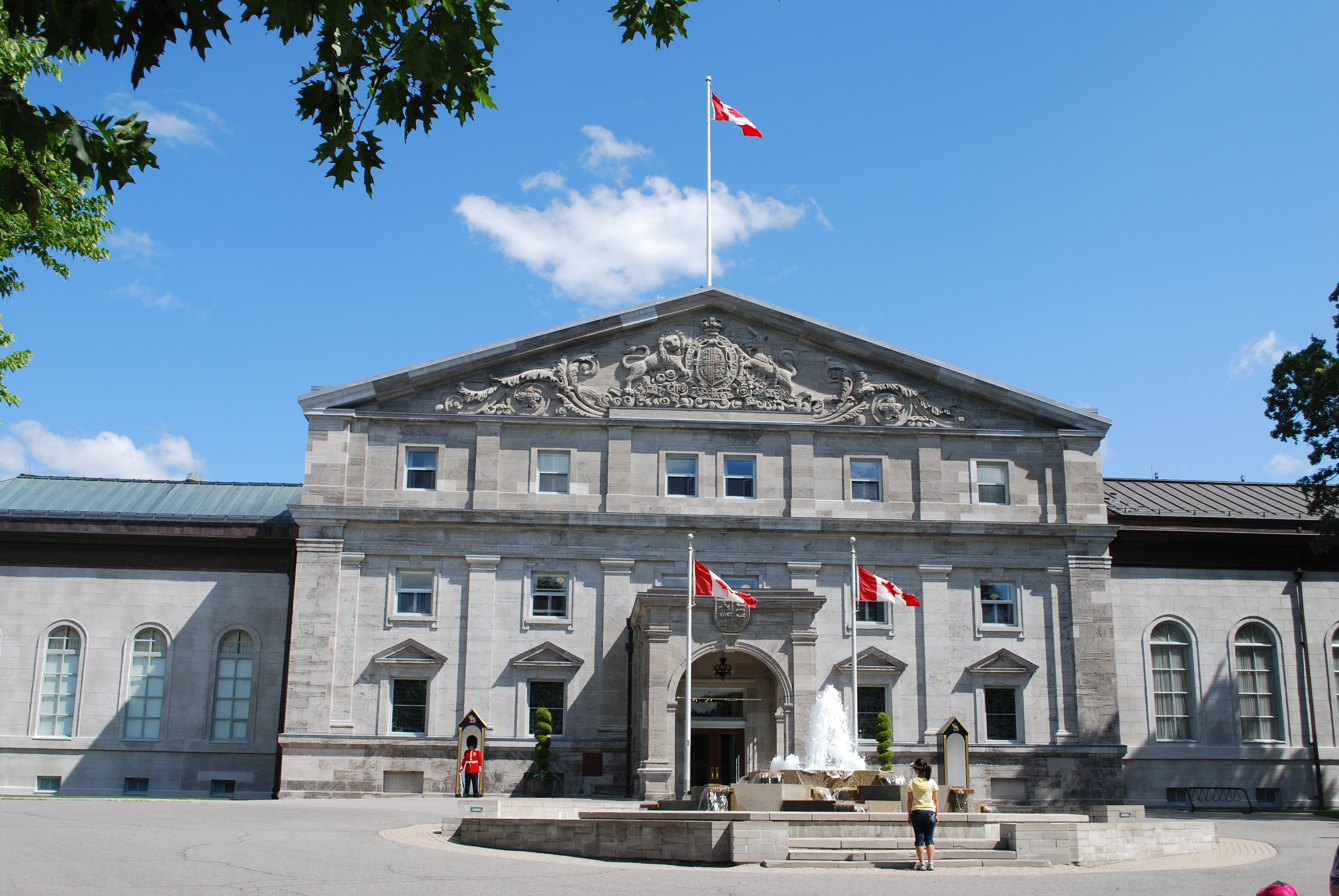
Rideau Hall.

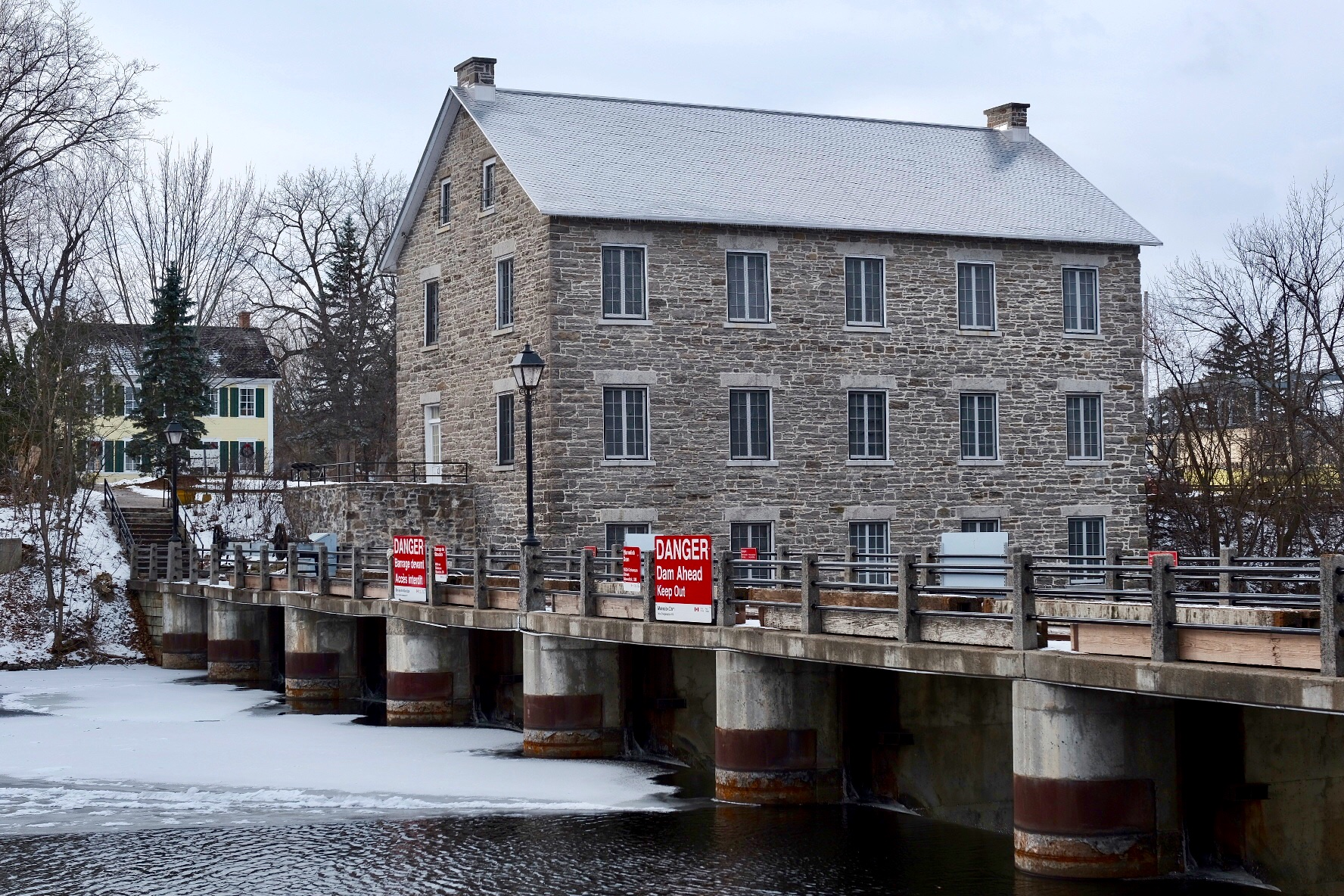
Watson's Mill

Building	2026	2025	2024	2023	2022 (hybrid)	2021 (virtual)	2019	2018	2017	2016	2015	2014	2013	2012	2011
1805 Gaspe; 1805 Gaspe Ave.		X	X												
360-Degree Tour of O-Train Line 1 Blair Station and Lyon Station					V	X									
7 Rideau Gate; 7 Rideau Gate														X	X
Abbotsford House; 950 Bank St.					I				X	X			X		
Advanced Research Complex (ARC), University of Ottawa; 25 Templeton St.	X									X	X				
AIDS Committee of Ottawa (ACO); 19 Main St.	X	X	X	I	I		X	X	X	X	X				
Alex Trebek Alumni Hall; 157 Séraphin-Marion St.										X					
Algonquin Centre for Construction Excellence - Algonquin College; 1408 Woodroffe Ave. (ACCE Building)											X	X	X	X	
Algonquin College DARE District; 1385 Woodroffe Ave., Building C							X								
All Saints Anglican Church, Greely; 7103 Parkway Rd.							X	X							
Allsaints Event Space; 315 Chapel St.	X						X	X	X				X		
Alphonse Rochon House, Jean-Claude Bergeron Art Gallery; 150 St. Patrick St.														X	
Alta Vista Animal Hospital (VCA Canada); 2616 Bank St.								X	X	X	X				
Amberwood Village Golf and Country Club; 54 Springbrook Dr.					I										
AMBICO Ltd. 1120 Cummings Ave.			X	I	I										
Andrew Fleck Child Care Services; 185-195 George St.															X
Andrex House/The National Trust for Canada Headquarters; 190 Bronson Ave.									X		X	X	X		
Annunciation to the Theotokos-Saint Nicholas Orthodox Cathedral; LeBreton St. N.	X	X	X												
Apostolic Nunciature; 724 Manor Ave.														X	
Archives of the University of Ottawa; 100 Marie Curie Pvt., Room 012									X						
Arts Court; 2 Daly Ave.	X	X	X	I	I	X					X	X	X	X	X
Ashbury College; 362 Mariposa Ave.									X	X				X	X
Ayers Building - Rural Ottawa South Support Services; 1128 Mill St.										X	X				
Bank of Canada; 245 Sparks St. / 234 Wellington St.		X					X	X	X						
Barber - Carving & Sculpture Inc. (Smith & Barber - Stone Carving Studio); 1520 Triole St.							X	X	X						
Barry Padolsky Associates Inc. Architects, Mercury Court Building; 377 Dalhousie St., Suite 202							X	X	X	X	X	X	X	X	
Bayview Yards (Innovation Centre); 7 Bayview Station Rd.	X	X	X	H	V	X	X	X	X						
Beaver Barracks; 464 Metcalfe St.														X	X
Beckta Dining & Wine Bar - The Grant House; 150 Elgin St., Unit 100							X	X	X	X					
Beechwood Cemetery; 280 Beechwood Ave.					I		X	X							
Ben Franklin Place - Meridian Theatres @ Centrepointe; 101 Centrepointe Dr.							X								
Bethany Hope Centre; 820 Woodroffe Ave.										X	X	X			
Billings Estate National Historic Site; 2100 Cabot St.	X	X	X		I	X	X	X	X	X	X	X	X	X	X
Blackburn Building; 223 Somerset St.													X	X	X
Blessed Sacrament Church; 194 Fourth Ave.												X	X		
Bridgehead Roastery; 130 Anderson St.								X	X	X	X	X	X		
Britannia Water Purification Plant; 2731 Cassels St.	X	X		I										X	
Britannia Yacht Club; 2777 Cassels St.							X	X	X	X	X	X	X	X	X
British High Commission (Earnscliffe National Historic Site of Canada); 140 Sussex Dr.		X	X	I	I	X	X		X	X	X	X			
ByWard Market Building; 55 ByWard Market Sq.	X	X	X												
Canada Aviation and Space Museum - Reserve Hangar; 11 Aviation Pkwy.								X	X		X				
Canada Council Art Bank; 921 St. Laurent Blvd.	X	X	X	H	V	X	X	X	X						
Canadian Blood Services Processing Plant; 40 Concourse Gate											X				
Canada Science and Technology Museum; 1867 St. Laurent Blvd.												X	X	X	X
Canadian Broadcasting Corporation; 181 Queen St.									X						
Canadian Conservation Institute and Canadian Heritage Information Network; 1030 Innes Rd.	X	X	X	I	V	X	X	X	X	X	X	X	X	X	X
Canadian Guide Dogs for the Blind National Training Centre; 4120 Rideau Valley Dr. N							X		X	X	X	X	X	X	
Canadian Hazards Information Service - Seismology Survey Building, Central Experimental Farm National Historic Site; Building 7, Observator Cres.									X						
Canadian Martyrs Church; 100 Main St.	X								X						
Canadian Museum of Nature; 240 McLeod St.					V	X									
Canadian War Museum; 1 Vimy Place														X	
Cancer research lab at The Ottawa Hospital; 501 Smyth Rd.		X	X	V	V	X	X	X	X						
Canmet Bells Corners Research Complex (Canmet), Natural Resources Canada; 1 Haanel Dr.					I	X	X		X	X	X	X	X	X	X
Carleton Dominion-Chalmers Centre; 355 Cooper St.			V	V	V	X									
Carleton Immersive Media Studio (CIMS); 1125 Colonel By Dr., Visualization and Simulation Building							X			X					X
Carleton Masonic Lodge 465 A.F.A.M. 3704 Carp Rd.							X	X	X	X	X	X	X	X	X
Carleton Memorial United Church; 740 Melfa Cres.										X			X		
Carleton University (CKCU FM) Radio; 1125 Colonel By Dr., Room 517, Nideyinàn (formerly University Centre)	X	X					X	X	X	X	X	X	X	X	X
Carp Exhibit Hall; 3790 Carp Rd.							X	X	X	X	X	X	X	X	X
Carriageway, The; 55 Murray St.												X	X	X	X
Cartier Square Drill Hall; 2 Queen Elizabeth Dr.												X			
Cascades Recovery+ 2811 Sheffield Rd.			V	V		X									
C.D. Howe Building; 235 Queen St.												X	X	X	X
Central Chambers - National Capital Commission; 40 Elgin St.															X
Central Experimental Farm - Various Sites; 960 Carling Ave.										X	X				
Centre de services Guigues; 159 Murray St.								X							
Centretown Citizens Ottawa Corporation; 145 Clarence St.												X			
Centretown Mosque; 397 Kent St.	X	X													
Chaudière Falls / Portage Power (Hydro Ottawa Hydroelectric facility); 4 Booth St.			X		V	X		X							
Children's Hospital of Eastern Ontario; 401 Smyth Rd.												X			
Christ Church Bells Corners Chapel & Cemetery; 3861 Old Richmond Rd.							X	X	X						
Christ Church Cathedral Ottawa; 414 Sparks St. (formerly 420 Sparks and 439 Queen St.)	X	X	X	H	I	X	X	X	X	X	X	X	X	X	X
Christ the Saviour Orthodox Church & Holy Trinity Hall; 721 Somerset St. W	X						X		X	X		X			X
Church of St. Barnabas Apostle and Martyr; 70 James St.												X	X	X	X
Church of St. Bartholomew; 125 MacKay St.	X	X	X	H	I	X	X	X	X						
Church of the Ascension; 253 Echo Dr.		X							X					X	
Circle of Nations Learning Centre; 1 Observatory Cr., Building #2				I											
City of Ottawa Archives, Rideau Branch; 6581 Fourth Line Rd., North Gower		X	X	I		X	X	X	X	X	X	X	X	X	X
City of Ottawa Museums Collection Storage Facilities; Multiple locations					V										
City of Ottawa Spay/Neuter Clinic; 5-26 Concourse Gate								X	X						
CNA House; 50 Driveway											X				
Congregation Machzikei Hadas; 2310 Virginia Dr.							X								
Connaught Building; 555 MacKenzie Ave.			X	I			X	X	X	X	X	X	X	X	
Crichton Cultural Community Centre; 200 Crichton St., 2nd Floor															X
Crichton Lodge, Official Residence of the Norwegian Ambassador; 160 Lisgar Rd.												X		X	X
CSS Building (Canadian Space Services); 2336 Craig's Side Rd.		X	X	H	I	X	X	X	X	X	X	X	X	X	X
Cumberland Heritage Village Museum; 2940 Old Montreal Rd.	X	X	X	I	I	X	X	X	X	X	X	X	X	X	X
Cumberland Heritage Village Museum Artefact Collections - Fire Station #55; 1700 Blair Rd.												X	X	X	X
Danish Embassy Residence; 1420 Lisgar Rd.			V	V	I	X	X								
DC Canada Education Publishing Office; 105-28 Concourse Gate	X														
Delegation of the Ismaili Imamat, The; 199 Sussex Dr.	X	X	X	H	V	X		X	X	X	X	X	X	X	X
Diane A. Gagné Financial Services; 5 Blackburn Ave.										X	X	X	X	X	X
Dickinson House Museum; 1127 Mill St.	X	X	X	H	I	X	X	X	X	X	X	X	X	X	X
Diefenbunker: Canada's Cold War Museum; 3929 Carp Rd.	X	X	X	H	I		X	X	X	X	X	X	X	X	X
Discovery Centre, Carleton University; 1125 Colonel By Dr., MacOdrum Library, 4th Floor							X	X		X					
Dominican University College (DUC) / Saint-Jean-Baptiste Priory; 96 Empress Ave.					I	X	X	X	X		X	X	X	X	X
Dominion Observatory Campus, Natural Resources Canada (NRcan); 1 Observatory Cres.	X	X	X												
Dormition of the Virgin Mary Greek Orthodox Church (Greek Orthodox Church); 1315 Prince of Wales Dr.		X	X	I			X	X	X	X	X	X	X	X	X
Dunrobin United Church; 2701 Dunrobin Rd.													X		
edstudiO - University of Ottawa's Faculty of Education; 203-145 Jean-Jacques-Lussier Pvt.	X														
Elections Canada Distribution Centre; 440 Coventry Rd.								X							
Élisabeth Bruyère Hospital (Bruyère Continuing Care); 43 Bruyère St.									X		X	X	X		
Elmwood School; 261 Buena Vista Rd.				H											
Embassy of Japan; 255 Sussex Dr.												X			
Embassy of the Republic of Angola; 189 Laurier Ave. E										X		X	X	X	
Embassy of Hungary to Canada/Birkett Castle; 299 Waverly St.	X		X	H	V	X		X	X					X	X
Embassy of the Kingdom of Spain; 74 Stanley Ave.														X	
Embassy of the People's Republic of China; 515 St. Patrick St.	X	X													
Embassy of the Republic of Armenia to Canada; 7 Delaware Ave.	X	X							X	X	X	X	X		
Embassy of the Czech Republic; 251 Cooper St.							X	X	X	X	X				
Embassy of the United States of America; 490 Sussex Dr.			X	I	I	X			X	X	X	X	X	X	X
Enriched Bread Artists Studio (EBA); 951 Gladstone Ave.	X	X	X	H	I	X	X	X	X	X	X	X	X	X	X
Evangelical Lutheran Church of St. Paul; 210 Wilbrod St.					I			X	X	X	X				
Faculty of Health Sciences Building; 200 Lees Ave.	X		X												
Fairfields Heritage House; 3080 Richmond Rd.	X	X	X		V	X	X	X	X	X	X	X	X	X	X
Fairmont Château Laurier; 1 Rideau St.														X	
Festival House; 450 Churchill Ave. N											X				
Fire Station 35; 2355 Alta Vista Dr.			X												
First Baptist Church Ottawa; 140 Laurier Ave. W	X		X	I	I		X	X	X	X	X	X	X	X	X
First Church of Christ, Scientist, Ottawa; 288 Metcalfe St.	X		X	I	I	X	X	X	X	X	X	X	X	X	X
First Unitarian Congregation of Ottawa; 30 Cleary Ave.						X									
Fleck Paterson House (Embassy of Algeria); 500 Wilbrod St.				H	V	X	X	X	X	X	X	X	X		X
Flora Hall Brewing; 37 Flora St.							X	X							
Forest Explorers Early Learning Centre, and Ottawa Forest and Nature School; 411 Corkstown Rd.	X														
French Embassy in Canada; 42 Sussex Dr.	X		X	I		X	X	X		X	X				X
Fung Loy Kok Institute of Taoism Ottawa Branch Centre; 2930 Carling Ave.							X	X							
Geological Survey of Canada Building; 601 Booth St. Complex									X						
Geomagnetic Laboratory of Natural Resources Canada; 2617 Anderson Rd.								X							
Global Centre for Pluralism; 330 Sussex Dr.					V	X	X	X	X						
Gloucester Artefact Collection Storage - Leitrim Complex; 4550 Bank St.								X	X	X	X	X	X	X	X
Gloucester Historical Society; 4550B Bank St.			X	I	I		X	X	X	X	X	X	X	X	
Goodwood Masonic Lodge; 3494 McBean St.									X						
Gordon Harrison Canadian Landscape Gallery; 495 Sussex Dr.											X	X	X	X	X
Goulbourn Museum; 2064 Huntley Rd.	X	X	X		V	X	X	X	X	X	X	X	X	X	X
Greenboro Station; 2118 Bank St.				I											
Hazeldean Masonic Lodge; 21 Young Rd.									X						X
Header House - Blink Gallery; Major's Hill Park										X					
Herb Garden Heritage Barn (Meehan Family Log Barn); 3840 Old Almonte Rd.			X									X	X	X	X
Heritage Building and Ottawa City Hall (Ottawa Sport Hall of Fame); 110 Laurier Ave. W	X	X	X	I	I	X	X	X	X	X	X	X	X	X	X
High Commission of Malaysia; 60 Boteler St.										X					
High Commission of the Republic of Trinidad and Tobago; 200 First Ave.								X	X	X	X	X			
Hindu Temple of Ottawa-Carleton; 4835 Bank St.	X	X	X	I	I		X	X	X	X	X	X	X	X	X
HMCS Bytown Wardroom; 78 Lisgar St.															X
HMCS CARLETON; 79 Prince of Wales Dr.									X	X					
HUB Ottawa; 71 Bank St., 6th floor										X	X	X			
Hydro Ottawa, Chaudière Falls No. 2 Generating Station; 156 Middle St. (formerly Mill St.)									X	X	X	X	X	X	X
Huron Early Learning Centre; 24 Capilano Dr.															X
Ingenium Centre; 1865 St. Laurent Blvd.	X	X	X												
Irving Greenberg Theatre Centre - Home of the GCTC; 1233 Wellington St. W							X		X						
Jack Doyle Athletics and Recreation Centre; 1385 Woodroffe Ave., Building X				H	I										
James Bartleman Centre (City of Ottawa Central Archives and Ottawa Public Library Materials Centre); 100 Tallwood Dr.				V	V	X				X		X	X	X	
Jami Omar Mosque; 3990 Old Richmond Rd.	X		X	I	I	X	X	X	X	X	X				
Jane's Walk in Lowertown East; 501 Old St. Patrick St.										X					
Jane's Walk tour of the National House of Prayer; 17 Myrand Ave.									X						
Jean-Léon Library, Saint Paul University; 223 Main St.							X	X	X						
Jockvale Heritage Building; 3131 Jockvale Rd.													X		
Kadampa Meditation Centre Ottawa (formerly Joyful Land Buddhist Centre); 879 Somerset St. W	X	X	X	H	V	X	X	X	X	X	X		X	X	
Kanata United Church; 33 Leacock Dr.	X														
Kitchissippi United Church; 630 Island Park Dr.													X		
Knox Presbyterian Church; 120 Lisgar St.	X	X	X	H	I		X	X	X	X	X	X	X	X	X
Knox United Church; 25 Gibbard Ave.												X			
K.W. Neatby Building; 930 Carling Ave.															X
La Nouvelle Scène Gilles Desjardins (LNSGD); 333 King Edward Ave.								X							
Laurentian Leadership Centre; 252 Metcalfe St.	X				V	X		X	X			X	X	X	
Laurier House National Historic Site; 335 Laurier Ave. E	X	X	X	I			X	X	X	X	X	X	X	X	X
Le Cordon Bleu Paris, Ottawa Culinary Arts Institute - Munross House; 453 Laurier Ave. E									X	X	X		X		
Lemieux Island Water Purification Plant; 1 Onigam St.							X		X				X		
Lester B. Pearson Building; Global Affairs Canada; 125 Sussex Dr.								X	X	X	X	X	X	X	X
Library and Archives Canada; 395 Wellington St.	X	X	X	I		X	X	X	X	X					
Library of Parliament - Former Bank of Nova Scotia; 125 Sparks St.	X	X	X	I		X	X		X	X	X	X	X	X	X
Lisgar Collegiate Institute; 29 Lisgar St.	X	X	X	I	I	X	X	X	X		X		X	X	X
MAC Barrhaven Islamic Centre; 3971 Greenbank Rd.		X													
MacKay United Church; 257 MacKay St.													X	X	
MacOdrum Library, Carleton University; 1125 Colonel By Dr.									X						
Makerspace North; 250 City Centre, Bay 216									X						
Maplelawn Historic Garden; 529 Richmond Rd.							X	X	X	X	X	X	X	X	X
Masjid Bilal (Islamic Society of Cumberland); 4509 Innes Rd.							X	X	X	X					
Mayfair Theatre; 1074 Bank St.									X		X	X	X		
Meadowview Barn, Canada Agriculture and Food Museum Collection; Building 95, Central Experimental Farm											X				
McMillan; 541 Sussex Dr., 2nd & 3rd Floors								X	X						
McPhail Memorial Baptist Church; 249 Bronson Ave.														X	X
Mill Street Brewpub - Thompson Perkins Building; 555 Wellington Ave.							X	X	X						
Mooney's Bay Intergenerational Early Learning Centre - a program of Andrew Fleck Children's Services; 2826 Springland Dr.	X														
Mosque of Mercy; 1216 Hunt Club Rd.			X	I	I	X	X	X	X						
Mother House Chapel, Sisters of Charity of Ottawa; 27 Bruyère St.									X		X	X			
Mulligan Building, Health Canada, Product Safety Laboratory / Parks Canada Conservation Laboratories; 1800 Walkley Rd.							X	X	X						
Mutchmor Public School; 185 Fifth Ave.														X	X
National Arts Centre; 1 Elgin St.						X	X								
National Association of Friendship Centres (NAFC); 275 MacLaren St.														X	
National Gallery of Canada; 380 Sussex Dr.						X	X	X	X	X	X	X	X	X	X
National Research Council Canada (NRC) - Ocean, Coastal and River Engineering Facilities; 1200 Montreal Rd., M-32									X						
National Research Council Canada (NRC) - Temple of Science; 100 Sussex Dr.								X	X	X					
National Research Council Canada (NRC) - Uplands Wind Tunnel Facilities; 1920 Research Rd., Bdg. U70									X	X					
Navan-Vars United Church; 1129 Smith Rd.	X														
Nepean Creative Arts Centre; 35 Stafford Rd.	X														
Nepean High School; 574 Broadview Ave.	X														
Nepean Museum; 16 Rowley Ave.							X	X	X	X	X	X	X	X	X
Nepean Sailing Club; 3259 Carling Ave.	X	X	X	I		X		X	X	X	X	X	X	X	X
New Edinburgh House; 255 MacKay St.													X	X	
NORR Architects; 55 Murray St., 6th Floor													X	X	
Northern Lights Educational Services - Turkish Cultural Centre; 26 Thorncliff Place, 2nd Floor														X	
OC Transpo Industrial Garage; 745 Industrial Ave.													X	X	X
OC Transpo Simulator Facility; 925 Belfast Rd.						X		X							
OC Transpo's Integrated Operations Centre; 875 Belfast Rd.												X			
OC Transpo Walkley Yard Maintenance Facility, O-Train Line 2; 3101 Albion Rd. N								X			X			X	X
Official Residence of the Ambassador of Ireland; 291 Park Rd.														X	
Official Residence of the Ambassador of Sweden; 700 Manor Ave.													X	X	
Official Residence of the High Commissioner of South Africa; 5 Rideau Gate														X	
Official Residence of the Greek Ambassador; 534 Queen Elizabeth Dr.												X			
Ojigkwanong Centre for Aboriginal Culture and Education (CACE), Ceiling Installation; 1125 Colonel By Dr., 228 Paterson Hall										X					
Olde Forge Community Resource Centre; 2730 Carling Ave.										X					
ONEC Tennis Pavillion; 504 Sir George-Etienne Cartier Pkwy.	X														
Orléans Health Hub, Hopital Monfort; 2225 Mer-Bleue					I										
Osgoode Township Museum; 7814 Lawrence St.	X	X	X	H	I	X	X	X	X						X
O-Train East Extension: Trim Station; 1175 Trim Rd.		X													
Ottawa Art Gallery; 10 Daly Ave. / 50 Mackenzie King Bridge	X	X	X	H	I	X	X	X							
Ottawa Birth and Wellness Centre; 2260 Walkley Rd., unit 101							X	X							
Ottawa Chinese Bible Church; 31 Graham Ave.							X	X							
Ottawa Christian School; 255 Tartan Dr.															X
Ottawa Citizen; 1101 Baxter Rd.												X	X	X	X
Ottawa City Woodshop; 430 Gladstone Ave.	X														
Ottawa Fire Services Communications Centre; Alta Vista						X									
Ottawa Fire Services Maintenance Division; 1443 Carling Ave.						X									
Ottawa Fire Services Station 24; 230 Viewmount Dr.							X								
Ottawa Fire Services Station 36; 1935 Cyrville Rd.								X							
Ottawa Fire Services Station 37; 910 Earl Armstrong Rd.					I										
Ottawa Fire Services Station 46 & Command Vehicle; 34 Iber Rd.												X			
Ottawa Fire Services Station 47; 3559 Greenbank Rd.							X	X	X						
Ottawa Fire Services Station 55; 2283 Portobello Blvd.								X							
Ottawa Fire Services Training Centre; 898 Industrial Ave.									X	X	X				
Ottawa Fire Station 62; 6900 Harbour St.											X				
Ottawa Fire Station 63; 341 Bayview Dr.											X				
Ottawa Fire Station 64; 475 Donald Munro Dr.							X	X	X	X	X				
Ottawa Fire Station 73; 6090 Rockdale Dr.											X				
Ottawa Fire Station 81; 1641 Stittsville Main St.							X	X	X	X	X				
Ottawa Fire Station 82; 6280 Perth St.					I						X				
Ottawa Fire Station 83; 2352 Roger Stevens Dr.											X				
Ottawa Fire Station 84; 3449 Old Almonte Rd.							X	X	X	X	X				
Ottawa Fire Station 91; 8011 Victoria Rd.									X	X	X				
Ottawa Fire Station 93; 6891 Parkway Rd.							X	X							
Ottawa Food Bank; 2001 Bantree St. (formerly at 1317 Michael St.)				I								X			
Ottawa Glassblowing Co-op; 957-C Gladstone Ave.	X	X	X	I											
Ottawa Humane Society; 245 West Hunt Club Rd.			V	V	V										
Ottawa Integrative Cancer Centre; 29 Bayswater Ave.								X	X	X	X	X			
Ottawa Jail Hostel; 75 Nicholas St.	X	X	X				X	X		X					
Ottawa Little Theatre; 400 King Edward Ave.	X	X	X												
Ottawa Mail Processing Plant; 1424 Sandford Fleming Ave.														X	§
Ottawa Main Mosque; 251 Northwestern Ave.	X	X	X	I	I	X	X	X	X	X	X	X	X	X	X
Ottawa Masonic Centre / Tunis Shriners Temple; 2140 Walkley Rd.				I	I	X	X	X							
Ottawa Mission; 35 Waller St.	X	X	X	H		X	X	X	X						
Ottawa New Edinburgh Club (ONEC); 501 Sir George-Étienne Cartier Pkwy.								X	X	X	X	X	X	X	X
Ottawa Paramedic Service Headquarters; 2495 Don Reid Dr.	X	X				X	X	X	X	X	X	X	X	X	X
Ottawa Peace Latvian Evangelical Lutheran Church; 83 Main St.								X							
Ottawa Police Professional Development Centre; 1385 Woodroffe Ave., Building P				I			X	X		X	X	X	X	X	
Ottawa Police Service; 474 Elgin St.											X	X			
Ottawa Police Service (East Division); 3343 St. Joseph Blvd.															X
Ottawa Public Library, Vernon Branch; 8682 Bank St.														X	X
Ottawa Rowing Club; 10 Lady Grey Dr.								X	X	X	X	X	X	X	X
Ottawa School of Art; 35 George St.	X		X										X	X	X
Ottawa Sikh Society Gurwara Sahib; 25 Gurdwara Rd.															X
Ottawa Tennis and Lawn Bowling Club; 176 Cameron Ave.	X	X	X				X	X	X	X	X				
Ottawa Valley Grain Products; 405 Donald B. Munro Dr.		X													
Ottawa Valley Wild Bird Care Centre; 734 Moodie Dr.								X	X	X					
Ottawa Visitor Centre; 54 Elgin St.	X														
Ottawa Wedding Chapel; 3249 Yorks Corners Rd.		X	X	H	I	X	X	X	X						
Parkdale Food Centre; 2-30 Rosemount Ave.							X	X	X	X	X	X			
Parkdale Food Centre - Pushkin Hall; 89 Stonehurst Ave.													X	X	
Parks Canada Collections Storage Facility; 2630 Sheffield Rd.							X		X						
Parliamentary Precinct Block 2 Redevelopment Project; 191 Sparks St.					I										
Parliamentary Precinct Rehabilitation; 111 Wellington St.	X	X	X	H											
Parliament of Canada: Centre Block; 111 Wellington St.					I	X									
Parliament of Canada: East Block; 111 Wellington St.									X						
Pinhey's Point Historic Site; 270 Pinhey's Point Rd.		X		I	I		X	X	X	X	X	X	X	X	X
Protection of the Holy Virgin Russian Orthodox Church; 99 Stonehurst Ave.							X	X	X	X	X	X	X	X	X
Public Service Alliance of Canada; 233 Gilmour St.								X		X		X			
Public Works Big Wheels Expo; 300 Coventry Rd.	X	X	X												
Queen of the Most Holy Rosary Roman Catholic Parish; 20 Grant St.									X	X	X				
Richmond Orange Hall; 3550 McBean St., Richmond				V	V	X									
Rideau Branch, Ottawa Public Library; 377 Rideau St.															X
Rideau Hall; 1 Sussex Dr.	X	X	X	I	I	X	X	X	X	X	X	X	X	X	X
Rideau Valley Wildlife Sanctuary; 3370 Mulholland Rd.	X						X	X	X	X					
Robert O. Pickard Environmental Centre (ROPEC); 800 Green Creek Dr.													X	X	X
Roger Guindon Hall (RGN), Faculty of Medicine, University of Ottawa; 451 Smyth Rd.					V	X	X	X	X						
Rogers TV; 475 Richmond Rd.	X	X	X	I			X	X	X	X	X	X			
Routhier Community Centre (Billings Estate Artefact Collection Storage); 172 Guiges St.			X	I			X	X	X	X	X	X	X	X	X
Royal Canadian Mint; 320 Sussex Dr.	X	X					X	X	X		X	X	X		
Royal College of Physicians and Surgeons of Canada; 774 Echo Dr.	X	X		V	V	X	X				X		X	X	X
Saint Brigid's Centre for the Arts; 310 St. Patrick St.									X	X	X	X			X
Saint Francis of Assisi Church (Saint-François d'Assise); 20 Fairmont Ave.	X	X	X	I				X	X	X	X	X	X		X
Saint James Anglican Church Leitrim; 2540 Bank St.															X
Saint Matthew and Great Martyr Hristina Church; 19 Cordova St.					I	X									
Saint-Vincent Hospital - Bruyère Continuing Care; 60 Cambridge St. N.													X	X	
Scouts Canada National Museum; 1345 Baseline Rd.	X	X	X	H	I	X	X	X	X	X	X	X	X	X	X
Senate of Canada Building (Government Conference Centre); 2 Rideau St.					V								X	X	X
Shenkman Arts Centre; 245 Centrum Blvd.															X
Shopify - Headquarters; 150 Elgin St., 6th floor							X	X		X					
Simmonds Architecture; 340 Catherine St.				I											
Sir John A. Macdonald Building - Former Bank of Montreal; 144 Wellington St.									X	X					
Smart Apartment at Bruyère; 75 Bruyère St.							X								
Southminster United Church; 15 Aylmer Ave.	X	X		I	V		X	X	X	X	X	X	X	X	X
South Nepean Muslim Community; 3020 Woodroffe Ave. (formerly 3131 Jockvale Rd.)	X	X		I			X	X	X	X	X	X		X	
SPAO (School of the Photographic Arts Ottawa) Centre; 77 Pamilla St.	X	X	X	H	I	X									
Sri Sathya Sai Baba Spiritual Centre of Ottawa-Carleton; 1694 Hunt Club Rd.	X	X	X	I	I		X	X	X	X	X	X	X	X	X
Stables Artists' Studios; 155 Loretta Ave. N											X				
Stadacona Hall - Brunei High Commission; 395 Laurier Ave. E							X	X	X						
St Aidan's Anglican Church; 934 Hamlet Rd.	X														
St. Albans Church; 454 King Edward Ave.							X	X	X	X	X				
Standard Bread Company building (Gladstone Clayworks Co-Op Pottery Studio); 949-B Gladstone Ave.			X	I	I		X	X	X	X	X	X	X	X	X
Standard Bread Company building (The Loft Art Studios); 951 Gladstone Ave.			X	I	I		X								
Standards Building; 151 Tunney's Pasture Driveway								X	X						
Station 11 (Better Business Bureau); 424 Parkdale Ave.			X	I											
St. Andrew's Presbyterian Church; 82 Kent St.	X	X	X	I			X	X	X	X	X	X	X	X	X
St. Andrew's Presbyterian Church Stittsville; 2 Mulkins St.					I										
St. Anne Church; 528 Old St. Patrick St.												X	X		
St. Elias Antiochian Orthodox Cathedral; 2975 Riverside Dr.															X
St-François d'Assise Church; 1064 Wellington St.														X	
St. Giles Presbyterian Church; 181 First Ave.		X													
St. James Anglican Church; 3774 Carp Rd.												X			
St. James Anglican Church Leitrim; 4540 Bank St.			X	I	I		X	X	X	X	X	X	X	X	
St James the Apostle Anglican Church; 1138 Bridge St.	X					X			X			X	X	X	X
St. John Lutheran Church; 270 Crichton St.					V										
St. John's South March Anglican Church; 325 Sandhill Rd.												X			
St. John the Baptist Ukrainian Catholic Shrine; 952 Green Valley Cres.							X	X	X	X	X	X	X		
St. John the Evangelist Anglican Church, The; 154 Somerset Ave. W	X	X	X	I	I		X		X	X	X				
St. Joseph Church; 2757 St. Joseph Blvd.														X	X
St. Luke Lutheran Church; 326 MacKay St.										X	X				
St. Luke's Anglican Church; 760 Somerset St. W					I	X									
St. Mark the Evangelist Anglican Church; 1606 Fisher Ave.								X	X						
St. Margaret's Anglican Church Vanier; 206 Montreal Rd.		X	X												
St. Mary's Anglican Church; 2574 Sixth Line Rd.	X	X	X		I		X	X	X	X	X	X	X	X	X
St. Mary the Virgin Anglican Church, Blackburn Hamlet; 2750 Navan Rd.	X	X													
St. Matthew's Anglican Church; 130 Glebe Ave.					I	X			X	X	X	X	X	X	
St. Matthias Anglican Church; 555 Parkdale Ave.													X		
St. Michael and All Angels Anglican Church; 2112 Bel-Air Dr.															X
St. Paul Lutheran Church; 210 Wilbrod St.	X	X	X	I								X	X	X	X
St. Paul's Eastern United Church; 473 Cumberland St.							X	X	X	X		X	X	X	
St. Peter and St. Paul's Anglican Church; 152 Metcalfe St.					I	X									
St. Peter's Evangelical Lutheran Church; 400 Sparks St.					V		X	X	X	X	X	X	X	X	
Studio of Canadian Landscape Artist Gordon Harrison; 67 Rideau Terr. (formerly 81 John St.)											X	X	X	X	X
Suntech Greenhouse; 5541 Doyle Rd.	X	X	X				X		X	X	X	X	X	X	X
Supreme Court of Canada; 301 Wellington St.	X	X	X			X	X	X	X	X	X	X	X	X	X
TD Place; 1015 Bank St.								X		X					
The Avalon Studios; 738A Bank St.											X	X			
The Bytown Fire Brigade Historical Society; 1-2880 Sheffield Rd.		X													
The Centre for Health Innovation; 429 MacLaren St.	X	X	X	V	V	X									
The Commissariat Building (Bytown Museum); 1 Canal Lane	X	X	X	H	I	X	X	X	X	X	X	X	X	X	X
The Gladstone Theatre; 910 Gladstone Ave.	X	X	X												
The Hospice at May Court; 114 Cameron Ave.														X	X
The Office of CSV Architects; 402-1066 Somerset St. W.														X	
The Ottawa Curling Club; 440 O'Connor St.									X		X	X			
The Ottawa Hospital's New Campus; Suite 216-250 City Centre Ave.	X														
The Ottawa Jewish Archives; 21 Nadolny Sachs Pvt.											X	X			
The Ottawa Hospital Minimally Invasive Surgical Suites; 1053 Carling Ave.									X						
The Ottawa Hospital Rehabilitation Centre; 505 Smyth Rd.								X	X						
The Ottawa Cancer Foundation - Maplesoft-Jones Centre and Cancer Survivors Park; 1500 Alta Vista Dr.	X	X	X					X	X	X			X	X	
The Ottawa Rotary Home; 823 Rotary Way								X		X	X	X			
Therapeutic Riding Association of Ottawa-Carleton (TROtt); 6362-1 Bank St.	X	X	X	I											
The Rectory Art House (St. Brigid's Centre for the Arts); 179 Murray St.							X		X	X	X	X	X	X	
The Rideau Club; 99 Bank St., 15th Flr.		X									X				
The Royal Canadian Geographical Society (RCGS); 50 Sussex Dr.								X							
The Toller House (Croatian Embassy); 229 Chapel St.		X	X	I			X	X	X	X	X	X	X	X	X
Thomson Hall o/a The Keg Manor; 529 Richmond Rd.					I		X	X	X	X	X	X	X	X	X
Traffic Operations, Public Works; 175 Loretta Ave. N											X	X	X	X	X
Trail Waste Facility; 4475 Trail Rd.			V		V										
Transportation Safety Board (TSB) Engineering Laboratory; 1901 Research Rd., Bdlg. U-100						X					X	X		X	
Trinity Anglican Church; 1230 Bank St.	X	X	X	I	I		X								
TV Rogers; 1810 St. Laurent Blvd., Building A												X	X		
University of Ottawa - Guided Tours of the Historical Sector (Jane's Walk); 550 Cumberland St.											X		X	X	X
University of Ottawa Heart Institute; 40 Ruskin St.	X														
University of Ottawa Skills and Simulation Centre; 725 Parkdale Ave. / 1053 Carling Ave.	X			I	V	X	X	X	X						
uOttawa-IBM Cyber Range, STEM Complex; 150 Louis-Pasteur Pvt.	X														
Vanier Museopark; 300 Des Pères Blancs Ave., 2nd Floor	X	X	X	I	I	X	X	X	X	X	X	X	X	X	X
Vietnam House; 85 Glebe Ave.							X	X	X	X	X	X			
Wabano Centre for Aboriginal Health; 299 Montreal Rd.								X	X	X		X	X		
Wallis House; 589 Rideau St.	X	X				X	X	X	X						
Watson's Mill; 5525 Dickinson St.	X	X	X	H	I	X	X	X	X	X	X	X	X	X	X
Waupoos Foundation and Waupoos Family Farm; 2050 Rideau Rd.			X		I		X	X	X	X	X	X			
Wellington Building; 180 Wellington St.									X	X					
West Block; 111 Wellington St.					V	X									
Westboro Masonic Temple; 430 Churchill Ave		X	X				X	X		X	X	X	X	X	X
Westminster Presbyterian Church; 470 Roosevelt Ave.		X													
World University Service of Canada; 1404 Scott St.				I											
Youville Centre; 150 Mann Ave.											X	X	X		

§ - cancelled due to potential labour disruption

== See also ==
- Doors Open Canada
- Doors Open Toronto
