= Mechanicsville, Ottawa =

Mechanicsville
- Neighbourhood
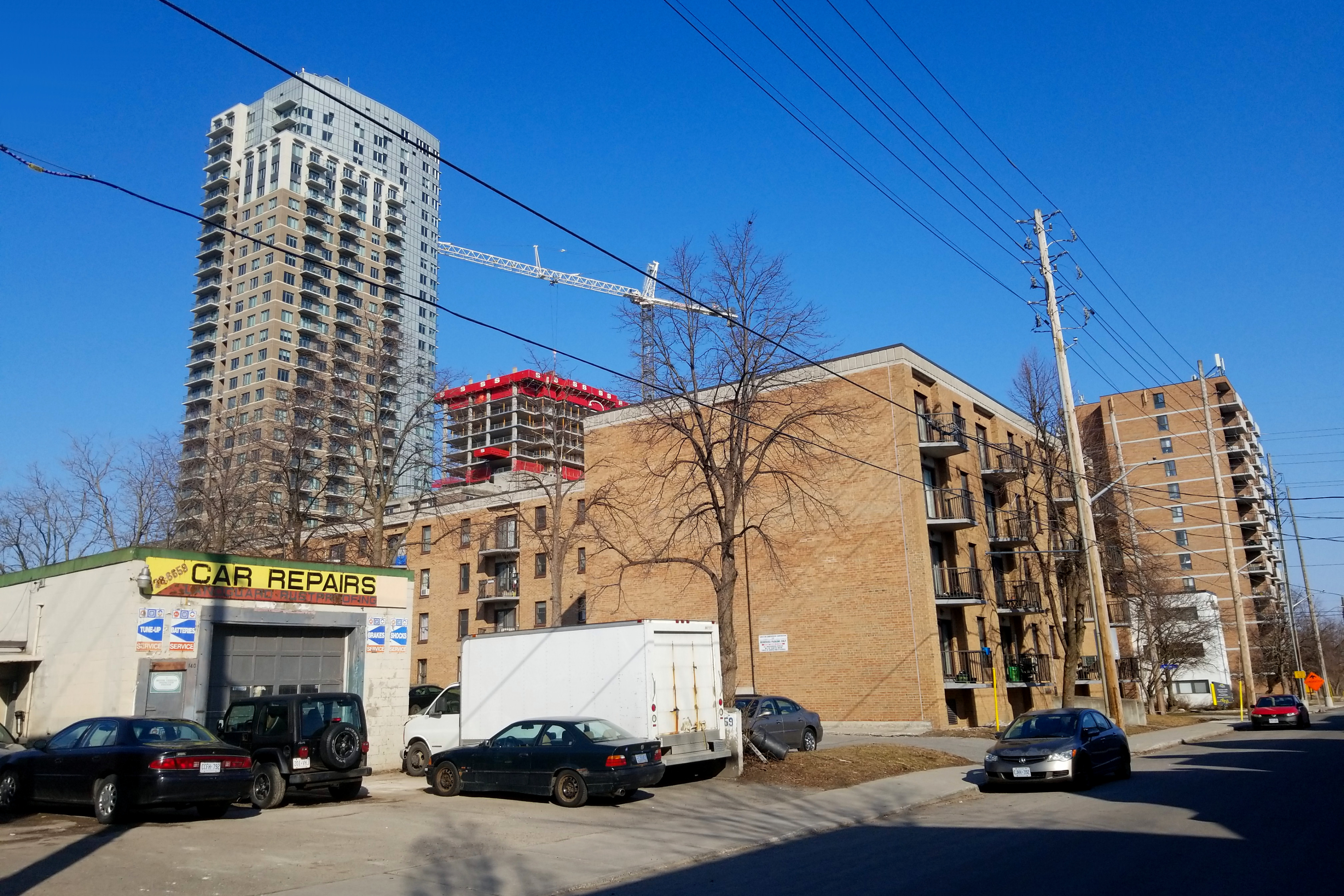

- Location within Ottawa
- Coordinates: 45°24′40″N 75°44′00″W
- Country: Canada
- Province: Ontario
- City: Ottawa

Government
  - MPs: Yasir Naqvi
  - MPPs: Catherine McKenney
  - Councillors: Jeff Leiper
- Elevation: 60 m (200 ft)

Population (2011)
  - Total: 2,205
- Canada 2011 Census
- Time zone: UTC-5 (EST)
  - Summer (DST): UTC-4 (EDT)

Mechanicsville is a neighbourhood in Kitchissippi Ward in central Ottawa, Ontario, Canada. It is located to the west of downtown and bordered by the Ottawa River to the north, O-Train Line 2 to the east, Scott Street to the south, and Parkdale Avenue to the west. East of Mechanicsville is LeBreton Flats, Tunney's Pasture is directly west, and Hintonburg is to the south. The total population of the neighbourhood as of the 2011 Census was 2,205.

== History ==
Plan of subdivision was prepared and certified by Robert Sparks, P.L.Surveyor in 1872, it being the property of Mrs T.M. Blasdel & A.H.Baldwin Esq, and certified as a true copy of plan 35A, 7 June 1976 by the Assistant Examiner of surveys. The Village of Mechanicsville being part of Lot 36 Concession A of Nepean.

The limits were (Burnside) to the north and running down to the Ottawa River at the Sluce cutting; First street on the east (Stonehurst Avenue); Road allowance and the Canada Central Railway to the south (Scott Street); Fifth Street (Parkdale Avenue) to the west.

The first modest houses were probably built about 1875. They were of wood balloon frame covered with 1x12 inch planks inside and out with wood or other siding, with the foundations projecting four inches beyond the edge of the finished frame to take a brick finish as people became able to afford this luxury.

The area was annexed to the city of Ottawa in 1911. Some sources suggest that the name Mechanicsville arose after this annexation because it became home to blue collar workers, especially those who worked in the rail yards, or lumber and paper mills who had been displaced by the Great Fire of 1900. In fact, Mechanicsville was known by that name as early as 1879 when it was shown in Belden's Historical Atlas of Carleton County in Nepean Twp., being part of Lot 36 in Concession A, Ottawa Front. Mechanicsville in 1879 was considerably smaller than the present day Ottawa neighbourhood. Its western boundary was then the present-day Parkdale Avenue.

In the 1950s and 1960s, when what is now known as the Kichi Zibi Mikan, (formerly the Macdonald Parkway) was being developed by the National Capital Commission, large sections of the neighbourhood along the river were expropriated and demolished. While this created green space, the parkway and on and off-ramps at Parkdale Avenue have also created a barrier to the waterfront.

In the 1970s and 1980s, expansion of Scott Street, and the development of the Transitway along the old rail line on Scott has served to cut off the area from the area south of Scott, which was at one time, considered part of the Mechanicsville neighbourhood.

== Area character ==
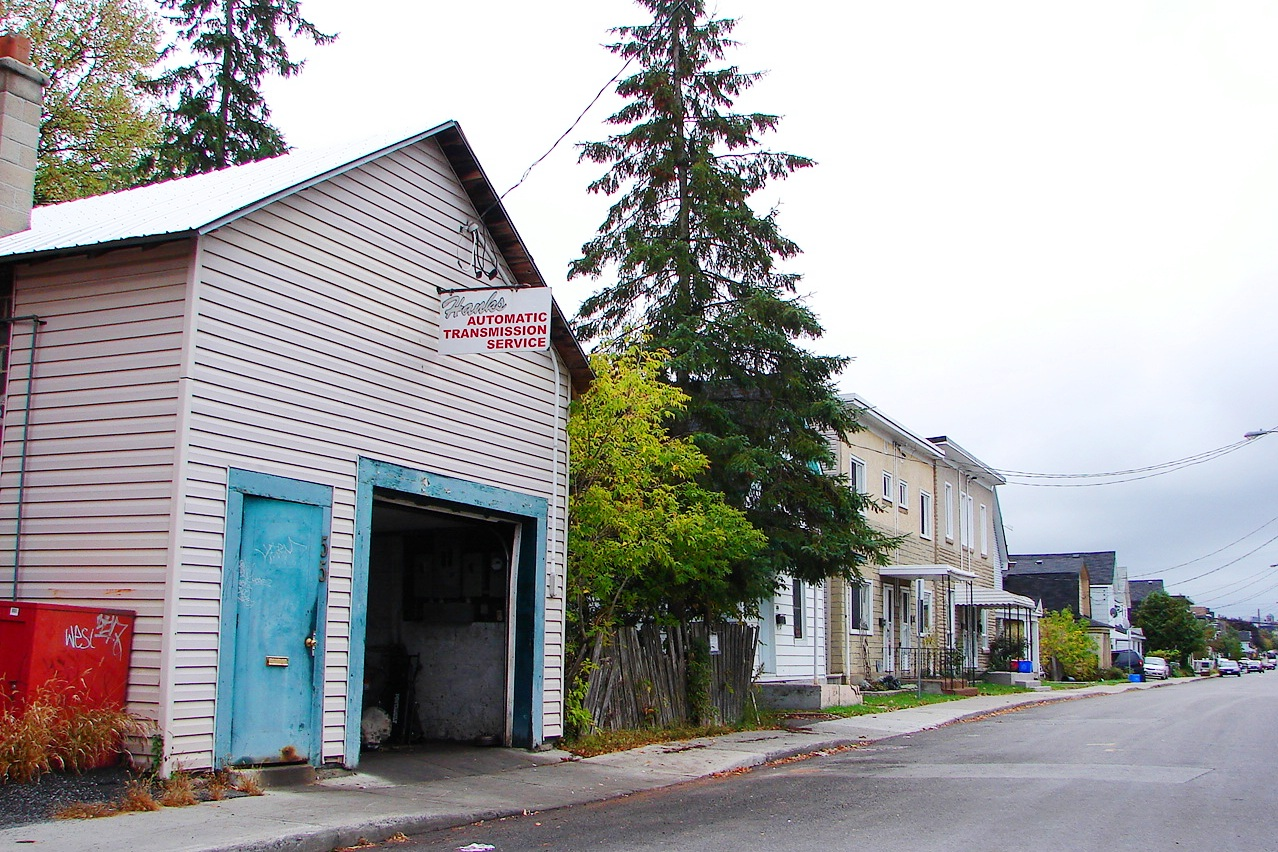
Carruthers Avenue, 2011

The area is mostly residential, of wood-frame/wood siding 1900s era homes on grid streets. Along Parkdale Avenue, there are several newer highrise apartment buildings. To the east is an older industrial area along Bayview.

The neighbourhood has good bus access and has experienced infilling of town homes in recent years. These include both low- and high-income housing. In 2007, a serious fire affected some high density social housing and the neighbourhood helped the victims of this fire. Prominent landmarks include the Protection of the Holy Virgin Memorial Church and the Embassy of Indonesia.
