= Billings Estate Museum =

Coordinates: 45.389832°N 75.672235°W

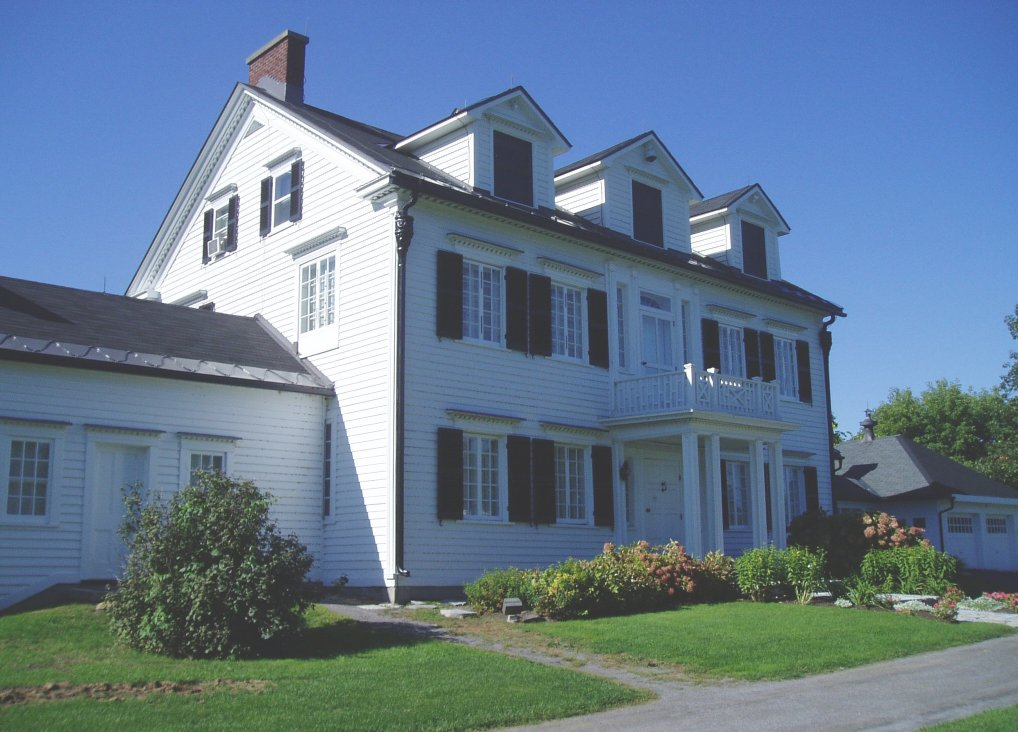
- Established: 1975; 51 years ago
- Location: Ottawa, Ontario, Canada
- Type: house museum

National Historic Site of Canada
- Official name: Billings House National Historic Site of Canada
- Designated: 1968

The Billings Estate National Historic Site is a heritage museum in Ottawa, Ontario, Canada. It is located at 2100 Cabot St. in the former home of one of the region's earliest settlers. The oldest wood-framed house in Ottawa was built in 1827-9 by Massachusetts-born Braddish Billings. It became the home for the following four generations of the Billings family including Braddish's son, the noted paleontologist Elkanah Billings. It is Ottawa's oldest surviving house, though the Bytown Museum building is older. Billings had moved to the area in 1812, and was the first settler in Gloucester Township.

Billings became prosperous in the timber trade and built the large home that was named Park Hill. Billings later moved into agriculture, and the house became the centre of a large and prosperous farm providing produce for Bytown, with the farm linked to the town by the Bytown and Prescott Railway.

The estate remained in the Billings family until 1975. Over time the property was slowly sold off to developers, and today the estate retains only a relatively small plot of land. In 1975, the house became the Billings Estate Museum which is today operated by the City of Ottawa. The house is included amongst other architecturally interesting and historically significant buildings in Doors Open Ottawa, held each year in early June.

The estate also includes a historic cemetery that contains graves dating back to 1820.

== Billings Estate Artifact Collection - Routhier Community Centre ==
The museum's collection includes over 13,000 artifacts. Very few of the artifacts owned by the Billings Estate National Historic Site are on display at any given time. The Billings Estate Artifact Collection storage facility, located at the Routhier Community Centre (172 Guigues Ave.) includes items that have never been on exhibit, and is used by collections staff to preserve artifacts for safe keeping. The storage facility is also open during Doors Open Ottawa, held each year in early June.

== See also ==
- List of designated heritage properties in Ottawa
- Elkanah Billings
