= St. Barnabas, Apostle and Martyr Anglican Church =

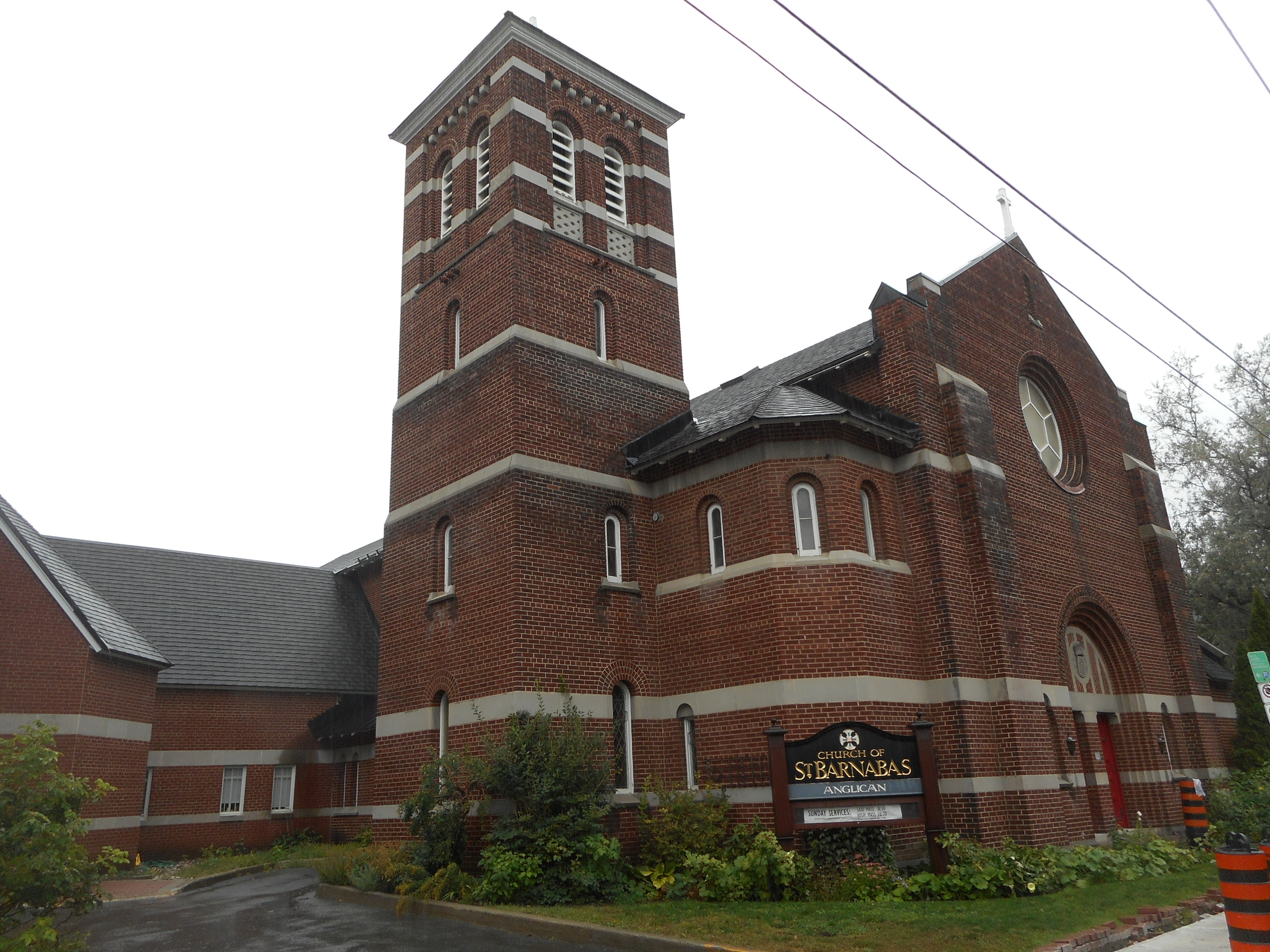
- St. Barnabas, Apostle and Martyr Anglican Church
- 45.41224°N 75.6971°W
- Location: 70 James Street; Ottawa, Ontario; K1R 5M3
- Denomination: Anglican Church of Canada
- Churchmanship: Anglo-Catholic
- Website: stbarnabasottawa.com

History
- Dedication: St. Barnabas

Administration
- Province: Ontario
- Diocese: Ottawa
- Archdeaconry: Ottawa West
- Deanery: Ottawa West

Clergy
- Rector: The Rev. Canon George Kwari

St. Barnabas, Apostle and Martyr Anglican Church is an Anglican church in the Anglo-Catholic tradition at 70 James Street (at Kent Street) in Ottawa, Ontario, Canada.

== History ==
St. Barnabas has been an Anglo-Catholic parish in the Anglican Communion since its inception in 1889 in Stewarton.

The church, which opened in 1931, was designed by architect Colin M. Drewitt in a combination of Byzantine style and Romanesque style. Highlights include the roof beam, the triptych above the high altar, the Lady Chapel, the shrines of Our Lady and of St. Barnabas, the baptistry, the Nativity painting by Norbert Chapdelaine, the Stations of the Cross, the stained glass windows and the 1897 Casavant Frères organ.

== Organ ==
In 1958, an Electropneumatic organ, built by Hill, Norman and Beard (England), was installed in the gallery at the “west” end of the church. The instrument of two manuals and 20 stops was dedicated on October 25, 1958. In 1982, the organ was rebuilt by Francois Caron. The console was replaced (the surround being retained), new wind chests were installed and a large amount of new pipework was added, bringing the specification to 29 stops. The new organ was blessed and dedicated on October 24, 1982, as a memorial to those members of the congregation who gave their lives in two world wars. During the 1982 rebuild, the organ case was expanded to incorporate new pipework, and reconfigured so as to not obscure the rose window above it. In mid-October 1982, the organ was installed. It was blessed and dedicated on October 24, 1982, the Feast of Dedication, by the Rt. Rev. E.K. Lackey, Bishop of Ottawa, as a memorial to those members of the congregation who gave their lives in two world wars. In 1995, the organ case was beautified by stylistic wooden mouldings and countless hours of careful hand-painting. The original swell box mechanism, retained from the Hill, Norman and Beard instrument was replaced in summer 1997. In 1998, all of the pipework was removed and shipped to Montreal for cleaning, adjustment and revoicing by Sylvain Brisson. There was a rededication of the organ at Solemn Evensong and Benediction on the Feast of Dedication, October 18, 1998.

== Events ==
The Church was included amongst other architecturally interesting and historically significant buildings in Doors Open Ottawa, held June 2 and 3, 2012. The church held the state funeral for Canadian federal cabinet minister Humphrey Mitchell in 1950.

== See also ==
- State funerals in Canada
