= Elkanah Billings =

Canadian paleontologist (1820–1876)

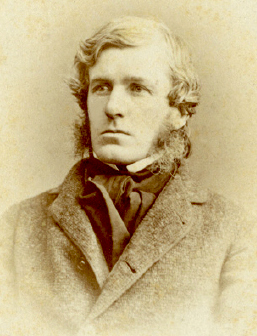
- Elkanah Billings
- Born: May 5, 1820; Rideau River
- Died: June 14, 1876 (aged 56); Montreal
- Scientific career
- Fields: paleontology

Elkanah Billings (May 5, 1820 – June 14, 1876) is often referred to as Canada's first paleontologist. Billings was born on a farm by the Rideau River outside Bytown (Ottawa), now known as Billings Estate. His parents were named Lamira Dow and Braddish Billings. His family included an older sister named Sabra and an older brother Maj Braddish Billings Jr, who practised as an architect and served in the North-West Rebellion. His younger siblings were Samuel, Sarah (known as Sally) and Charles.

Billings was originally educated in law and in 1845, he was called to the Canadian bar. In 1856, he founded the journal the Canadian Naturalist (and Geologist). He continued to practise law until 1857, when he was hired to be the first paleontologist for Geological Survey of Canada (GSC). In his lifetime, he identified 1065 new species and 61 new genera, including Aspidella, the first documented fossil of the Ediacaran biota.

He married Helen Walker Wilson in 1845. However, he was childless.

== Bibliography ==
- Billings E. 1865. Palaeozoic Fossils. Volume I. Containing descriptions and figures of new or little known species of organic remains from the Silurian rocks, 1861-1865. Dawson Brothers, Montreal. Geological Survey of Canada, Separate Report, 426 pp.

Bibliography

- Gover, Nancy (1986), A brief history of the Billings family of Ottawa 1812-1975., Ottawa, Ontario: Billings Estate Museum
- Kitchen, Kevin (1996), Braddish Billings, Esquire, early Ottawa entrepreneur. Bytown pamphlet series., Ottawa, Ontario: The Historical Society of Ottawa
