= Braddish Billings =

- Born: September 23, 1783; Ware, Massachusetts
- Died: April 8, 1864 (aged 80)
- Resting place: Billings Estate, Ottawa, Canada
- Occupations: Farmer; lumberman
- Known for: Early settler in Ottawa
- Spouse: Lamira Dow (m. 1813)

Braddish Billings (September 23, 1783 – April 8, 1864) was an early settler in the Ottawa area, for whom the community of Billings Bridge was named.

He was born in Ware, Massachusetts in 1783, but moved to the Brockville area with his family when he was 9. He later worked cutting down white pine trees along the Ottawa River and transporting the logs down river. He also served on the Bytown Mechanics' Institute executive.

In 1812, Billings moved to the Ottawa area and settled on a farm south of the Rideau River in what was then the Township of Gloucester. In 1830, a bridge was built over the Rideau River near the Billings Farm to make it easier to transport produce into town.

== Family ==
He married Lamira Dow of Merrickville in 1813. The couple had nine children: Sabra, Cynthia, Lamira, Braddish II, Elkanah, Samuel, Sarah (Sally), Charles, Hiram, two of whom died: Cynthia and Hiram.

The couple's oldest son, Major Bradish Billings II (1847–1891), a pupil of architect Henry A. Sims in Philadelphia from 1863–1866, opened an architecture office in Ottawa in 1870 and later worked as a public servant with the Interior Department 1872-1885. Bradish Billings Jr. served in the North West Rebellion of 1885 and was promoted to major in 1892. W. Ross Billings also became an architect in the Ottawa area. Elkanah Billings became a naturalist and Canada's first paleontologist.

== Legacy ==
Billings died in 1864 and is buried on the Billings Estate which has been preserved as a historical site and museum. The Billings House, on the site, was built in 1829. The area where Billings had his farm and the nearby bridge over the river are now known as Billings Bridge.

The City of Ottawa owns and operates the former Billings family homestead as a museum and park located on over 8 acres (32,000 m^{2}) in Alta Vista. The site tells the story of the five generations of Billings family members who lived on the site before the municipality assumed ownership. The museum runs numerous programs for families throughout the year and operates a tea service on the lawn in the back gardens from May through August.
