= Church of the Ascension (Ottawa) =

- Church of the Ascension, Ottawa-- Christmas 2016

- Location of the church in southern Ontario
- 45°24′38.5″N 75°40′54″W
- Location: Ottawa, Ontario
- Country: Canada
- Denomination: Anglican Church of Canada
- Churchmanship: Broad church
- Website: www.churchoftheascension.ca

History
- Status: Church
- Founded: 1877
- Dedicated: 1920

Architecture
- Functional status: Active
- Style: Arts and Crafts
- Completed: 1916

Administration
- Province: Ontario
- Diocese: Ottawa

Clergy
- Bishop: Kathryn Otley
- Rector: Pending

Church of the Ascension is an Anglican church in Ottawa, Ontario, Canada.

== History ==
The original Anglican parish was established in 1877. To enable parishioners living west of the canal to get to church on Sundays, the parish kept a row boat and ferryman.

A new Arts and Crafts style church was built in 1916 and dedicated as Church of the Ascension in 1920. The features include Parish Hall and the stained glass windows, some of which were salvaged from the original church. The church participated in the 2012 Doors Open Ottawa.
