= Hindu Temple of Ottawa-Carleton =

Hindu temple in Canada

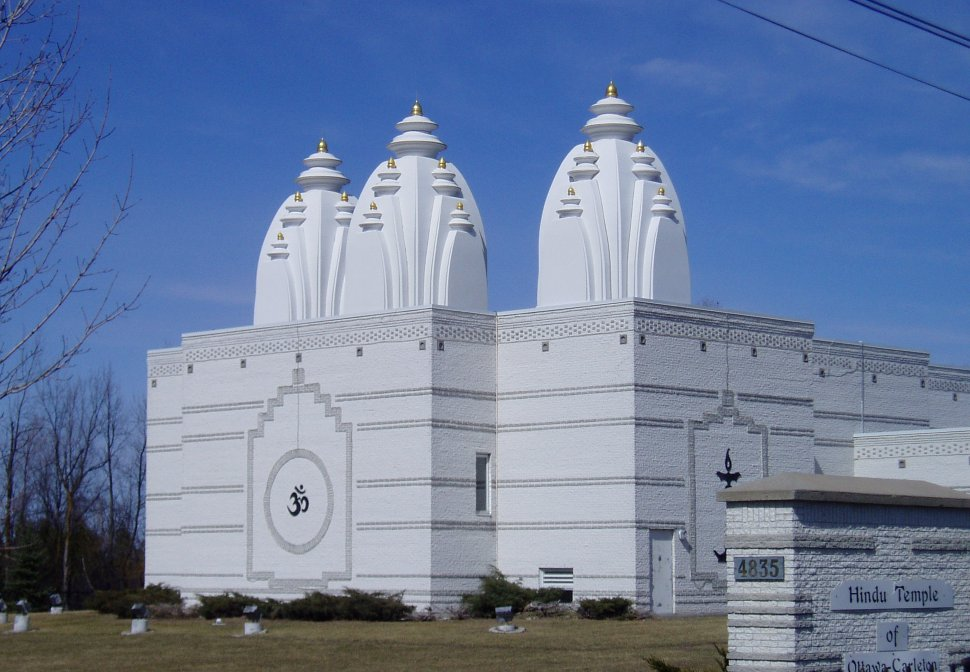
- Hindu Temple looking northeast

- Location in Ontario

Religion
- Affiliation: Hinduism
- District: Ottawa
- Province: Ontario
- Festivals: Holi, Janmaashtami, Navarathri, Diwali
- Governing body: 12 members

Location
- Location: 4835 Bank Street
- Country: Canada
- Interactive map of Hindu Temple of Ottawa-Carleton
- Coordinates: 45.310263°N 75.586807°W

Architecture
- Type: Hindu, adapted to Canadian weather
- Creator: Pandit Madhu Sahasrabudhe
- Completed: 1985
- Monument: 9 shrines

Website
- hindutemple.ca

Hindu Temple of Ottawa-Carleton is a significant Hindu temple in the Gloucester section of Ottawa.

For the first time, a Hindu temple in Eastern Ontario in 1985. The temple is located on Bank Street in the rural area to the south of urban Ottawa, south-east of the airport. The site, previously a cornfield, was purchased for the temple in 1984. The $4 million structure, funded by donations made by Canadian Hindus, was officially opened in 1989. It serves the estimated 6,000 Hindus who live in Ottawa, as well as acting as a community and cultural centre for the community with halls, libraries, and other resources. The temple follows traditional Hindu architectural styles, though compromises had to be made to adapt to the cold and weight of snow accumulation. The temple has nine shrines: Ganesha, Kartikeya, Krishna with Radha, Shiva, Lakshmi with Narayana, Rama with Sita and Lakshmana with Hanuman, Durga, Hanuman, and Nataraja.

The effort to build the temple was by Pandit Madhu Sahasrabudhe, a food science researcher who had also served as a priest in the city since 1960. Until his death in 2004 Sahasrabudhe also played an essential role in the community. He is the chair of the Capital Region Interfaith Council. In 2002, he led prayers at a multi-faith thanksgiving event with the Queen in attendance. He frequently appeared as part of the Ottawa Citizen's panel of local religious leaders.

== Main deities at the Temple ==
- Sri Ganesh
- Lord Subrahmanya
- Sri Krishna and Radha
- Lord Shiva
- Sri Lakshmi Narayan
- Sri Durga
- Sri Ram Parivar
- Sri Hanuman
- Sri Nataraja
- Nava Graha

== Major festivals celebrated ==
- Navratri
- Diwali
- Maha Shivratri
- Lohri
- Makar Sankranti/Pongal/Uttarayana
- Holi
- Sri Rama Navami/Sri Sita Rama Kalyanam
- Tulsi Vivah
- Karva Chauth
- Janmashtami

== See also ==
- World Hinduism
- Hinduism by country
- Hindu calendar
- List of Hindu temples
- Hindu deities
- List of Hindu deities
- List of Hinduism-related articles
- History of India
- Hindu scriptures
