= First Church of Christ, Scientist (Ottawa) =

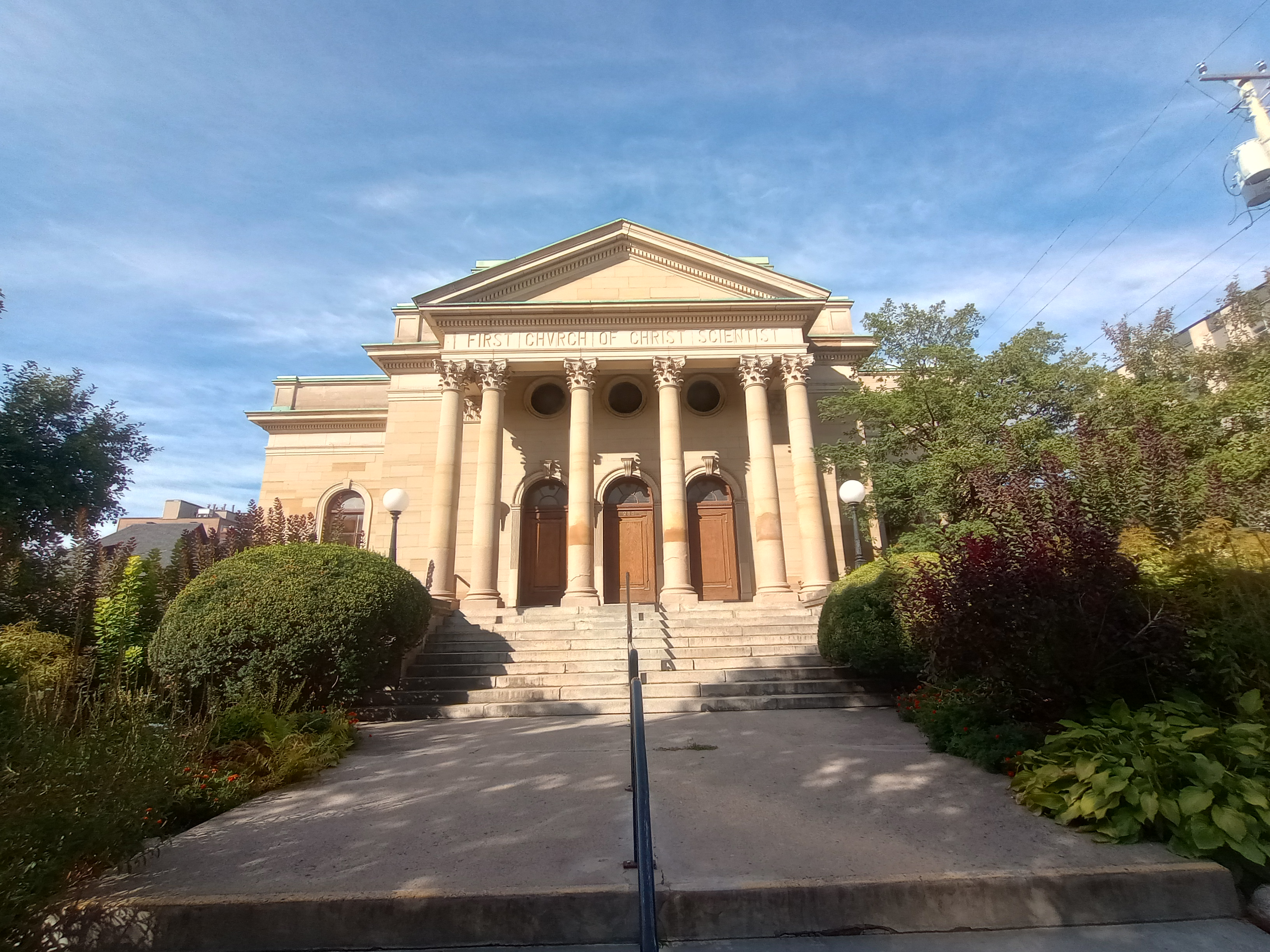
- First Church of Christ, Scientist, (Ottawa)
- First Church of Christ, Scientist (Ottawa)
- 45.415583°N 75.69116°W
- Location: 288 Metcalfe Street; Ottawa, Ontario; K2P 1R8
- Denomination: Christian Science

History
- Consecrated: 1914

Architecture
- Functional status: Active
- Architect: J.P. Maclaren,
- Architectural type: Italianate
- Style: Neoclassicism
- Groundbreaking: 1913

First Church of Christ, Scientist is a Christian Science church in Ottawa, Ontario, Canada.

== History ==
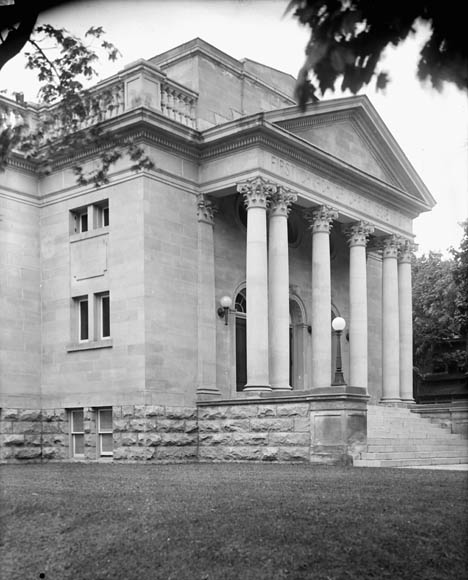
The church in 1915.

The church was first organized in 1899. Its current Italianate style building in Centretown was designed by John Pritchard MacLaren (architect) 1913–14. The church is one of only a few such buildings in Ottawa. The church maintains a Reading Room on Laurier Avenue in downtown Ottawa.

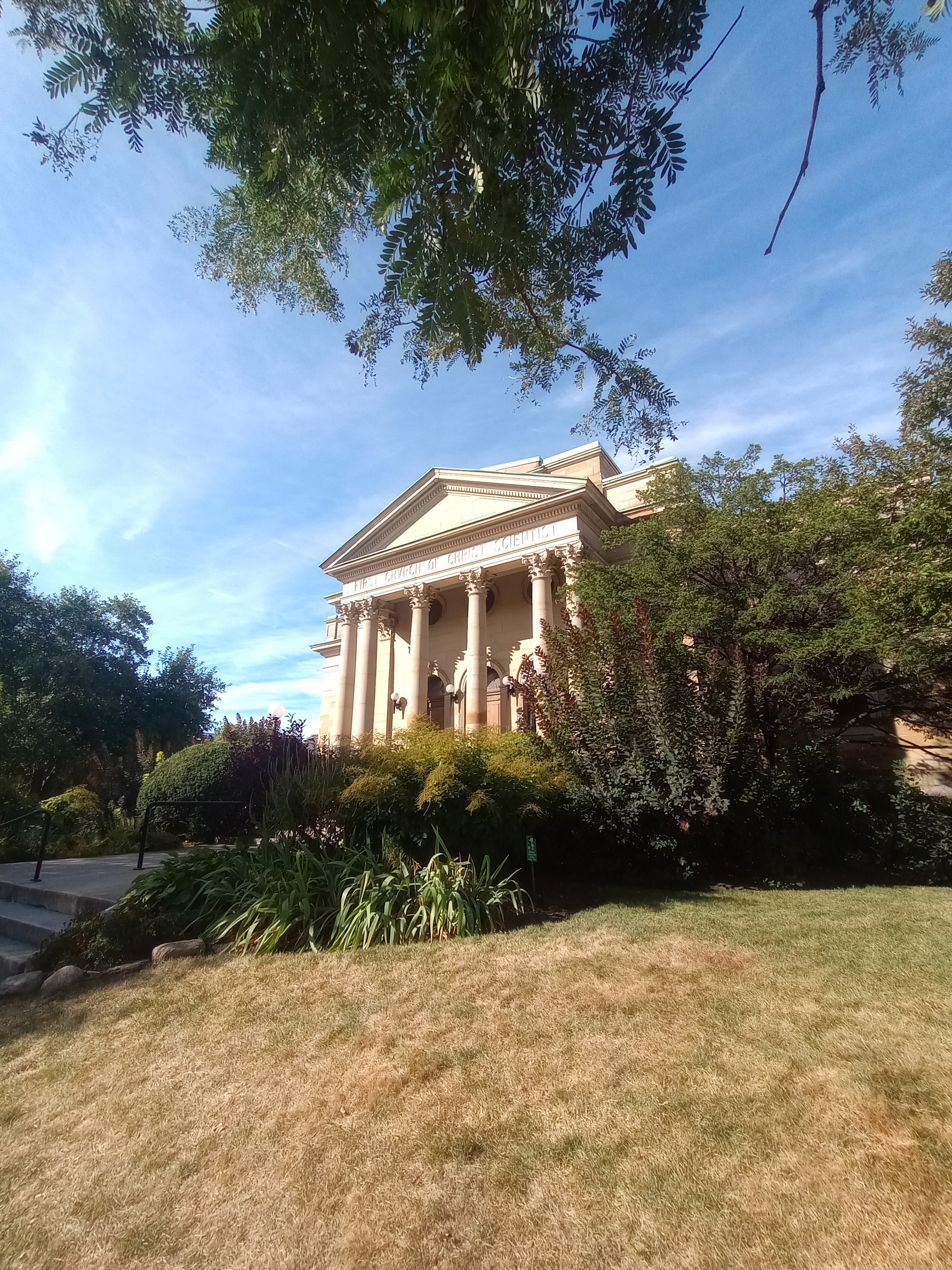
