= McMillan (agency) =

- Type: Private
- Industry: Integrated Marketing Communications
- Founded: 1996
- Headquarters: 150 Elgin Street, Ottawa, Ontario, Canada
- Key people: Gordon McMillan (Founder)

McMillan was a full-service creative agency based in Ottawa, Ontario, Canada. The agency provides brand strategy, creative development, and integrated marketing to business-to-business (B2B) and business-to-consumer (B2C) organizations.

== History ==
McMillan was founded in 1996 by Gordon McMillan, the agency has grown to service accounts throughout North America. Within six months of opening, McMillan landed accounts with Microsoft and Cognos. The following year it added several clients in the high-tech industry, including Oracle University, PeopleSoft, and Nortel Networks. Dun & Bradstreet (D&B) selected McMillan as a preferred marketing vendor in 2003 and McMillan became D&B's lead agency until 2010. McMillan closed its doors on July 31, 2026.

== Overview ==
The agency had relationships with Getty Images and American Greetings. In 2007, McMillan deepened its relationship with Canada Post, becoming its primary source for interactive and web services, as well as becoming a principle marketing partner for the Canadian Medical Association (CMA). In late 2007, McMillan closed its Vancouver office, which had been operating for 5 years, servicing mainly smaller, Vancouver-based accounts. In 2011, it closed its client services center in San Francisco, CA.

== Recognition ==
McMillan was named agency of record for Forest Products Association of Canada in 2004 and for Bridgewater Systems in 2005.

McMillan also was named agency of record for Sophos, a U.K.-based company specializing in email, web, and computer threat protection.

According to the Ottawa Business Journal, McMillan is one of Ottawa's largest marketing agencies.

== See also ==
- Rethink Communications
