= First Baptist Church (Ottawa) =

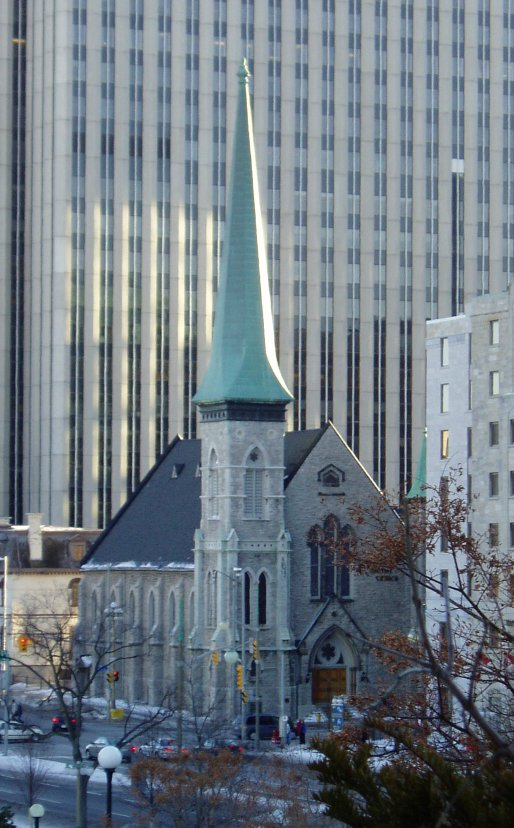
- First Baptist Church in Downtown Ottawa
- First Baptist Church (Ottawa)
- 45.420653°N 75.693281°W
- Location: 140 Laurier Avenue West; Ottawa, Ontario; K1P 5J4
- Denomination: Baptist
- Website: www.firstbaptistottawa.ca

Administration
- Division: Canadian Baptists of Ontario and Quebec

First Baptist Church is a Baptist church in Ottawa, Ontario, Canada. It is affiliated with the Canadian Baptists of Ontario and Quebec.

== History ==
The church was first founded in 1857, the first Baptist congregation in Ottawa. The current church, prominently located at 140 Laurier Avenue West, at the corner of Elgin Street and Laurier Avenue West in Downtown Ottawa, was designed by architect James Mather and constructed 1877-8.

The cornerstone was laid by then-Prime Minister, Alexander Mackenzie. As a Baptist, Mackenzie worshiped at the church when he was in Ottawa after services began in 1878.

The First Baptist Church Ottawa erected memorial plaques which are dedicated to the members of the Congregation who served and to those who gave their lives during the Great War.

The church was expanded in 1914, and significantly renovated in 1928.

The First Baptist Church Ottawa erected a memorial plaque which is dedicated to the members of the Congregation who gave their lives and those who served during the Second World War (1939-1945).

In 1966-1967, to celebrate Canada's Centennial, a massive organ was installed. From 1999 to 2002, significant restoration work was undertaken.

The congregation has remained in the downtown area, and over the years, supported the establishment of new congregations, including McPhail Memorial Baptist Church (1896), Fourth Avenue Baptist Church in The Glebe (1899), and more recently, Kanata Baptist Church and Bilberry Creek Baptist Church in Orleans.

== See also ==
- List of designated heritage properties in Ottawa
