= McPhail Memorial Baptist Church =

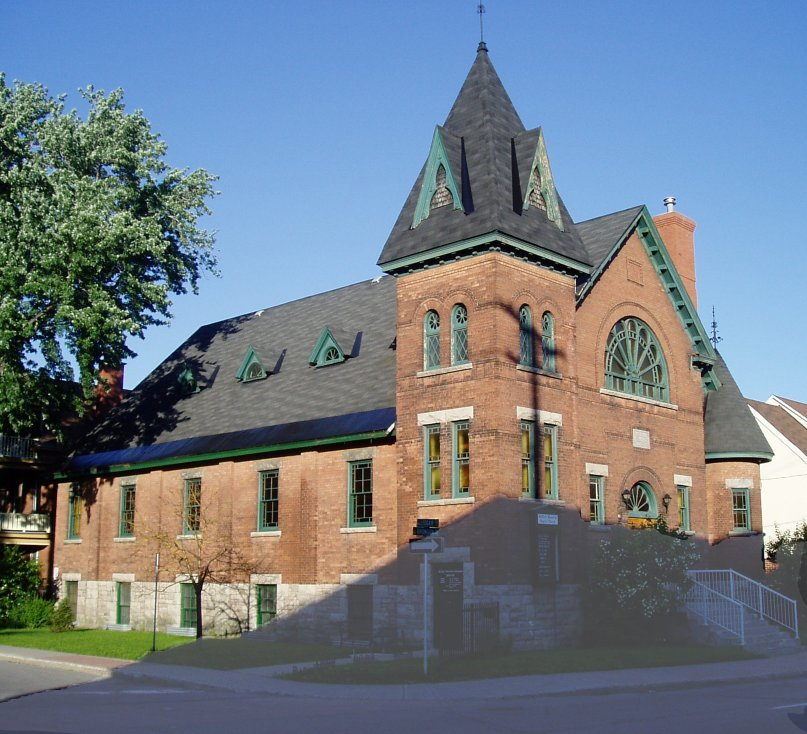
- McPhail Memorial Baptist Church
- McPhail Memorial Baptist Church
- 45°24′46.53″N 75°42′22.56″W
- Location: Bronson Avenue at Lisgar Street in the west of Downtown Ottawa, Ontario
- Country: Canada
- Denomination: Baptist

Architecture
- Functional status: Active
- Architectural type: Norman-Gothic

Administration
- Division: Canadian Baptists of Ontario and Quebec

McPhail Memorial Baptist Church is a Baptist church in Ottawa, Ontario, Canada. It is affiliated with Canadian Baptists of Ontario and Quebec.

== History ==
The church was founded in 1888 as an offshoot of First Baptist Church. Its current home was completed in 1893. It is one of Ottawa's best known examples of late-nineteenth century revivalist architecture. The church is named after Rev. Daniel McPhail who served as a minister and itinerant preacher in the Ottawa area for many decades.
