= Protection of the Holy Virgin Memorial Church =

- Protection of the Holy Virgin Memorial Church
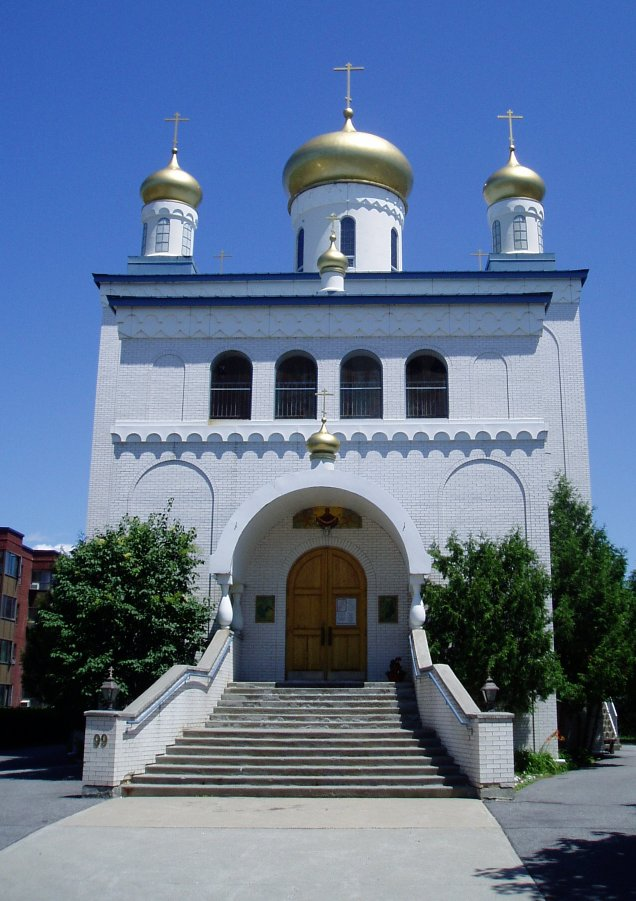
- Protection of the Holy Virgin Memorial Church
- Protection of the Holy Virgin Memorial Church
- 45.407019°N 75.727928°W
- Location: 99 Stonehurst Avenue; Ottawa, Ontario; K1Y 4R6
- Denomination: Russian Orthodox Church Outside Russia
- Website: www.memorialchurch.ca

Architecture
- Functional status: Active
- Architect: George M. Moiseyev

Administration
- Diocese: Montréal and Canada

Clergy
- Archbishop: Abp. Gabriel Chemodakov
- Priest: Father Alexis Pjawka

Protection of the Holy Virgin Memorial Church is a Russian Orthodox Church Outside Russia (ROCOR) church in Ottawa, Ontario, Canada. Designed by Ottawa architect George M. Moiseyev, who was also project architect for the Children's Hospital of Eastern Ontario, the church is located at 99 Stonehurst Avenue in the Mechanicsville area of Ottawa. It is part of the Montreal and Canada Diocese of ROCOR.

== History ==
The first Orthodox parish to be organized in Ottawa was the Holy Trinity Bukowinian Church. It was started in 1913 by a small group of immigrants from Bukovina who, on the feast of the Dormition of the Mother of God in 1918, consecrated the first Orthodox church in Ottawa. During the 1920s and 1930s, Holy Trinity Church was a place of worship for all Orthodox Christians in the Ottawa area. In the following decades, most of the various Orthodox ethnic groups organized their own parishes in the nation’s capital. Russians, however, continued to pray at the Bukowinian church as it was a member of the Eastern Canadian Diocese of the Russian Orthodox Church Outside of Russia.

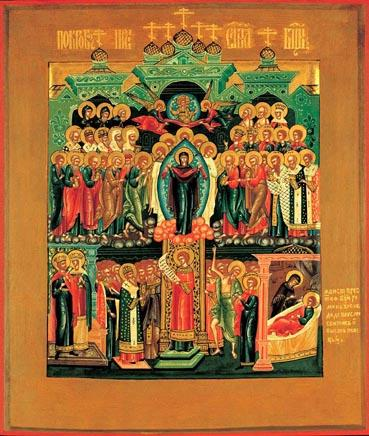
Icon of the Protection, 19th century, Russia Intercession of the Theotokos.

By the mid-sixties, the Russian community in Ottawa decided to organize its own Orthodox parish. With the blessing of Archbishop Vitaly (Ustinov) of Montreal and Canada, the Protection of the Virgin Mary parish opened in Ottawa on October 21, 1965. At first this new community met in the home of Claudia P. Gitalenko, one of the founding members of the parish. Visiting priest-monks from the St. Job of Pochaev brotherhood in Montreal served at the new church several times a month. Only two years after forming, the parish was able to buy a two-story house at 10 Arthur Street. The building was converted into a church, parish hall, and apartment for the rector. Fr. Theodore, one of the monks of the St. Job of Pochaev brotherhood, was active in furnishing the new church, with the help of the diocesan administration.

In 1968, Fr. Vladimir Chikanovsky was assigned as the first rector of the Protection parish. During his short stay, a sisterhood and parish school were organized. Fr. Vladimir was replaced as rector by Archimandrite Gregory Moiseevsky in May 1969. Although Fr. Gregory stayed only one year in Ottawa, he is remembered for his love of the church services and for his care in teaching the young people of the parish reading and singing on kliros. In 1970, Fr. Michael Milonow was assigned as the new rector, but was soon transferred to London, Ontario, after which Fr. Dimitri Sever became the parish priest.

By the end of the sixties it became clear that the recently purchased house-church was not sufficient for the needs of the community, and a search began for a building to replace it. In May 1970 the parish acquired a location at a former Protestant church at 267 Richmond Road. In the several months that followed, the interior of this building was completely rebuilt and decorated to make it suitable for Orthodox worship. Icons were painted by Kirill M. Kotkov for the newly built iconostasis. The exterior of the church was crowned with two Russian cupolas constructed and donated by the church warden from Montreal. For the next eighteen years this church was to be the centre of prayer and fellowship for the Russian Orthodox community in Ottawa. On October 18, 1970, only six months after its purchase, the church on Richmond Road was consecrated by Archbishop Vitaly. Frs. Theodore and Gregory, who had worked diligently to establish the parish, participated in the consecration.

In the early eighties the parish began exploring the possibility of building a large Russian Orthodox church to house the growing community. Soon it was decided to build not only a new church, but also a large senior citizens’ residence to house elderly Orthodox Christians who wished to live close to church. This ambitious project was dedicated as a monument to the upcoming 1000-year anniversary of the baptism of Russia.

In 1986 Fr. George Skrinnikow was assigned as the assistant rector. In the same year, a large piece of land was acquired at 89 and 99 Stonehurst Avenue for the construction of the future St. Vladimir’s Russian Seniors’ Residence and Holy Virgin Protection Church. Throughout the mid-1980s, Orthodox Christians from all over the world sent donations to help build the new church. St. Vladimir’s residence, with 65 apartments for seniors, was completed in 1987.

The newly built memorial church was consecrated on August 6, 1989, by Metropolitan Vitaly, Archbishop Laurus (Škurla) of Holy Trinity Monastery, and Archbishop Paul (Pavlov) of Australia who in the sixties, while still a priest-monk, had travelled from Montreal to serve at the newly organized Protection parish in Ottawa. In 1989 T. N. Vartanova was commissioned to paint the icons for the five-tiered iconostasis. The same year, St. Vladimir's Russian Residence run by the Memorial Church was opened. Both the provincial and federal governments helped finance it providing $3.7-million.

Fr. Dimitri was removed as the rector of the Protection of the Holy Virgin parish in September 1999. The following years proved difficult for the parish. In 2002, after several other priests had served as rectors, Fr. George Skrinnikow was assigned as the new parish priest and life began to return to normal. In 2004 Fr. Stelian Liabotis was assigned as the assistant rector and, in 2006 replaced Fr. George, who retired, as the senior priest. Under their guidance the parish school was reestablished and classes for adults organized. People were again catechized, baptized, and married. Work on the iconostasis resumed and was finally completed in 2011.

In 2013 Archbishop Gabriel (Chemodakov), the ruling bishop of the Canadian Diocese of the Russian Orthodox Church Outside of Russia and the rector of the parish assigned Fr. Alexis Pjawka as his assistant in Ottawa. For the past half century, the Protection of the Holy Virgin parish in Ottawa has served the Russian Orthodox community in Ottawa and southeastern Ontario. Former members of the parish include a bishop, a deacon, nuns, choir conductors, and seminarians, serving God in various parts of Canada. Today the parish is a multi-ethnic community with Orthodox Greeks, Serbs, Bulgarians, Ukrainians, Arabs, Romanians and Canadian converts joining with Russians from all three immigrations and their descendants to worship God.

Several charitable fundraisers are held by the church throughout the year. In the spring, the parish hosts a Blini. Since October 2012, the parish has held its annual Taste of Russia Festival in which local artists present a variety of performances and wares including traditional Russian dance, paintings, and genuine Russian products. The licensed event provides a unique opportunity in Ottawa for attendants to purchase Russian beverages and homemade Russian cuisine.
