= St. John the Baptist Ukrainian Catholic National Shrine =

Coordinates: 45°22′35″N 75°42′12″W

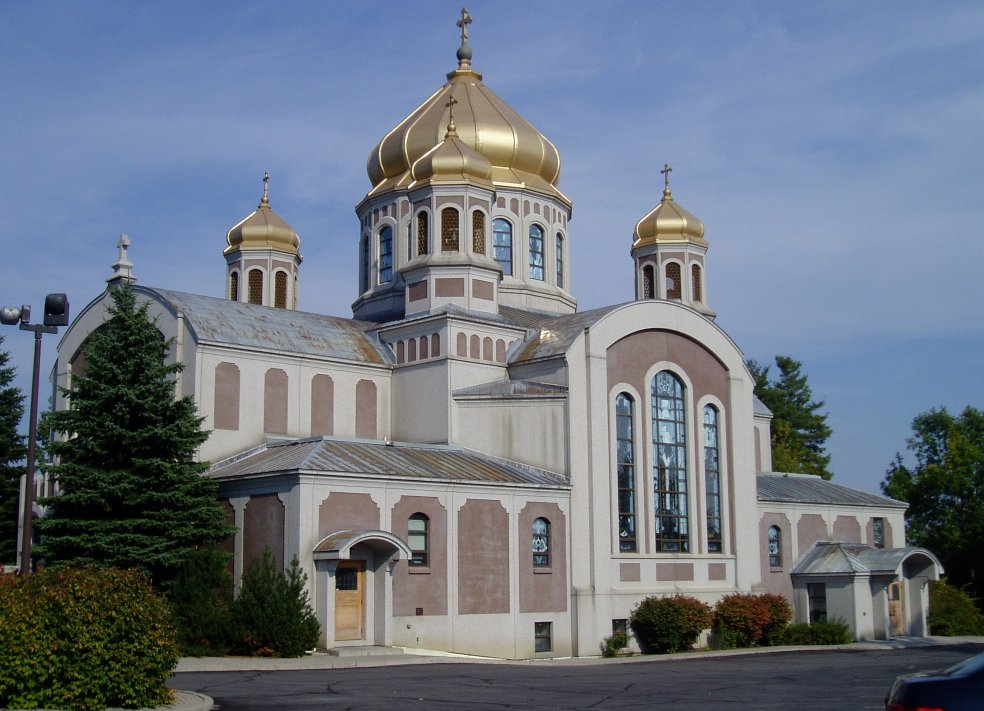
- St. John the Baptist Ukrainian Catholic National Shrine
- St. John the Baptist Ukrainian Catholic National Shrine
- Location: Ottawa, Ontario
- Country: Canada
- Denomination: Ukrainian Greek Catholic

Architecture
- Functional status: Active
- Architectural type: Norman-Gothic

St. John the Baptist Ukrainian Catholic National Shrine is a prominent Ukrainian Catholic church in Ottawa, Ontario, Canada.

== History ==
The only Ukrainian Catholic parish in the Ottawa region, the St. John the Baptist parish first formed in 1914. After meeting in other parishes' churches for some years, in 1918 the parish purchased a building to the west of downtown and converted it into a church.

The congregation of St. John the Baptist Ukrainian Catholic Church erected a memorial scroll which is dedicated to the memory of the members of this Parish who served during the Second World War.

In 1966 it moved into a temporary building on Carling Avenue. It was planned to build a permanent church on that site, but the location proved too small.

The current church was built in 1987. It is located near the intersection of Baseline Road and Prince of Wales Drive, overlooking the Rideau Canal and Carleton University. The ornate structure in Konstantin Thon's Neo-Byzantine style, was in part built to celebrate the millennium of the Baptism of Kiev. The artworks (icons and stained glass windows) within were done by five artists from Ukraine. Despite being only a parish church, due to its national status it was granted the title of Sobor. The church is owned and operated by the Basilians.
