= Westminster Presbyterian Church (Ottawa) =

Coordinates: 45.3886°N 75.7557°W

- Westminster Presbyterian Church (Ottawa)
- Location: Ottawa, Ontario
- Country: Canada
- Denomination: Presbyterian

Architecture
- Functional status: Active
- Architectural type: Norman-Gothic

Westminster Presbyterian Church is a member of the Presbyterian Church in Canada located in Ottawa, Ontario, Canada.

It is situated on the west side of Roosevelt Avenue in the Westboro neighbourhood of Ottawa.

== History ==
The architect Allan Keefer designed the Westminster Presbyterian Church, Lyon Street at MacLaren Street in 1911.
