= Minto Metropole =

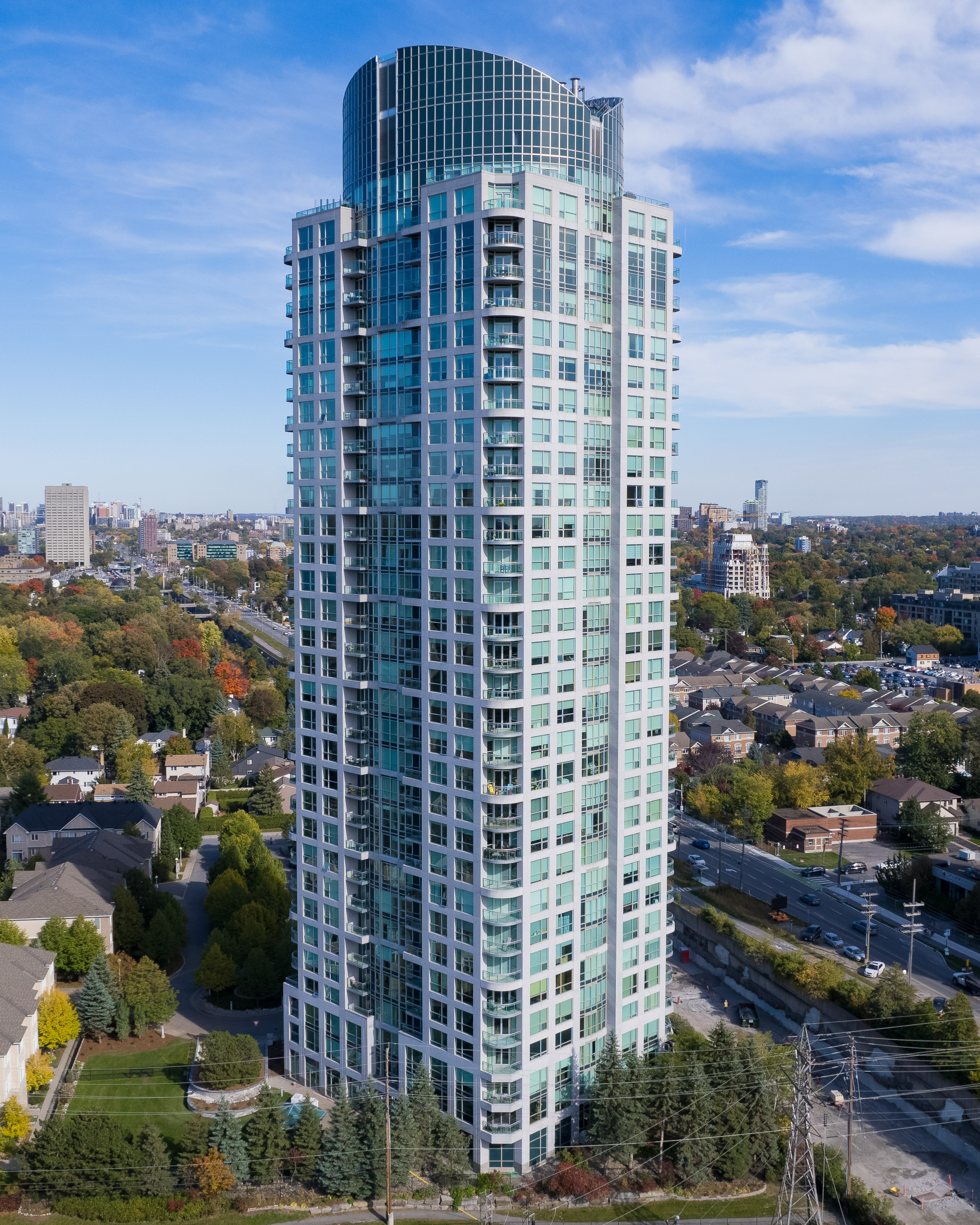
- The Minto Metropole
- Interactive map of the Minto Metropole area

General information
- Type: Residential condominium
- Architectural style: Postmodern
- Location: Ottawa, Ontario, Canada, 38 Metropole Private
- Coordinates: 45°23′51″N 75°45′02″W
- Construction started: 9 January 2003
- Completed: 2004
- Owner: Minto Group

Height
- Height: 108 m (354 ft)

Technical details
- Structural system: Steel and concrete
- Floor count: 33

References
- Minto Metropole, Ottawa | Emporis.com

The Minto Metropole is a 33-story residential building in the Westboro neighbourhood of Ottawa, Ontario. At 108 metres (354 ft), it is the third-tallest building in Ottawa, after Claridge Icon and Place de Ville Tower C. It is the second-tallest residential building in the National Capital Region.

The Minto Metropole is located on the near western side of the city on Island Park Drive, overlooking the Ottawa River, and within walking distance of Westboro Station. Opened in 2004, the postmodern tower is home to 153 condominiums. Originally, Minto planned to build a series of shorter towers along the waterfront, but residents complained that such a project would completely obscure their view of the river. As a result, Minto proposed building a single tall but slim tower, and city council approved the necessary rezoning.

== See also ==
- List of tallest buildings in Ottawa-Gatineau
