= Terrasses de la Chaudière =

Complex of government office buildings in Gatineau, Quebec, Canada

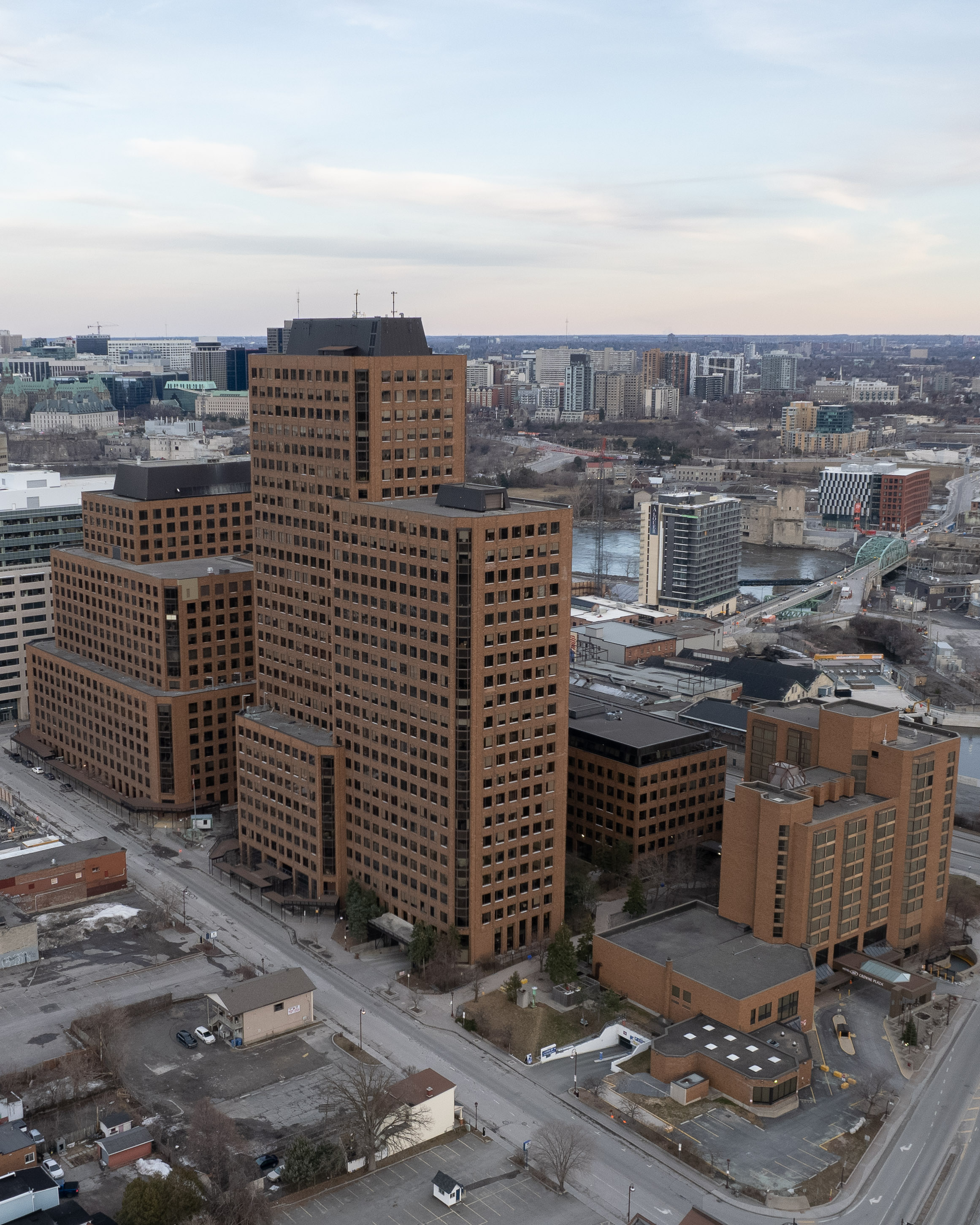
- Terrasses de la Chaudière
- Interactive map of the Terrasses de la Chaudière area

General information
- Type: Office complex
- Location: 15, rue Eddy; Gatineau, Quebec; J8X 4B3
- Coordinates: 45°25′32″N 75°43′16″W
- Current tenants: Crown–Indigenous Relations and Northern Affairs Canada; Indigenous Services Canada; Department of Canadian Heritage; Canadian Transportation Agency; Canadian Radio-television and Telecommunications Commission; Employment and Social Development Canada; Shared Services Canada; Public Services and Procurement Canada; Women and Gender Equality Canada
- Completed: 1978

Design and construction
- Architect: Le Groupe Arcop
- Developer: Robert Campeau

The Terrasses de la Chaudière (French pronunciation: [letɛʁas də la ʃodjɛʁ]) is a complex of government office buildings in Gatineau, Quebec, Canada. The complex was built in 1978 as part of Prime Minister Pierre Trudeau's initiative to see more federal workers based in the Quebec side of the Ottawa River. It was built by developer Robert Campeau and then leased to the government. This arrangement caused some controversy as Campeau had close links to the governing Liberals. The complex was named after the nearby Chaudière Falls in the Ottawa River.

Today, its three towers hold some 6,500 federal government office workers. The complex houses the headquarters of Crown–Indigenous Relations and Northern Affairs Canada (North Building), the headquarters of Indigenous Services Canada (North Building and Central Building), the headquarters of the Department of Canadian Heritage (Jules Léger Building (South)), the headquarters of the Canadian Transportation Agency (Jules Léger Building (South)), the headquarters of the Canadian Radio-television and Telecommunications Commission (CRTC) (Central Building), and other government entities. The centre also holds a shopping complex, a hotel, and a convention centre.

The North Building of the complex is the second-tallest building in the National Capital Region, with 30 floors and a height of 124 metres (407 ft). It is surpassed only by the Claridge Icon which stands at a height of 143 meters (469 ft).

== See also ==
- List of tallest buildings in Ottawa–Gatineau
