= Chinatown, Ottawa =

Chinatown
- Business Improvement Area (BIA)
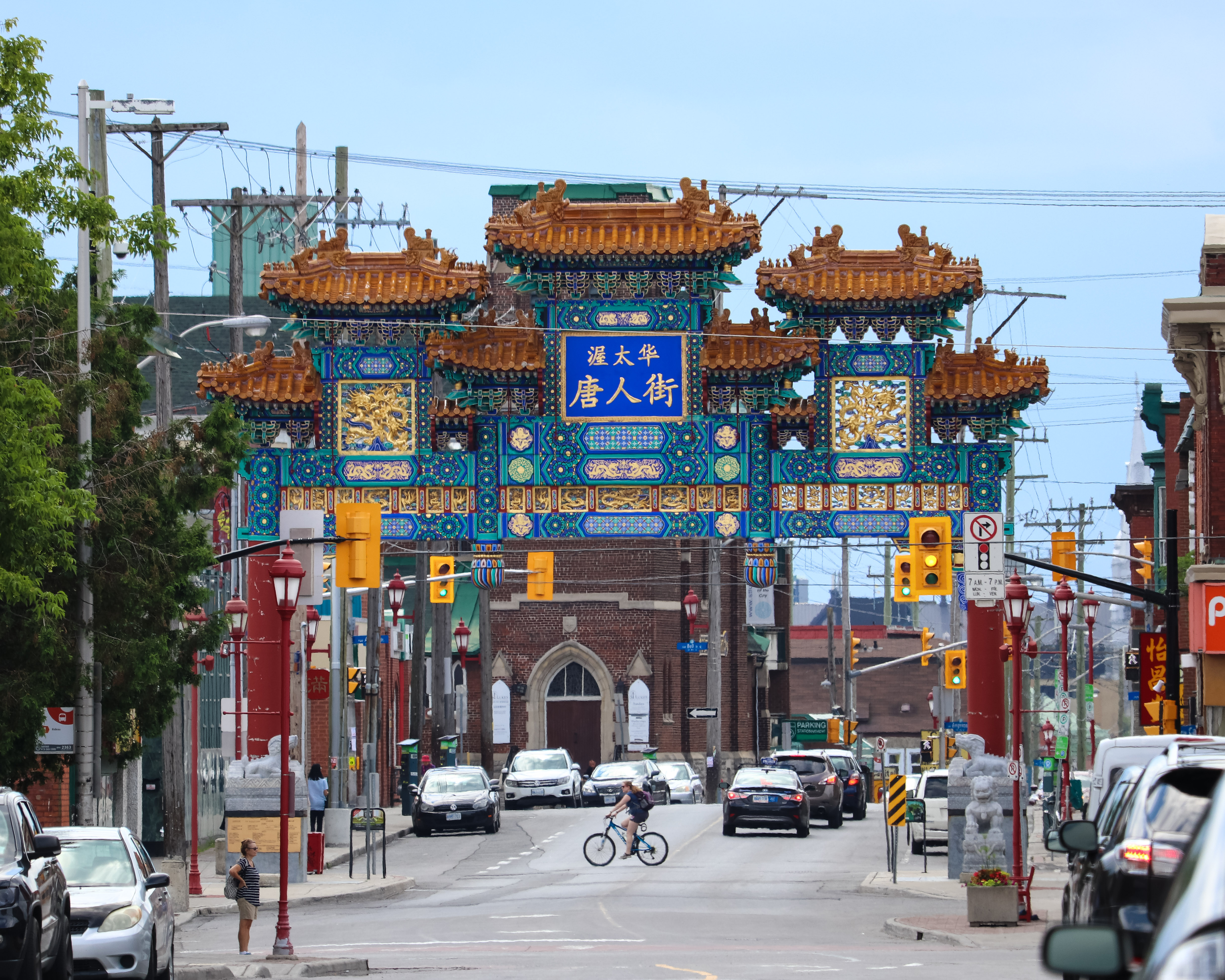
- Interactive map of Chinatown
- Coordinates: 45°24′39″N 75°42′26″W
- Country: Canada
- Province: Ontario
- City: Ottawa

Ottawa's Chinatown is located along Somerset Street west of downtown Ottawa. It runs from Bay Street in the east to Preston Street in the west (according to the Chinatown BIA). Signs for Chinatown continue along Somerset until Preston Street, and Chinese/Asian restaurants can be found even farther west.

The BIA was designated in 1989 and was named Somerset Heights until it was renamed Chinatown in 2005.

While officially designated "Chinatown," the area is home to businesses from many Asian cultures, such as Vietnamese, Korean and Thai. Restaurants specializing in Phở and dim sum are quite common. The Ottawa Chinatown has on one hand an urban character as it is not a cluster of strip malls, but on the other hand, it is focused on one commercial street, surrounded exclusively by residential areas.

A traditional Paifang archway has been built upon the entrance to the western section of Chinatown over Somerset Street, west of Bronson Avenue. It was unveiled in the early Fall of 2010.

== History ==
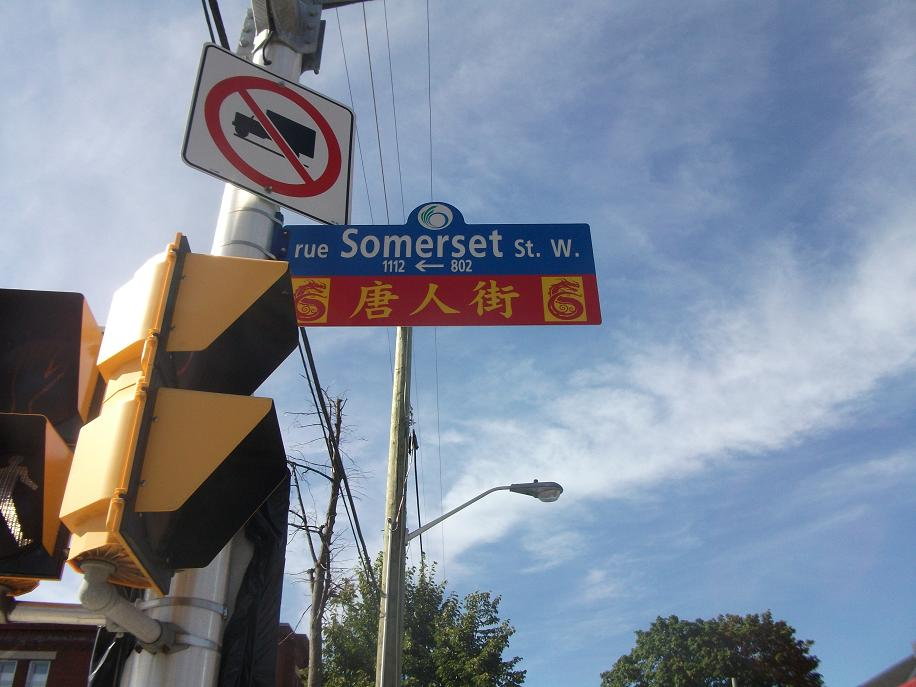
Signs for Somerset Street in Chinatown have Chinese subscript.

Although Chinese had been in Ottawa in the early part of the 20th century (first census reporting Chinese residents in 1911), the official existence of Chinatown began in 1931 on Albert Street from Kent Street to O'Connor Street. This first Chinatown began to decline beginning in the 1940s and ceased to exist on Albert Street by the 1970s, but the second and current Chinatown had begun to rise in the 1960s on Somerset Street West and finally displaced the old area by 1982.

== See also ==
- Little Italy, Ottawa
