= Place du Portage =

Office building complex in Gatineau, Quebec

Coordinates: 45°25′32″N 75°42′46″W

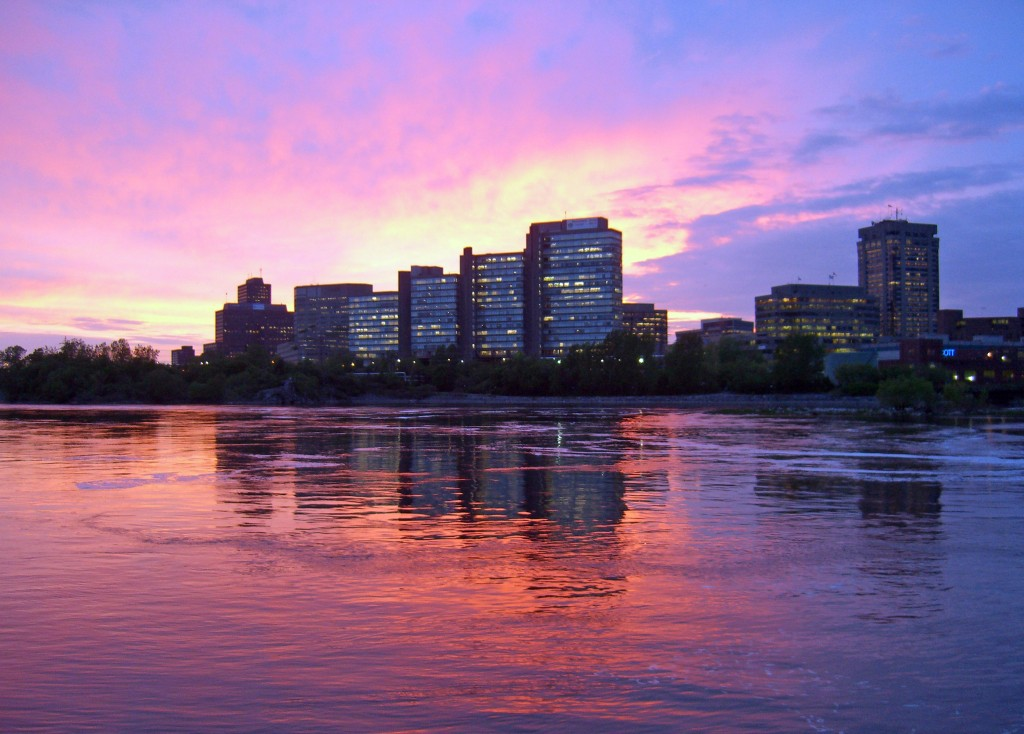
The Place du Portage complex facing the Ottawa River.

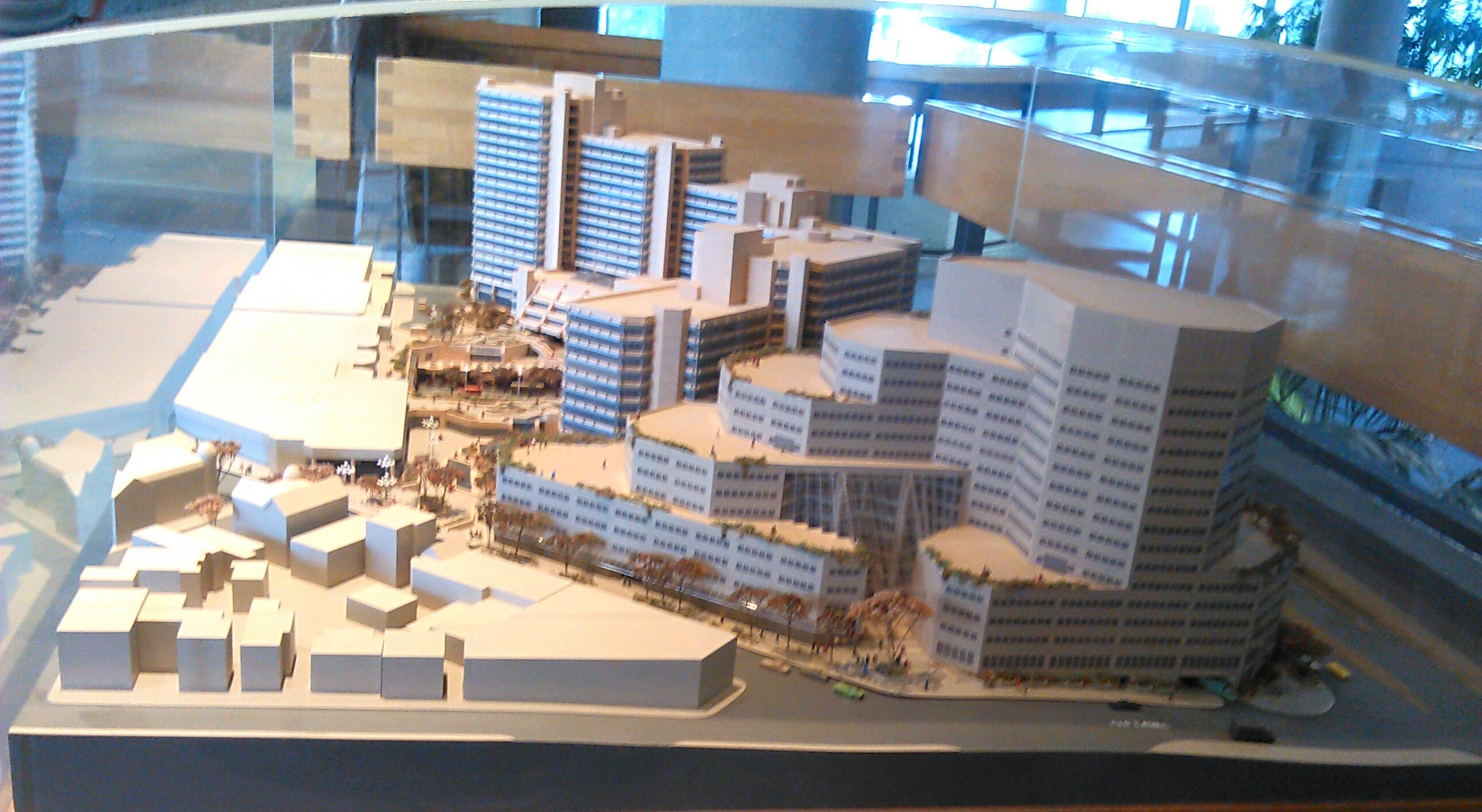
The Place du Portage model on display in the main lobby 2014

Place du Portage is a large office complex in the Hull sector of Gatineau, Quebec, Canada, situated along Boulevard Maisonneuve and facing the Ottawa River. It is owned and occupied by the Federal Government of Canada.

Place du Portage consists of four phases which were built in different stages during the 1970s and early 80s. The office complex was built in order to revitalize Hull's decaying downtown core and also to increase the proportion of the federal workforce in the overall National Capital Region. Although the installation of thousands of jobs in the Hull and Gatineau area has resulted in significant economic benefits to local businesses and the real estate market, some people feel that the complex has transformed downtown Hull in some negative ways. Much of the old downtown core was replaced with a series of massive towers and approximately 4,000 residents and businesses were displaced in the area that was once the town's main commercial area.

The whole complex (Place du Portage I, II, III, IV and Place d'Accueil) accommodates approximately 10,000 office workers. That makes Place du Portage the biggest office complex in the National Capital Region. Pedestrian bridges to city hall, which in turn has a pedestrian bridge to a hotel, makes this the center of a mini-"underground city".

Connected to and situated between Phase II and III is Place du Centre, a retail and office complex with a 28,600 m^{2} (308,000 sq ft) shopping mall on the lower floors and nine floors of office space, for a total area of 43,000 square metres (460,000 sq ft). Although it houses the Federal Government's Foreign Affairs, Trade and Development Canada (DFATD) on floors 4 through 12, it is commercially owned and operated, and not part of Place du Portage.

== Place du Portage I ==
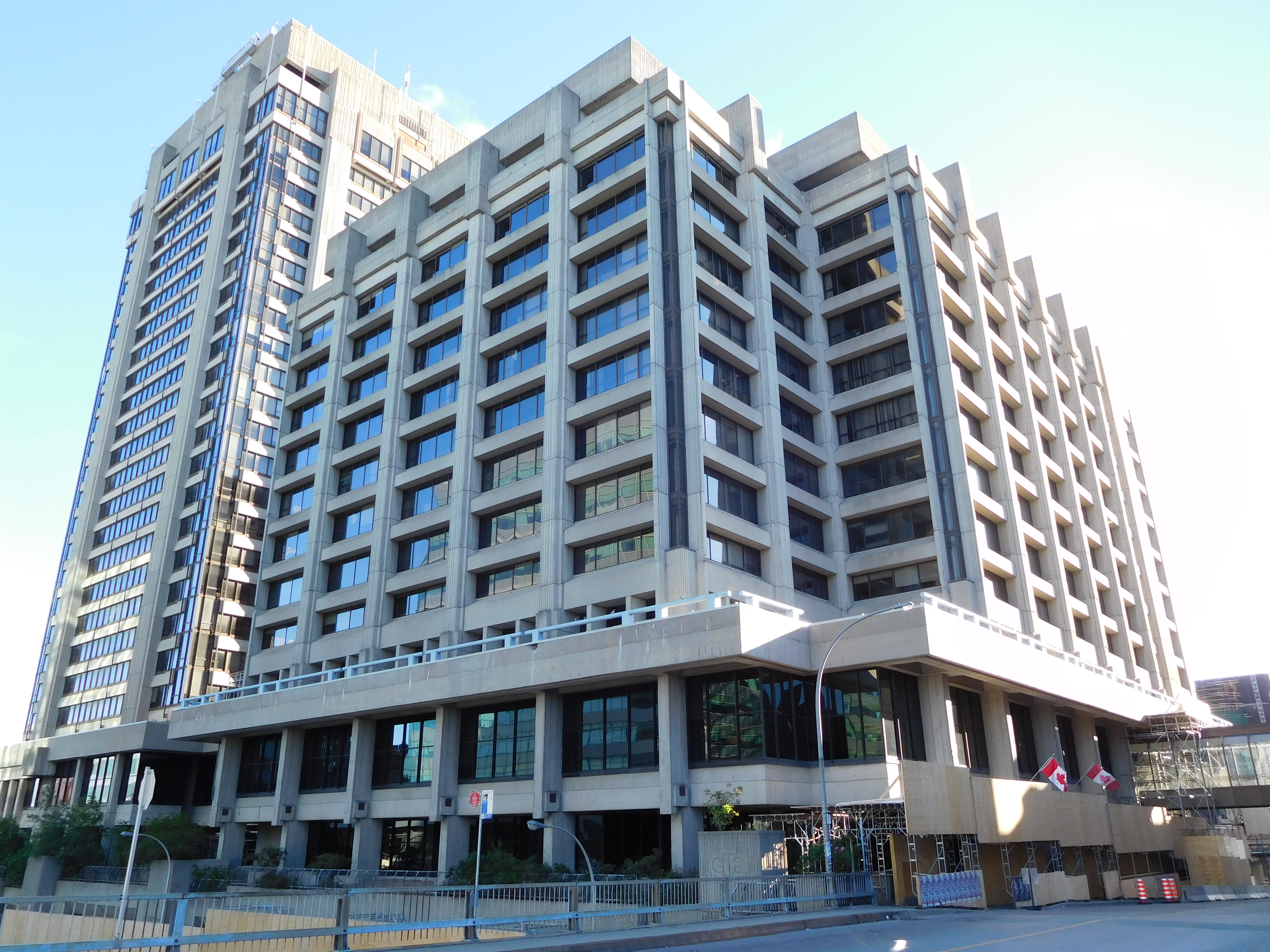
Place du Portage I & II

Place du Portage I is the second tallest office tower in Hull, after Terrasses de la Chaudière. It has 25 floors, is 101 metres (331 ft) high, and completed in 1973, with an approximate gross surface area of 38,000 square metres (410,000 sq ft).

Place du Portage I accommodates approximately 1,200 office workers, between the Canadian Intellectual Property Office, and the Competition Bureau.

== Place du Portage II ==
Place du Portage II is adjacent to Portage I and was completed in 1975. Including underground parking, shopping, mezzanine, and mechanical levels, there are altogether 18 levels, 10 of which are office floors, with an approximate gross surface area of 24,000 square metres (260,000 sq ft).

Place du Portage II accommodates approximately 800 office workers. Additionally, the two-level commercial area has a total area of 11,000 square metres (120,000 sq ft).

== Place du Portage III ==
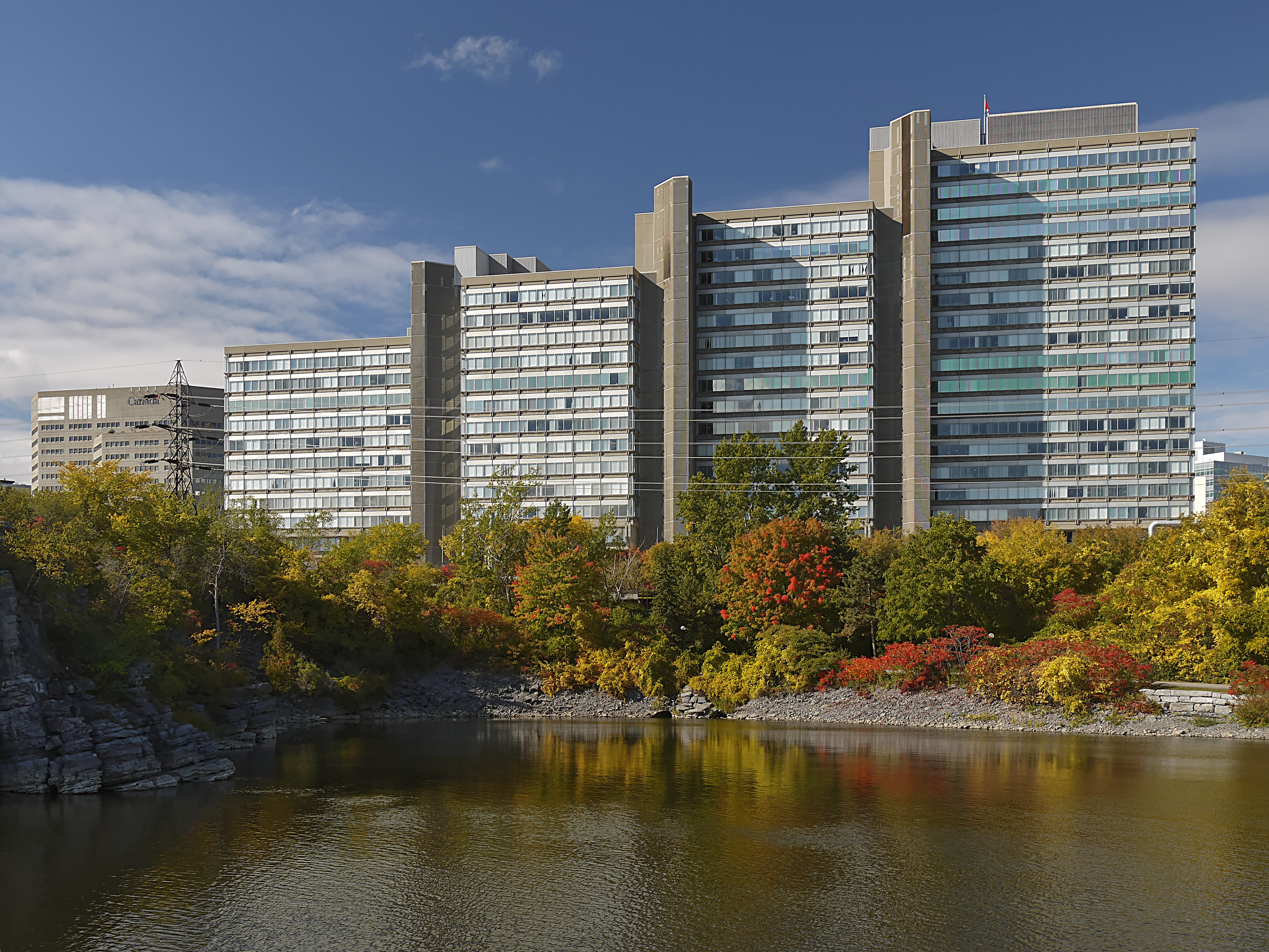
Portage III

Place du Portage III consists of 6 connected towers of different heights, spanning both sides of Boulevard Maisonneuve, with an approximate gross surface area of 247,000 square metres (2,660,000 sq ft), making it the largest of the 4 phases. The tallest section is 18 floors above grade with another 5 below-grade levels. It was completed in 1978.

Place du Portage III accommodates approximately 4,500 office workers, mostly Public Services and Procurement Canada staff.

In 2000, Phase III was named by the Royal Architectural Institute of Canada as one of the top 500 buildings produced in Canada during the last millennium.

Starting in 2018, Place du Portage III is undergoing a midlife rehabilitation project that will renew its entire interior, including the electrical, plumbing, and HVAC systems, as well as the building envelope. The project is budgeted to cost CA$1.6 billion and to take 10 years to complete, done in 2 phases. Perkins&Will are the lead consultants, with EllisDon as general contractor.

== Place du Portage IV ==
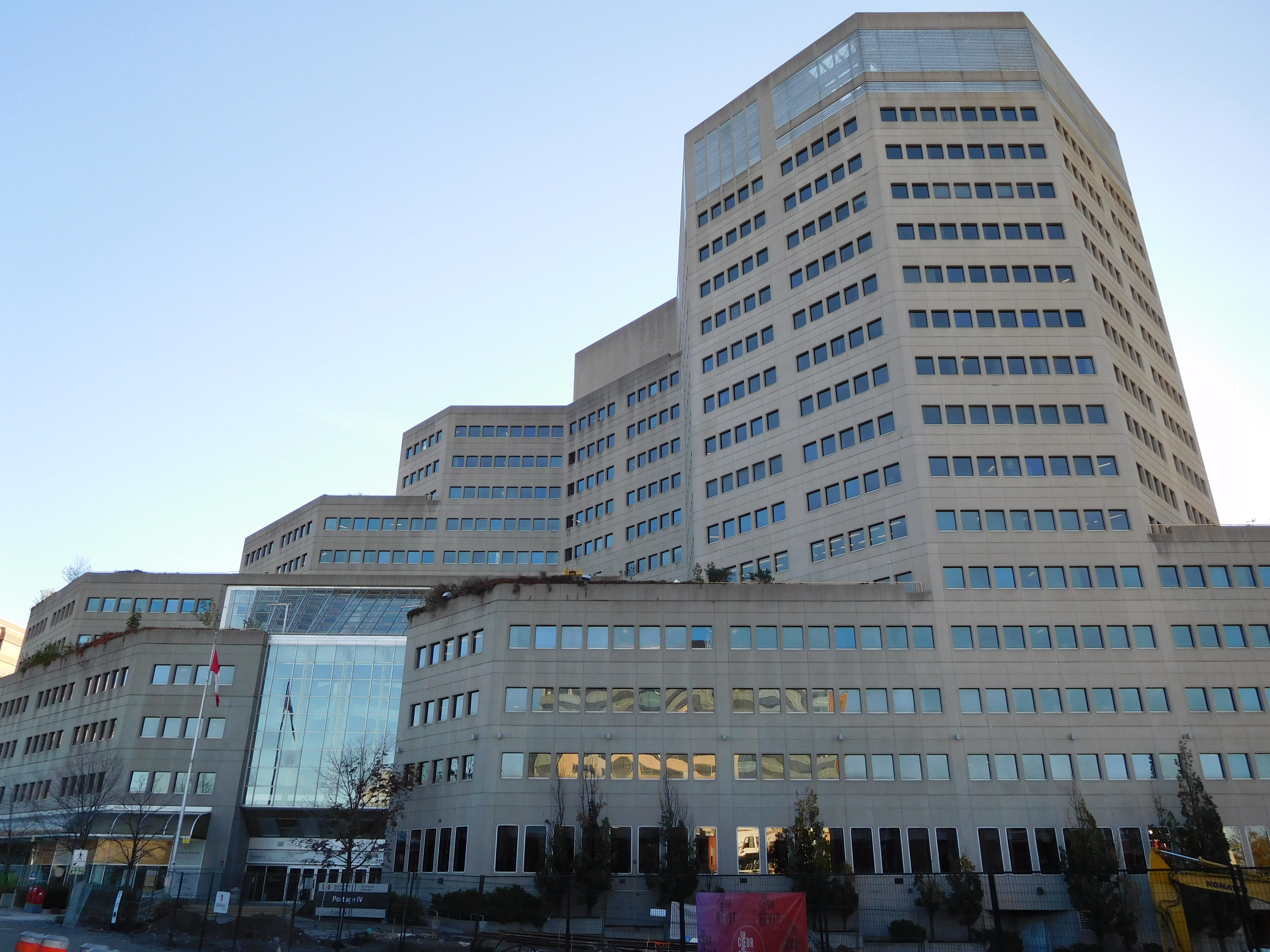
Portage IV

Place du Portage IV is the latest phase, completed in 1979. Including underground parking, shopping, mezzanine, and mechanical levels, there are altogether 20 levels in a step-up design, with an approximate gross surface area of 118,000 square metres (1,270,000 sq ft).

Place du Portage IV accommodates approximately 3,500 office workers, almost exclusively Employment and Social Development Canada staff (which includes Service Canada staff).

== See also ==
- List of tallest buildings in Ottawa–Gatineau
