= Ottawa Marriott Hotel =

Hotel in Ottawa, Canada

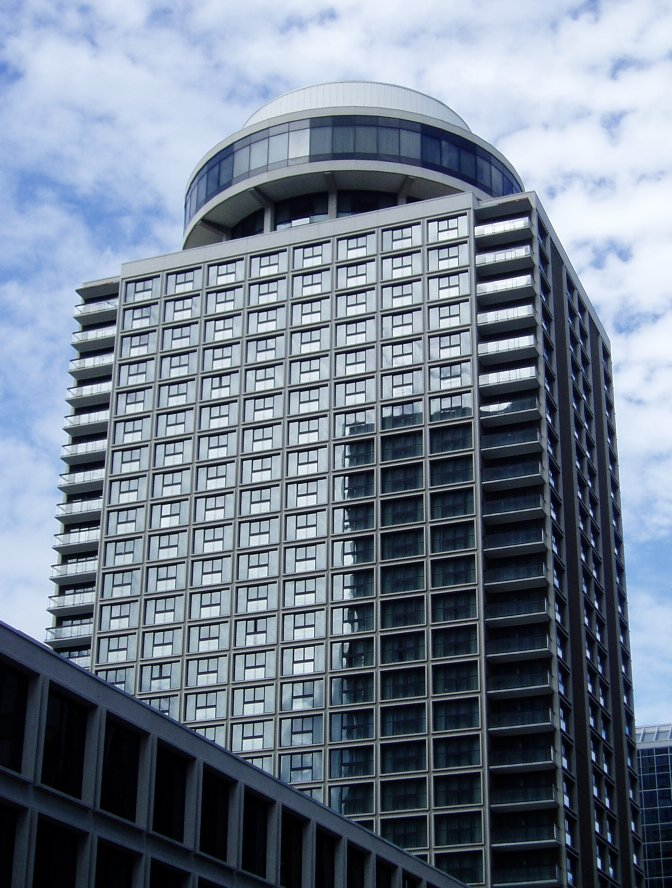
- The Ottawa Marriott Hotel
- Interactive map of the Ottawa Marriott Hotel area

General information
- Location: 100 Kent Street; Ottawa, Ontario; K1P 5R7
- Coordinates: 45.41972°N 75.70341°W
- Groundbreaking: 1971
- Opened: 1972
- Owner: InnVest Hotels
- Operator: InnVest Hotels Management Limited

Height
- Height: 96.3 m (315.9 ft)

Technical details
- Floor count: 26

Design and construction
- Architect: Campeau Corporation

Other information
- Number of rooms: 489

Website
- Official website

The Ottawa Marriott Hotel is a hotel located in Ottawa, Ontario, Canada, on the northwest corner of the intersection of Queen Street and Kent Street in downtown Ottawa. It is the 8th tallest building in Ottawa and 10th tallest building in the National Capital Region. The hotel is well known for the revolving room on its roof.

The Ottawa Marriott Hotel is located in the city's downtown core and is walking distance from Parliament Hill, Château Laurier, Rideau Canal, Rideau Centre, Shaw Centre, and the National Gallery of Canada. The hotel comprises 489 guestrooms, 26,000 sq ft (2,400 m^{2}) of meeting space, a fitness centre, indoor pool and a children's activity area.

During its construction in 1971, the structure was briefly the tallest building in Ottawa until the neighbouring Place de Ville Tower C surpassed it during its construction. The hotel opened in 1972 as the Holiday Inn Ottawa Centre. It was later operated by Radisson Hotels as the Radisson Hotel Ottawa Centre, before being taken over by Marriott Hotels & Resorts. In 2010, the building underwent significant renovations to the main floor. The top floor restaurant, Merlot Rooftop Grill (originally called La Ronde) closed and re-opened as Summit, a private event space. Summit remains the only revolving room in Ottawa, rotating at a rate of approximately one revolution per two hours. The main floor renovations included closing Cafe Toulouse, their street-level restaurant and re-opening as "spin" Kitchen & Bar. In 2023, it was sold by Toronto-based InnVest Hotels to Manga Hotels Group, another Toronto firm.

== See also ==
- List of tallest buildings in Ottawa–Gatineau
