= St. Anthony of Padua (Ottawa) =

Coordinates: 45.40576°N 75.7080°W

St. Anthony of Padua Church
- Sant' Antonio di Padova
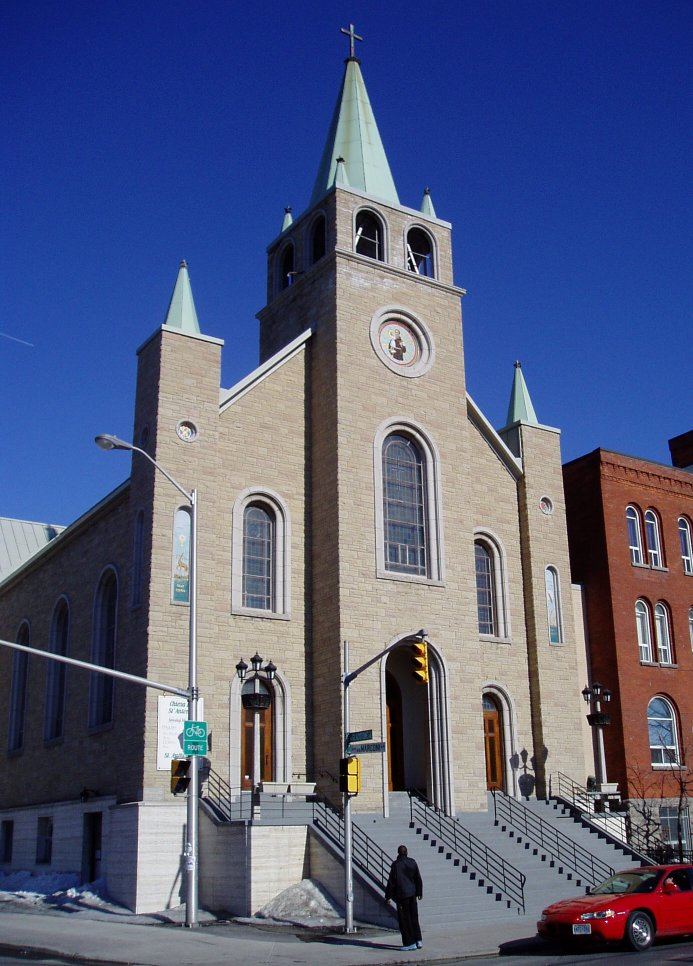
- St Anthony of Padua Church
- St. Anthony of Padua Church
- Location: 427 Booth Street; Ottawa, Ontario; K1R 7K8
- Denomination: Roman Catholic
- Website: Parish Website

History
- Dedication: St Anthony

Administration
- Province: Ecclesiastical province of Ottawa
- Diocese: Archdiocese of Ottawa

St. Anthony of Padua is a Roman Catholic church at 427 Booth Street in Ottawa, Ontario, Canada, in the heart of Little Italy.

== History ==
Founded in 1908 by Father Fortunatus Mizzi O.F.M. Cap., a Maltese priest, the first church was a small chapel, but burnt down in 1913. Another church, designed by Guido Nincheri, was erected in 1913 to replace it. This structure was completed in 1925, however it was severely damaged by a fire just four years later. It was again rebuilt, this time with very little wood.

The church has long been the social centre of the Italian-Canadian community in Ottawa. Across the street is St. Anthony's School, a Catholic elementary school. The church is also the base for the St. Anthony Italia Soccer Club, one of Ottawa's most competitive amateur soccer teams. In front of the church is Piazza Dante where major social events are held. The largest of these is Italian Week, which attracts several thousand people and occurs every June beginning with the Feast of St. Anthony.
