= List of tallest buildings in Ottawa–Gatineau =

Skyline of Ottawa Ottawa—Gatineau
- Downtown Ottawa in August 2026
- Cities included: Ottawa, Gatineau
- Tallest building: Claridge Icon (2022)
- Tallest building height: 143 m (469 ft)
- Major clusters: Downtown/Centretown; Little Italy; Hull; ByWard Market; See more

Number of tall buildings (2026)
- Taller than 75 m (246 ft): 90
- Taller than 100 m (328 ft): 8

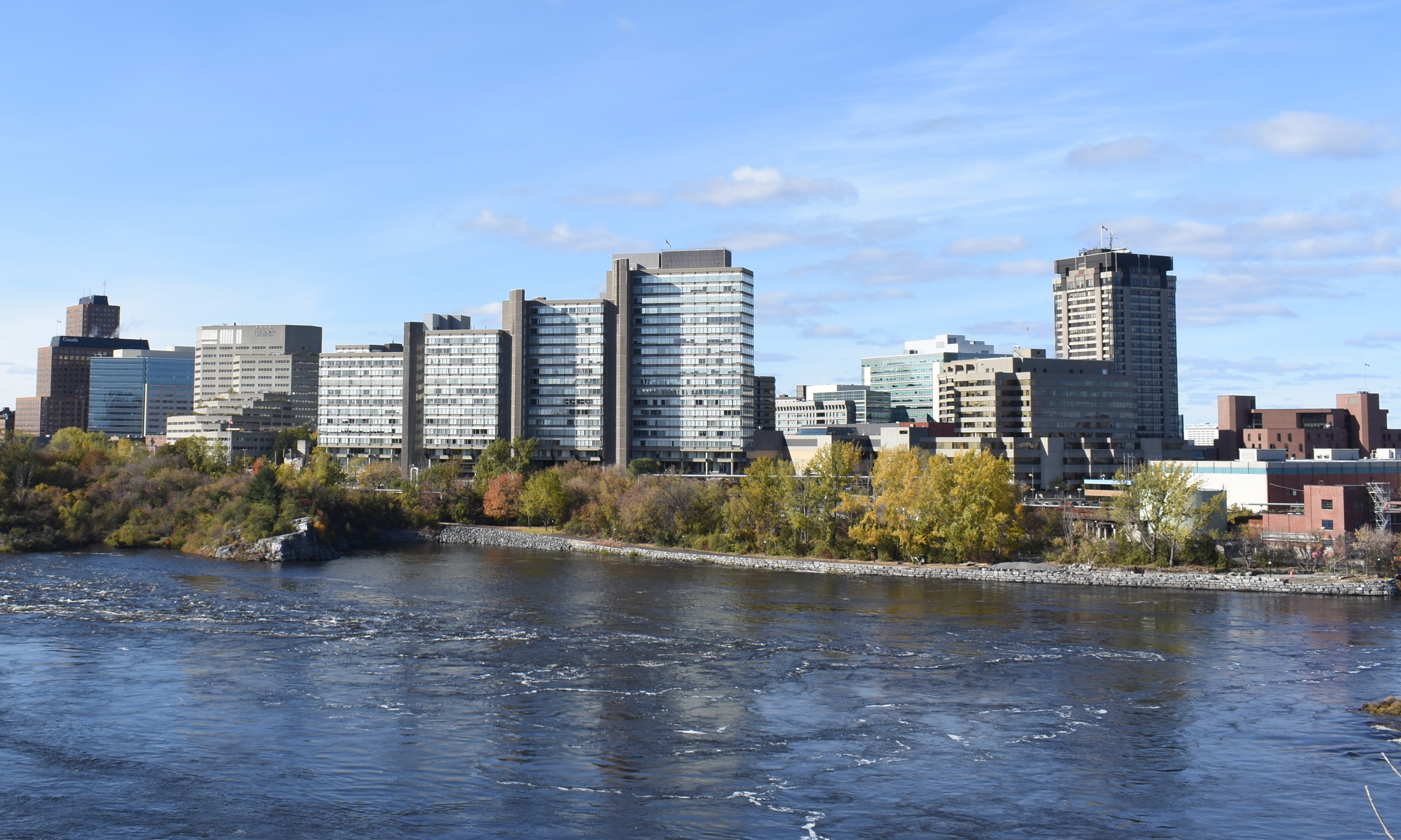
The business district of Hull in Gatineau, Quebec

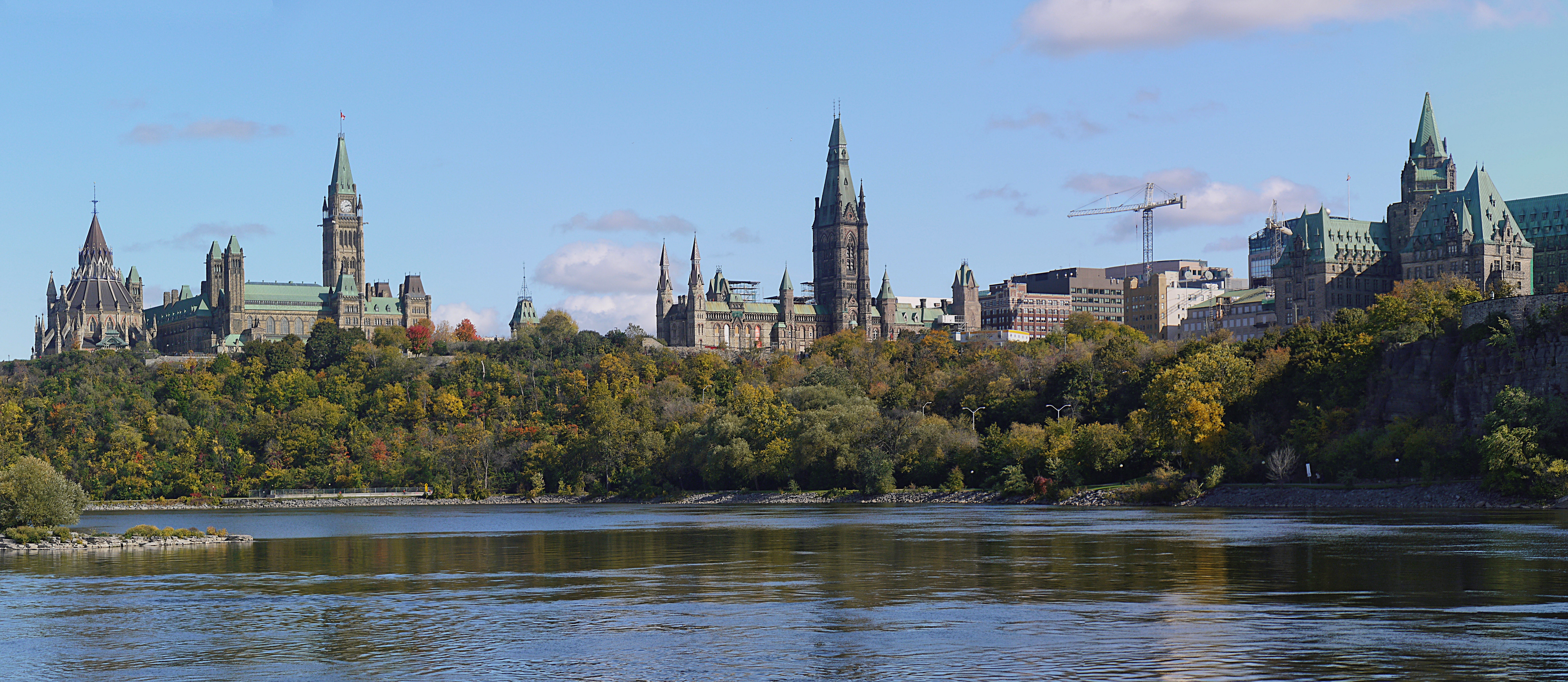
When viewed from the north across the Ottawa River, the downtown buildings are hidden behind the Canadian Parliament Buildings on Parliament Hill

Ottawa is the capital city of Canada, and forms the core of the National Capital Region (NCR), which includes the city of Gatineau, bordering Ottawa to the north. Together, the Ottawa–Gatineau metropolitan area has a population of over 1.48 million, the fourth-largest in Canada. As of 2026, there are 90 buildings that stand taller than 75 metres (246 ft). Despite this, Ottawa has few skyscrapers that exceed 100 m (328 ft) compared to similarly populated Calgary and Edmonton, having only eight. It is the largest city in Canada without a skyscraper taller than 150 m (492 ft). The NCR has a system of protected view planes that are governed by the National Capital Commission. This has limited the height of buildings the downtown cores of Ottawa and Gatineau to protect the prominence of the Canadian Parliament Buildings. Instead, the tallest building in Ottawa is Claridge Icon, a 143 m (469 ft), 45-storey residential tower completed in 2022 in Little Italy.

Selected as Canada's capital in 1857, construction on the Parliament Buildings soon began in 1859 and was completed by 1876, housing the Parliament of Canada. After the Centre Block caught fire in 1916, the edifice was rebuilt with the incorporation of the Peace Tower, a bell and clock tower reaching 92 metres (302 ft) in height. Until 1965, buildings in Ottawa were limited to 45.5 m (149 ft) so that the Peace Tower could dominate the skyline. Hence, the Peace Tower stood as the tallest building in Ottawa for about half a century from 1927. The removal of the height limit led to a boom in commercial high-rises that lasted until the mid-1970s, with the tallest of the Place de Ville complex surpassing the Centre Block in height in 1971. High-rise development continued until the early 1990s, after which no buildings taller than 75 m (246 ft) were erected in Ottawa until 2004.

Since then, most new high-rises have been for residential use. An increasing number of high-rises have been added in neighbourhoods outside of downtown, such as the 108 m (354 ft) Minto Metropole in 2004, the tallest building in Westboro, and the Claridge Plaza complex in Sandy Hill, adding to a growing cluster around ByWard Market. Since the early 2020s, there has been a rapid surge in residential towers across Ottawa–Gatineau, spurred on by healthy population growth and policy encouraging transit-oriented development. 29 buildings taller than 75 m (246 ft) have been completed in a four-year span between 2022 and 2025, including Claridge Icon in Little Italy, Luxo Place in Cyrville, Ascent at LeBreton Flats, and The Dale I in Mechanicsville, each being the tallest building in their respective neighbourhoods.

Unlike many urban areas in Northern America, Ottawa–Gatineau's tallest buildings are spread across various neighbourhoods. The largest group of tall buildings is in Downtown Ottawa, forming a cluster that extends to Centretown. Parliament Hill separates the cluster from the Ottawa River to the north. Across the river in Gatineau is the central business district of Hull. While not as built-up as Downtown Ottawa, Hull contains the Terrasses de la Chaudière complex of government office buildings; its main tower was the tallest building in Ottawa–Gatineau from 1978 to 2022. Federal government buildings are also found in Tunney's Pasture. Otherwise, the largest clusters of residential high-rises are found around Little Italy, in Westboro, or near ByWard Market.

== History ==
Number of buildings by height in Ottawa–Gatineau by the end of each year, based on the list below. Click on the legend to toggle a specific height on or off. View chart definition.

== Map of tallest buildings ==
=== Downtown and surrounding neighbourhoods ===
Downtown and Centretown contain the largest cluster of tall buildings in Ottawa–Gatineau, while other groups of tall buildings can be found nearby. The cluster in the ByWard Market and on Rideau Street across the Rideau Canal is northeast of Downtown, and the cluster of Hull, across the Ottawa River in the city of Gatineau, is northwest of Downtown. A system of protected view planes preserve views of the Peace Tower, the oldest building on the map, imposing building height restrictions near the centre of the city. This map shows the location of buildings taller than 75 m (246 ft) in Downtown Ottawa and its surrounding neighbourhoods. Each marker is numbered by the building's height rank, and coloured by the decade of its completion.

Buildings taller than 75 m (246 ft) in central Ottawa.
- 1950s and before
- 1960s
- 1970s
- 1980s
- 1990s
- 2000s
- 2010s
- 2020s
2 Terrasses de la Chaudière I
4 Place de Ville III
7 Ascent @ LeBreton Flats
8 Place du Portage I
11 151 O'Connor Street
12 Ottawa Marriott Hotel
15 Relevé I
16 One60 Elgin
18 Peace Tower
19 Minto One80five
21 Performance Court
23 The Met
24 66 Slater
26 Place de Ville I
27 Place de Ville II
28 L'Esplanade Laurier East
29 L'Esplanade Laurier West
31 Claridge Plaza IV
32 Claridge Plaza III
33 World Exchange Plaza Tower I
34 Muze on Rideau I
35 Claridge Moon II
36 Tribeca East
37 Tribeca West
39 Claridge Moon I
42 Department of National Defence Building
43 Terrasses de la Chaudière II
44 Envie at 256 Rideau I
45 Envie at 256 Rideau II
46 The Carlisle
47 Claridge Royale
50 Loop by Claridge I
51 Loop by Claridge II
52 Constitution Square II
54 Queen Elizabeth Towers East
55 Queen Elizabeth Towers West
57 Minto Place Canada Building
58 Place du Portage IIIA
59 Claridge Plaza II
61 Lithwick Building
66 The Emmy
67 269 Laurier West
68 Delta Ottawa City Centre
71 EDC Headquarters
72 Claridge Plaza I
74 Voda Apartments
75 Relevé II
77 Jean Edmonds Towers South
79 AC Marriott Ottawa Downtown & MRKT Lofts
80 Constitution Square III
84 180 Kent at Minto Place
86 Standard Life Centre North
88 Place St-George
89 Albion Executive Tower/Novotel Ottawa
90 The Westin Ottawa

=== Other neighbourhoods ===
A significant share of high-rises in Ottawa are located further from downtown Ottawa, including its tallest building, Claridge Icon, which is in Little Italy.

Little Italy and vicinity
Buildings taller than 75 m (246 ft).
- 1970s
- 2010s
- 2020s
1 Claridge Icon
13 SoHo Italia
22 Envie Suites I
48 Sir William Logan Building
53 SoHo Champagne 2
63 Envie Suites II

Mechanicsville and Tunney's Pasture
Buildings taller than 75 m (246 ft).
- 1960s
- 1970s
- 2020s
6 The Dale I
9 R.H. Coats Building
14 Parkdale Collective
20 The Dale II
76 Jeanne Mance Building

Westboro
Buildings taller than 75 m (246 ft).
- 1970s
- 2000s
- 2020s
5 Minto Metropole
30 Livmore Westboro Village
40 Azure Westboro
56 Westboro Connection
81 Island Park Towers III

== Cityscape ==
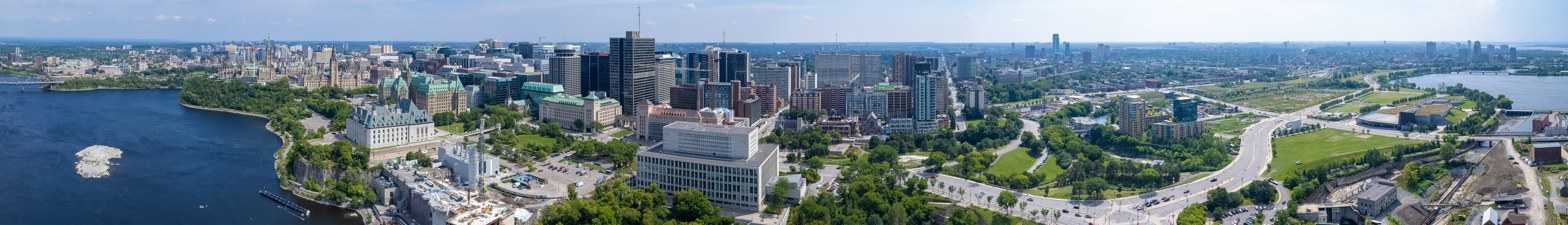
Panorama of Ottawa in 2022, with Parliament Hill (left), Downtown Ottawa (centre), Little Italy in the background (right), and Tunney's Pasture, Mechanicsville, and Westboro (far right)

== Tallest buildings ==
This list ranks completed buildings in Ottawa–Gatineau that stand at least 75 m (246 ft) tall as of 2026, based on standard height measurement to architectural tip. This includes spires and architectural details but does not include antenna masts. Only occupied floors are counted, excluding mechanical only floors. The “Year” column indicates the year of completion. Buildings tied in height are sorted by year of completion with earlier buildings ranked first, and then alphabetically. Most of the buildings are in the city of Ottawa, while the few in Gatineau are all in the neighbourhood of Hull.

Was the tallest building in Ottawa–Gatineau upon completion
Architecturally topped out but not yet completed

Rank	Name	Image	Location	Height m (ft)	Floors	Year	Purpose	Notes
1	Claridge Icon		Little Italy 45°23′53″N 75°42′27″W	143 (469)	46	2022	Residential	Tallest building in Ottawa and in Ontario outside of the Golden Horseshoe. Topped out in 2019. Tallest building completed in Ottawa in the 2020s.
2	Odenak West Tower		LeBreton Flats 45°24′50″N 75°42′38″W	123.7 (406)	36	2027	Residential	Tallest building in LeBreton Flats.
3	Terrasses de la Chaudière I		Hull 45°25′32″N 75°43′19″W	117 (384)	30	1978	Office	Tallest building in Ottawa—Gatineau from 1978 to 2022; remains the tallest building in Gatineau. In 2023, a project began to reclad the precast brick clad building with glass curtain walls, as well as near total replacement of building interior and systems.
4	Luxo Place		Cyrville 45°25′30″N 75°37′54″W	115 (377)	35	2025	Residential	Tallest building in Cyrville.
5	Place de Ville III		Downtown 45°25′09″N 75°42′17″W	112 (367)	29	1971	Office	Tallest building in Ottawa from 1971 to 2022. Tallest building in Ottawa—Gatineau from 1971 to 1978. Tallest building in Downtown Ottawa. Tallest building completed in Ottawa in the 1970s. Part of the Place de Ville complex.
6	Odenak East Tower	–	LeBreton Flats 45°24′50″N 75°42′38″W	107.3 (352)	31	2027	Residential	
7	Minto Metropole		Westboro 45°23′51″N 75°45′02″W	108 (354)	33	2004	Residential	Tallest building completed in Ottawa in the 2000s. Tallest building in Westboro.
8	The Dale I		Mechanicsville 45°24′31″N 75°44′00″W	105.1 (345)	33	2022	Residential	Tallest building in Mechanicsville.
9	Ascent @ LeBreton Flats		LeBreton Flats 45°24′55″N 75°42′45″W	102.1 (335)	30	2025	Residential	Tallest building in LeBreton Flats until 2026. Also known as Claridge East Flats I.
10	Place du Portage I		Hull 45°25′42″N 75°42′46″W	102 (335)	24	1973	Office	Second tallest building in Gatineau.
11	R.H. Coats Building		Tunney's Pasture 45°24′17″N 75°44′03″W	99 (325)	26	1976	Office	Tallest building in Tunney's Pasture.
12	Claridge Hintonburg		Hintonburg 45°24′24″N 75°43′08″W	98.6 (323)	30	2026	Residential	Tallest building in Hintonburg.
13	151 O'Connor Street		Downtown 45°25′09″N 75°41′47″W	97.3 (319)	26	1983	Office	Tallest building completed in Ottawa in the 1980s. Also known as Place Export Canada or 234 Laurier West.
14	Ottawa Marriott Hotel		Downtown 45°25′11″N 75°42′12″W	96.3 (316)	26	1972	Hotel	Briefly became the tallest building in Ottawa-Gatineau during its construction in 1971.
15	SoHo Italia		Little Italy 45°23′53″N 75°42′30″W	96 (315)	30	2023	Residential	
16	Parkdale Collective		Mechanicsville 45°24′25″N 75°43′57″W	96 (315)	31	2025	Residential	
17	Relevé I		Downtown 45°25′03″N 75°42′16″W	95.5 (313)	29	2025	Residential	
18	One60 Elgin		Centretown 45°25′12″N 75°41′35″W	94 (308)	27	1971	Office	Formerly known as Place Bell. Tallest building in Centretown.
19	The Classics		Riverview 45°24′41″N 75°39′40″W	93 (305)	29	1990	Residential	Tallest building in Riverview. Tallest building completed in Ottawa in the 1990s.
20	Peace Tower		Downtown 45°25′29″N 75°41′59″W	92.2 (302)	11	1927	Government	Tallest building in Ottawa-Gatineau from 1927 to 1971. Part of the Centre Block, which is home to both houses of the Parliament of Canada.
21	Minto One80five		Downtown 45°25′02″N 75°42′12″W	91.8 (301)	30	1989	Mixed-use	Mixed-use residential and hotel building.
22	The Dale II		Mechanicsville 45°24′32″N 75°44′01″W	91.7 (301)	29	2024	Residential	
23	Performance Court		Downtown 45°25′13″N 75°41′37″W	89.6 (294)	21	2014	Office	
24	Envie Suites I		Civic Hospital 45°23′56″N 75°42′40″W	89.5 (294)	28	2016	Residential	
25	The Met		Centretown 45°25′07″N 75°41′40″W	89.4 (293)	27	2023	Residential	
26	66 Slater	–	Downtown 45°25′17″N 75°41′39″W	88 (289)	22	1971	Office	
27	Le Parc		Manor Park 45°26′34″N 75°38′49″W	87.8 (288)	29	1988	Residential	Tallest building in Manor Park.
28	Place de Ville I	–	Downtown 45°25′09″N 75°42′12″W	87 (285)	22	1966	Office	Part of the Place de Ville complex.
29	Place de Ville II	–	Downtown 45°25′09″N 75°42′10″W	87 (285)	22	1966	Office	Part of the Place de Ville complex.
30	L'Esplanade Laurier East	–	Downtown 45°25′08″N 75°41′49″W	87 (285) (Note: Sources do not state the exact height of this building. This figure was determined using Google Earth by subtracting the altitude of the building's lowest main pedestrian open-air entrance from its highest architectural point.)	21	1975	Office	
31	L'Esplanade Laurier West	–	Downtown 45°25′07″N 75°41′53″W	87 (285)	21	1975	Office	
32	Livmore Westboro Village	–	Westboro 45°23′47″N 75°45′04″W	85.4 (280)	26	2024	Residential	
33	Claridge Plaza IV	–	Sandy Hill 45°25′40″N 75°41′13″W	85 (279)	28	2014	Residential	
34	Claridge Plaza III	–	Sandy Hill 45°25′41″N 75°41′14″W	85 (279)	28	2015	Residential	
35	World Exchange Plaza Tower I		Downtown 45°25′17″N 75°41′53″W	84.8 (278)	20	1991	Office	
36	Muze on Rideau I	–	ByWard Market 45°25′44″N 75°41′11″W	84.7 (278)	28	2024	Residential	
37	Claridge Moon II	–	Downtown 45°25′06″N 75°42′19″W	84.6 (278)	27	2023	Residential	
38	Tribeca East		Centretown 45°25′09″N 75°41′35″W	84.5 (277)	27	2015	Residential	
39	Tribeca West		Centretown 45°25′08″N 75°41′37″W	84.5 (277)	27	2015	Residential	
40	Rhythm	–	Carlington 45°23′13″N 75°44′01″W	84.3 (277)	24	2022	Residential	
41	Claridge Moon I	–	Downtown 45°25′05″N 75°42′19″W	84.3 (277)	27	2023	Residential	
42	Azure Westboro	–	Westboro 45°23′41″N 75°45′17″W	84.3 (277)	25	2025	Residential	
43	Story of Rideau & Chapel	–	Lower Town 45°25′54″N 75°40′51″W	84.2 (276)	25	2022	Residential	
44	Department of National Defence Building		Sandy Hill 45°25′25″N 75°41′22″W	84 (276)	18	1974	Government	Also known as the Major-General George R. Pearkes Building.
45	Terrasses de la Chaudière II		Hull 45°25′32″N 75°43′13″W	84 (276)	19	1977	Office	
46	Envie at 256 Rideau I	–	Sandy Hill 45°25′41″N 75°41′12″W	84 (275)	29	2022	Residential	Also known as ALMA @ ByWard Market.
47	Envie at 256 Rideau II	–	Sandy Hill 45°25′40″N 75°41′11″W	84 (275)	29	2022	Residential	Also known as ALMA @ ByWard Market.
48	The Carlisle		Downtown 45°25′00″N 75°42′10″W	83.5 (274)	28	1986	Mixed-use	Mixed-use residential and office building.
49	Claridge Royale	–	ByWard Market 45°25′43″N 75°41′15″W	83 (272)	27	2024	Residential	
50	Sir William Logan Building	–	Little Italy 45°24′00″N 75°42′21″W	82.6 (271)	21	1974	Office	Headquarters of Natural Resources Canada.
51	Minto Upper West	–	Westboro 45°23′22″N 75°45′39″W	82.6 (271)	24	2017	Residential	
52	Loop by Claridge I	–	Centretown 45°25′08″N 75°41′42″W	82.5 (271)	27	2022	Residential	
53	Loop by Claridge II	–	Centretown 45°25′09″N 75°41′42″W	82.5 (271)	27	2022	Residential	
54	Constitution Square II		Downtown 45°25′06″N 75°42′11″W	82.3 (270) (Note: The CTBUH’s figure for this height is likely an overestimate. This figure was determined using Google Earth.)	21	1992	Office	
55	SoHo Champagne 2	–	Civic Hospital 45°23′54″N 75°42′39″W	82 (270)	25	2024	Residential	
56	Queen Elizabeth Towers East	–	Downtown 45°24′57″N 75°42′19″W	82 (269)	28	1975	Residential	
57	Queen Elizabeth Towers West	–	Downtown 45°24′55″N 75°42′20″W	82 (269)	28	1975	Residential	
58	Westboro Connection	–	Westboro 45°23′48″N 75°45′00″W	81.7 (268)	25	2020	Residential	
59	Minto Place Canada Building	–	Downtown 45°25′04″N 75°42′09″W	80.5 (264)	18	1989	Office	
60	Place du Portage IIIA		Hull 45°25′33″N 75°42′45″W	80.2 (263)	19	1979	Office	
61	Claridge Plaza II	–	Sandy Hill 45°25′39″N 75°41′15″W	80.2 (263)	26	2011	Residential	
62	Le Viu II	–	Hull 45°26′09″N 75°42′33″W	80.2 (263)	24	2022	Residential	
63	Lithwick Building	–	Downtown 45°25′12″N 75°41′42″W	79.9 (262)	22	1989	Office	
64	Park Place Apartments	–	Woodroffe 45°22′32″N 75°46′40″W	79.5 (261)	28	1978	Residential	
65	Envie Suites II		Civic Hospital 45°23′56″N 75°42′41″W	79.5 (261)	25	2020	Residential	
66	Chateau Royale East	–	Rideau View 45°22′10″N 75°42′16″W	79.3 (260)	28	1975	Residential	
67	Chateau Royale West	–	Rideau View 45°22′11″N 75°42′11″W	79.3 (260)	28	1975	Residential	
68	The Emmy	–	Downtown 45°25′17″N 75°41′43″W	79.1 (260)	25	2024	Residential	
69	269 Laurier West	–	Downtown 45°25′09″N 75°41′55″W	78.7 (258)	18	2005	Residential	
70	Delta Ottawa City Centre		Downtown 45°25′07″N 75°42′15″W	78.4 (257)	26	1967	Hotel	
71	Place Vincent Massey I	–	Hull 45°26′34″N 75°43′59″W	78.4 (257)	21	1972	Office	
72	Riviera South	–	Riverview 45°24′39″N 75°39′47″W	78.4 (257)	27	1988	Residential	
73	EDC Headquarters	–	Downtown 45°25′12″N 75°41′50″W	78.2 (257)	19	2011	Office	
74	Claridge Plaza I	–	Sandy Hill 45°25′38″N 75°41′18″W	78 (256)	25	2008	Residential	
75	Maison Riverain	–	Vanier 45°25′58″N 75°40′08″W	78 (256)	22	2025	Residential	Tallest building in Vanier.
76	Voda Apartments	–	Chaudière Island 45°25′12″N 75°43′06″W	78 (256)	25	2024	Residential	Tallest building on Chaudière Island.
77	Relevé II		Downtown 45°25′04″N 75°42′18″W	77.5 (254)	23	2025	Residential	
78	Jeanne Mance Building	–	Tunney's Pasture 45°24′23″N 75°44′21″W	77.1 (253)	21	1969	Office	
79	Jean Edmonds Towers South	–	Downtown 45°25′05″N 75°42′03″W	77 (253)	20	1973	Office	
80	Dunton Tower		Carleton University 45°22′58″N 75°41′57″W	77 (253)	23	1974	Education	Part of Carleton University.
81	AC Marriott Ottawa Downtown & MRKT Lofts	–	ByWard Market 45°25′40″N 75°41′18″W	77 (253)	24	2025	Mixed-use	Mixed-use hotel and residential building.
82	Constitution Square III		Downtown 45°25′07″N 75°42′09″W	76.8 (252)	19	2007	Office	
83	Island Park Towers III		Westboro 45°23′58″N 75°45′05″W	76.5 (251)	26	1970	Residential	
84	Frobisher Place		Riverview 45°24′05″N 75°39′56″W	76.5 (251)	26	1975	Residential	
85	Castleview		Riverview 45°24′07″N 75°39′55″W	76.2 (250)	26	1975	Residential	
86	180 Kent at Minto Place	–	Downtown 45°25′04″N 75°42′07″W	76.2 (250)	19	2009	Office	
87	Frontier	–	Carson Grove 45°25′50″N 75°36′40″W	76.2 (250)	23	2019	Residential	Tallest building in Carson Grove.
88	Standard Life Centre North	–	Downtown 45°25′07″N 75°42′02″W	75.6 (248)	18	1992	Office	
89	The Cross Winds	–	Carson Meadows 45°26′48″N 75°37′27″W	75.3 (247)	26	1975	Residential	
90	Place St-George	–	ByWard Market 45°25′42″N 75°41′19″W	75.3 (247)	24	1988	Residential	
91	Albion Executive Tower/Novotel Ottawa	–	Sandy Hill 45°25′34″N 75°41′22″W	75.3 (247)	21	1989	Mixed-use	Mixed-use hotel and office building.
92	The Westin Ottawa		Sandy Hill 45°25′30″N 75°41′32″W	75 (246)	22	1982	Hotel	

== Tallest under construction or proposed ==
=== Under construction ===
The following table includes buildings under construction in Ottawa that are planned to be at least 75 m (246 ft) tall as of 2026, based on standard height measurement. The “Year” column indicates the expected year of completion. Buildings that are on hold are not included.

Name	Location	Height m (ft)	Floors	Year	Purpose	Notes
1047 Richmond Rd. — Tower A	Woodroffe	121 (397)	38	–	Residential	
Renaissance Marriott Ottawa	Downtown	118 (387)	36	2027	Residential	
320 Lees Tower 1	Sandy Hill	102 (335)	32	2028	Residential	
1071 Ambleside Dr. - Tower B	Ambleside	97 (318)	32	–	Residential	
Riverain District — Tower C	Vanier	94 (308)	28	–	Residential	
Le WE 3	Hull	–	29	2026	Residential	Topped-out.
1649 Montreal Road	Gloucester	84 (276)	25	–	Residential	

== Timeline of tallest buildings ==
Four buildings held the title of tallest building in Ottawa–Gatineau.

Name	Image	Years as tallest	Height m (ft)	Floors	Notes
Peace Tower		1927–1971	92 (302)	11	
Place de Ville III		1971–1978	112 (367)	29	
Terrasses de la Chaudière I		1978–2022	117 (384)	30	
Claridge Icon		2022–present	143 (469)	45	

== Skylines ==
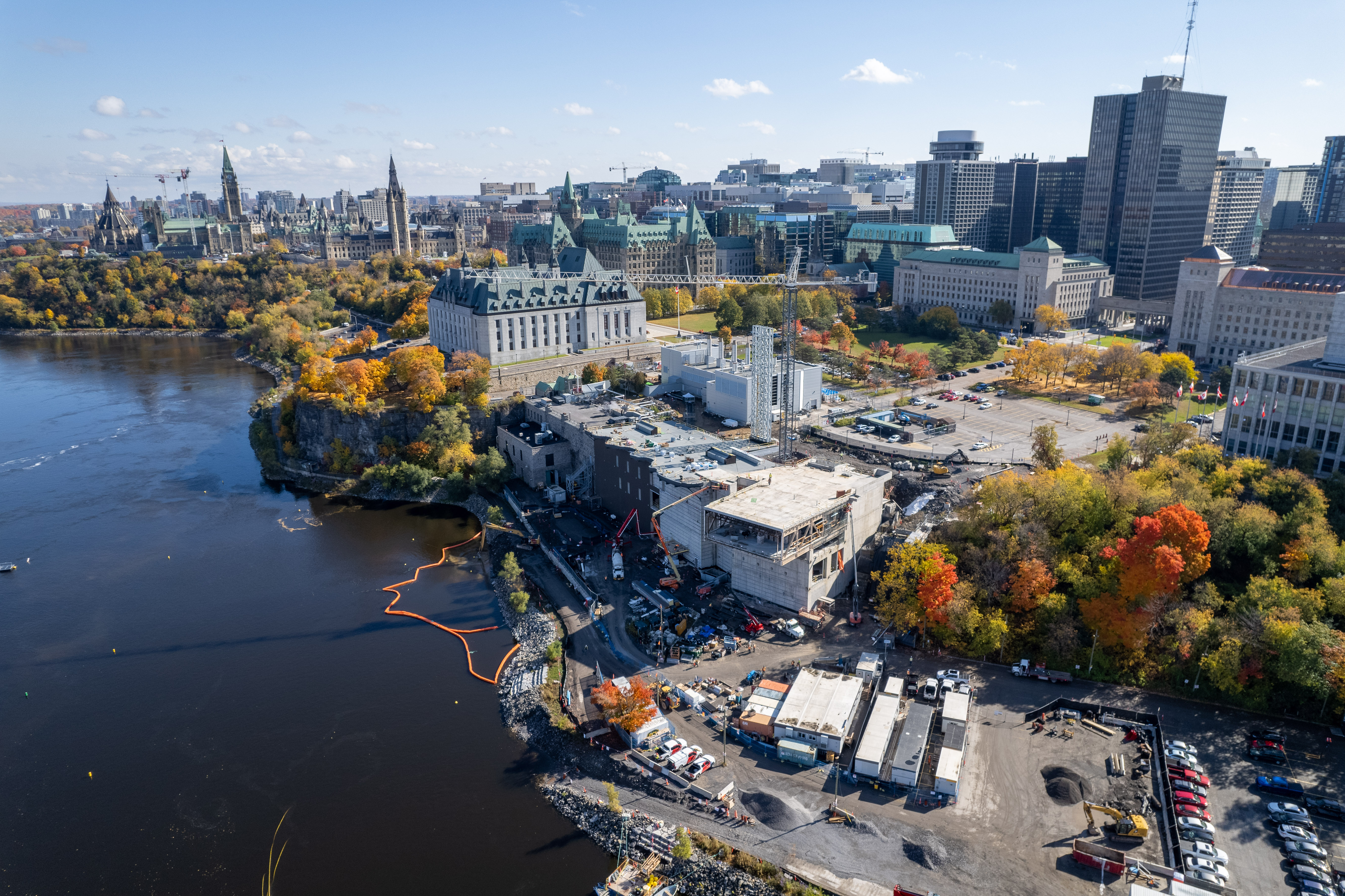
Downtown Ottawa in 2022

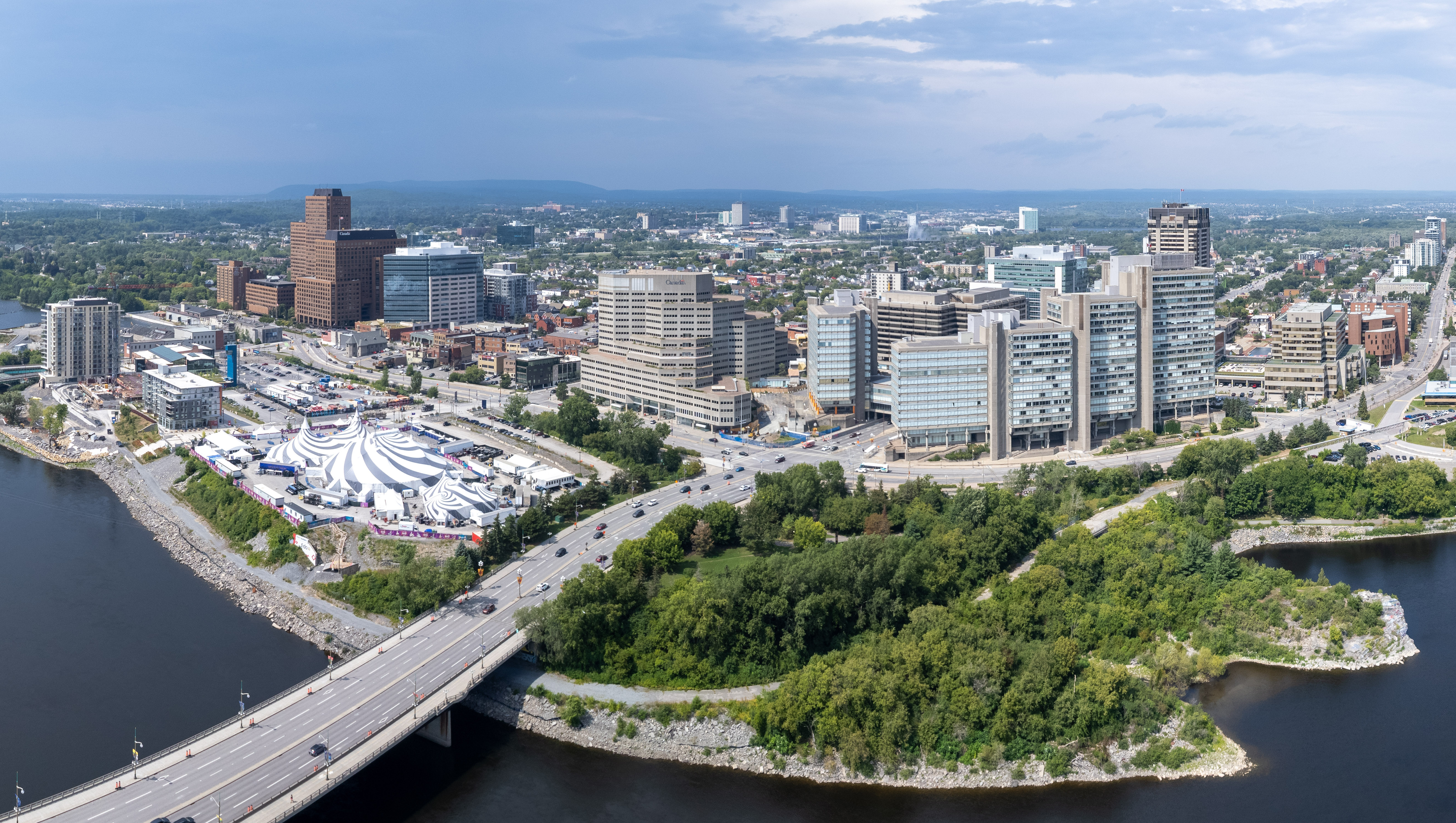
Hull in Gatineau in 2022

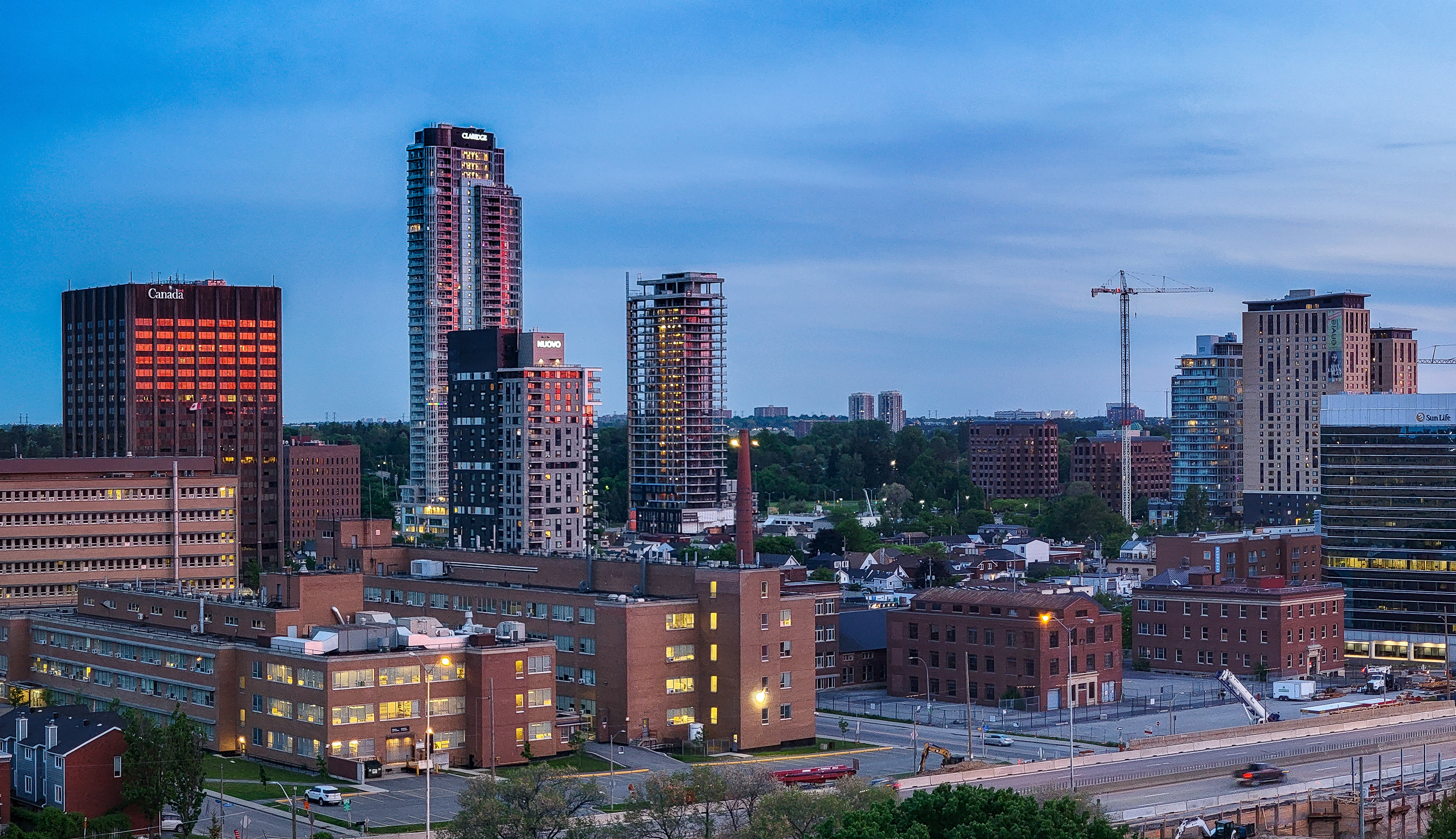
Little Italy's skyline in 2022, with Ottawa's tallest building, the Claridge Icon, on the left.

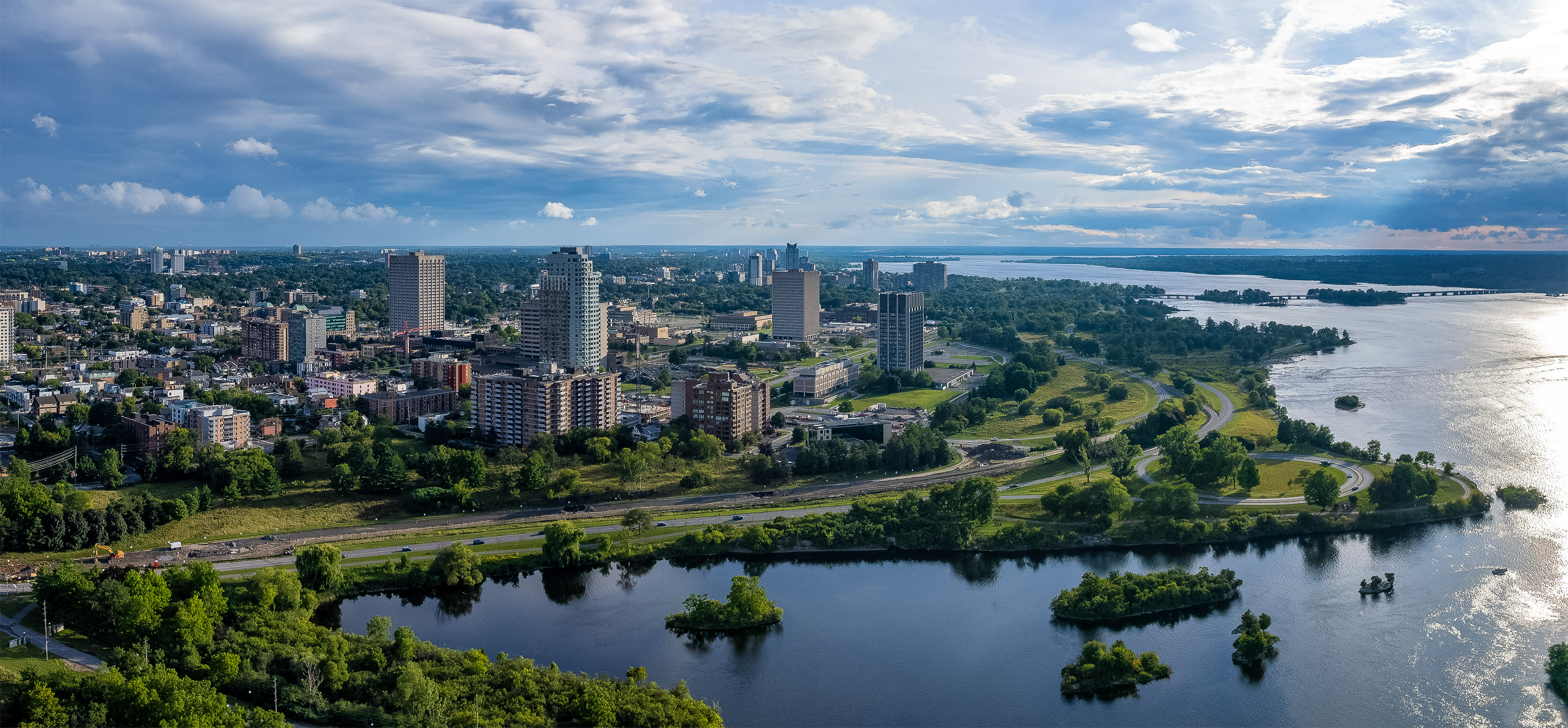
Western Ottawa's rapidly growing skyline in 2022, with Tunney's Pasture in the foreground and Westboro in the background.

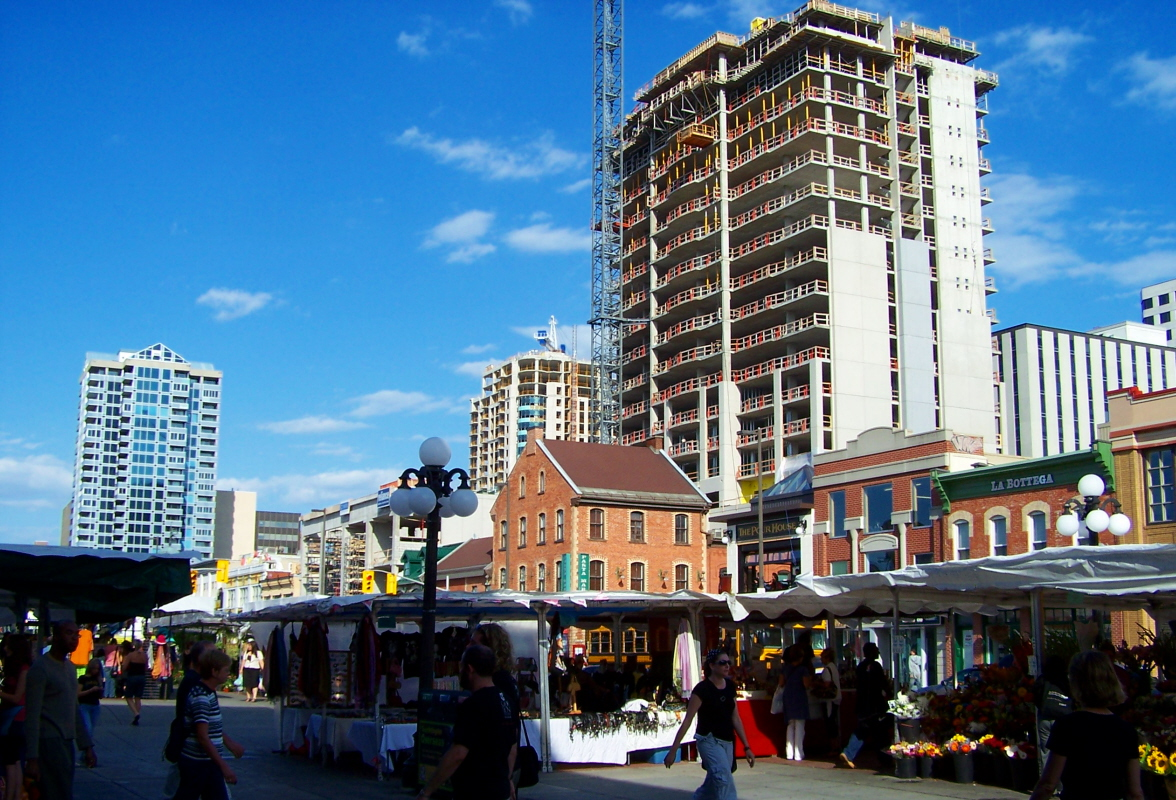
ByWard Market in 2007

== See also ==
- List of buildings in Ottawa
- List of tallest buildings in Canada
- List of tallest buildings in Ontario
- List of tallest buildings in Quebec
- Canadian Centre for Architecture
- Society of Architectural Historians
- Canadian architecture
