= One60 Elgin =

Building in Ottawa, Ontario

Coordinates: 45.419820°N 75.692981°W

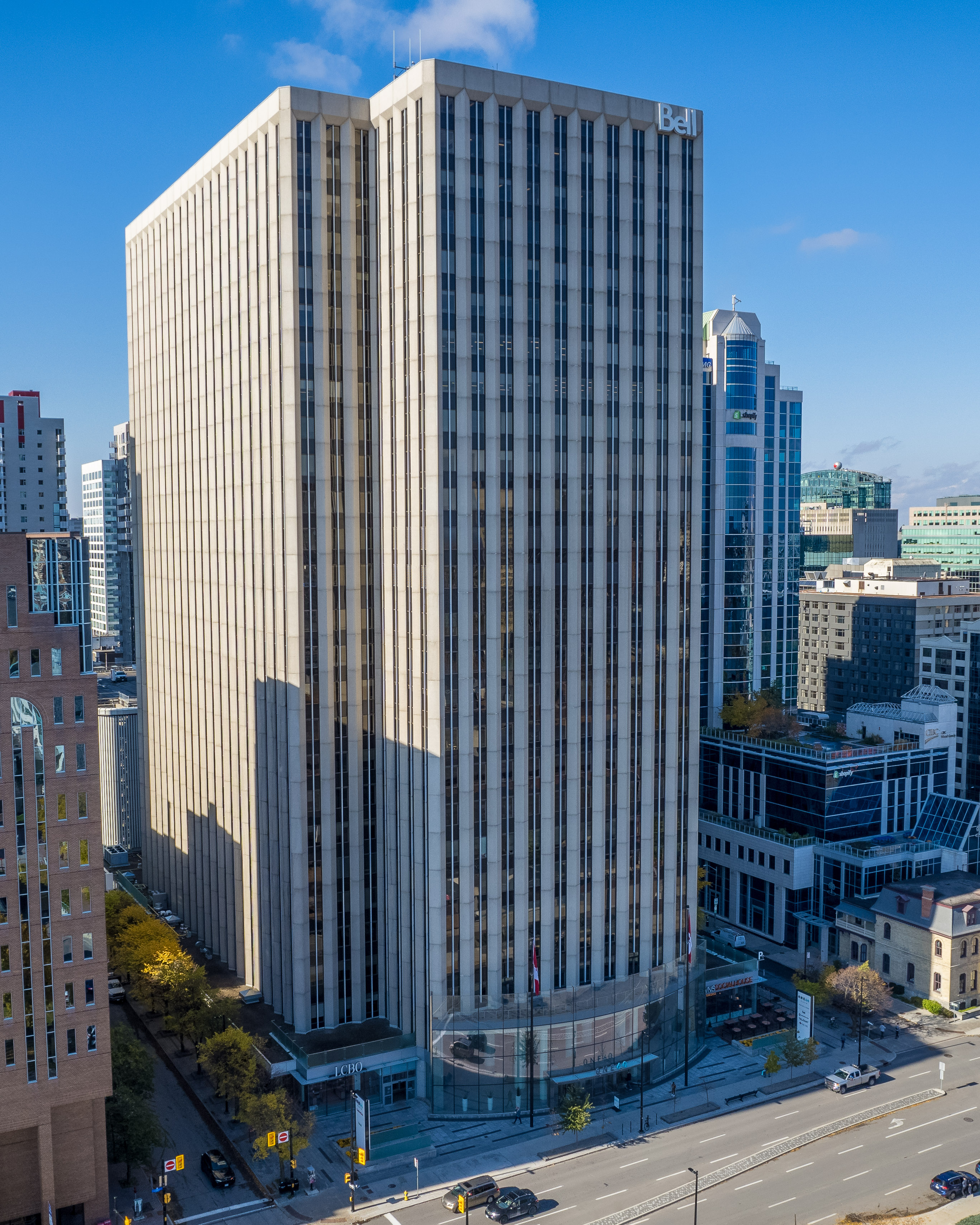

General information
- Location: 160 Elgin Street, Ottawa, Ontario
- Opened: 1971
- Renovated: 2017
- Owner: Groupe Mach

Height
- Height: 94 m (308 ft)

Technical details
- Floor count: 27
- Floor area: 973,611 sq ft (90,451.4 m^{2})
- Lifts/elevators: 16 Public

Design and construction
- Architect: Edward Durell Stone
- Architecture firm: Bregman & Hamann
- Awards and prizes: LEED Gold

Renovating team
- Architect: Petroff Partnership Architects
- Services engineer: Hammerschlag & Joffe

Website
- https://one60elgin.com/

One60 Elgin, formerly Place Bell, is a 27-storey office building in Ottawa, Ontario. It is the 12th tallest building in Ottawa—Gatineau with a height of 94 metres (308 ft). The building stands on Elgin Street in downtown Ottawa, and is distinguishable by its wide stature (the building is unusually large in dimensions considering its height, presumably to avoid having a 50+ storey building greatly overshadow the Peace Tower).

The building was designed in 1969 by Edward Durell Stone for developer Olympia and York, the latter having been contracted by Bell Canada to execute an office on the site. It is the first of two buildings Stone designed in Canada for the developer, the second being First Canadian Place in Toronto.

== History ==
The building was built by Olympia and York in 1971 as the Ottawa headquarters of Bell Canada. The site originally contained a number of small commercial buildings and the large Gloucester Street Convent. Original plans called for the complex to be much larger and include the entire block to the north. This would have entailed demolishing several heritage buildings, including the First Baptist Church.

The main level contains a shopping concourse with a number of businesses. The rear of the structure contains a parking garage. In the 1980s the owners sued the city after salt placed on the roads by the city corroded the steel structure of the garage and it had to be closed for several years.

Bell, which remains the building's largest tenant, owned the building until 1998, when it was sold to TrizecHahn for $17 million. After the purchase, TrizecHahn conducted significant renovations. In 2002 it was bought by H&R Real Estate Investment Trust for $21.1 million.

The building underwent extensive renovations from 2015 to 2017 after which it was renamed One60 Elgin. In 2019, beehives were installed on the building's roof in order to combat declining honey bee populations.

In 2023, it was sold to Groupe Mach for $277 million.

One60 Elgin is briefly featured in the opening title sequence of the Ottawa-made TV series You Can't Do That On Television as a building labelled "Television Network", where a school bus pulls up to the front door and a number of children flood out and into the building, trampling the doorman (played by Les Lye).

== See also ==
- List of tallest buildings in Ottawa-Gatineau
