= Robert Campeau =

Canadian developer (1923–2017)

- Born: 3 August 1923; Chelmsford, Ontario
- Died: 12 June 2017 (aged 93); Ottawa, Ontario
- Occupations: financier and real estate developer
- Known for: development of Kanata and Ottawa; largest retailing bankruptcy in U.S. history
- Spouse(s): Clauda Leroux (m. 1942; div. 1969) Ilse Luebbert (m. 1970; div. 2003) Christel Dettmann

Robert Joseph Antoine Campeau (3 August 1923 – 12 June 2017) was a Canadian financier and real estate developer. Starting from a single house constructed in 1940 in the Alta Vista neighbourhood of Ottawa, Ontario, Campeau built a large land development corporation around the development of the suburb of Kanata. Expansion in the U.S. led Campeau to diversify into the ownership of retail department stores to anchor commercial development projects. The Campeau Corporation used leveraged buyouts to buy the department stores and went bankrupt when it could not maintain the debt payments, in the largest retailing bankruptcy at the time in U.S. history.

== Early years ==
Born in Chelmsford, Ontario, Campeau's formal education ended in Grade 8, at the age of 14. He worked in jobs at Inco as a general labourer, carpenter and machinist. In 1949, he entered the residential end of the construction business. His first project was a single home constructed in partnership with his cousin in Ottawa, Ontario.

== Real estate development ==
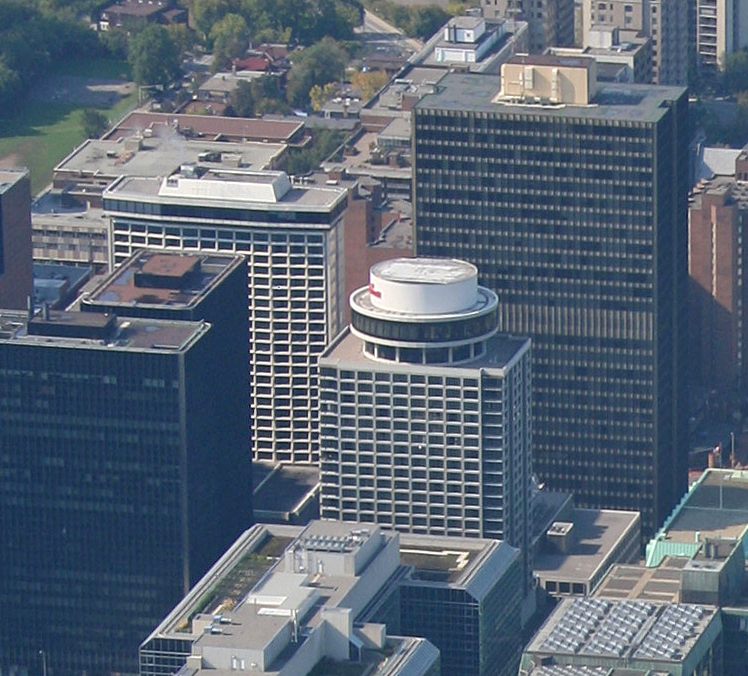
Campeau's Place de Ville complex in Ottawa, completed 1972

In Ottawa, Campeau was able to construct both office complexes and residential subdivisions to accommodate Canada's rapidly expanding civil service. Campeau frequently found himself at odds with Ottawa Mayor Charlotte Whitton over planning decisions. Whitton was quoted as saying, "When I look at his (Campeau's) houses, I think perhaps nuclear bombardment might not be such a terrible thing after all." His Campeau Corporation had two main rivals in the residential housing market: Assaly Construction Limited and Minto Developments Inc., the latter owned by the family of future Ottawa Mayor Lorry Greenberg. Despite opposition from Whitton, Campeau developed a reputation as a high-quality builder and became the most successful in the city. A street is named after him in the Ottawa suburb of Kanata, much of which he developed.

For many years, it was city policy that buildings in the downtown core were not to be taller than the Peace Tower of the parliament buildings. Campeau objected to this rule and was drawn into conflict with city council over large high-rise developments such as Place de Ville.

Due to his relationships with many civil servants and ministers, he was able to have most of his projects approved. Campeau's real estate development success soon spread outside Ottawa. In the early 1970s, Campeau took over the redevelopment of Toronto's waterfront which included the new Toronto Ferry Terminal, Harbour Square Condos, and the Harbour Castle Hotel (now part of the Westin Hotels chain). His later Toronto developments included 1988's Scotia Tower (the city's third tallest skyscraper).

== Corporate takeovers and bankruptcy ==
In the 1980s, Campeau embarked on a series of leveraged buyouts (LBOs). His first attempt at a large takeover was the Royal Trust Company, which was valued at Can$7 billion compared to the $866 million for Campeau Corporation. The bank was later sold and is now part of the Royal Bank of Canada.

As his business expanded, Campeau ventured into the United States, looking for acquisitions that would add shopping mall real estate to his portfolio of assets. Through junk bond LBOs, Campeau Corporation gained control of Allied Stores for US$3.6 billion in 1986 and Federated Department Stores, owner of Bloomingdale's, for $6.6 billion in 1988. Campeau retained well-known investment banker Bruce Wasserstein to assist with the transactions. However, the debt obligations that needed to be covered following the merger were too large, and, exacerbated by a market downturn that hurt retail sales, Campeau Corporation was unable to meet its debt obligations.

By June 1989, following Campeau's takeover of Federated Department Stores, both Federated and Allied Department Stores were losing money despite increased sales in year-over-year comparisons. Federated and Allied eventually filed for bankruptcy reorganization. The company was eventually acquired by the Reichman brothers, who filed for bankruptcy themselves, and Campeau Corporation ceased to exist.

A New York Times editorial stated, "Any corporate executive can figure out how to file for bankruptcy when the bottom drops out of the business. It took the special genius of Robert Campeau, chairman of the Campeau Corporation, to figure out how to bankrupt more than 250 profitable department stores. The dramatic jolt to Bloomingdale's, Abraham & Straus, Jordan Marsh, and the other proud stores reflects his overreaching grasp and oversized ego."

== Personal life ==
Campeau resided in a lakeside castle in Austria and he became involved in some real estate projects including developing a large subdivision in Teltow (former GDR) near Berlin, Germany. That project failed, and Campeau's company went bankrupt in 2001. The funds of the charitable foundation (Robert Campeau Family Foundation) used in his business were lost.

Campeau died on June 12, 2017, in Ottawa.

== Bibliography ==
- Babad, Michael; Mulroney, Catherine. Campeau- The Building of an Empire, 1989, ISBN 0-385-25208-0
- Rothchild, John. Going for broke: How Robert Campeau bankrupted the retail industry, jolted the junk bond market, and brought the booming eighties to a crashing halt, 1991, ISBN 0-14-017316-1
