= Campeau Corporation =

Canadian real estate company (1968–1992)

- Industry: Real estate development
- Founded: 19 January 1968
- Founder: Robert Campeau
- Defunct: 28 January 1992
- Fate: Reorganised by creditors
- Successor: Camdev Corporation (1992–97); O&Y Properties Corporation (1997–2005); Brookfield Properties (PI) Inc. (2005–present)

The Campeau Corporation Limited was a Canadian real estate development and investment company founded by entrepreneur Robert Campeau. It was infamous from its ultimately unsuccessful acquisitions of American department store holding companies Allied Stores in 1986 and Federated Department Stores in 1988. The whole organization soon was mired in bankruptcy and spurred the decline of the regional department store.

In September 1989, Olympia & York provided the company a $250 million loan, and as part of the agreement, Robert Campeau relinquished control of the company. On 28 January 1992, Campeau Corporation was reorganised as Camdev Corporation. In 1997, Camdev was renamed O&Y Properties Corporation. The company was acquired in October 2005 by Brookfield Properties, and it continues today as Brookfield Properties (PI) Inc.

== History ==
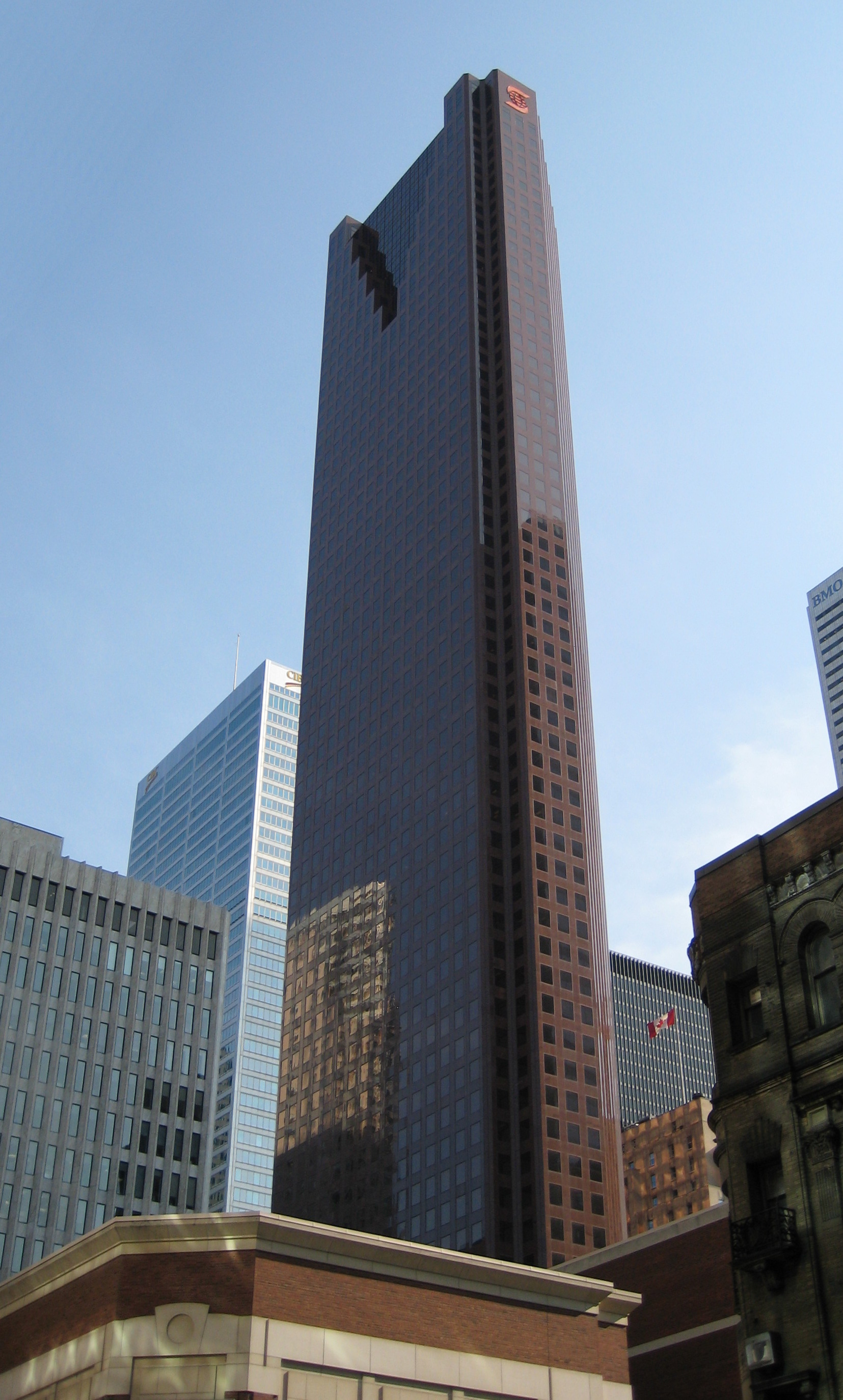
Scotia Plaza in Toronto, one of the major buildings built by Campeau Corporation

Synonymous with its founder, Ottawa-based Campeau was able to construct both office complexes and residential subdivisions to accommodate Canada's rapidly expanding civil service. Campeau Corporation had two main rivals in the residential housing market: Assaly Construction Limited and Minto Developments Inc., the latter owned by the family of future Ottawa mayor Lorry Greenberg.

== Policy ==
For many years, it was city policy in Ottawa that buildings in the downtown core not be taller than the Peace Tower of the Parliament Hill buildings. Campeau found this rule to be unnecessary and was drawn into conflict with city council over large high-rise developments such as Place de Ville. Campeau's real estate development success soon spread outside Ottawa. In Toronto, its notable developments included Scotia Tower (the city's second-tallest skyscraper) and the Harbour Castle Hotel (now part of the Westin Hotels chain) - which helped revitalize the city's waterfront area.

== Acquisitions ==
In the 1980s, Campeau embarked on a series of leveraged buyouts, first bidding unsuccessfully on the Royal Trustco (now owned by Royal Bank of Canada). Its founder's brash, confrontational manner made him an outsider to much of the conservative Canadian business establishment. As his empire expanded, Campeau ventured into the United States, looking for acquisitions that would add shopping mall real estate to his portfolio of assets.

In 1986, Campeau acquired Allied Stores. In 1988, the company followed with the purchase of Federated Department Stores, owner of Bloomingdale's. Campeau retained banker Bruce Wasserstein to assist with the transactions. The purchases were criticized by The New York Times, which noted "recent LBO's benefited the target companies' shareholders who received high takeover prices. But most of the gains seemed to have come at the expense of bondholders, creditors and employees."

In the late 1980s, the debt obligations that needed to be covered following the merger were too large, and exacerbated by a market downturn that hurt retail sales. Campeau Corporation was unable to meet its debt obligations. Federated and Allied eventually filed for bankruptcy reorganization. The company was eventually acquired by Olympia and York who went bankrupt, and Campeau Corporation ceased to exist.

== See also ==
- Carma Developers
