= Place de Ville =

Skyscraper hotels in Canada

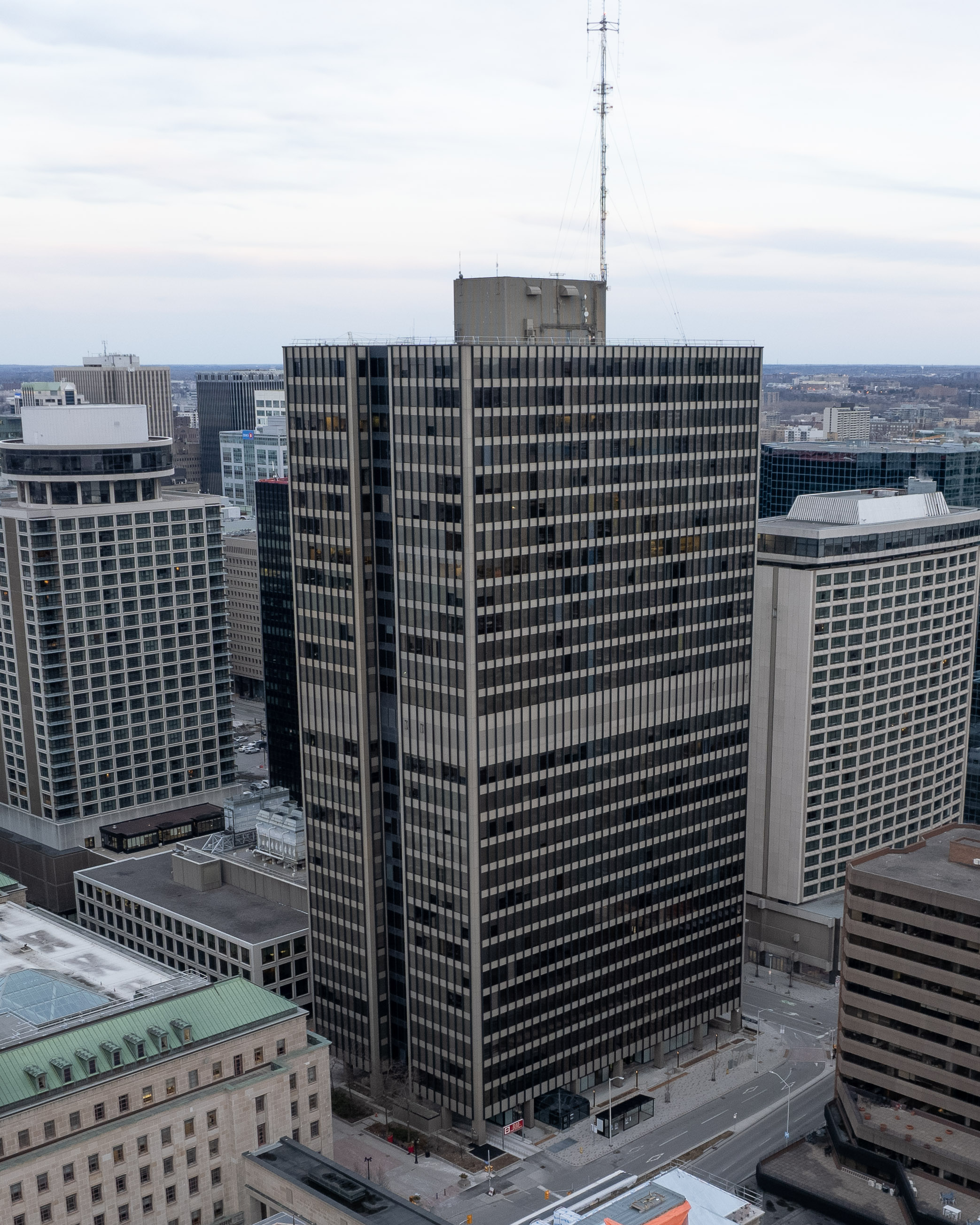
- Tower C of Place de Ville
- Interactive map of the Place de Ville area

General information
- Type: Commercial offices and hotels
- Location: Lyon and Queen Street; Ottawa, Ontario, Canada
- Coordinates: 45°25′08″N 75°42′15″W
- Construction started: 1965
- Completed: 1972
- Owner: Institutional
- Management: Crown Property Management Inc.

Height
- Antenna spire: None
- Roof: Tower A: 87 m (285 ft); Tower B: 87 m (285 ft); Tower C: 112 m (367 ft); Delta Hotel: 91 m (299 ft); Marriott Hotel: 96 m (315 ft)
- Top floor: 29

Technical details
- Floor count: Tower A: 22; Tower B: 22; Tower C: 29; Delta Hotel: 25; Marriott Hotel: 26
- Floor area: 1,200,000 sq ft (110,000 m^{2})
- Lifts/elevators: Tower A: 6 Tower B: 6 Tower C: 12

Design and construction
- Developer: Campeau Corporation
- Main contractor: Campeau Corporation

Other information
- Number of rooms: Delta: 411; Marriott: 486

References
- <https://www.crownrealtypartners.com/properties/ottawa/place-de-ville/>

Place de Ville is a complex of office towers in downtown Ottawa, Ontario, Canada. It consists of four office buildings: Place de Ville A, B, and C; and the 'Podium' building, which houses a shuttered "piggy-back" cinema enveloped with functional office space. The complex also has two large hotels, the Delta Ottawa City Centre (410 rooms) and Ottawa Marriott Hotel (487 rooms). The buildings are linked by an underground shopping complex. Place de Ville C is the tallest office building in Ottawa. It was once advertised as "Ottawa's glittering answer to the Toronto Dominion Centre and Place Ville Marie".

== History and development ==
The complex is located in downtown Ottawa on Albert Street between Kent Street and Lyon. Towers A and B are located on the south side of Queen Street while tower C is on the north of Queen. The buildings are mostly home to various federal government workers, with the Department of Transport, headquartered in Tower C, being the largest tenant.

For almost a century the area had been home to the city's streetcar garages. The streetcar system was closed in 1959. The land was purchased later by developer Robert Campeau. He conceived an ambitious plan to recentre Ottawa's downtown on the site. The scheme faced several barriers, the most important of which was that for many years buildings in downtown Ottawa faced a 45.7 metre (150 foot) height restriction so the Peace Tower would dominate the skyline. Despite strong opposition from Ottawa mayor Charlotte Whitton, the rule was changed to allow the only somewhat taller Towers A and B to be constructed. These two towers were completed in 1968. That same year Campeau began lobbying to build the much taller Tower C. Originally hoping to build a 145-metre (475 foot) tower (which would have made it about 42 storeys), although approved by the city, the National Capital Commission allowed it to only be 112 metres (367 feet) (29 storeys), but it was the tallest building in the city at the time the construction was completed.

In the early 1980s Campeau proposed building a fourth even taller tower but a deep recession and a glut of Ottawa office space ended these plans. The buildings also began to suffer a variety of problems including asbestos, mould, a fire and allegations of Sick Building Syndrome. In the late 1980s Towers A and B were gutted and completely renovated. Campeau's business empire was also struggling and after failed expansion attempts in the United States his company collapsed. In 1996 its remnants, including Place de Ville, were bought by the Reichmann's Olympia and York (O&Y).

In 2000 O&Y announced that work would begin on a third phase of the Place de Ville complex. This would consist of two new towers one 18 storeys and the other 12. They would be built on the large parking lot across from Tower B. Several other downtown building projects and another economic downturn put these plans on hold, however. In February 2005 O&Y announced it would be selling most of its Canadian holdings, including Place de Ville.

== Transportation ==
Since September 14, 2019, the complex is directly linked to Lyon station of O-Train Line 1 which is situated underground between the two phases of Place de Ville. One entrance is integrated into the south façade of the Podium building, while a second entrance can be found within the underground shopping concourse.

The complex boasts the city's largest underground parking garage with space for 974 cars.

== Future developments ==
Place de Ville is now managed by Crown Property Management Inc. Ownership also includes a large surface parking lot taking up half a block across Kent Street from Place de Ville phase I that could see construction of over half a million square feet of development.

== See also ==
- List of tallest buildings in Ottawa–Gatineau
- Line 1 (O-Train)
- Underground City
- Robert Campeau
- Brookfield Properties
