= Preston Street (Ottawa) =

Street in Ottawa, Ontario, Canada

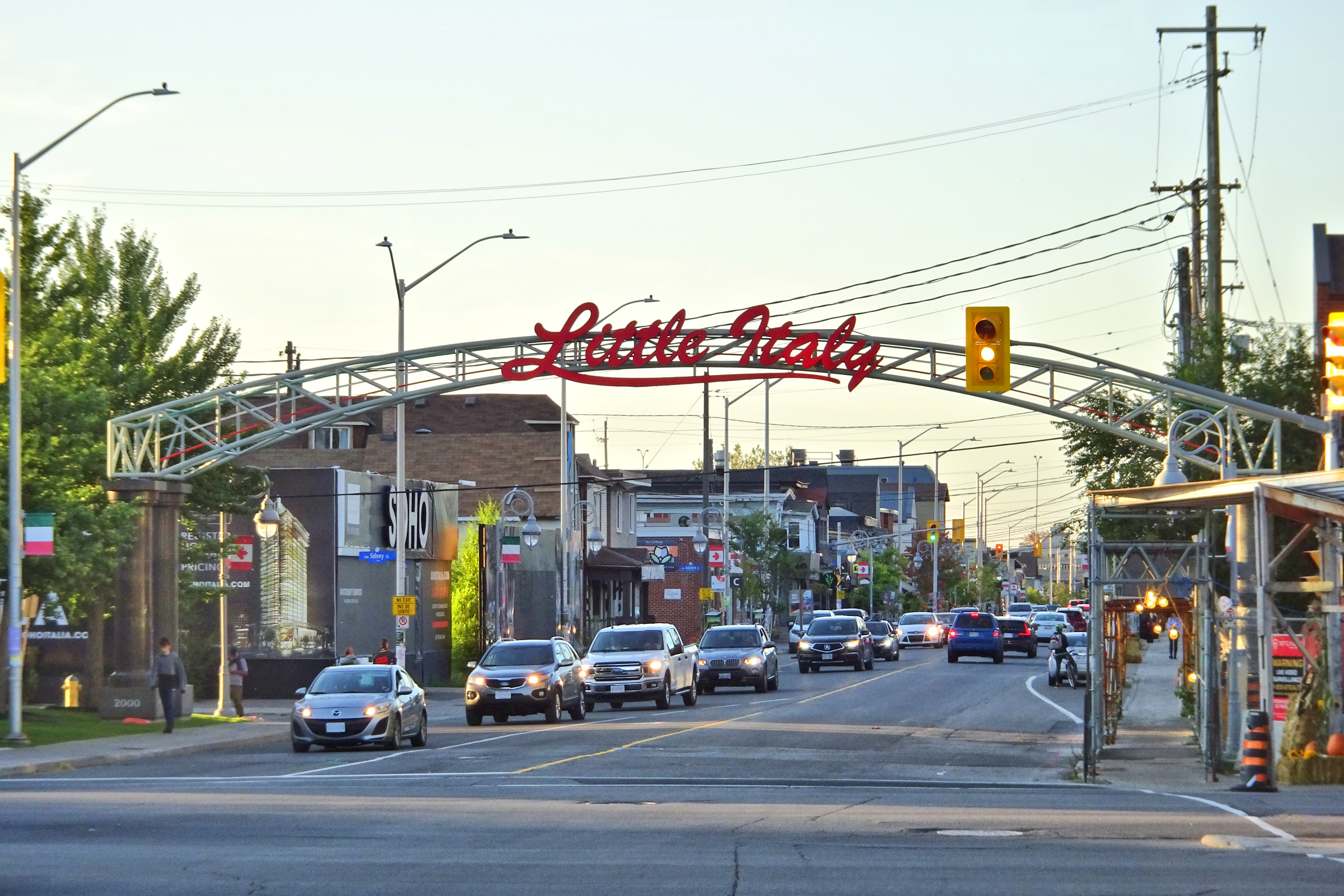
Preston Street at Carling Avenue

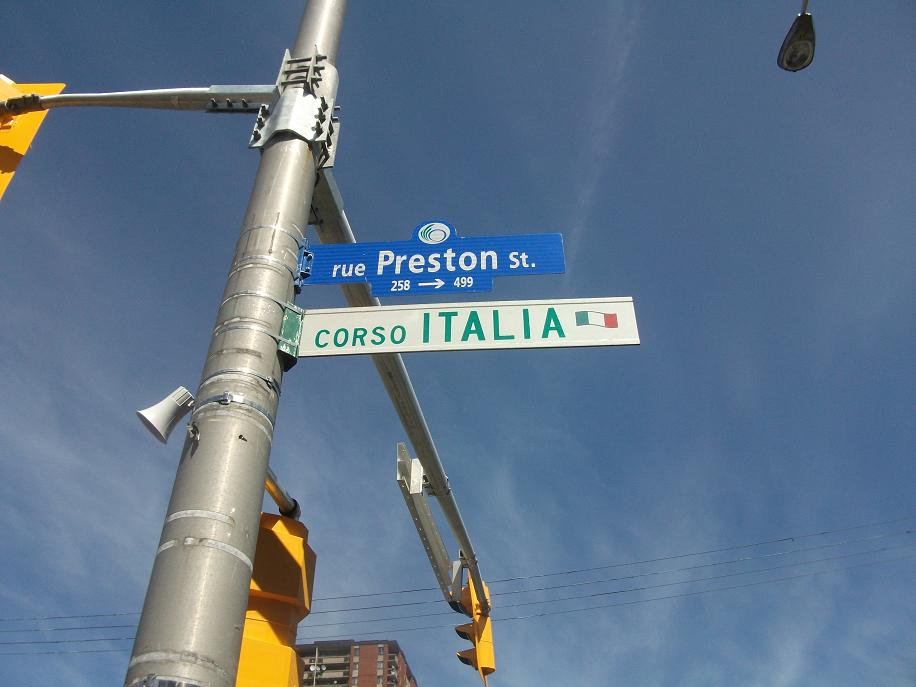
Preston Street sign with "Corso Italia" sign below

Preston Street (Ottawa Road #73) is a street in Ottawa, Ontario, Canada, running between Scott Street in the north and Prince of Wales Drive and Queen Elizabeth Driveway in the south. It is the main commercial artery in Ottawa's Little Italy, home to numerous small business and Italian restaurants, and is synonymous with "Little Italy" to many Ottawa residents when referring to area businesses.

Preston Street is marked at Carling Avenue by a metal arch lit in the colours of the Italian flag, built in 2002 to attract tourists from the Dow's Lake area immediately to the south. At the same intersection is the tallest building in Ottawa, the residential condominium tower Claridge Icon.

Since 1974, Preston and its side streets are closed to traffic each June for the Italian Week festival, Ottawa's celebration of Italian culture. Preston Street has been given a commemorative Italian name Corso Italia.

In 1986, the Preston Street Business Improvement Area was formed, representing local businesses to the City of Ottawa.

In 2015, Preston was temporarily extended north from Albert Street to Kichi Zibi Mikan (then the Macdonald Parkway) in order to serve as the main arterial to Gatineau, Quebec while Booth Street was being closed due to the Confederation Line construction.

Preston is either named for former city treasurer John Honey Preston or alderman George Honey Preston.
