= Claridge Icon =

45-storey condominium tower in Ottawa

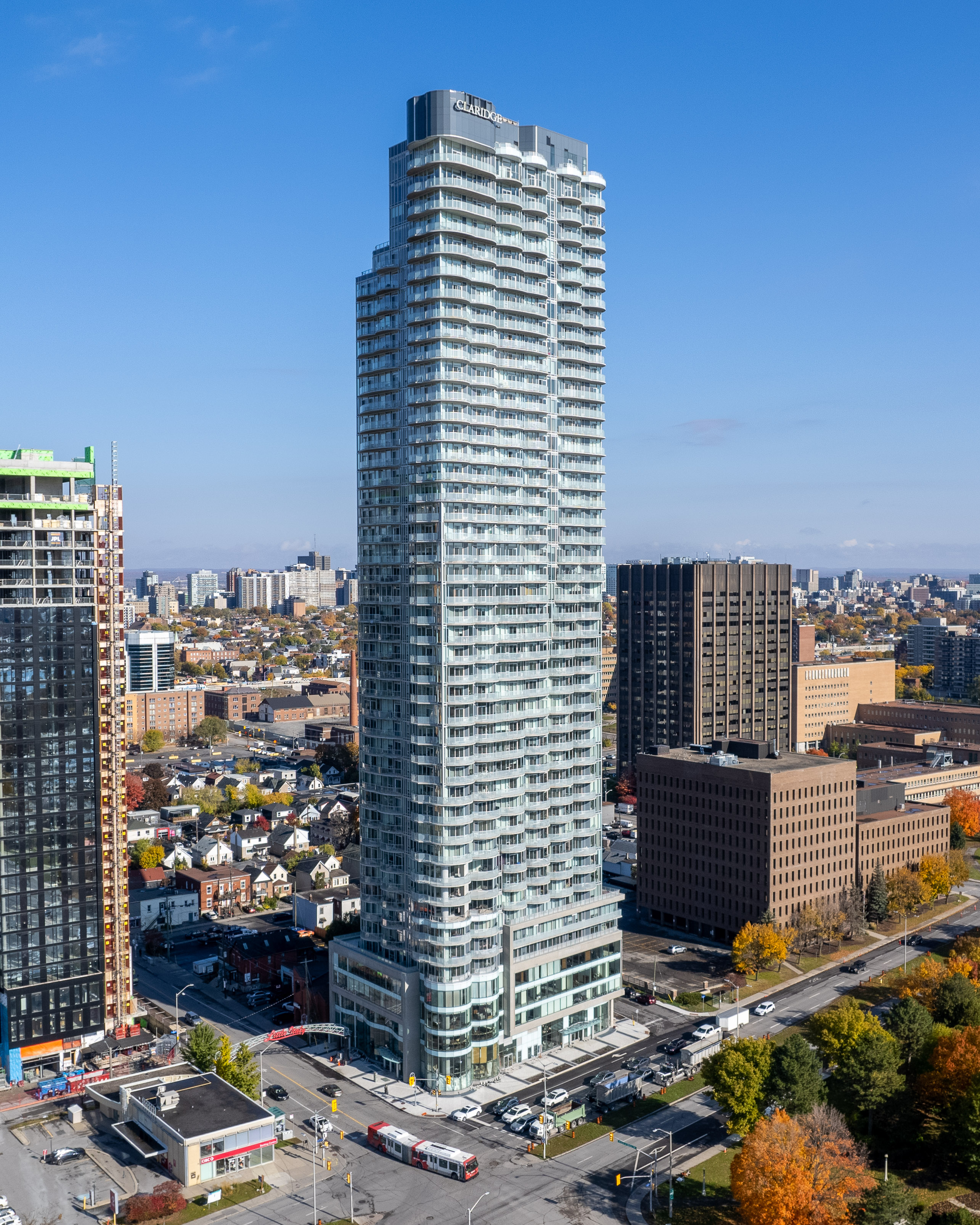
- The Claridge Icon in Little Italy, Ottawa

General information
- Status: Completed
- Location: 805 Carling Ave, Ottawa, Canada
- Coordinates: 45°23′53″N 75°42′27″W
- Groundbreaking: 2015
- Topped-out: 2019
- Completed: 2022
- Opened: 2022

Height
- Height: 143 m (469 ft)

Technical details
- Floor count: 45
- Floor area: 22,047 m^{2} (237,310 sq ft)
- Grounds: 1,646 m^{2} (17,720 sq ft)

Design and construction
- Architecture firm: Hariri Pontarini Architects
- Developer: Claridge Homes
- Engineer: Smith + Andersen
- Main contractor: Bellai Brothers Construction

Other information
- Number of units: 320
- Parking: 303

Website
- claridgehomes.com/condos/claridge-icon

The Claridge Icon is a 45-storey condominium skyscraper in Ottawa, Ontario, Canada. It is located at the intersection of Carling Avenue and Preston Street in Little Italy. When the structure topped out in 2019, it became the tallest building in Ottawa since 1971, and the tallest in Ottawa-Gatineau Region since 1978.

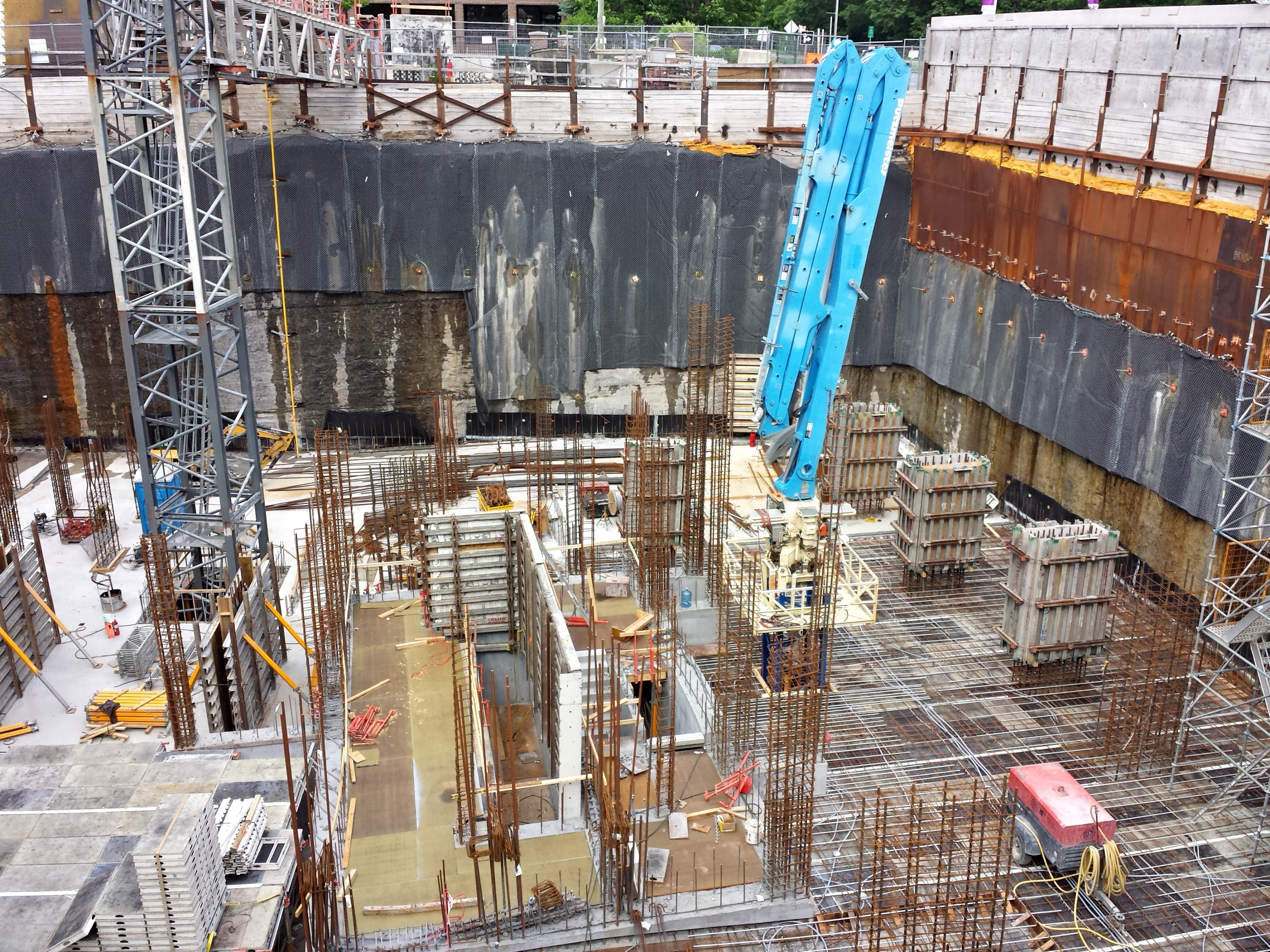
Construction pit for the foundation of Claridge Icon, June 2017

The building was designed by Hariri Pontarini Architects and built by Claridge Homes, but suffered lengthy delays. When first announced in 2012, Claridge aimed for opening in late 2016. Once construction had begun in 2015, it was planned to be ready for occupancy in 2018.

Early during construction in March 2016, a worker was struck and killed by a 12-metre (39 ft) chunk of ice that fell from the side of the construction pit. This resulted in a year-long delay and charges against the developer and main contractor (which were fined $325,000 each in May 2019). Construction work was halted again in March 2018 when a worker fell 3 metres (10 ft) from a platform and suffered a head injury.

== See also ==
- List of tallest buildings in Ottawa–Gatineau
- Architecture of Ottawa
