= Outline of Ottawa =

Overview of and topical guide to Ottawa

The following outline is provided as an overview of and topical guide to Ottawa:

Ottawa is the capital city of Canada. It is located in Southern Ontario on the southern shore of the Ottawa River. Ottawa was historically an indigenous trading spot for the Algonquin and Mississaugas. Its modern history began in 1610 when the first European settler came to the area. The settlement was founded as Bytown in 1826, and incorporated as Ottawa in 1855.

== General reference ==
- Pronunciation: (/ˈɒtəwə/, /ˈɒtəwɑː/; French pronunciation: [ɔtawa])

== Geography of Ottawa ==
City of Ottawa map

Location of Ontario

Geography of Ottawa

- Ottawa is: a city in Ontario and the national capital of Canada

=== Location of Ottawa ===
- Ottawa is situated in the following regions:
  - Northern Hemisphere, Western Hemisphere
    - Americas
      - North America
        - Northern America
          - Laurentia
            - Canada
              - Central Canada
              - Eastern Canada
                - Canadian Shield
                  - Ontario
                    - Southern Ontario
                      - Eastern Ontario
                        - Nation Capital Region
  - Time zone: Eastern Standard Time (UTC-05), Eastern Daylight Time (UTC-04)

=== Geographic features of Ottawa ===
- Geography of Ottawa
  - Native trees in Ottawa
  - Ottawa River
  - Rideau River
  - Jock River
  - Carp River
  - Mississippi River
  - Madawaska River
  - Castor River
  - Rideau Canal
  - Dow's Lake
  - Chaudière Falls
  - Rideau Falls
  - Hog's Back Falls

==== Areas of Ottawa ====
- Neighbourhoods in Ottawa

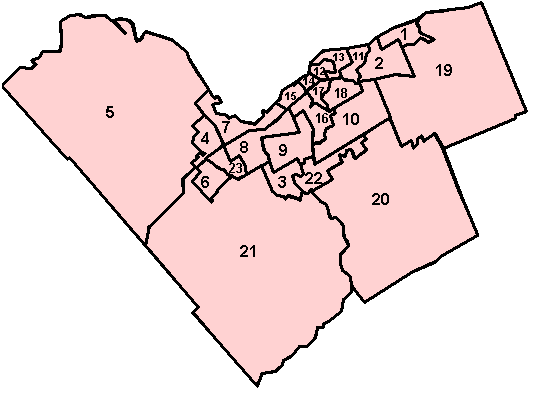
Ottawa wards map

- Wards of the City of Ottawa
  - Orléans Ward
  - Innes Ward
  - Barrhaven Ward
  - Kanata North Ward
  - West Carleton-March Ward
  - Stittsville Ward
  - Bay Ward
  - College Ward
  - Knoxdale-Merivale Ward
  - Gloucester-Southgate Ward
  - Beacon Hill-Cyrville Ward
  - Rideau-Vanier Ward
  - Rideau-Rockcliffe Ward
  - Somerset Ward
  - Kitchissippi Ward
  - River Ward
  - Capital Ward
  - Alta Vista Ward
  - Cumberland Ward
  - Osgoode Ward
  - Rideau-Jock Ward
  - Gloucester-South Nepean Ward
  - Kanata South Ward
- Former cities, townships, and villages prior to amalgamation
  - Regional Municipality of Ottawa–Carleton
    - City of Ottawa
    - Nepean
    - Kanata
    - Gloucester
    - Vanier
    - Cumberland
    - Rockcliffe Park
    - West Carleton
    - Goulbourn
    - Rideau
    - Osgoode

==== Locations in Ottawa ====
- Museums in Ottawa
  - National museums in Ottawa
- Ottawa Public Library branches
- Shopping malls in Ottawa

===== Parks in Ottawa =====
- Parks in Ottawa
- Capital Pathway
- Ottawa Greenbelt
- Mer Bleue Conservation Area
- Gatineau Park

==== Historic locations in Ottawa ====
- List of historic places in Ottawa
  - List of designated heritage properties in Ottawa
  - List of National Historic Sites of Canada in Ottawa

== Government and politics of Ottawa ==
Government and politics of Ottawa

- Municipal elections of Ottawa
  - List of mayors of Ottawa
  - Ottawa City Council
  - Ottawa City Council members
- National Capital Commission
- List of diplomatic missions in Ottawa

== History of Ottawa ==
- History of Ottawa
  - Timeline of Ottawa history
    - Great 1900 Fire of Ottawa
    - Parliament building fire 1916
    - 1929 Ottawa explosion
    - Greber Plan

== Culture in Ottawa ==
=== Architecture ===
- Architecture of Ottawa
  - List of tallest buildings in Ottawa
  - List of buildings in Ottawa

=== Demographics of Ottawa ===
- Demographics of Ottawa
- Bilingualism in Ottawa
- List of people from Ottawa

=== Arts ===
- List of festivals in Ottawa
- Media in Ottawa–Gatineau
- Museums in Ottawa
- Symbols of Ottawa
  - Flag of Ottawa
  - Coat of arms of Ottawa
- Cinemas in Ottawa
- Ottawa International Film Festival
- Ottawa International Animation Festival
- Canadian Film Institute

==== Music of Ottawa ====
- Ottawa Bluesfest
- CityFolk Festival
- Ottawa Jazz Festival
- Escapade Music Festival

=== Religion in Ottawa ===
- List of religious buildings in Ottawa
  - Christianity in Ottawa
    - List of Ottawa churches
    - Roman Catholic Archdiocese of Ottawa
    - Anglican Diocese of Ottawa
  - Judaism in Ottawa
    - List of synagogues in Ottawa
    - History of the Jews in Ottawa
  - Islam in Ottawa
    - List of mosques in Ottawa

=== Sports in Ottawa ===
Sport in Ottawa

- Ice hockey in Ottawa
  - Ottawa Senators (National Hockey League)
    - List of Ottawa Senators seasons
    - List of Ottawa Senators players
    - List of Ottawa Senators head coaches
    - List of Ottawa Senators general managers
    - History of the Ottawa Senators (1992–)
    - List of Ottawa Senators records
    - List of Ottawa Senators award winners
    - List of Ottawa Senators draft picks
    - Ottawa Senators (original)
  - Ottawa 67's (Ontario Hockey League)
  - Ottawa Charge (Professional Women's Hockey League)
- Basketball in Ottawa
  - Ottawa Blackjacks (Canadian Elite Basketball League)
- Football in Ottawa
  - Ottawa Redblacks (Canadian Football League)
    - List of Ottawa Redblacks seasons
    - Ottawa Redblacks all-time records and statistics
    - Ottawa Football Clubs all-time records and statistics
- Soccer in Ottawa
  - Atlético Ottawa (Canadian Premier League)
- Running in Ottawa
  - Ottawa Race Weekend

== Economy and infrastructure of Ottawa ==
=== Ottawa Economy ===
- List of companies based in Ottawa

=== Services in Ottawa ===
- List of hospitals in Ottawa
- Ottawa Fire Services
- Ottawa Police Service
- Ottawa Paramedic Service
- Ottawa Public Library

=== Tourism in Ottawa ===
- List of tourist attractions in Ottawa
  - Casino du Lac-Leamy
  - Hard Rock Casino

=== Transportation in Ottawa ===
- Transportation in Ottawa
  - List of airports in the Ottawa area
  - List of roads in Ottawa
  - List of numbered roads in Ottawa
  - List of bridges in Ottawa
    - List of crossings of the Ottawa River
- OC Transpo
  - OC Transpo routes
  - Paratranspo
  - Transitway (Ottawa)
  - O-Train
    - Line 1
    - Line 2
    - List of O-Train stations
  - Société de transport de l'Outaouais
  - Ottawa station
    - Fallowfield station

== Education in Ottawa ==
- List of schools in Ottawa
- Elementary and secondary public schools in Ottawa
  - Ottawa-Carleton District School Board
    - List of schools of the Ottawa-Carleton District School Board
  - Ottawa Catholic School Board
    - List of schools of the Ottawa Catholic School Board
  - Conseil des écoles publiques de l'Est de l'Ontario
    - List of schools of the Conseil des écoles publiques de l'Est de l'Ontario
  - Conseil des écoles catholiques de langue française du Centre-Est
    - List of schools of the Conseil des écoles catholiques de langue française du Centre-Est

=== Universities and Colleges ===
- University of Ottawa
    - University of Ottawa Faculty of Social Sciences
    - University of Ottawa Faculty of Medicine
    - Telfer School of Management
    - University of Ottawa Faculty of Law
  - Ottawa Gee-Gees
  - Saint Paul University
  - List of University of Ottawa people
- Carleton University
    - Sprott School of Business
    - Norman Paterson School of International Affairs
  - Carleton Ravens
  - Dominican University College
  - List of Carleton University people
- Algonquin College
- Collège La Cité

== See also ==
- Outline of geography
  - Outline of North America
    - Outline of Canada
      - Outline of Ontario
- Franco-Ontarian
  - List of francophone communities in Ontario
