= List of churches in Ottawa =

Ottawa churches

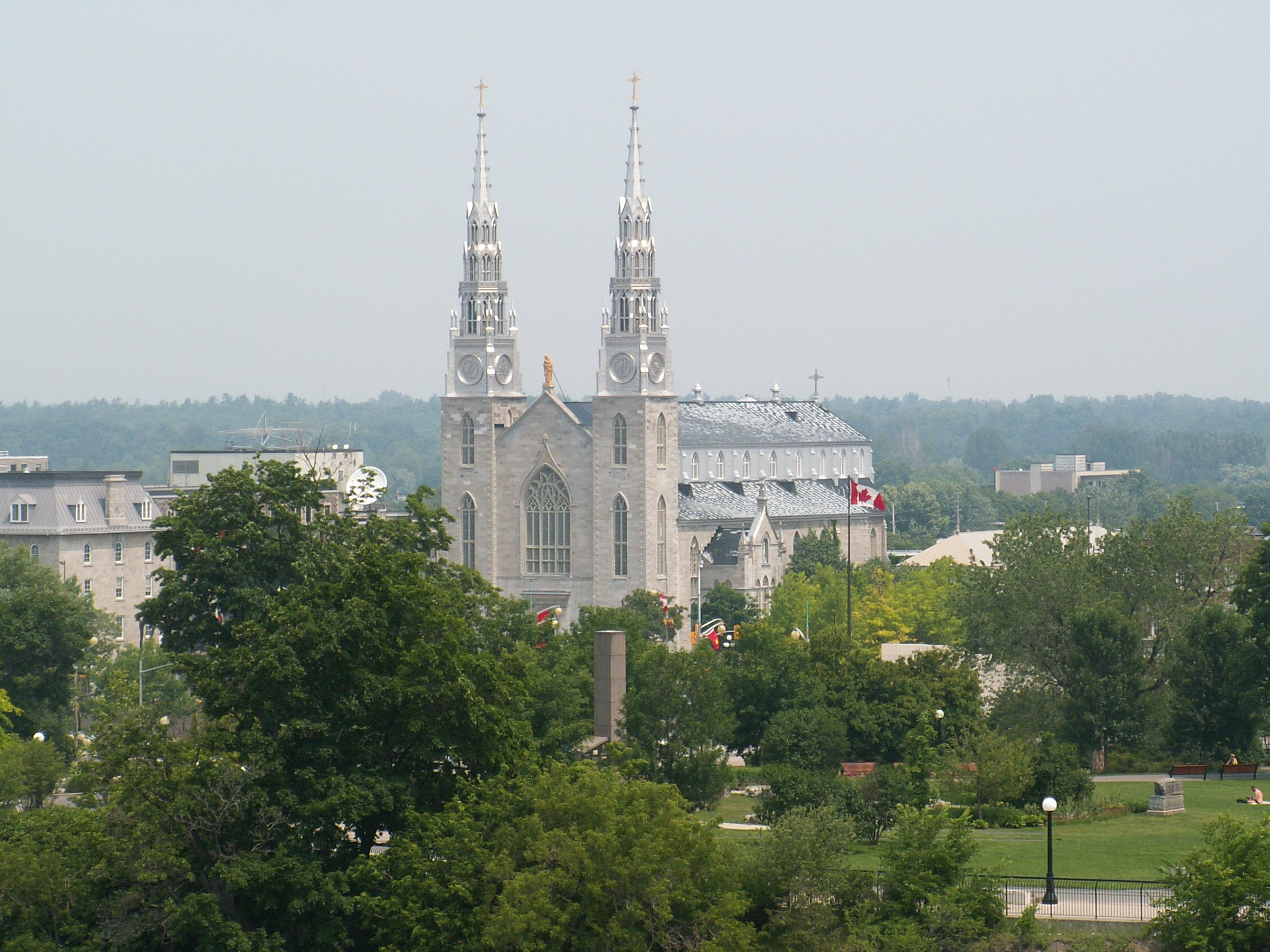
Notre-Dame Cathedral Basilica, the oldest and largest church in Ottawa, is a National Historic Site of Canada and the central church of the Catholic Archdiocese of Ottawa-Cornwall.

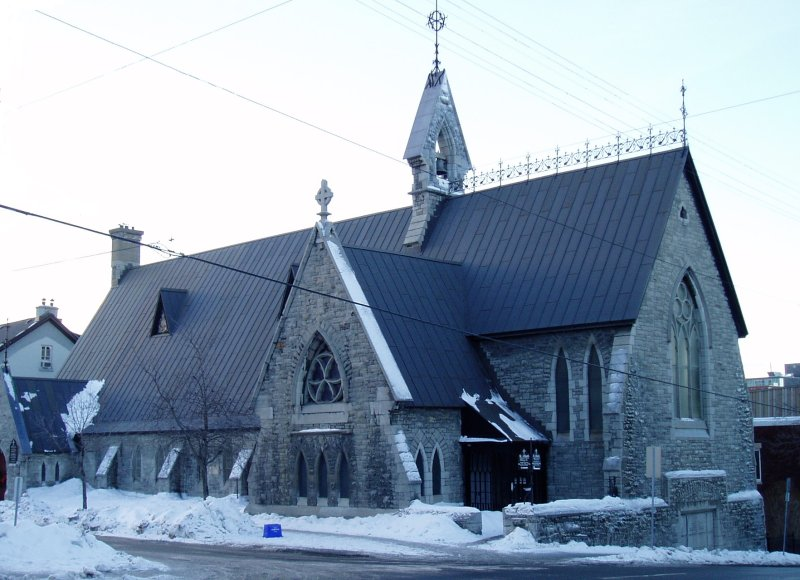
St. Alban's Anglican Church is Ottawa's oldest surviving church building and was attended by many of Canada's early political leaders, including Canada's first prime minister John A. Macdonald.

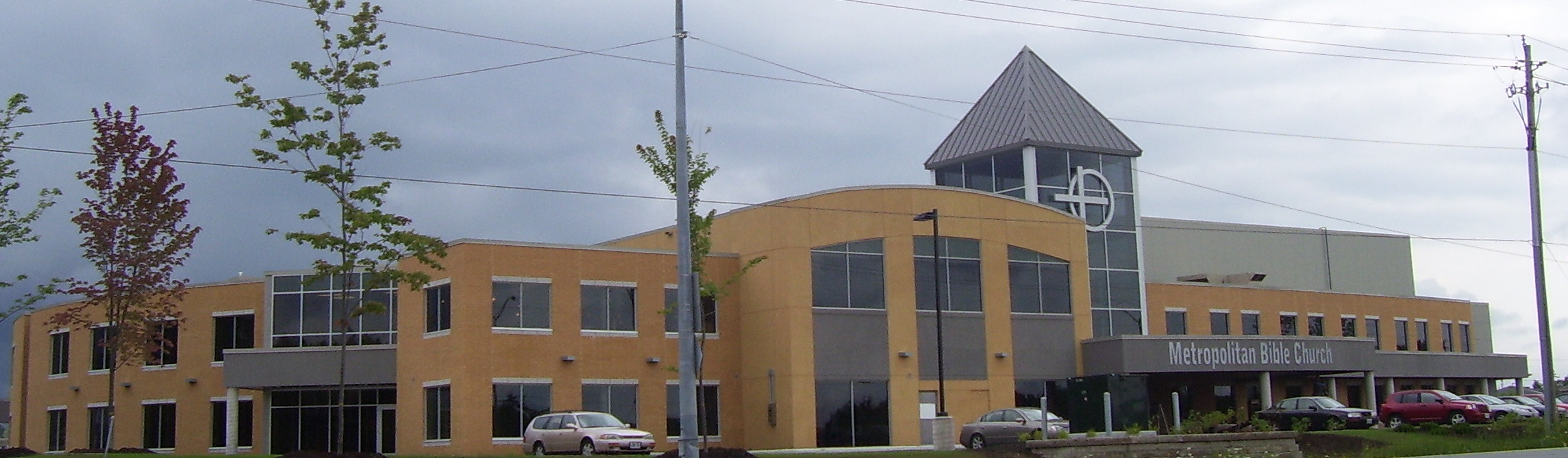
The MET is a church in Ottawa's south end.

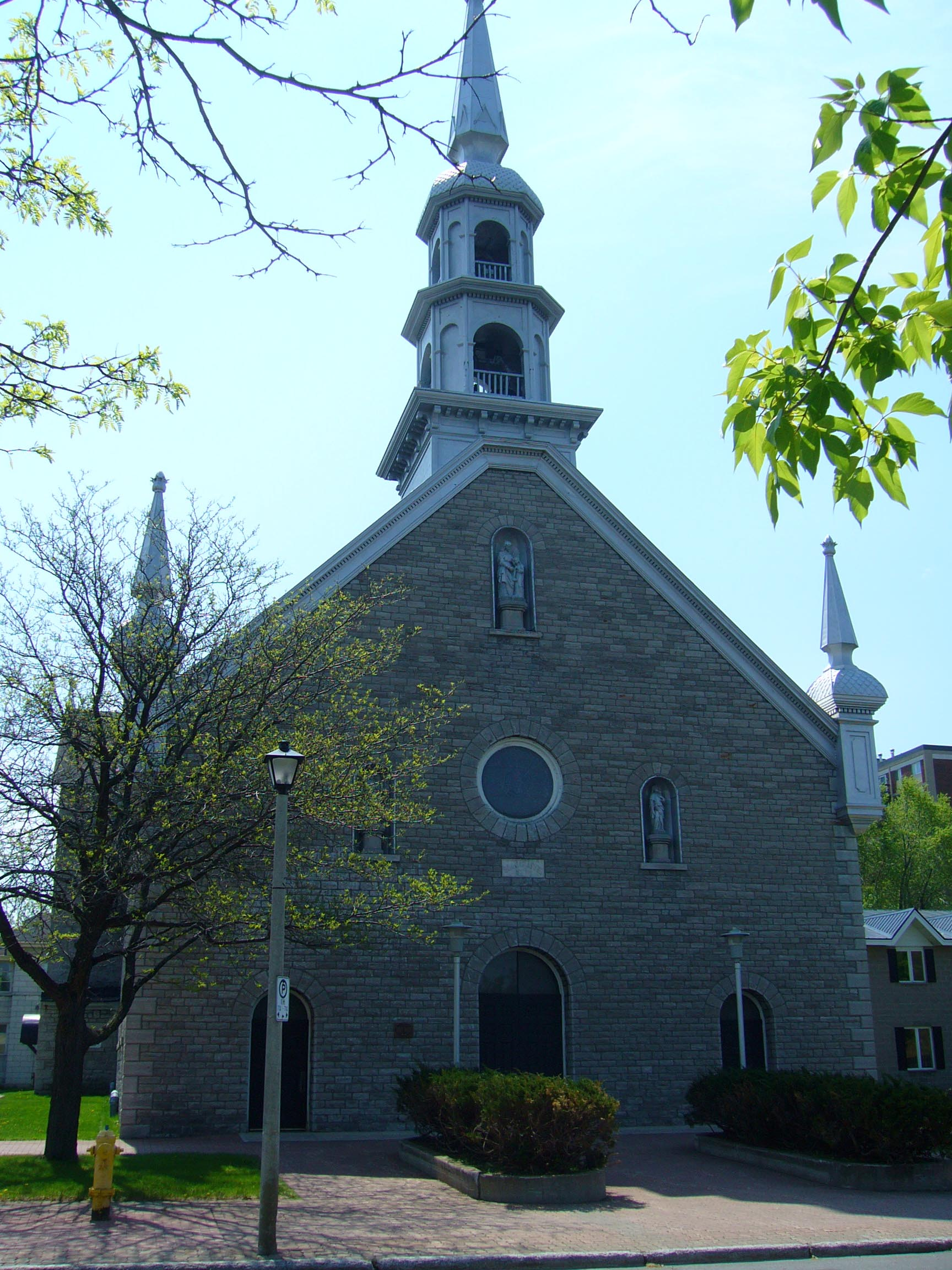
Ste-Anne Catholic Church is a rare example of Québecois church architecture in Ontario. It is home to St. Clement Parish, a Catholic community which continues to use the traditional Latin liturgy.

== Catholic ==
=== Latin Church ===
==== Archdiocese of Ottawa-Cornwall ====
The Archdiocese of Ottawa-Cornwall includes several parishes outside the city limits, which have been included in the list. Francophone communities are marked with a fleur-de-lys:.

- Annunciation of the Lord
- L'Ascension de Notre-Seigneur-Jésus-Christ
- Assumption of the Blessed Virgin Mary (Filipino national parish)
- B.V. Marie-Médiatrice de toutes-les-grâces
- Blessed Sacrament Catholic Church, designed by M.J. Morton, 1932
- Divine Infant
- Good Shepherd
- Holy Canadian Martyrs
- Holy Cross
- Holy Korean Martyrs (Korean national parish)
- Holy Name of Mary
- Holy Redeemer
- Holy Spirit
- Immaculate Heart of Mary
- Lift Jesus Higher
- Madonna Della Risurrezione (Italian national parish)
- Marie-Médiatrice (Burundian national parish)
- Nativité de Notre-Seigneur-Jésus-Christ
- Notre-Dame Cathedral Basilica (Bilingual), designed by Antoine Robillard, Fr John Francis Cannon, and Fr Pierre-Adrien Telmon. It is the cathedral of the Archdiocese of Ottawa and is the largest and oldest church in the city. It is the only church in Ottawa which is also a national historic site.
- Notre-Dame-de-Lourdes
- Notre-Dame des Champs
- Our Lady of Divine Love
- Our Lady of Fatima
- Our Lady of La Vang (Vietnamese national parish)
- Our Lady of Mount Carmel
- Our Lady of the Miraculous Medal
- Our Lady of the Visitation
- Queen of the Most Holy Rosary
- Resurrection of Our Lord
- Sacré-Coeur (Bourget)
- Sacré-Coeur (Sandy Hill), designed by Louis Zephirin Gauthier, 1888–93; tower and entrance, 1899; interior decoration by Victor Roy 1893.
- Sagrada Familia (Spanish national parish)
- Senhor Santo Cristo (Portuguese national parish)
- Sheng Shen Chinese Catholic Church (Chinese national parish)
- St-Albert
- St. Albertus Pfarrgemeinde (German national parish)
- St-Alphonse de Liguori
- St. Andrew
- Ste-Anne Catholic Church (Lowertown), designed 1873 by J.P. LeCourt. Parish closed 2013; now home to St. Clement Parish.
- Ste-Anne (Ste-Anne-de-Prescott)
- St. Anthony of Padua (Italian national parish), designed by Guido Nincheri, 1925.
- St. Augustine
- St. Basil
- St-Benoît-Labre
- St-Bernard (Fournier)
- St. Bernard (Ottawa)
- St-Bernardin
- St-Bonaventure
- St. Brigid (Byward Market), designed 1888-1890 by James R. Bowes, closed 2007. Now home to Saint Brigid's Centre for the Arts.
- St. Brigid (Manotick)
- St-Charles Borromée (Congolese national parish)
- St-Claude
- St. Catherine
- St. Clare
- St. Clement Parish (Bilingual), building closed 2013, with the community now meeting at Ste-Anne Catholic Church. Uses the traditional liturgy of 1962.
- St. Declan
- St-Dominique
- St. Edith Stein
- St. Elizabeth (also serving the Hungarian Catholic community)
- St-Eugène
- St-Euphémie
- Ste-Famille
- Ste-Félicité
- St-François d'Assise and Capuchin Monastery, Richmond Road, designed by Joseph Simeon Jude Routhier 1891; Church at Wellington Street at Fairmont Street designed by Charles Brodeur, 1914-15
- St. Gabriel (Woodlawn)
- St-Gabriel (Ottawa)
- Ste-Geneviève
- St. George
- St-Grégoire de Nazianze
- St-Guillaume
- St-Hugues
- St. Hyacinth (Polish)
- St. Ignatius
- St. Isidore (Ottawa)
- St. Isidore (St-Isidore)
- St-Jacques
- St-Jean-Baptiste (L'Orignal)
- St-Jean-Baptiste (Ottawa) designed by Father Joseph Michaud 1883-84.
- St-Joachin
- St. John the Apostle
- St. John the Evangelist
- St. Joseph (Sandy Hill)
- St-Joseph (Orleans)
- St. Jude
- St-Laurent
- St-Léon-le-Grand
- St. Leonard
- St. Leopold Mandic (Croatian national parish)
- St-Luc
- St-Louis-Marie-de-Montfort
- St. Martin de Porres
- St-Mathieu
- St. Margaret Mary (Cumberland; bilingual)
- St. Margaret Mary (Glebe)
- Ste-Marie (Orleans)
- St. Mary (Centretown West), designed by Auguste Martineau 1949-50
- St. Maurice
- St. Michael (Carp)
- St. Michael (Fitzroy Harbour)
- St. Monica
- St-Pascal-Baylon
- St. Patrick's Basilica, designed by Augustus Laver, 1868, and completed in 1875 by King McCord Arnoldi.
- St. Patrick's (Fallowfield)
- St-Paul
- St. Peter
- St. Peter Celestine
- St. Philip
- St-Pierre, Apôtre
- St-Rémi
- St-Sébastien
- St. Theresa of the Child Jesus, designed by Henry Joseph Morin, completed 1933.
- Ste-Thérèse d'Avila
- St-Thomas
- St-Thomas d'Aquin
- Ste-Trinité
- St-Viateur
- St. Victor

==== Personal Ordinariate of the Chair of Saint Peter ====
- Annunciation of the Blessed Virgin Mary

==== Roman Catholic Military Ordinariate of Canada ====
- Our Lady of the Airways Chapel (see Ecumenical below)

=== Melkite (Greek) Catholic Church ===
- Saints Peter and Paul Melkite Catholic Church

=== Syriac Maronite Church of Antioch ===
- Saint Charbel Maronite Catholic Church

=== Syriac Catholic Church ===
- Saint Paul Syriac Catholic Mission

=== Ukrainian Greek Catholic Church ===
- St. John the Baptist Ukrainian Catholic Shrine

=== Canonically irregular groups ===
- Society of St Pius X Mission, meeting at the Holy Ghost Chapel.

== Old Catholic Church ==
- Mission Parish of St. Aelred Old Roman Catholic.

== Christian Science ==
- First Church of Christ, Scientist, designed by John Pritchard MacLaren 1913–14.

== Gnostic Catholic Apostolic Church (EGCA) ==
- Gnostic Church of Ottawa-Gatineau

== Ecumenical ==
Canadian Forces Support Unit Ottawa Chaplain Services

- Canadian Forces Ottawa Chapel houses "Our Lady of the Airways" Our Lady of the Airways Chapel and "Elizabeth Park Protestant Congregation". These are the ecumenical faith communities meeting in the Uplands Site chapel (337 Breadner Boulevard, Gloucester) located beside Ottawa's International Airport on the former Canadian Forces Uplands Military Base.(45.334439°N 75.662026°W ) These worshiping communities are part of the Canadian Forces Support Unit Ottawa Chaplain Services and have regular Roman Catholic and Protestant services serving military members and their families in the National Capital Region. As well, there is assistance for other denominations.

== Orthodox ==
=== Eastern Orthodox ===
==== American Carpatho-Russian Orthodox Diocese ====
- Christ the Saviour

==== Greek Orthodox Archdiocese of Canada ====
- Kimisis Tis Theotokos (Dormition of the Theotokos)

==== Antiochian Orthodox Christian Archdiocese of North America ====
- St. Elias Cathedral
- St. Elijah Antiochian Orthodox Church, built 1950. The church was sold in 1989, with the community moving to St. Elias Cathedral, and the building was converted to St. Elijah's Housing.

==== Orthodox Church in America ====
- Annunciation Cathedral

==== Romanian Orthodox Church ====
- St. Matthew
- St. Nicholas

==== Russian Orthodox Church Outside Russia ====
- Protection of the Holy Virgin Memorial Church
- St. Xenia of Petersburg

==== Serbian Orthodox Church ====
- St. Stefan
- Meeting of the Lord - Serbian Orthodox Parish (Ottawa)

==== Ukrainian Orthodox Church of Canada ====
- Assumption of the Blessed Virgin Mary Cathedral

=== Oriental Orthodox ===
==== Coptic Orthodox Church ====
- St. George and St. Anthony
- St. Mark and St. Mary of Egypt
- St. Mary

==== Ethiopian Orthodox Tewahedo Church ====
- St. Teklehaimanot

==== Eritrean Orthodox Church ====
- Kidus Gabriel

==== Armenian Orthodox Church ====
- St. Mesrob

== Protestant ==
=== Anglican ===
==== Anglican Church of Canada ====
===== Diocese of Ottawa =====
- All Saints' Sandy Hill, building closed 2014, with the community now meeting at St Margaret's Church.
- All Saints' Anglican Church Westboro
- Christ Church Ashton, sharing a building with First United Church (Ottawa)
- Christ Church Bells Corners
- Christ Church Cathedral, designed 1872-73 by the King McCord Arnoldi. Cathedral of the Anglican Diocese of Ottawa
- Church of the Ascension
- Church of the Resurrection, sharing a building with Riverside United Church
- Epiphany Anglican Church
- Good Shepherd Anglican Lutheran Ministry
- Holy Trinity, North Gower
- Parish of Bearbrook, Vars, & Navan
  - St. Andrew's, Vars
  - St. Mark's, Cumberland
  - St. Mary's, Navan
  - St. Mary the Virgin, Blackburn
  - Trinity, Bearbrook
- Parish of Fitzroy Harbour
  - St. George's, Fitzroy Harbour
  - St. Thomas, Woodlawn
- Parish of Huntley
  - Christ Church
  - St. James the Apostle
  - St. John's Church
- Parish of Kars-Osgoode
  - St. John's Anglican Church Kars
  - St. Paul's Anglican Church Osgoode
- Parish of March
  - St John’s Anglican Church
  - St Mary’s Anglican Church
  - St Paul’s Anglican Church
- Parish of Metcalfe, Greely, and Vernon
  - Holy Trinity Metcalfe
  - All Saints' Greely
  - St. George's Vernon
- St. Aidan's Anglican Church
- St. Alban the Martyr
- St. Barnabas, Apostle and Martyr Anglican Church
- St. Bartholomew's Anglican Church
- St. Columba Anglican Church
- St. Helen's Anglican Church
- St. James the Apostle, Manotick
- St. James' Anglican Church Leitrim
- St. James the Apostle
- St. John the Baptist Anglican Church, Richmond
- St. John the Evangelist
- St. Luke's, by Charles Penruddocke William Kivas Band 1903-04
- St. Margaret's Church, merged with All Saints' Sandy Hill in 2014
- St. Mark the Evangelist Anglican Church, by James Strutt (1954) designated heritage
- St. Martin's Anglican Church
- St. Matthew's Anglican Church
- St. Matthias Anglican Church
- St. Michael and All Angels Ottawa
- St. Paul's Anglican Church by James Strutt (1963-1964)
- St. Richard's Anglican Church
- St. Stephen's Anglican Church
- St. Thomas the Apostle Anglican Church, Alta Vista
- St Thomas Anglican Church, Stittsville
- Trinity Anglican Church

==== Anglican Church in North America ====
- Blackburn Hamlet Community Church
- Church of the Messiah
- St. Peter & St. Paul's Anglican Church

==== Anglican Catholic Church ====
- St. Matthew the Apostle

==== The Anglican Mission in Canada ====
- HUB Ottawa

=== Associated Gospel ===
- Community Bible Church
- Metropolitan Bible Church (a.k.a. "The Met")
- Trinity Bible Church of Ottawa

=== Baptist ===
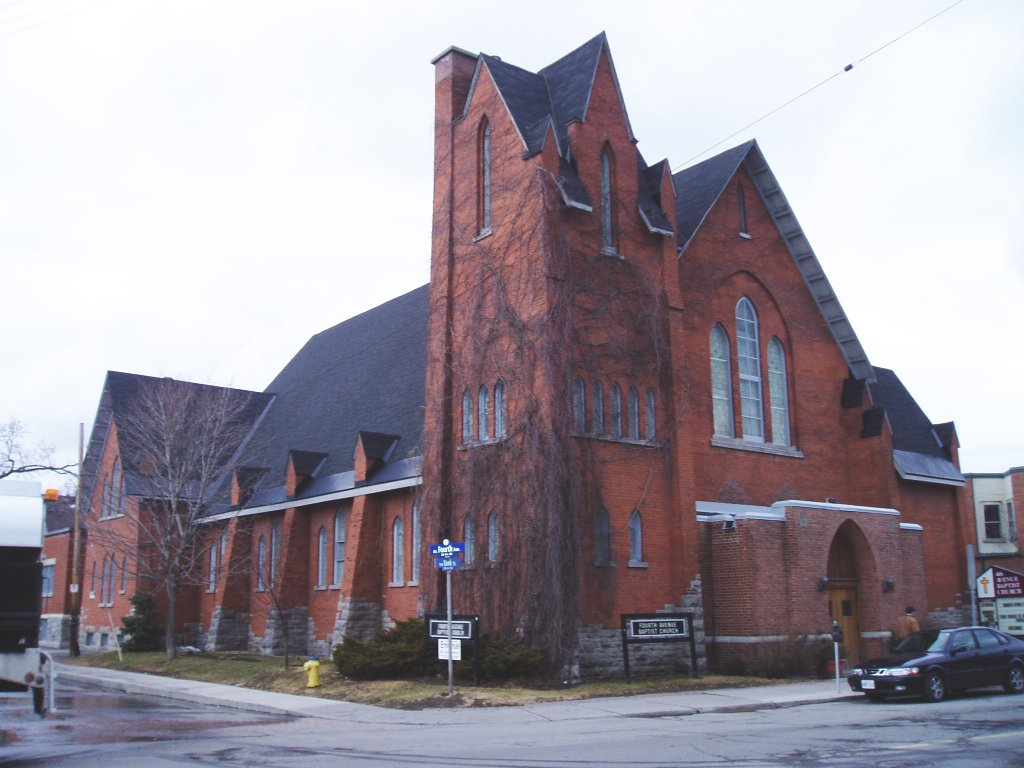
Fourth Avenue Baptist Church in the Glebe

- First Baptist Church
- Grace Baptist Church Ottawa
- McPhail Memorial Baptist Church
- The Crossroads Church
- Calvary Baptist Church
- Alta Vista Baptist Church
- Fourth Avenue Baptist Church
- Fellowship Baptist Church of Kanata
- Kanata Baptist Church
- Bethany Baptist Church
- Bromley Road Baptist Church
- Bilberry Creek Baptist Orleans
- Eglise Evangelique Baptiste d'Orleans
- Centre Évangélique Francophone d'Ottawa (CEFO)
- Britannia Baptist Church
- Sequoia Community Church
- Celebration! Church
- Parkdale Baptist Church
- Crosspoint Baptist Church

=== Charismatic Churches ===
- Abundant Life Christian Fellowship
- Barrhaven New Life Church
- Vineyard Ottawa
- Catch The Fire Ottawa

=== Christian Brethren ===
- Rideauview Bible Chapel
- Bridlewood Bible Chapel
- Downtown Outreach Bible Chapel
- Ottawa Gospel Hall

=== Christian and Missionary Alliance (C&MA) ===
- Cedarview Alliance Church
- East Gate Alliance Church
- Eglise Biblique de la Grace Divine
- Emmanuel Alliance Church of Ottawa
- Filipino Community Church
- Ottawa Chinese Alliance Church
- Redeemer Alliance Church
- Agape Chinese Alliance Church
- Ottawa Mandarin Alliance Church
- Pathway Church Kanata

=== Evangelical ===
==== Evangelical Free Church of Canada ====
- Ottawa Chinese Bible Church

==== Evangelical Missionary Church of Canada ====
- Rhema International Church

The Salvation Army in Canada

- The Salvation Army Ottawa Citadel
- The Salvation Army Barrhaven Church

=== Lutheran ===
==== Canadian Association of Lutheran Congregations ====
- All Saints Lutheran Church

==== Evangelical Lutheran Church in Canada ====
- Faith Evangelical Lutheran Church
- German Evangelical Martin Luther Church
- Good Shepherd Anglican Lutheran Ministry
- Mount Calvary Lutheran Church
- Peace Latvian Evangelical Lutheran Church
- Resurrection Lutheran Church
- St. John Evangelical Lutheran Church
- St. Peter's Evangelical Lutheran Church

==== Lutheran Church–Canada ====
- Christ Risen Lutheran Church
- Iglesia Luterana Unidos en Cristo
- Our Saviour Lutheran Church
- St. Luke Lutheran Church

==== Wisconsin Evangelical Lutheran Synod ====
- Abiding Word Lutheran Church
- Divine Word Lutheran Church
- St. Paul Lutheran Church

=== Mennonite ===
- Ottawa Mennonite Church
- Church of the Living Word, whose worship service is held in Amharic
- The Village IMC, which meets at the Centre Richelieu in Vanier

==== Mennonite Brethren ====
- The Gathering

=== Methodist ===
See also United Church of Canada below

==== Free Methodist Church in Canada ====
- Arlington Woods Free Methodist Church
- Chapel Ridge Free Methodist Church
- Ecclesiax Free Methodist Church
- Église Methodiste Libre De La Derniere Heure

==== Independent Holiness Church ====
- Metcalfe Holiness Church
- Shiloh Holiness Church

=== Pentecostal ===
==== Church of God Canada ====
- The Ottawa Church of God
- Romanian Evangelical Church of God

==== Pentecostal Assemblies of Canada ====
- Bethel Pentecostal Church
- Comm Pent Church of Ottawa
- Grace Assembly
- Iglesia La Vid (meets at Nepean Baptist Church)
- Lifecentre
- Lifecentre Kanata
- Living Waters Christian Assembly (formerly The Westend Church)
- The Oasis
- Parkway Road Pentecostal Church
- Peace Tower Church
- Pentecostal Community Church
- Vanier Community Church
- Woodvale Pentecostal Church

==== Other ====
- All Nations Full Gospel Church
- Church of Grace Ottawa, 2 services in English and Tamil; meets at Carleton University.
- Church of Hope, with services in Tamil.
- The Church of Pentecost Canada, Ottawa Assembly
- Église le Centre
- Église Nouveau Départ de Rockland
- Elizabeth Park Protestant Congregation, Uplands (Old Uplands Air Base)
- Grace Assembly Pentecostal Church
- Greatness Church Ottawa
- International Revival Church, Ottawa
- Kingdom Culture Ministries
- Dominion House: Mahanaim International Ministries
- Mount Zion Church of the Firstborn
- myChurch meets at Algonquin Commons Theatre
- New Beginning Church of Rockland
- New Hope Community Church
- Overflowing Glory Bible Church
- The Redeemed Christian Church of God Overcomer's Chapel
- Shiloh Holiness Church
- Shoreline Community Church

=== Presbyterian ===
==== Presbyterian Church in Canada ====
===== Presbytery of Ottawa =====
The Presbytery of Ottawa also includes two churches outside the city limits: St. Andrew Presbyterian Church in Aylmer, and Upper Room Presbyterian Church in Rockland.

- Calvin Hungarian Presbyterian Church
- Gloucester Presbyterian Church
- Grace Presbyterian Church
- Knox Presbyterian Church Manotick
- Knox Presbyterian Church
- Osgoode Presbyterian Church
- Parkwood Presbyterian Church
- pccbarrhaven, meeting at St. Emily's school in Barrhaven
- St. Andrew's Presbyterian Church (Kars)
- St. Andrew's Presbyterian Church (Ottawa)
- St. Andrew's Presbyterian Church (Richmond)
- St. Andrew's Presbyterian Church (Stittsville)
- St. David & St. Martin Presbyterian Church
- St.Giles' Presbyterian Church
- St. Paul's Presbyterian Church by James Strutt 1959
- St. Stephen's Presbyterian Church
- St Timothy's Presbyterian Church by Burgess, McLean & MacPhadyen 1959
- Trinity Presbyterian Church
- Westminster Presbyterian Church

==== Presbyterian Church in America ====
- Resurrection Church

==== Reformed Presbyterian Church of North America ====
- Ottawa Reformed Presbyterian Church

=== Reformed ===
==== Christian Reformed Church ====
- Barrhaven Fellowship Christian Reformed Church
- Calvary Christian Reformed Church
- Calvin Christian Reformed Church
- Kanata Community Christian Reformed Church
- Living Hope Community Church

==== Canadian and American Reformed Churches ====
- Jubilee Canadian Reformed Church

=== Seventh-day Adventist Church ===
- Eglise Adventiste Francophone d'Ottawa
- Hope Central Adventist Group
- Lily of the Valley Adventist Company
- Kanata Adventist Company
- Nepean Adventist Church
- Orleans Adventist Church
- Orleans French Adventist Church
- Ottawa Adventist Church
- Ottawa French Adventist Church
- Ottawa East Adventist Church
- Ottawa Spanish Adventist Company
- West French Group

=== Unaffiliated ===
- Abundant Life Christian Fellowship
- Calvary Baptist Church
- City View International Church
- Chinese Christian Church of Ottawa
- Mercy Community Church
- Metcalfe Street Church
- Christ Embassy Church
- Life Meetings Ottawa
- Living Rock Church
- Local Church
- myChurch
- Ottawa River of Life Christian Church
- Pine Grove Bible Church
- Renewal Church Ottawa
- Smiths Falls Bethel Pentecostal Church
- Transforming Life Centre
- Grace City Church Ottawa
- Crosspointe Ministries
- The Ottawa Church of Christ
- South Asian Christian Fellowship Of Ottawa meets at 3123, Carp Road

=== United Church of Canada ===
==== Ottawa Presbytery ====
- Ashton United Church
- Barrhaven United Church
- Bell's Corners United Church by James Strutt (1962)
- Bethany United Church
- Bethel United Church
- Britannia United Church
- Carleton Memorial United Church
- Carsonby United Church
- Centretown United Church
- City View United Church
- Dominion-Chalmers United Church
- Dunrobin United Church
- Emmanuel United Church
- Fallowfield United Church
- First United Church, historic building closed 2007, now meeting at All Saints' Westboro.
- Glebe-St. James United Church
- Glen Cairn United Church
- Hawthorne United Church
- Kanata United Church
- Kitchissippi United Church
- Knox Edwards United Church
- Knox United Church
- MacKay United Church
- Manotick United Church
- Merivale United Church
- Metcalfe United Church
- Munster United Church
- Navan-Vars United Church
- North Gower United Church
- Northwestern United Church
- Orleans United Church
- Ottawa Chinese United Church
- Parkdale United Church: major addition, 1949 by Cecil Burgess
- Queenswood United Church
- Rideau Park United Church
- Riverside United Church
- Rothwell United Church by James Strutt (1960-1962)
- Église Unie St-Marc
- St. Andrew's United Church (Cumberland)
- St. Andrew's United Church (Fitzroy Harbour)
- St. James United Church
- St. Paul's-Eastern United Church
- St. Paul's United Church (Carp)
- St. Paul's United Church (Richmond)
- Stittsville United Church
- South Gloucester United Church
- Southminster United Church
- Trinity United Church (Kars)
- Trinity United Church (Ottawa), R.A.I.C. Millennium Church by James Strutt (1960–65)
- Wesley United Church
- Westboro United Church
- Woodroffe United Church

=== Wesleyan ===
- Sunnyside Wesleyan Church
- Highland Park Wesleyan Church
- Kanata Wesleyan Church (a.k.a. "The Bridge")
- Ottawa Mandarin Wesleyan Church
- Crossway Christian Church, Victoria

== Religious Society of Friends (Quakers) ==
- Ottawa Friends Meeting

== Unitarian Universalist ==
- First Unitarian Congregation of Ottawa
- Unitarian Universalist Fellowship of Ottawa

== See also ==
- List of Ottawa synagogues
- List of Ottawa mosques
- City of Ottawa
