= List of synagogues in Ottawa =

This is a list of current synagogues in Ottawa, Ontario, Canada:

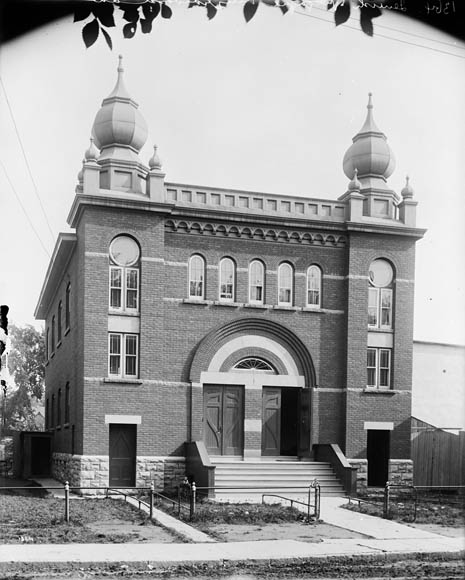
Adath Jeshurun Synagogue on King Edward Ave pre-1930

== Current synagogues ==
=== Reform ===
- Temple Israel

=== Reconstructionist ===
- Or Haneshamah

=== Conservative ===
- Adath Shalom
- Kehillat Beth Israel

=== Modern Orthodox ===
- Beit Tikvah of Ottawa
- Glebe Shul
- Machzikei Hadas

=== Orthodox ===
- Orthodox Community Ohev Yisroel
- Young Israel of Ottawa

=== Chabad ===
- Congregation Lubavitch
- Ottawa Torah Center Chabad
- Chabad of Centrepointe
- Chabad of Kanata

== Former synagogues ==
=== Conservative ===
- Agudath Israel, merged with Congregation Beth Shalom and became Kehillat Beth Israel
- Congregation Beth Shalom, originally Orthodox and later Conservative, merged with Agudath Israel and became Kehillat Beth Israel. Beth Shalom is the result of the amalgamation of Adath Jeshurun, Agudath Achim and later B'nai Jacob Congregation.

=== Orthodox ===
- Adath Jeshurun, founded in 1904 on King Edward Avenue, designed by John William Hurrell Watts. The building still exists, but is now the Ottawa French Seventh-day Adventist Church
- Agudath Achim, founded in 1912 on Rideau Street, designed by Cecil Burgess
- B'nai Jacob Congregation, founded in 1910, in what is today Centretown

== See also ==
- List of Ottawa churches
- List of Ottawa mosques
- List of religious buildings in Ottawa
