= List of buildings in Ottawa =

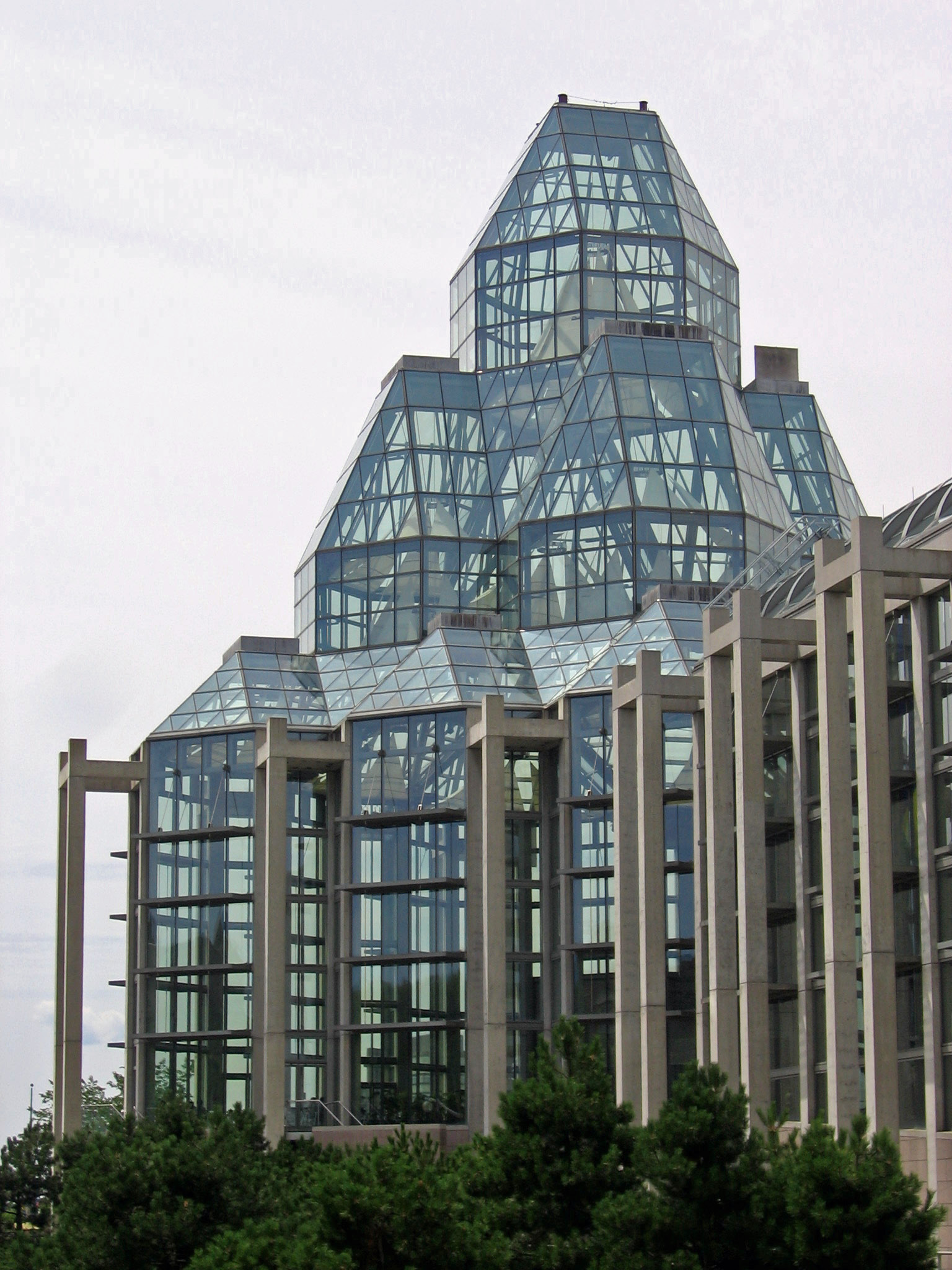
The glass façade of Canada's National Gallery.

This is a list of notable buildings in Ottawa, Ontario, Canada.

== Museums ==
- Portrait Gallery of Canada
- National Gallery of Canada
- Canadian Museum of History (in Gatineau)
- Canadian War Museum
- Victoria Memorial Museum Building, housing the Canadian Museum of Nature
- Canada Science and Technology Museum
- Laurier House
- Bytown Museum

== Government buildings ==
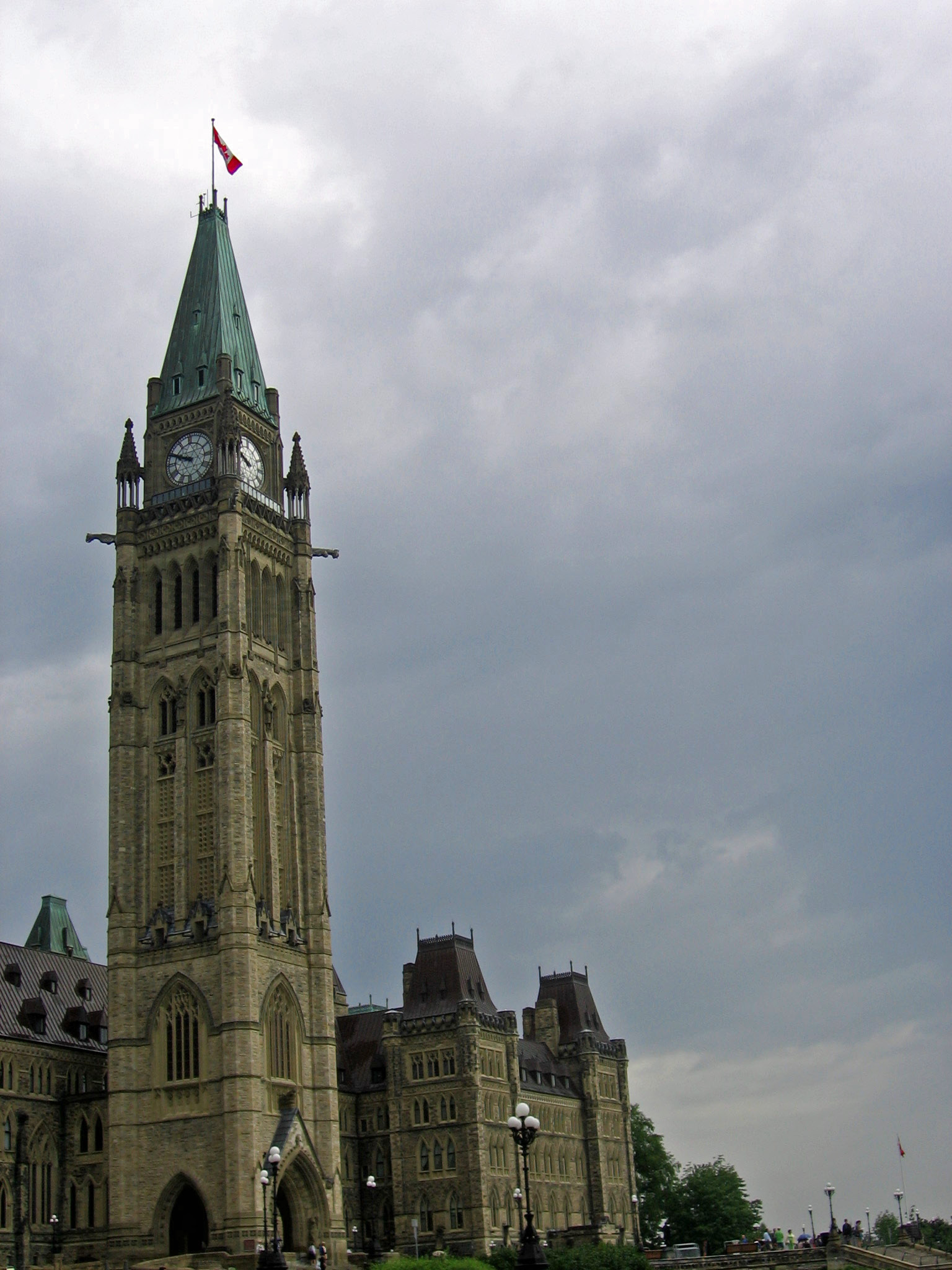
The Peace Tower is the centrepiece of the Parliament of Canada as shown here.

- Parliament of Canada
  - Peace Tower
  - Library of Parliament
- Ottawa City Hall
- Ottawa Courthouse
- Supreme Court of Canada
- National Library and Archives of Canada
- Langevin Block
- Cartier Square Drill Hall
- East and West Memorial Buildings
- Bank of Canada building
- Confederation Building (Ottawa)
- Major-General George R. Pearkes Building, sometimes referred to as "National Defence Headquarters"
- Government Conference Centre
- Sir Leonard Tilley Building
- Ottawa Convention Centre formerly Ottawa Congress Centre

== Official residences ==
- Rideau Hall
- 24 Sussex Drive
- Stornoway
- 7 Rideau Gate

== Embassies and high commissions ==
See: List of embassies and high commissions in Ottawa

- Algerian (Fleck/Paterson House)
- American
- British
- Brunei Darussalam (Stadcona Hall)
- P. R. Chinese
- Croatian (Toller House)
- French
- German
- Iraqi (Panet House)
- Russian

== Office towers ==
- Lester B. Pearson Building
- L'Esplanade Laurier
- Place de Ville
- Place Bell
- World Exchange Plaza
- C. D. Howe Building
- Thomas D'Arcy McGee Building
- R. H. Coats Building
- CBC Ottawa Production Centre
- Heritage Place
- Place du Portage (in Gatineau)
- Terrasses de la Chaudière (in Gatineau) - the tallest building in the National Capital Region
- Constitution Square
- John G. Diefenbaker Building

== Schools ==
- Lisgar Collegiate Institute
- Glebe Collegiate Institute
- Ashbury College
- Elmwood School
- Immaculata High School
- Hawthorne Public School
- Algonquin College
- Earl of March secondary school

== Religious buildings ==
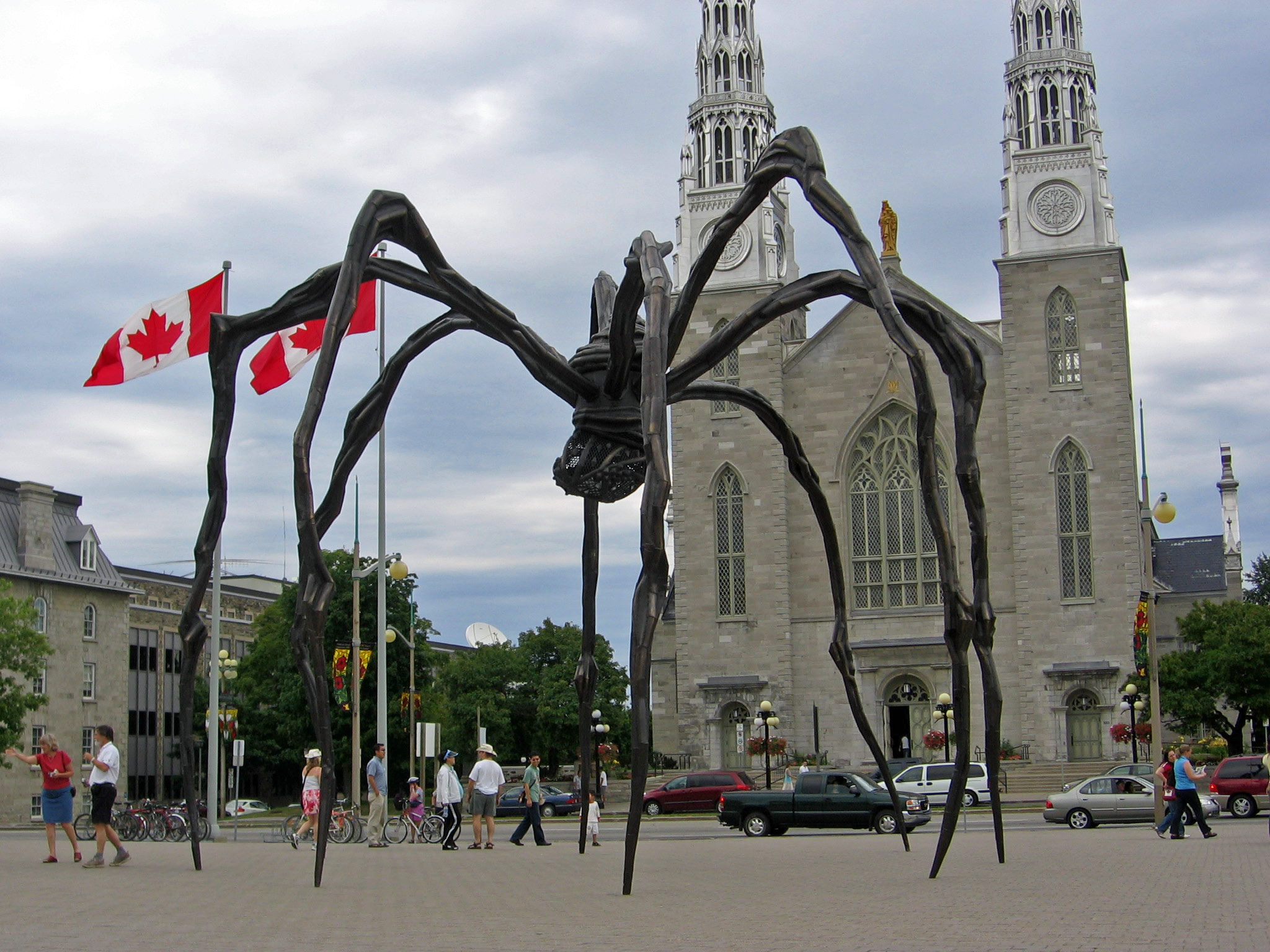
Ottawa's Notre-Dame Cathedral as seen through Louise Bourgeois's Maman sculpture at the National Gallery.

- Christ Church Cathedral
- Dominion-Chalmers United Church
- Notre-Dame Cathedral

See also: List of religious buildings in Ottawa, List of Ottawa churches, List of Ottawa synagogues, List of Ottawa mosques

== Other ==
- Château Laurier
- Lord Elgin Hotel
- Britannia Yacht Club
- Bayshore Shopping Centre
- Canadian Tire Centre (formerly Scotiabank Place)
- Goodwin House
- Ben Franklin Place
- Lansdowne Park
- National Arts Centre
- Former Ogilvy's Department Store
- The Ottawa Hospital
- Ottawa Macdonald–Cartier International Airport
- Ottawa Public Library Main Branch
- Ottawa Train Station
- Ottawa Curling Club
- Ottawa Baseball Stadium
- Rideau Centre
- Royal Canadian Mint
- St. Laurent Shopping Centre

== Significant demolished buildings ==
- Capitol Cinema
- Daly Building
- Dey's Arena
- Former city halls:
  - First city hall
  - Second city hall
- Russell Hotel
- Ottawa Auditorium
- Ottawa Congress Centre
- Lorne Building

== Map of major buildings ==
A map of downtown Ottawa, including parts of Lower Town, Sandy Hill, and downtown Hull.
Click on the stars to read articles on individual buildings.

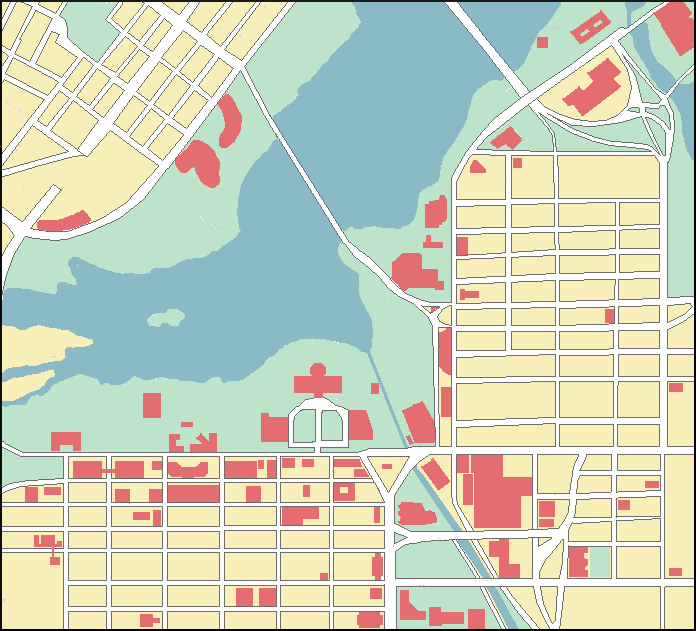

== See also ==
- Architecture of Ottawa
- List of buildings
- List of designated heritage properties in Ottawa
- List of Ottawa roads
- List of tallest buildings in Ottawa-Gatineau
- List of National Historic Sites of Canada in Ottawa
- List of shopping malls in Ottawa
