= Ottawa cathedral =

Ottawa cathedral may refer to:

- Christ Church Cathedral (Ottawa), Anglican
- St. Elias Antiochian Orthodox Cathedral, Antiochian Orthodox
- Notre-Dame Cathedral Basilica, Ottawa, Roman Catholic

== See also ==
- List of churches in Ottawa
