= List of religious buildings in Ottawa =

This is a list of religious buildings in Ottawa, the capital city of Canada.

== Buddhism ==
- Joyful Land Buddhist Centre
- Tu-An Pagoda
- White Wind Zen Community

== Christianity ==
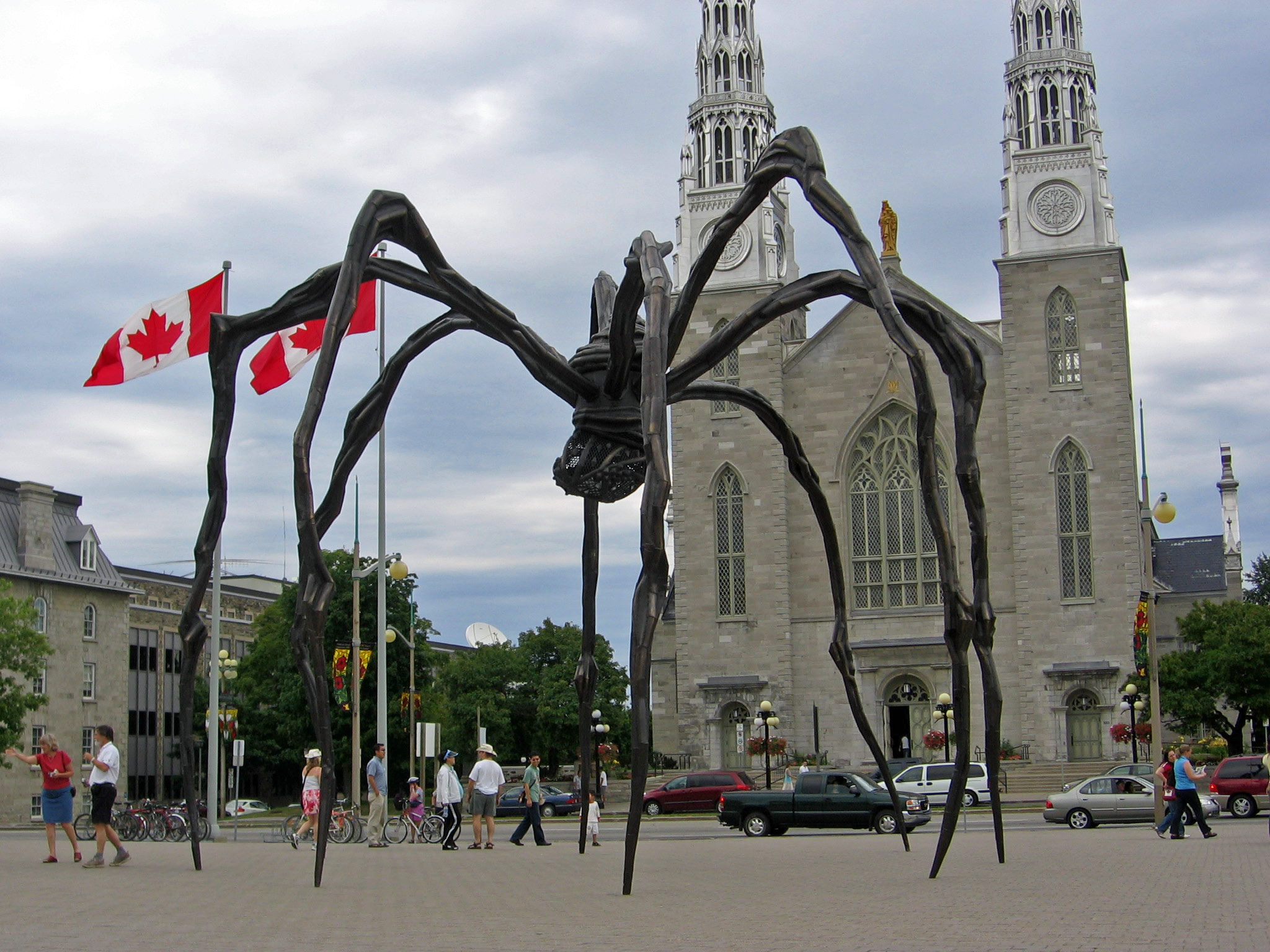
Ottawa's Notre-Dame Cathedral as seen through Louise Bourgeois's Maman sculpture at the National Gallery.

- Blessed Sacrament Catholic Church
- Christ Church Cathedral
- Dominion-Chalmers United Church
- Notre-Dame Cathedral Basilica
- Ste-Anne Catholic Church
- St. Anthony of Padua
- St. George's Church
- St. Joseph
- St. Patrick's Basilica
- St. Theresa's Catholic Church
- Peace Tower Church, Pentecostal Church
- St. Charbel Maronite Catholic Parish

== Judaism ==
- Temple Israel (Ottawa) (Reform)
- Or Haneshamah (Reconstructionist)
- Adath Shalom (Ottawa) (Conservative)
- Machzikei Hadas, (Modern Orthodox Judaism)
- Beit Tikvah of Ottawa (Modern Orthodox Judaism)
- Young Israel of Ottawa, (Orthodox)

== Hinduism ==
- Hindu Temple of Ottawa-Carleton
- Vishva Shakti Durga Mandir

== Islam ==
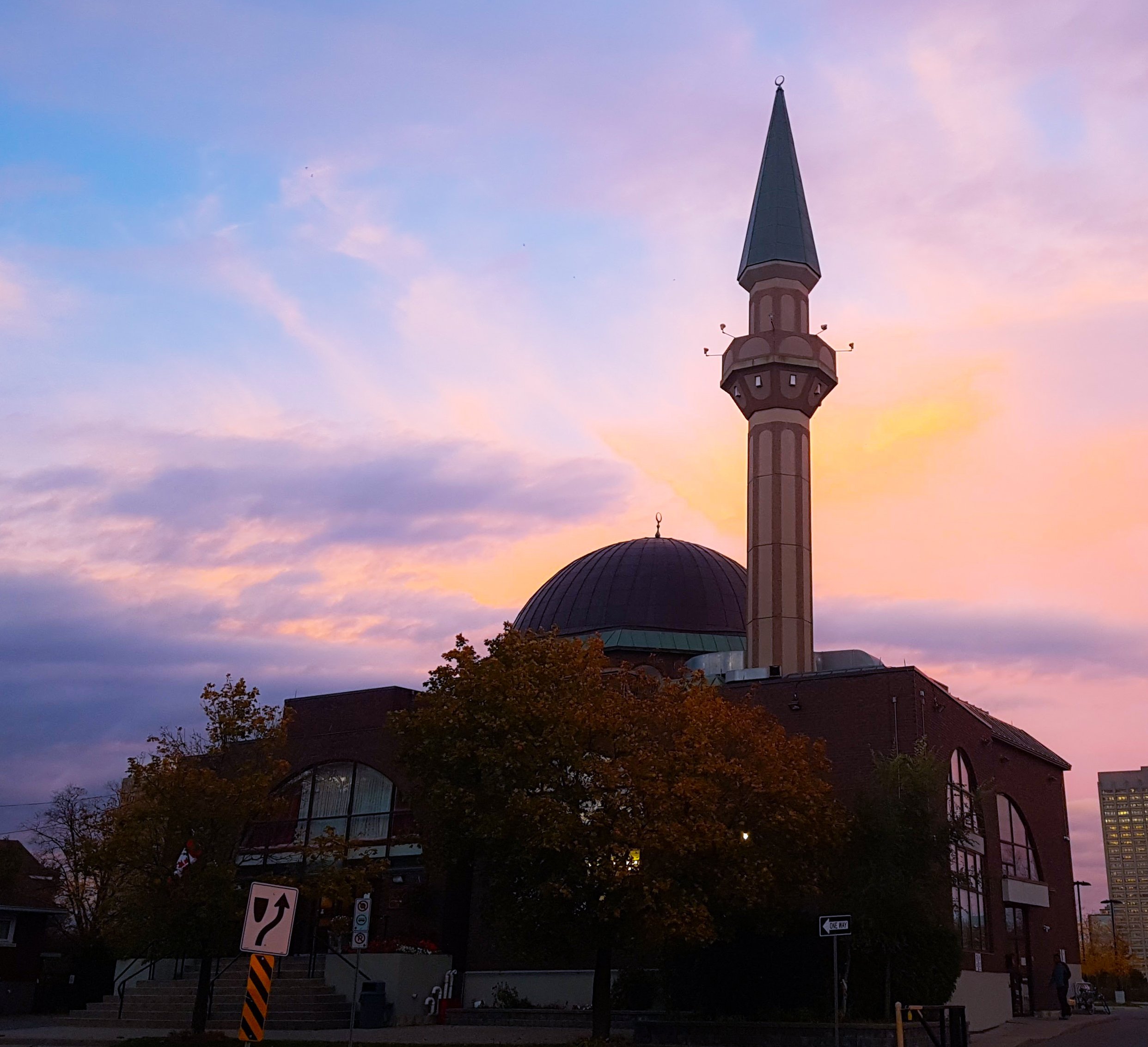
The Ottawa Mosque in Westboro.

- Rhoda Institute for Islamic Spiritual Learning
- Ottawa Mosque
- Abo Ther Mosque
- Al-Batool Fatima Association
- Ahlul-Bayt Centre
- Ahmadiyya Muslim Mosque
- Ahmadiyya Muslim Mosque Kanata
- Assalam Mosque (Ottawa)
- Ottawa Ismaili Mosque
- Bilal Masjid
- Bells Corners Jami Omar
- Islamic Shia Ithna-asheri Association
- South Nepean Muslim Community

== Sikhism ==
- Ottawa Sikh Society

== See also ==
- List of buildings in Ottawa
