= Adath Shalom (Ottawa) =

Religious group in Ottawa, Canada

- Hebrew: קהילת עדת שלום
- Location in Ottawa

Religion
- Affiliation: Conservative Judaism
- Ecclesiastical or organisational status: Synagogue
- Status: Active

Location
- Location: 31 Nadolny Sachs Private, Ottawa, Ontario K2A 1R9
- Administration: United Synagogue of Conservative Judaism
- Coordinates: 45.3751°N 75.7525°W

Architecture
- Established: 1978

Website
- www.adath-shalom.ca

Adath Shalom, officially Adath Shalom Congregation of Ottawa (Hebrew: שלום עדת קהילת), is a Conservative synagogue located in Ottawa, Ontario, Canada. It has been egalitarian and lay-led since 1978. It is affiliated with the United Synagogue of Conservative Judaism. All Adath Shalom members - men, women and teenagers - lead the services as well as weekly discussion of the Torah portion.

== Programming ==
Shabbat services are held each Saturday at the Jewish Community Campus on 31 Nadolny Sachs Private at 9:45 AM. Although there is no regular rabbi, visiting clergy to lead the services for the shabbatons and for the High Holy Days services. Programs include: adult educational programs; special family programs at Sukkoth, Simchat Torah, Chanukah and Purim; adult social events; children's programming; and instructional programs to teach members how to lead services.

== History ==
The Jewish population of Ottawa grew from 20 families in 1889 to approximately 5,500 in 1961. Adath Shalom (Ottawa) was founded in 1977 as an egalitarian Conservative synagogue by Rabbi Roy Tannenbaum who sought to establish a new congregation with more female participation. Adath Shalom was officially affiliated with the United Synagogue of Conservative Judaism in 1979. In 1979, it became a member of the Ottawa Vaad Ha'ir (Community Council). 93 individuals signed up as founding members by July 22, 1978. New members were found through a combination of word-of-mouth to those affiliated with other synagogues and advertising for unaffiliated Jews and newcomers to Ottawa in the Ottawa Jewish Bulletin. On August 3, 1978, Adath Shalom had a general meeting and held its first election.

== Jewish Memorial Gardens ==
As of July 1, 2008, each of the founding members: Congregation Machzikei Hadas; Congregation Beth Shalom; Agudath Israel, in Ottawa; the Jewish Reform Congregation of Ottawa – Temple Israel (Ottawa); Young Israel of Ottawa; and Congregation Beit Tikvah of Ottawa transferred to Jewish Memorial Gardens the cemetery lands that they had.
