= History of the Jews in Ottawa =

The Jewish community in Ottawa grew rapidly between the 1850s and the early 20th century, settling mainly in the Lower Town area. According to the census, the Jewish population went from a mere 4 people in 1861 to 398 by 1901, and then grew to 1,776 by 1911, continuing to rise. Jewish traders became predominant in the ByWard Market. Various organizations were formed within the community to help newer immigrants.

== History ==
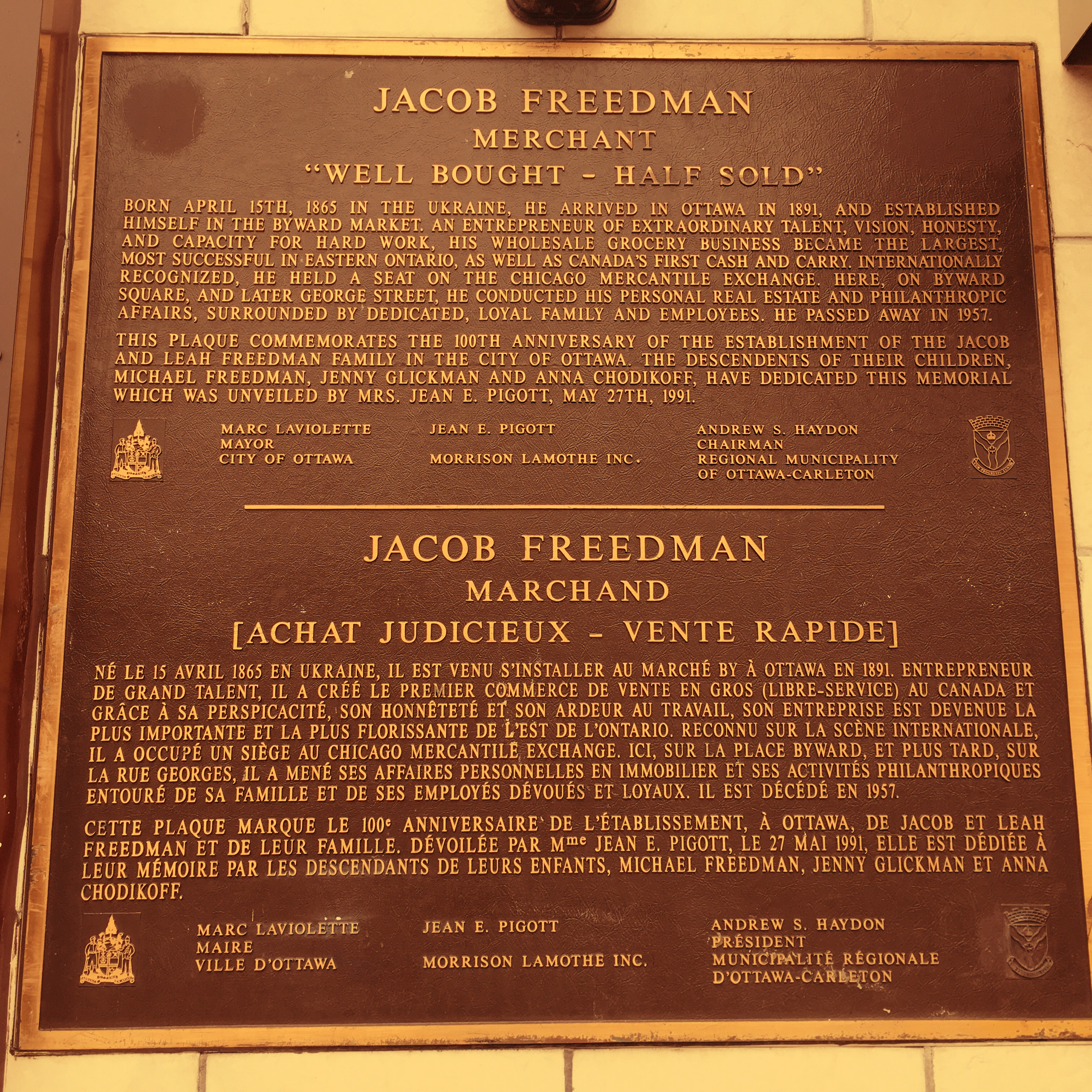
Jacob Freedman (b. Zhitomir (Ukraine) arrived in Ottawa "between Purim and Pesach in the year 1891

=== Immigration and Ottawa’s Jewish pioneers ===
Jewish immigration to Canada heavily increased between 1850 and 1939 with the rise of anti-Semitism and pogroms in Eastern Europe. The first Jewish immigrants who settled in Ottawa arrived between 1857 and 1889. "The Jewish population of Ottawa doubled its size approximately five times between 1901 and 1911". Although it is difficult to identify the first Jewish immigrant to Ottawa, some of the earliest were:

==== Moses Bilsky ====
Moses Bilsky was originally from Lithuania. He established his home in Lowertown in 1867 and opened a jewellery and pawn shop on Rideau Street. Bilsky was also a philanthropist and founder of Ottawa's first synagogue, Adath Jeshuran.

==== Aaron Rosenthal ====
Rosenthal was an immigrant from Germany first to Australia where he met his wife, Bertha. Rosenthal began a retail jewellery business in Ottawa on Sparks Street called A. Rosenthal & Sons. and was also a philanthropist.

==== Bertha Rosenthal (née Lehman) ====
Rosenthal, like her husband, was born in Germany and became a philanthropist. She was a volunteer for many women's organizations as well as a founder and president of the Ottawa Ladies Hebrew Benevolent.

==== Franklin Burkholder ====
Franklin Dean Burkholder was the great-great-grandson of a Mennonite immigrant from Pennsylvania; his Great-Great-Grandfather having come from Germany to Pennsylvania about 1754. Franklin worked as a furrier and tailor in Ottawa. He was president of F.D. Burkholder Ltd., Furriers and Ladies’ Tailors, located at 119 Bank Street".

=== The Jewish neighbourhood ===
The Jewish community may have only been approximately 1.92% of Ottawa's population in the 1920s-1940s, but Lowertown consisted of 70% of the city's Jewish population.

Ottawa's cheap peddling licence and the advantage to observe Shabbat meant peddling became a common occupation for the new immigrants and community. If successful at this demanding career, a peddler would buy a horse and cart or set up a store - likely in the ByWard Market.

The ByWard Market was dominated by Jewish merchants between WWI and WWII. The ByWard Market Street had many Jewish produce businesses. Day merchants rented sidewalk space in the market also on ByWard Market Street. Clothing was located on William Street, the Kosher butchers were located on the west and east sides of the market, dairy on the west side, and The Rideau Bakery was located on the corner of Rideau and Nelson Streets.

== The community today ==
As of 2011, there are approximately 14,010 Jews living in Ottawa with numerous community organizations and businesses, a Jewish Community Centre, a number of Jewish preschools and day schools, 8 synagogues and 5 Chabad centres.

The majority of the Ottawa Jewish community reside in Centrepointe and Craig Henry, followed closely by Centretown and The Glebe, and the areas of Westboro, Glabar Park and Whitehaven. The Jewish population is dispersed around the city, with smaller communities in Alta Vista and Barrhaven. There is additionally a growing community of Jews from the Former Soviet Union and Israel.

== See also ==
- Jewish schools in Ottawa
- Synagogues in Ottawa

== Sources ==
- Bilsky, Anna (2009). A Common Thread: A History of the Jews of Ottawa. Renfrew: General Store Publishing House. ISBN 978-1-897508-46-6.
