= Trinity Anglican Church (Ottawa) =

Coordinates: 45.390714°N 75.674246°W

Trinity Ottawa
- Trinity Anglican Church (Ottawa)
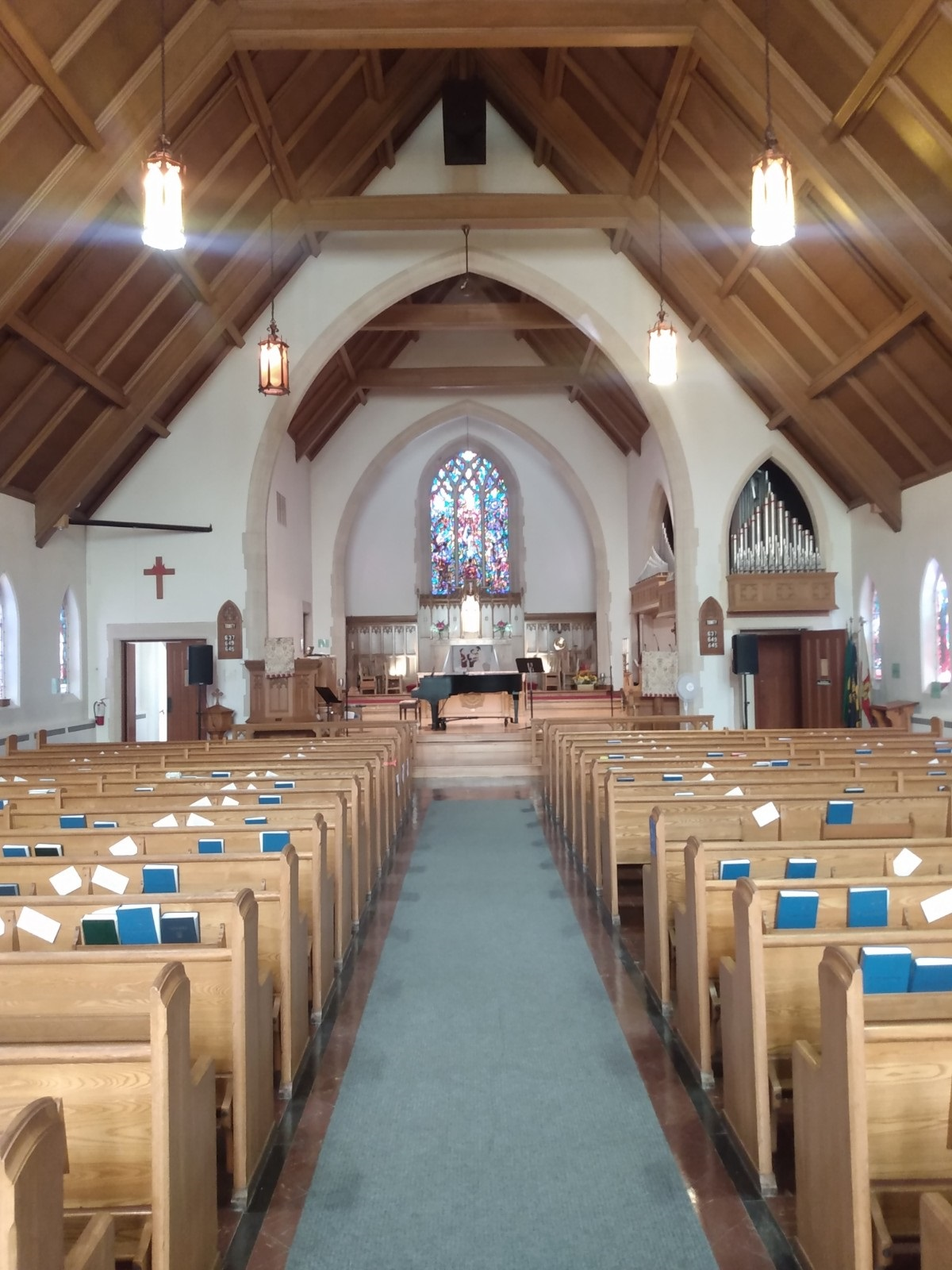
- Sanctuary
- Trinity Ottawa
- Location: 1230 Bank Street; Ottawa, Ontario, Canada
- Denomination: Anglican Church of Canada
- Churchmanship: Broad church
- Website: www.trinityottawa.ca

History
- Dedication: Holy Trinity

Administration
- Province: Ontario
- Diocese: Ottawa

Clergy
- Priest: Mark Whittall

Trinity Anglican Church is an Anglican church in central Ottawa, Ontario, Canada.

As of September 2024, the incumbent is Mark Whittall.

== History ==
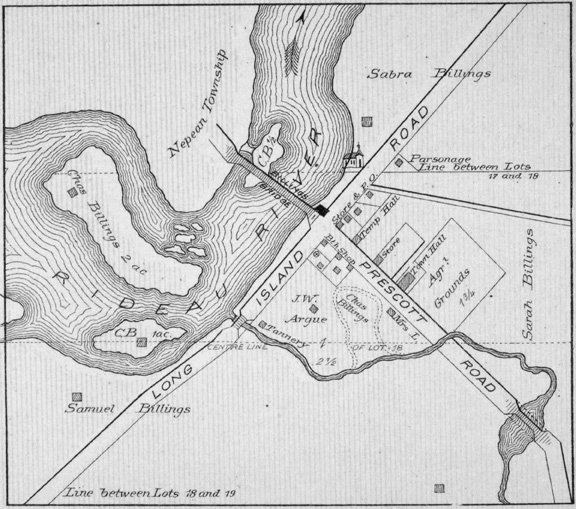
Map of Billings Bridge c.1879

=== Establishment ===
In January 1876, John Lewis, the Bishop of Ontario, asked T. W. Barry to call a special meeting of an ad hoc vestry. Henry O. Wood, John J. Smyth, W. J. Parry, and T. Garrett met in the Billings Bridge Temperance Hall, on the south bank of the Rideau River, just south of Ottawa, and moved to establish a new Church of England mission on the north bank of the river, to be called Trinity Church Mission. William Fleming held the first services of Trinity Church Mission at the Temperance Hall while the new church was being built.

Trinity was the third Anglican parish established in central Ottawa after St. Alban's 1865, and St. Bartholomew's 1867.

On 24 August 1879, H. B. Patton conducted the first service in a new log building. He served Trinity for three years.

=== 20th century ===
A Ladies' Guild was formed on May 16, 1916.

Robert Turley served at Trinity from 1923 to 1944; he was the longest-serving incumbent at the church.

A new Trinity Church was opened on Easter Day (4 April) 1926 with Bishop John Charles Roper as celebrant. The original log building was dismantled and reassembled as the Church of St. Thomas the Apostle on Churchill Avenue in the village of Sawmill Creek (now Alta Vista Drive). The original Trinity cornerstone was reversed and re-laid at St. Thomas by the Bishop on July 31, 1928, with a new inscription, "St. Thomas 1927" facing outwards.

On Ash Wednesday (19 March) 1947, a fire devastated Trinity. The rebuilt church was opened on 29 September 1948.

A new auditorium was opened on 6 May 1958; it was named Turley Hall after Robert Turley.

=== 21st century ===
Members of the church volunteer to serve Cornerstone, the Well, and the Centretown Churches Social Action Committee. Church members also founded and operate the Ottawa South Committee for Refugee Sponsorship.

The church runs an Intentional Christian Community for young people. It is based at the house beside the church building.

== Notable people ==
Wilfred H. Bradley became incumbent at Trinity in 1950, serving for 17 years. Bradley went on to become the first Archivist of the Diocese of Ottawa.

== Bibliography ==
- Morgan, Adelaide B; Gladish, Herbert E. (1999). Reflections on the Past and Present of Trinity Anglican Church. Ottawa, Ontario: Trinity Anglican Church.
