= Hawthorne United Church (Ottawa) =

- Hawthorne United Church 1925-current
- Hawthorne United Church (Ottawa)
- Location: 2244 Russell Road; Ottawa, Ontario; K1G 4B3
- Denomination: United Church of Canada
- Previous denomination: Methodist,
- Churchmanship: Protestant
- Website: HawthorneUnitedChurch.com

History
- Former name: Hawthorne Methodist Church 1892–1925
- Status: Active
- Dedicated: Sunday Nov 14, 1952

Architecture
- Functional status: Active
- Architectural type: Modern
- Style: church hall in the 1950s

Specifications
- Materials: Brick, Bituminous Built-up roof, concrete and wood

Administration
- District: Ottawa East
- Parish: Hawthorne

Hawthorne United Church is a United Church of Canada congregation in Ottawa, Ontario, Canada. One of Ottawa's older congregations, the church formed in 1892. It joined the United Church when it was formed in 1925. In 1925, Hawthorne became officially Hawthorne United Church. The Hawthorne United Church has operated out of 2244 Russell Road location since 1952. As a pastoral charge of the United Church of Canada, the church is celebrating its 122nd anniversary in 2014.

== Mission ==
Hawthorne United Church is a place of worship, offering social outreach and religious fellowship.

== Programs ==
The purpose of Hawthorne United Church is to promote religion and attempt to relieve the effects of poverty and distress in western Ottawa and neighbouring communities. The congregation conducts a weekly worship service, including special activities for children (e.g. worship-related crafts, stories and music). It also provides support and counselling in crisis and emergency (e.g., sickness, poverty, death, distress), chaplaincy functions, pastoral care, religious education, worship, family counselling and community outreach. The congregation donates funds to denomination headquarters in support of national and international Mission and Service activities and donates funds to a local community chaplaincy association, which provides outreach services direct to area residents. In addition, the congregation provides support directly to local food banks. Hawthorne United Church conducts regular discussion groups and seminars focusing on religious education and exploration.

== Facilities ==
The Hawthorne United Church meetings rooms used for workshops, club meetings, conferences, receptions, dinners, and weddings are fully accessible. The Church office hours are Monday, Tuesday and Thursday, Friday from 9 to noon, year-round. The Church offers free parking.

== History ==
The Hawthorne United Church was originally built in 1892 on land expropriated by the Federal District Commission as part of the relocation of Ottawa's railway tracks. Hawthorne United was moved to make way for a bridge on Nov 22 1950 to a site a mile west, near the CBO transmitter. The original cornerstone, laid on June 24, 1892, was brought up to date to reflect the new brick church, dedicated Sunday Nov 14, 1952.

In 2003, the United Church and Anglican Church began to engage in a formal conversation on organically uniting the two churches Anglican and United churches in Canada.

Some activities at Hawthorne United Church over the years have been:

- Social Action Committee
- Bible Study Groups
- Paying off the mortgage

The Eastern Ontario Outaouais Regional Council Executive approved the request of the Council of Hawthorne United Church to disband, pending the receipt of a distribution plan prior to June 30, the Hawthorne United Church pastoral charge effective June 30, 2021.

=== Records ===
Records of the Ontario congregations of the Ottawa Presbytery are housed at the City of Ottawa Archives in Ottawa, Ontario. The Hawthorne United Church's Marriage Registers (1925–1985), Baptism Registers (1925–1973) and Burial Registers (1926–1990) have been deposited in the Montreal & Ottawa Conference collection under Ottawa Presbytery Ontario Congregation Archives.

== Ministers ==
- Rev. J. J. Brownlee, 1926 to 1937;
- Rev. H. D. Whitmore, 1937 to 1941;
- Rev John Maskakill 1952 (also a pastor at Ramsayville)

== Other readings ==
- Don Schweitzer, ed. "The United Church of Canada: A History." Wilfrid Laurier University Press, 2012. ISBN 978-1-55458-331-7, electronic format ISBN 978-1-55458-376-8 and ISBN 978-1-55458-419-2
