= Native trees in Ottawa =

Native trees in Ottawa are trees that are naturally growing in Ottawa, Ontario and were not later introduced by humans. Many of Ottawa's native trees have been displaced by non-native plants and trees introduced by settlers from Europe and Asia from the 18th century to the present. Most of the native trees are found in the Greenbelt, parks, and along the Rideau and Ottawa rivers.

The types of trees growing across the city vary based on the soil conditions in the area. Tree cover in the city prior to European settlement started from the shore line back. Settlement resulted in trees being cut for use in building homes and ships and for heating by early residents. The city's Urban Forestry Services plants these trees on city property and encourages others in the city to do the same.

A partial list of native trees in Ottawa:

- Ash
  - Black ash
  - Green ash
  - White ash
- Aspen
  - Balsam poplar
  - Large-tooth aspen
  - Trembling aspen
- Basswood
  - American basswood
- Birch
  - White birch
  - Yellow birch
- Beech
  - American beech
- Cedar
  - Eastern Redcedar
  - Eastern White Cedar
- Chestnut
  - American chestnut
- Dogwoods
  - Alternate-leaved dogwood
- Elm
  - American elm
- Hackberry
  - Northern hackberry
- Hawthorns
- Hickory
  - Bitternut hickory
  - Shagbark hickory
- Hemlock
  - Eastern hemlock
- Hop-hornbeam
  - Ironwood
- Hornbeam
  - Blue-beech
- Larch
  - Tamarack
- Maple
  - Red maple
  - Silver maple
  - Striped maple
  - Sugar maple
- Mountain-ash
  - American mountain-ash
- Oak
  - Bur oak
  - Eastern black oak
  - Northern red oak
  - Pin oak
  - Swamp white oak
  - White oak
- Pine
  - Eastern white pine
  - Jack Pine
  - Pitch Pine
  - Red Pine
- Prunus
  - Black cherry
  - Chokecherry
  - Pin cherry
- Serviceberries
- Spruce
  - Black Spruce
  - White Spruce
- Walnut
  - Butternut
  - Black walnut
- Willow
  - Black willow
  - Peachleaf willow

== See also ==
- Ottawa Greenbelt
