= List of museums in Ottawa =

The City of Ottawa and the surrounding National Capital Region have an abundance of museums and galleries. Museums range from large national museum with international notoriety, to small galleries and living museums.

== National Museums ==
Museum	Image	Location	Established	Type	Notes	Ref
Canada Agriculture and Food Museum		Experimental Farm	1983	Agricultural	Canada's preeminent agriculture museum, demonstrating advances in farming science and technology	
Canada Aviation and Space Museum		Rockcliffe Park	1982	Aviation	Canada's national aviation and space museum, with the most extensive aviation collection in Canada	
Canada Science and Technology Museum		St. Laurent	1967	Science	Canada's national science museum, displaying the technological and scientific history of Canada	
Canadian Museum of History		Hull	1856	History	Canada's national history museum, featuring a large collection, study, and preserve of materials that illuminate the human history of Canada	
Canadian Museum of Nature		Centretown	1968	Nature	Canada's national natural history and natural sciences museum	
Canadian War Museum		LeBreton Flats	1942	Military	Canada's national museum of military history	
National Arts Centre		Centretown	1965	Art	Canada's centre for the performing arts	
National Gallery of Canada		Lower Town	1880	Art	Canada's national art museum and one of the largest art museums in North America	

== Other Museums & Galleries ==
Museum	Image	Location	Type	Notes	Ref
Atrium Gallery		Centrepointe	Art	Works of local and regional artists, owned and operated by the City of Ottawa	
Bank of Canada Museum		Centretown	Currency	National Currency Collection	
Billings Estate Museum		Alta Vista	History	Historic house from 1828 home of early settler, costumed guides discuss city and region's history	
Bytown Museum		Centretown	History	City's early history and building of the Rideau Canal	
Cameron Highlanders of Ottawa Museum		Centretown	Military	Regimental history and artefacts, located in Cartier Square Drill Hall	
Canada Council for the Arts		Centretown	Art	A Crown Corporation established in 1957 to act as an arts council of the government	
Canadian Photography Institute		Lower Town	Art	Part of the National Gallery	
Carleton County Gaol		Centretown	Prison	Site of the last state execution in Canada. Jail tours and hostel	
Carleton University Art Gallery		Old South	Art	Gallery at Carleton University	
Centrepointe Theatre Gallery		Centrepointe	Art	Works of local and regional artists, operated by the City of Ottawa	
City of Ottawa Art Galleries		Centretown	Art	Art galleries owned and operated by the City of Ottawa	
Cube Galley		Wellington West	Art	Art Gallery featuring local artists	
Cumberland Heritage Village Museum		Cumberland	Living	1920–1930s rural village	
Diefenbunker Museum		Carp	Military	Cold War bunker for the Canadian government	
Dominion Arboretum		Experimental Farm	Nature	Begun in 1889, the Arboretum covers about 26 hectares (64 acres) of land	
Fairfields Heritage House		Richmond	History	A 19th century Gothic Revival farm house	
Foyer Gallery		Tanglewood	Art	Artist-run gallery for regional art, located in the Nepean Sportsplex	
Gallery 101		Centretown	Art	Artist-run contemporary art centre	
Goulbourn Museum		Stittsville	History	19th and 20th century rural township life	
Governor General's Foot Guards Regimental Museum		Centretown	Military	History of the regiment	
Kanata Civic Art Gallery		Kanata	Art	The gallery exhibits and promotes original works of art	
Karsh-Masson Gallery		Centretown	Art	One of the City Hall art galleries	
L. A. Pai Gallery		Centretown	Art	Sculptural arts and contemporary jewelry	
Laurier House National Historic Site		Centretown	History	Home of two prime ministers	
Lee Matasi Gallery		ByWard Market	Art	An Ottawa School of Art Gallery	
Library and Archives Canada		Centretown	History	Exhibits from its collections	
Mackenzie King Estate		Kingsmere	History	Interactive exhibits and guided tours of faithfully restored artifacts, are open to visitors	
Museum of Classical Antiquities		Sandy Hill	History	Museum at Department of Classics and Religious Studies of the University of Ottawa	
Nepean Fine Arts League Gallery		Nepean	Art	Artist-run gallery	
Nepean Museum		City View	History	Makes accessible and communicates the former municipality of Nepean's history	
Osgoode Township Museum		Vernon	History	Archival material and artifacts reflect the history of the Township of Osgoode	
Orange Art Gallery		Centretown West	Art	Contemporary art	
Ottawa Art Gallery		Centretown	Art	Contemporary and 20th-century art	
Ottawa Jewish Archives		Highland Park	History	A collective memory of the Jewish community of Ottawa and National Capital Region	
Ottawa Room		Centretown	History	Ottawa’s written heritage for researchers and for residents with a passion for local history	
Ottawa School of Art Galleries		ByWard Market	Art	A wide variety of contemporary art as well as openings, artist talks, and events	
Ottawa Sport Hall of Fame		Kanata	Sports	Located in the Canadian Tire Centre	
Parliament of Canada		Centretown	History	Tours, displays, exhibits	
Pinhey's Point Historic Site		Dunrobin	History	19th century estate home, park, and living museum	
Rideau Hall		Rockcliffe Park	History	Tours of the official residence of the Governor General of Canada	
Royal Canadian Mint		Lower Town	Currency	Interactive guided tours of the Mint's headquarters, founded in 1908	
SAW Gallery		Centretown	Art	Artist-run gallery	
Shenkman Arts Centre		Orleans	Art	Works of local and regional artists, the Dust Evans Gallery of the Gloucester Pottery School, and the Ottawa School of Art Orléans Campus Gallery	
Swords and Ploughshares Museum		Kars	Military	Focus is the Citizen Soldier (the Militiaman and Reservist) at peace and at war, features many military trucks and vehicles	
Symmes National Historic Site of Canada		Aylmer	History	The Symmes Inn Museum is a catalyst for promoting local and regional history	
Vanier Museopark		Vanier	History	History of Vanier and the Francophone heritage of Ottawa	
Watson's Mill		Manotick	History	19th century flour grist mill	
Workers' History Museum		Centretown	History	Workers’ history and heritage, in the National Capital Region and Ottawa Valley	

== Defunct Museums ==
Museum	Image	Location	Type	Notes	Ref
Canada and the World Pavilion		Rockcliffe Park	Geography	National Film Board of Canada's exhibition space	
Canadian Museum of Contemporary Photography		ByWard Market	Art	Closed in 2009	
Canadian Postal Museum		Centretown	Postal	Dissolved in 2012	
Canadian Ski Museum		Centretown	Sport	Moved to Mont. Tremblant	
Wheelhouse Maritime Museum		Centretown	Transportation	Historical maritime museum	

== See also ==
- National museums of Canada
- List of museums in Ontario
