= First United Church (Ottawa) =

Coordinates: 45.412084°N 75.696219°W

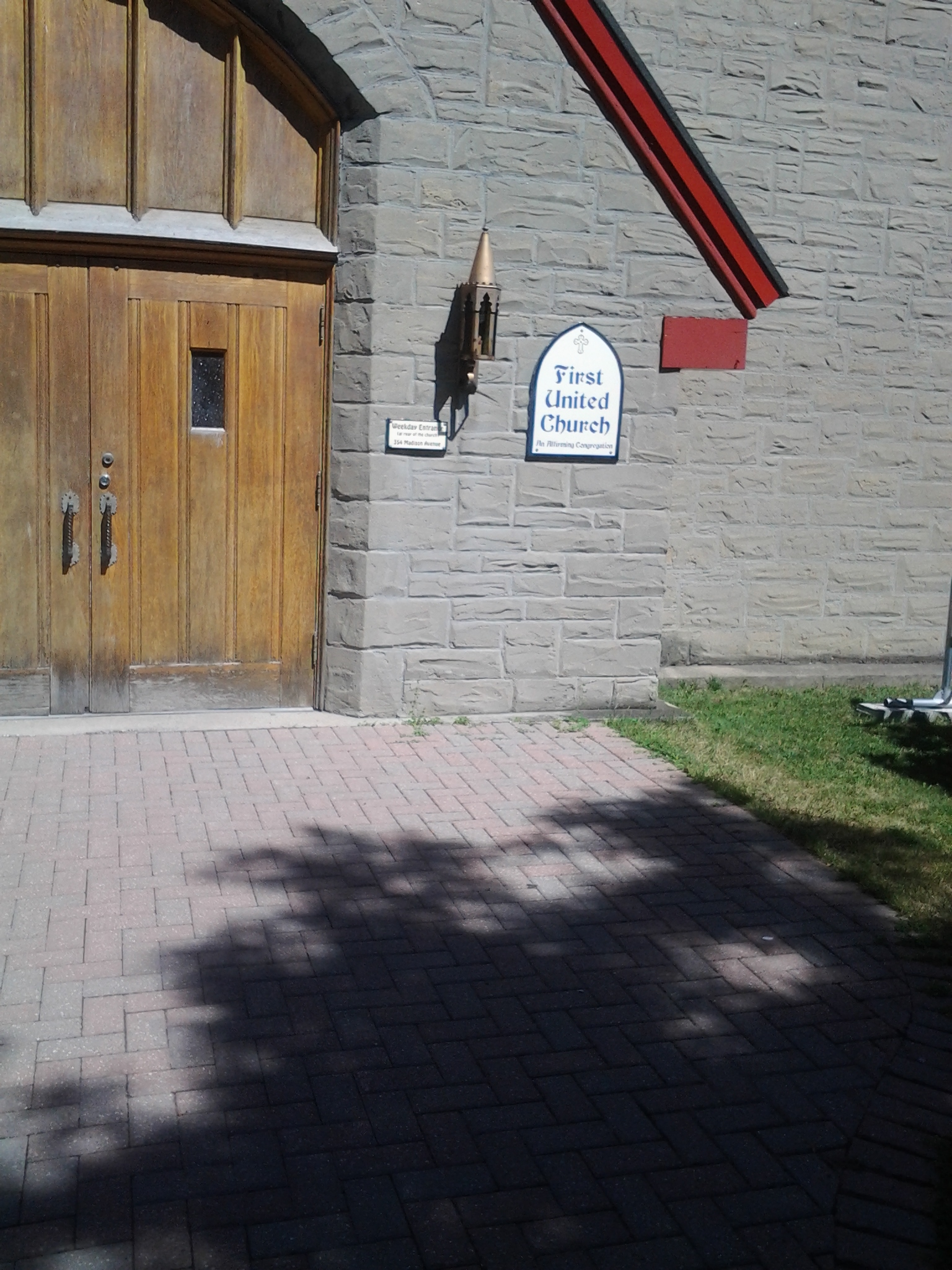
- First United Church (Ottawa) in Westboro
- First United Church (Ottawa)
- Location: Ottawa, Ontario
- Country: Canada
- Denomination: United Church of Canada
- Previous denomination: Congregationalist,
- Website: http://www.firstunitedchurchottawa.org

History
- Status: Cathedral

Architecture
- Functional status: Active
- Architect: Thomas Fuller
- Architectural type: Norman-Gothic
- Style: Gothic Revival

First United Church is a United Church of Canada congregation in Ottawa, Ontario, Canada. One of Ottawa's oldest congregations, the church formed in 1846.

== History ==
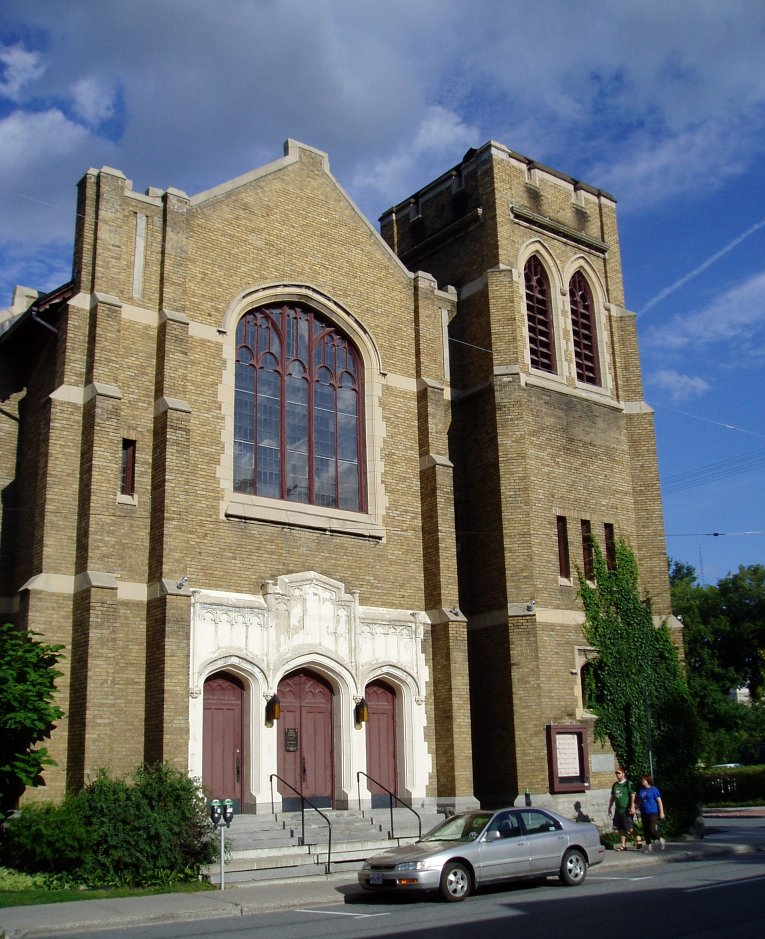
The former home of First United Church at the corner of Kent and Florence

In the middle of the 19th century, that church was the site of the first mixed race marriage in Canada. It was originally Congregationalist, but joined the United Church when it was formed in 1925. The first permanent home was built in 1862 at Elgin and Albert Street. The current building in Centretown was constructed in 1911. In February 1925, it merged with the former Westminster Presbyterian Church (a post-1900 split from Erskine Presbyterian Church), that had voted for Union to become The First United Church of Ottawa, four months before the official Union.

=== Social activism ===
The church began to struggle in the 1970s and 1980s, but in 1987 Rev. Sharon Moon began a seventeen-year tenure at the church, and made it a centre of social activism, especially gay rights, fighting poverty, and supporting people with addictions. As well, its welcome for the diversity of life has drawn many people to the church.

== New church in Westboro ==
In 2007, the congregation sold their historic structure and moved to Westboro, joining with an Anglican Church of Canada congregation, All Saints Westboro (shared building, separate services). The current Minister, the Reverend Brian Cornelius, continues the tradition of First United as one that welcomes diversity. First United has been an 'Affirming Congregation' Affirm United of the United Church of Canada for several years.
