= Saints Peter and Paul Melkite Catholic Church =

Coordinates: 45.421047°N 75.661812°W

Saints Peter and Paul Melkite Catholic Church Ottawa, Ontario
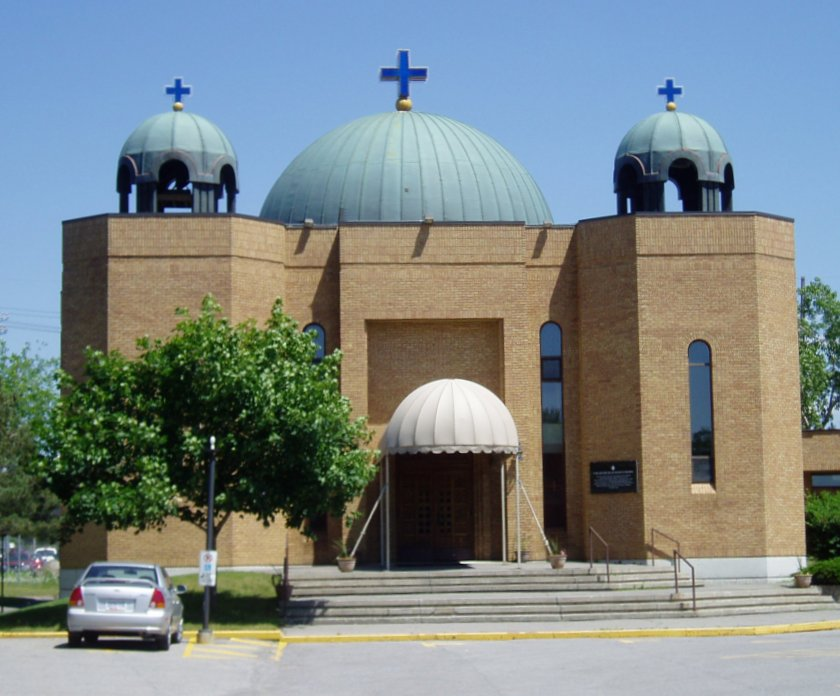
- Saints Peter and Paul Melkite Catholic Church
- Saints Peter and Paul Melkite Catholic Church Ottawa, Ontario
- Denomination: Melkite Greek Catholic Church
- Website: melkite.com

History
- Dedication: St. Peter St. Paul

Administration
- Province: Canada
- Diocese: Diocese of Ontario
- Parish: Ontario

Saints Peter and Paul Melkite Catholic Church is a Melkite Greek Catholic Church in Ottawa, Ontario, Canada. It is located on 1161 North River Road in Overbrook, just to the east of the Rideau River.

== History ==
One of ten Melkite parishes in Canada, the church is largely made up of immigrants from Lebanon, many of whom arrived in the 1970s and 1980s to flee the Lebanese Civil War. Ottawa had a small Melkite Greek Catholic community since the nineteenth century, but they had no church until St. Peter and Paul was founded in 1959. The church first met in the basement of Notre-Dame Cathedral Basilica. In 1961 it purchased the building of Our Lady of the Presentation. In 1979 this building was demolished and the current one was built in its place 1978–1980.

About 500-700 people go to this church. But only about 300-400 people go every week. The average age of the people that go to this church is about 50.

== Plaque ==
This church was built during the term of Archbishop of Ottawa Joseph-Aurèle Plourde and the pastorate of Économos Habib Kwaiter, B.S.O., through donations from the parishioners and benefactors of Saints Peter & Paul Melkite Catholic Church in Ottawa in 1980.
