= Calvin Hungarian Presbyterian Church (Ottawa) =

- Ottawai Kálvin Magyar Református Gyülekezet
- Location of the church in southern Ontario
- 45°21′54″N 75°37′38″W
- Location: 91 Pike Street; Ottawa, Ontario; K1T 3J6
- Denomination: Presbyterian
- Website: calvinhungarian.org

History
- Founded: April 22, 1963
- Dedication: John Calvin

Calvin Hungarian Presbyterian Church (Hungarian: Ottawai Kálvin Magyar Református Gyülekezet) is a Presbyterian Church in the Gloucester suburb of Ottawa, Ontario, Canada and is located at 91 Pike Street. It is named after John Calvin, an influential French theologian and pastor during the Protestant Reformation.

== History ==
Calvin Hungarian Presbyterian Church was dedicated on April 22, 1963 at 414 Laurier Avenue West with 62 members under Rev. K. D. Toth; the members were largely Hungarians who had fled the Hungarian Revolution of 1956. Rev. John A. Johnston, the then Moderator of the Presbyterian Church in Canada, conducted the dedication service, which was attended by Jack Pickersgill, the then Canadian Minister of Citizenship and Immigration, and several other (religious) ministers. The Very Rev. Aladar Ecsedy, dean emeritus of the Presbytery of Budapest, preached in Hungarian.

The congregation subsequently moved to 384 Frank St, Ottawa, and now meets at the location of Gloucester Presbyterian Church.
