= Metropolitan Bible Church =

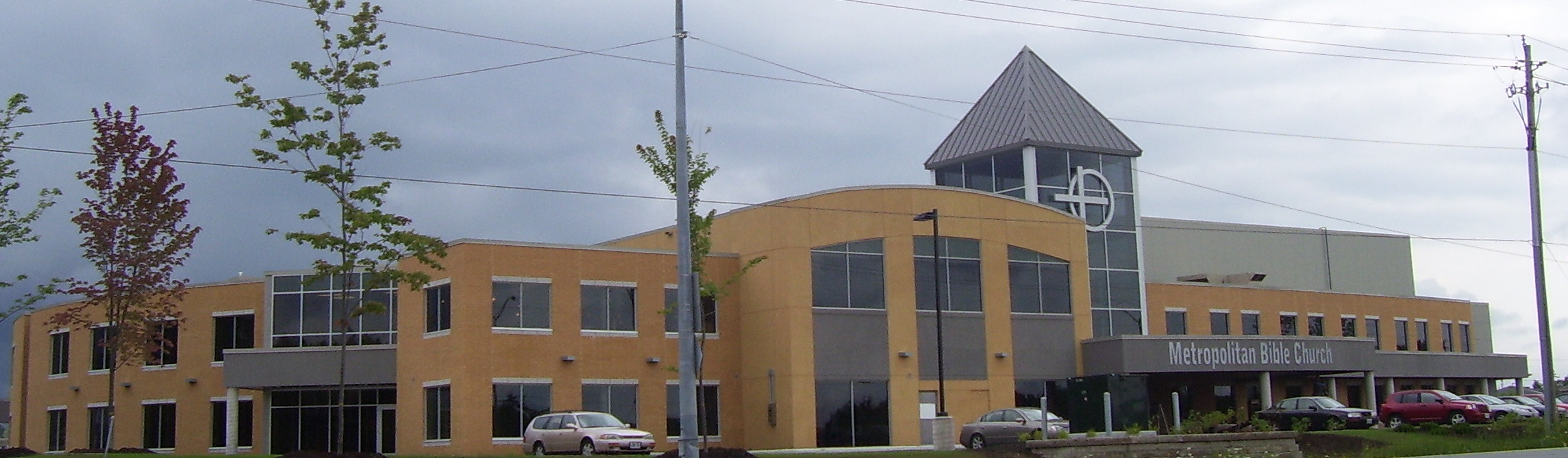
- Building in Nepean
- Metropolitan Bible Church
- 45°19′53″N 75°42′9″W
- Location: Ottawa, Ontario
- Country: Canada
- Denomination: Evangelical
- Website: metbiblechurch.ca

History
- Founded: 1931

Architecture
- Architect(s): Ralph Vandenburgh, Parker Architects
- Construction cost: $16.8 million (CAD)

Specifications
- Capacity: 1,850

The Metropolitan Bible Church is an evangelical Christian megachurch based in the Nepean neighbourhood of Ottawa, Ontario, Canada, affiliated with Associated Gospel Churches of Canada.

== History ==
=== 20th century: inception and growth ===
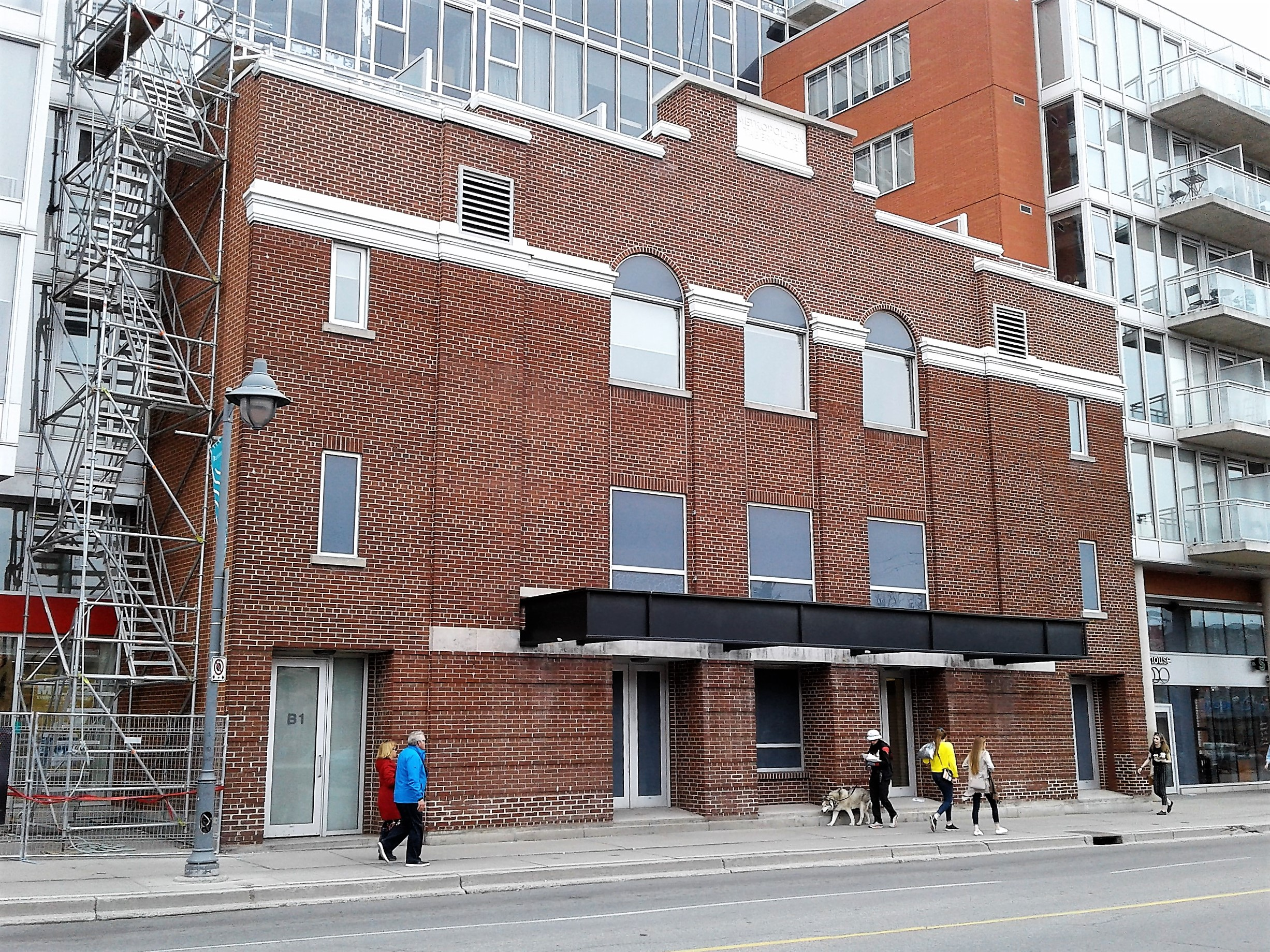
Front of the building on Bank Street

The Metropolitan Bible Church originally started meeting in the Metropolitan Tabernacle in Huckell's Hall in Higgerty's Shoe Store on Bank Street. That meeting turned into a first gathering of 80 people on September 13, 1931, at 453 Bank Street. The Bank Street land was then purchased for $6,500. The church building was built similarly to a movie theatre, so that it could be used as such if the church became unsuccessful. However, the church attendance rapidly grew, to the point that the building needed to expand. For this reason, the adjacent Esso was demolished and relocated to the other side of Bank Street, allowing the church to expand its size. The main and second floors of the new building included adult classes as well as the library, nursery and office rooms. The newly built basement included rooms for child and youth ministry, a gymnasium and a kitchen, as well as an elevator designed exclusively for accessibility purposes. In 1967, the church is renamed "Metropolitan Bible Church".

=== 2000s: new building and relocation ===
By the new millennium, the church building was getting too small to accommodate its guests. For example, the Metropolitan Bible Church held services at Carleton University for additional guests. Additionally, the youth ministry's night services were relocated to nearby churches and/or schools because women were gathering at the Met during the same time. The need for additional space prompted the church to seek a new building that it would build debt-free, at a cost of $13.5 million, by using guests' general and earmarked donations, with 1,550 seats. In June 2007, some volunteers started to help clear the eight-acre piece of land for the new location. The new location was to be at Prince of Wales Drive & West Hunt Club Road. Up until the new church was built, church attendance was of 1,800 guests meeting in various buildings. The last service at the Bank Street location was on July 27, 2008.

=== 2010s: expansion ===
Pastor Rick Reed left the church in November 2012 after 14 years of service. The Phase IIA Building Project added a 300-seat chapel, additional Sunday school classrooms, an expanded library and additional washrooms at a debt-free budget of $3.3 million. Future plans will increase the number of auditorium seats to 2,100, bringing its size to that of a small megachurch. The chapel's purpose is to provide overflow seating while also allowing smaller events to take place there.

In 2017, the church has a regular attendance of 2,700.

== Staff ==
=== Senior Pastors ===
The following senior pastors have served at the Metropolitan Bible Church:

- 1932-1943 Rev. Andrew Telford,
- 1943-1944 Rev Archie McGilvray,
- 1944-1949 Rev George Darby,
- 1950-1960 Pastor James Vold,
- 1961-1972 Pastor Arthur Larson,
- 1972-1983 Rev H.D. (Buddy) Arnold,
- 1986-1993 Pastor David Epstein,
- 1993-1998 Pastor David Bell,
- 1998-2012 Pastor Rick Reed,
- 2014-2015: Pastor Jay Klopfenstein
- 2015-2016: Pastor Tim Auld
- 2016-2025: Pastor Jonathan Griffiths

== See also ==
- List of the largest evangelical churches
- List of the largest evangelical church auditoriums
