= Heritage Place (Ottawa) =

Office building in Ontario, Canada

Coordinates: 45.421465°N 75.699159°W

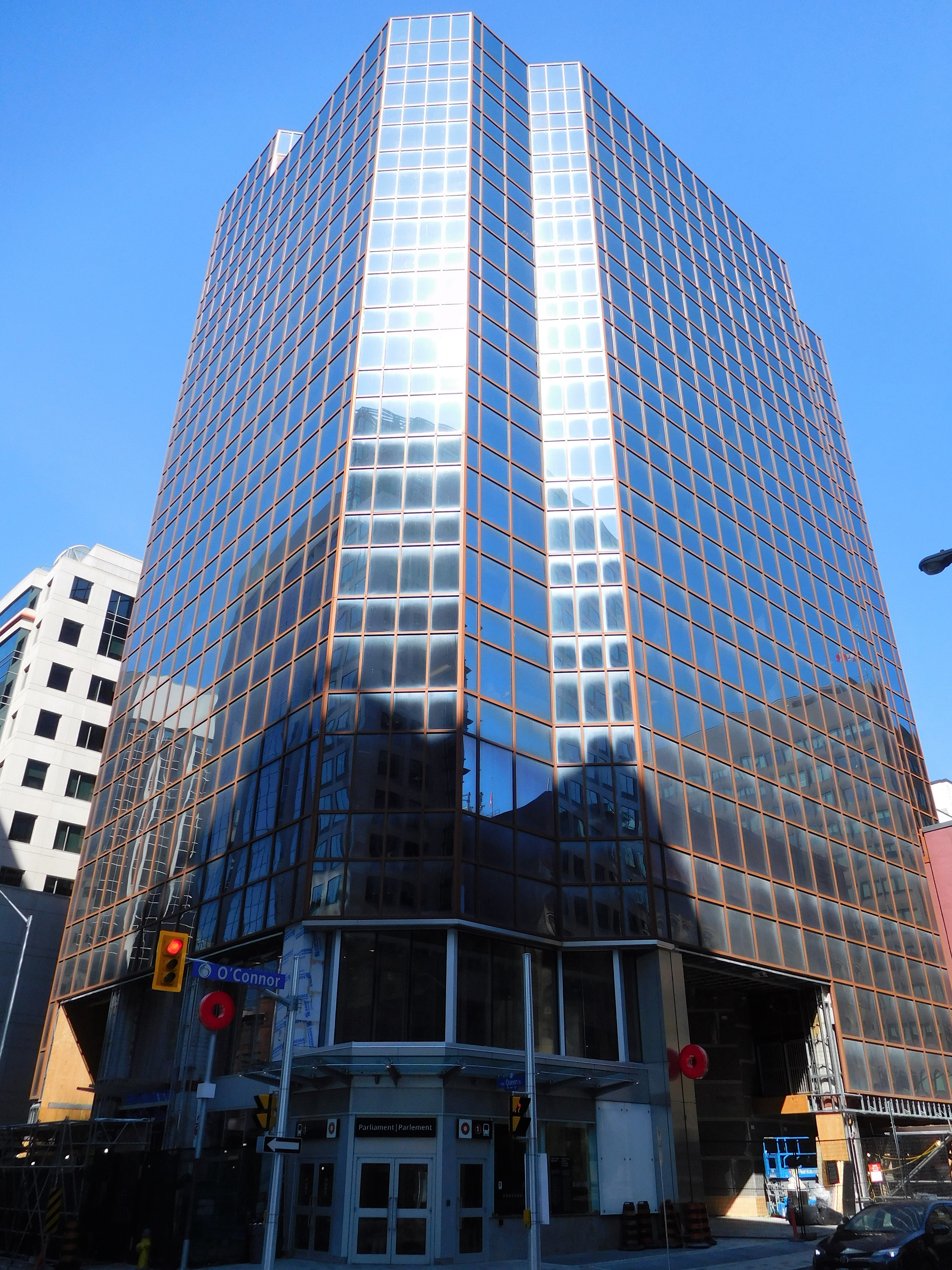
Heritage Place 155 Queen Street (Ottawa)

Built in 1985, Heritage Place is located in Ottawa, Ontario, Canada and home to many Government of Canada offices. The government departments in the building include Environment Canada and Industry Canada.

The building has 14 storeys and offers views of the Sparks Street Mall and Parliament Hill. The building offers underground parking as well as a small café called Biscotti's Coffee House which offers lunch specials and snacks.

Since the opening of the Confederation Line in September 2019, the corner of O'Connor and Queen features an integrated entrance to Parliament station.
