= List of mosques in the National Capital Region (Canada) =

This is a list of mosques in Ottawa, Ontario, Canada

In 2001, the number of Muslims in Ottawa was 80,000, according to Ottawa Muslim Cemetery Inc. Ottawa is experiencing a mosque building boom with half a dozen mosques being built or expanded. The Assunah Muslims Association is building a mosque in Ottawa South and the Kanata Muslim Association is fundraising to seek a large location to replace the space it rents at a community centre.

Name	Images	Province	Location	Year	Sect
Rhoda Institute for Islamic Spiritual Learning (Sanad Collective)		Ontario	Orleans	2015	Sunni
Ottawa Mosque (Ottawa Muslim Association),		Ontario	Champlain Park	1962	Sunni
Abo Ther Mosque		Ontario	Overbrook	1993	Shia
Al-Batool Fatima Association		Ontario	Britannia	1993	Shia
Ahlul-Bayt Centre		Ontario	Albion	2020	Shia
Ahmadiyya Muslim Mosque (Ahmadiyya Muslim Association)		Ontario	Cumberland	2004	Shia
Ahmadiyya Muslim Mosque Kanata (Ahmadiyya Muslim Association)		Ontario	Kanata	2016	Shia
Assalam Mosque (Ottawa) (Ottawa Islamic Centre)		Ontario	Canterbury		Sunni
Ottawa Ismaili Mosque (Ismaili Council for Ottawa),Ottawa Mosque		Ontario	Greenboro	2013	Shia
Bilal Masjid mosque		Ontario	Orleans	1993	Sunni
Jami Omar Mosque –		Ontario	Bells Corners	2004	Sunni
Islamic Shia Ithna-asheri Association		Ontario	Bells Corners	1994	Shia
South Nepean Muslim Community		Ontario	Barrhaven	2015	Sunni
The Mosque of Aylmer Gatineau Mosque		Quebec	Aylmer	2004	Sunni
Outaouais Islamic Centre (Centre islamique de l'Outaouais)		Quebec	Hull		
Kanata Muslim Association		Ontario	Kanata	2026	Sunni
Stittsville Muslim Association		Ontario	Stittsville	2016	Sunni

== See also ==
- Islam in Canada
- List of religious buildings in Ottawa
- List of mosques in Canada
