= St. Alban's Anglican Church (Ottawa) =

Coordinates: 45.426675°N 75.685099°W

St. Albans Anglican Church
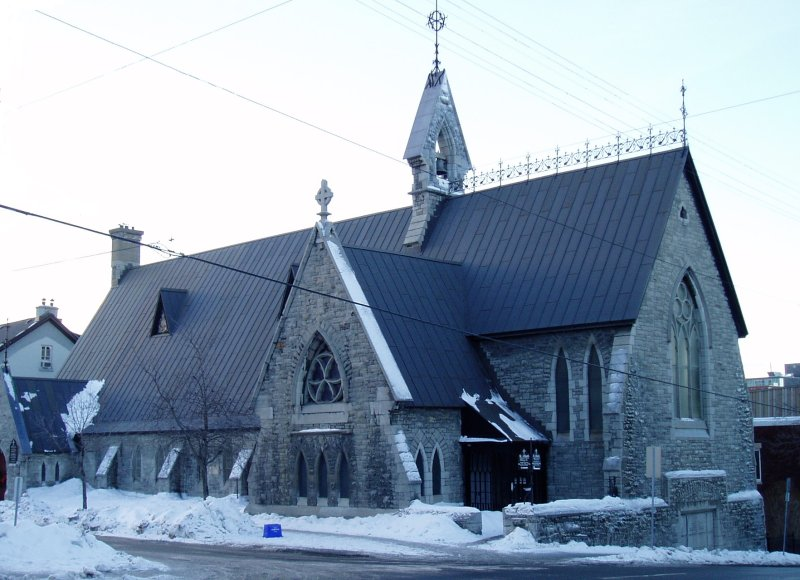
- St. Albans Anglican Church Daly Street in Sandy Hill Ottawa, Ontario
- St. Albans Anglican Church
- Location: 454 King Edward Avenue; Ottawa, Ontario; K1N 7M8
- Denomination: Anglican Church of Canada
- Website: http://www.stalbanschurch.ca

History
- Dedication: St. Alban

Administration
- Province: Ecclesiastical Province of Ontario
- Diocese: Anglican Diocese of Ottawa

St. Albans Anglican Church is an Anglican church in the Sandy Hill neighbourhood of Ottawa, Ontario, Canada. It is one of Ottawa's oldest surviving church buildings and one of its most historic.

== History ==
St. Alban's started in Sandy Hill in 1865. The original Gothic Revival design for the church was done in 1866 by Thomas Fuller, who also designed Canada's original Parliament Buildings.

The cornerstone of the church was laid on May 9, 1867. Construction of the church began in 1867 and it was completed in 1868. The chancel and vestry were completed by King McCord Arnoldi (1843–1904). 1876-77

However, the location of the church, at the corner of King Edward and Daly (454 King Edward Avenue), is on a steep hill and Fuller's elaborate plans had to be greatly scaled back. The church was attended by many of Canada's early political leaders, including Sir John A. Macdonald.

The church rectory was designed in 1898 by Charles Penruddocke William Kivas Band of Band, Burrit & Meredith.

The church's namesake is Saint Alban, who was the first British Christian martyr. He was martyred for "harbouring and sheltering the oppressed and terrified" (Michael W. Newton, The Parish of St. Alban the Martyr, Ottawa 1865-1877).

The building has a Municipal designation under the Ontario Heritage Act, Section 29. There is an Ontario Heritage Trust easement agreement.

== Controversy and split ==
In 2008, after the Anglican Diocese of Ottawa decided to allow clergy to bless same-sex marriages, St. Alban's and its sister church, St. George's, voted to leave the Anglican Church of Canada in favour of a breakaway group, the Anglican Network in Canada. The vote at St. Alban's was 79-1 in favour of the move. In 2010, the Diocese sued for possession of both buildings; a settlement was reached in January 2011, in which St. George's was sold to the ANiC but St. Alban's returned to its original diocese. ANiC clergy would have to leave, though the diocese stressed that members of the congregation remained welcome at the building.

On June 26, 2011, during the last Sunday service before the required move-out date, Bishop Charlie Masters led the former St. Alban's congregation out of the building and into a temporary location inside the Ottawa Little Theatre. Reverend George Sinclair stressed the move was not simply about homosexuality, but about the broader direction of the church and the need to uphold biblical authority. As of May 2016, the congregation continues to meet at the Ottawa Little Theatre, under the name Church of the Messiah.

== New congregation ==
The Anglican Diocese of Ottawa officially took possession of the building and name of St. Alban's Church on July 1, 2011. July 3, 2011, the first service under the new incumbent Reverend Mark Whittall, featured a baptism and an address from Bishop John Chapman, who described St. Alban's as a "spirit-led, Christ-centred and contemporary urban church". Though an "official opening" was held in September 2011, extensive renovations were needed to accommodate the return of Centre 454 to the church basement, as well as create office space and washrooms upstairs to compensate for the space the Centre would be taking up. These were not complete until November 2012, one month after Rev. Whittall was finally inducted.

Since then, St. Alban's has been involved in a number of notable activities, such as hosting the uOttawa Open Table event, a free monthly meal for students and young adults; participating in the city-wide Big Give, an annual series of free pop-up stores for in-need neighbours; and officiating the first example of a transgender renaming liturgy in the Ottawa diocese. In January 2016, Rev. Whittall published a book on his experience so far at St. Alban's, titled ReInvention: Stories from an Urban Church.

== Centre 454 ==
Between 1976 and 2000, the basement at St. Alban's was home to Centre 454, an Anglican Community Ministry drop-in site for homeless and "precariously housed" people. The Centre moved for a time to rented space on Murray Street, but returned to St. Alban's in 2012 after extensive renovations of the basement. The Centre features regular social activities, as well as an ODSP support worker program to improve access to disability benefits, and "in-reach" services from outside professionals.
