= Ottawa French Seventh-day Adventist Church =

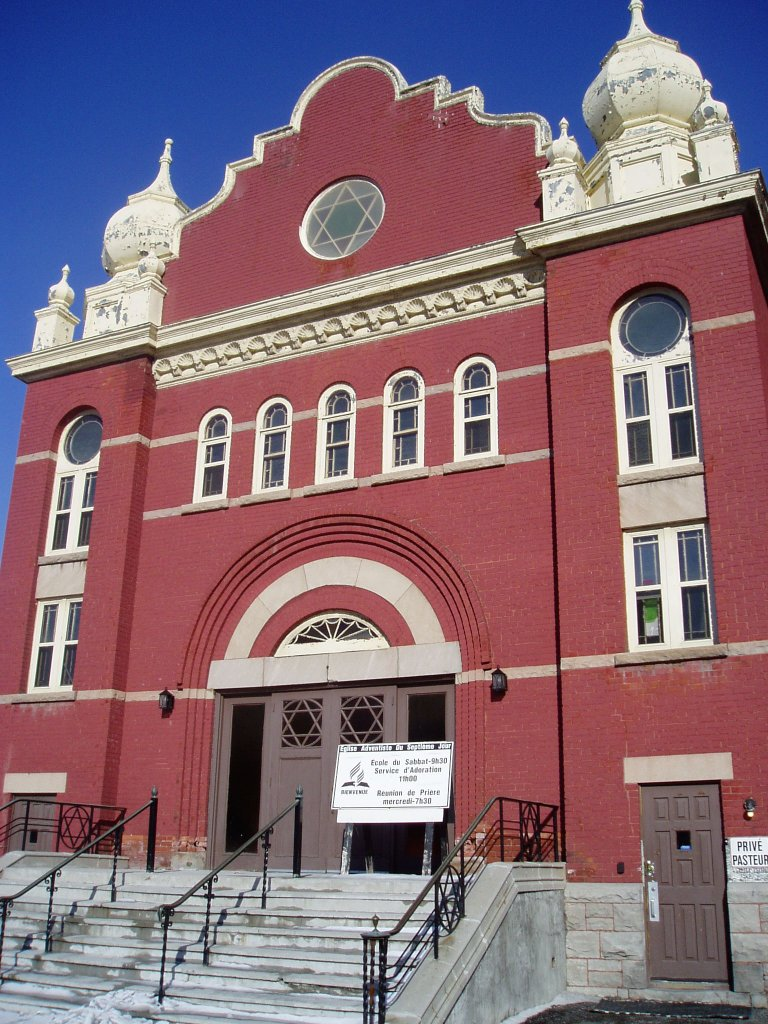
- Ottawa French Seventh-day Adventist Church
- Ottawa French Seventh-day Adventist Church
- 45.429883°N 75.685989°W
- Location: 375 King Edward Avenue; Ottawa, Ontario; K1N 7M5
- Denomination: Seventh-day Adventist

Administration
- Province: Canada
- Diocese: Adventist Diocese of Ontario
- Parish: Ontario

The Ottawa French Seventh-day Adventist Church is a francophone Seventh-day Adventist church in Ottawa, Ontario, Canada. It is located on King Edward Avenue, just north of Rideau Street.

== History ==
The building was originally constructed in 1904 as a synagogue for the Adath Jeshurun congregation. The first purpose-built synagogue in Ottawa, the building was designed by noted architect John W.H. Watts, and was home to the city's first Jewish congregation. In 1957, Adath Jeshurun and the Agudath Achim congregation merged to form the Beth Shalom congregation. The new group moved to a new synagogue at the corner of Rideau and Chapel Street. The synagogue became a memorial chapel and the funerals of many Ottawa notables were held there. In 1999, the building was sold to the Seventh-day Adventist Church.

Following a request from the Lowertown Community Association, the city of Ottawa designated the building as a heritage building in 2016. The Seventh-day congregation opposed the decision.

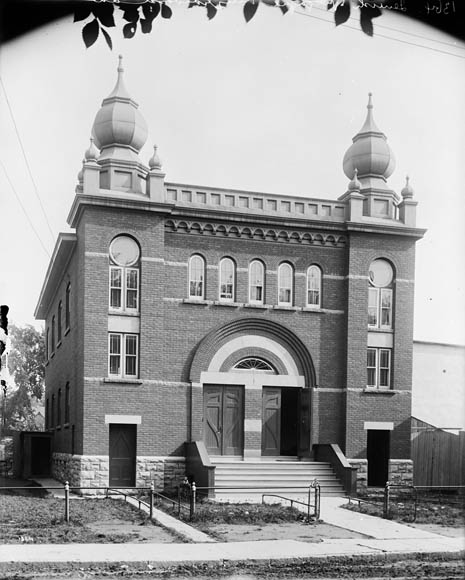
The building in the early 20th century, when it was still a synagogue
