= Ottawa Mosque =

Mosque in Ottawa, Ontario, Canada

- French: Mosquée d'Ottawa
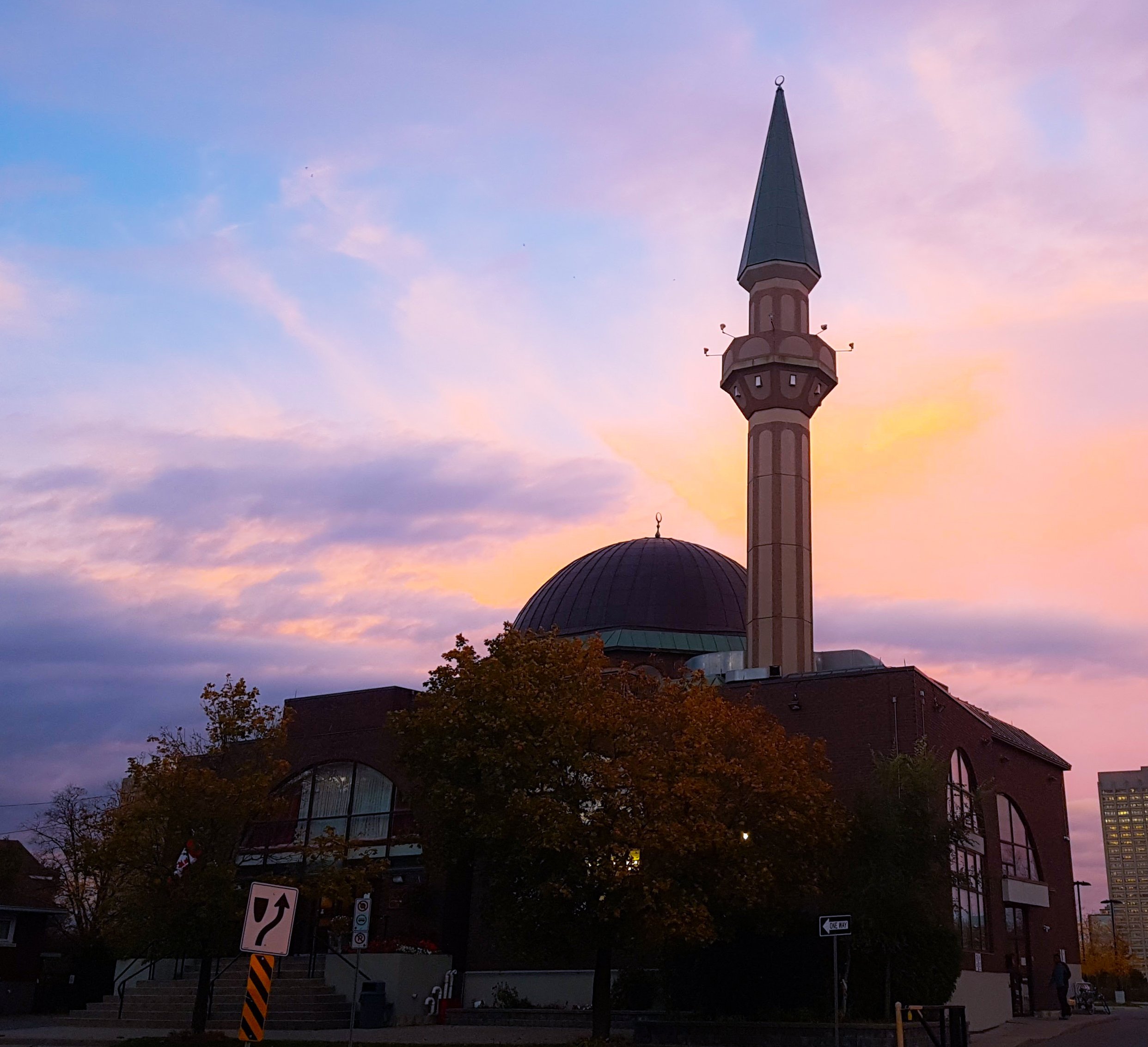
- The mosque at sunset, in 2018

- Location of the mosque in Ottawa

Religion
- Affiliation: Islam
- Ecclesiastical or organisational status: Mosque
- Status: Active

Location
- Location: 251 Northwestern Ave, Ottawa, Ontario
- Country: Canada
- Coordinates: 45°24′05″N 75°44′29″W

Architecture
- Architect: Ghazi Anwar Asad
- Type: Mosque architecture
- Style: International
- Established: 1965 (as a congregation)
- Groundbreaking: September 1973
- Completed: 1977

Specifications
- Capacity: 700 worshippers
- Dome: One
- Minaret: One
- Minaret height: 35 m (115 ft)
- Materials: Brick

The Ottawa Mosque (French: Mosquée d'Ottawa) is a mosque in Ottawa, Ontario, Canada. It is the oldest mosque in Ottawa and one of the oldest mosques in Canada.

== History ==
The Muslim community in Ottawa was informally established in the 1940s. Initially, the group in the grounds of the Western United Church and then the Northwestern United Church. The Ottawa Muslim Association was formed in 1962, and incorporated in 1965. Prayers at major religious festivals, such as Eid-al-Fitr, were held at the Pakistan High Commission and the Egyptian Embassy. In 1970, two houses on Northwestern Avenue were acquired and used as a prayer room and for the delivery of other services.

The establishment of the mosque was announced in 1972, approval from government officials in the following year, the first prayer services held on 26 March 1975, and despite not being fully completed, was opened for Mawlid on 3 March 1977.

== Architecture ==
Designed by architect Ghazi Anwar Asad in the International style, the mosque consists of two floors and can accommodate up to 700 worshippers. Its minaret is 35 metres (115 ft) high. The mosque also features a library, meeting rooms, childcare center and event halls. It also houses the headquarters of the Ottawa Muslim Association.

== See also ==
- Islam in Canada
- List of mosques in Canada
