= Beit Tikvah of Ottawa =

Modern Orthodox synagogue

- בית תקוה של אוטווה
- Location in Nepean

Religion
- Affiliation: Modern Orthodox Judaism
- Rite: Nusach Ashkenaz
- Ecclesiastical or organizational status: Synagogue
- Leadership: Rabbi Zischa Shaps (interim) (since July 1, 2024)
- Year consecrated: 1985
- Status: Active
- Religious features: Star of David

Location
- Location: 15 Chartwell Avenue, Ottawa, Ontario K2G 4K3
- Interactive map of Beit Tikvah of Ottawa
- Coordinates: 45.331844°N 75.768968°W

Architecture
- Groundbreaking: September 9, 1984
- Completed: September 11, 1985
- Direction of façade: South

Website
- www.cbto.ca

Beit Tikvah, officially Congregation Beit Tikvah Ottawa, abbreviated as CBTO, is a Modern Orthodox synagogue located in the Nepean district of Ottawa, Ontario, Canada, serving the Craig Henry area.

== History ==
The Jewish population of Ottawa grew from 20 families in 1889 to approximately 5,500 in 1961.

=== Beth Shalom ===
Beth Shalom congregation represents the amalgamation in 1956 of two orthodox congregations, Adath Jeshurun and Agudath Achim. B'nai Jacob congregation amalgamated with Beth Shalom in 1971. The first officials were Rabbi Simon L. Eckstein, Cantor Emeritus, Joseph Rabin, Cantor Hyman Gertler, Ritual Director Jacob Y. Cement, Secretary Louis Slack and President, Bernard M. Alexandor. The congregation commenced with 850 families, with about 150 being singles or widows. A synagogue, designed by Hazelgrove and Lithwick, was inaugurated on Rosh Hashana, 1956.

=== Beit Tikvah ===
Beit Tikvah was founded in 1982 as Beth Shalom West, a satellite congregation of Beth Shalom Ottawa, located in the Craig Henry area of Ottawa. After a groundbreaking ceremony held on September 9, 1984, construction commenced on land donated by Jack and Irving Aaron. The synagogue officially opened for Shabbat services on September 11, 1985.

== Clergy ==
Rabbi Michael Orelowitz became the congregation's first rabbi in 1982 and was succeeded by Rabbi Gershon Sonnenschein in 1984. Rabbi Gershon Sonnenschein became the first full-time rabbi in 1989, followed by Rabbi Howard Finkelstein, on August 8, 1991, until his 2019 retirement and appointment as Rabbi Emeritus. Rabbi Finkelstein was succeeded by Rabbi Aryeh Kravetz in 2021.

Rabbi Howard Finkelstein is married to Rivka Finkelstein, and they moved to Ottawa in 1991. He was the Rabbi of CBTO (formerly Beth Shalom West) for 28 years, and was previously the Rabbi at Kingston's Beth Israel Synagogue for 12 years. While in Ottawa, Rabbi Finkelstein was a teacher at Yitzhak Rabin High School (1995-2015) as well as the Dean of Judaic studies at the Ottawa Jewish Community School (2015–2019). He was then replaced with Rabbi Aryeh Kravitz, who left on June 30, 2024. The current rabbi is Rabbi Zischa Shaps who is the current interim rabbi.

== Jewish Memorial Gardens ==
As of 1 July 2008, each of the Founding Members: Congregation Machzikei Hadas; Congregation Beth Shalom; Agudath Israel (Ottawa); the Jewish Reform Congregation Temple Israel (Ottawa); Young Israel of Ottawa; Congregation Beit Tikvah of Ottawa transferred to Jewish Memorial Gardens the cemetery lands that they had.
