= Young Israel of Ottawa =

Orthodox synagogue in Ottawa, Ontario

- Location in Ottawa

Religion
- Affiliation: Orthodox Judaism
- Ecclesiastical or organizational status: Synagogue
- Leadership: Rabbi Gavriel Rudin
- Status: Active

Location
- Location: 1762 Carling Avenue, Westboro, Ottawa, Ontario K2A 2H7
- Country: Canada
- Interactive map of Young Israel of Ottawa
- Coordinates: 45.386860°N 75.741314°W

Architecture
- Established: 1967

Website
- youngisraelottawa.ca

Young Israel of Ottawa is an Orthodox synagogue located in Westboro, a suburb of Ottawa, Ontario, Canada.

== History ==
The Jewish population of Ottawa grew from 20 families in 1889 to approximately 5,500 in 1961. The Young Israel of Ottawa congregation began in 1967 as an orthodox minyan which met in the basement of Rose and Moe Litwack's home on Kirkwood. In 1968, a store on Merivale Road, which is now demolished, was dedicated on March 31, 1968. In 1968, a Sefer Torah was donated by the late Gilbert Greenberg. In 1980, a property consisting of a basement and first floor was purchased at 627 Kirkwood Avenue. The upper floor was constructed in the late summer of 1980. The synagogue was dedicated On August 17, 1980.

Rabbi Howard G. Messinger was the first spiritual leader followed by part-time rabbis who were also teachers at Hillel Academy such as Rabbi Millen, principal of Hillel Academy, Rabbi Pritzker, teacher, Rabbi Wolkenstein and Rabbi Ben Natan. Rabbi Mordecai Y. Berger arrived as spiritual leader in 1976.

== Jewish Memorial Gardens ==
As of 1 July 2008, each of the Founding Members: Congregation Machzikei Hadas; Congregation Beth Shalom; Agudath Israel (Ottawa); the Jewish Reform Congregation Temple Israel (Ottawa); Young Israel of Ottawa; Congregation Beit Tikvah of Ottawa transferred to Jewish Memorial Gardens the cemetery lands that they had.
