= Central Park (disambiguation) =

Central Park is a large public park in New York City, United States.

Central Park may also refer to:

== Places ==
=== Australia ===
- Central Park, Sydney, a major urban renewal project in Sydney

=== Canada ===
- Central Park, Alberta, a community, Alberta
- Central Park (Burnaby), a park in Burnaby, British Columbia
- Central Park (Ottawa), a park in central Ottawa, Ontario
- Central Park, Ottawa, a neighbourhood in Ottawa
- Central Park (Winnipeg), a park and a neighbourhood in Winnipeg, Manitoba
- Central Memorial Park, a park in central Calgary, Alberta

=== China ===
- People's Park (Guangzhou) or Central Park

=== Finland ===
- Central Park (Helsinki), a park in Helsinki, Finland

=== India ===
- Central Park, Jaipur, a park in Jaipur, India
- Central Park, Kharghar, a park in Mumbai, India
- Central Park (Kolkata), a park in Kolkata, India
- Sunder Nursery or Central Park, a heritage park in Delhi, India

=== Indonesia ===
- Central Park Jakarta, a shopping mall in West Jakarta

=== Japan ===
- Shinjuku Central Park, Japan

=== Kazakhstan ===
- Central Park (Almaty), a park in Almaty, Kazakhstan

=== Peru ===
- Miraflores Central Park, a park in Miraflores, Lima

=== Poland ===
- Central Park, Bydgoszcz, a park in Bydgoszcz, Kuyavian–Pomeranian Voivodeship

=== Romania ===
- Cluj-Napoca Central Park, Romania

=== Russia ===
- Central Park (Tolyatti), Russia

=== South Korea ===
- Songdo Central Park, Incheon, South Korea

=== Taiwan ===
- Central Park (Kaohsiung), a park in Kaohsiung, Taiwan

=== United Kingdom ===
- Central Park, Chelmsford, a park in Chelmsford, Essex, England
- Central Park, East Ham, a park in East Ham, London
- Central Park, Peterborough, Cambridgeshire
- Central Park, Plymouth, a park in Devon, England
- Central Park, Scunthorpe, a park in Scunthorpe, Lincolnshire
- Central Park (Telford), a business park in Shropshire, England
- Central Park, Wallasey, Merseyside

=== United States ===
- Central Park, Birmingham, Alabama, a neighborhood in Ensley, Alabama
- Central Park, Glendale, California
- Central Park (San Mateo), a park near downtown San Mateo, California
- Central Park, a park in Santa Clarita, California
- Fremont Central Park, Fremont, California
- Central Park, Denver, a neighborhood in Denver, Colorado, formerly known as Stapleton
- Central Park, a park in Largo, Florida
- Doral Central Park, in Doral, Florida
- Central Park (Atlanta), a park in the Old Fourth Ward neighborhood of Atlanta, Georgia
- Garfield Park (Chicago) in Chicago, Illinois, originally called Central Park
- Central Park, Louisville, a park in Louisville, Kentucky
- Central Park, Buffalo, New York a neighborhood in Buffalo, New York
- Bethpage, New York or Central Park, Nassau County, New York
- Central Park, Nine Mile Creek, Bloomington, Minnesota
- Loring Park or Central Park, in Minneapolis, Minnesota
- Central Park of Maple Grove, Maple Grove, Minnesota
- Central Park, Owatonna, Minnesota
- Central Park, Carmel, Indiana
- Central Park, Johnstown, Pennsylvania
- Central Park (San Francisco)
- Central Park, Washington, a census-designated place in Grays Harbor County
- Central Park, Wisconsin, an unincorporated area in Kenosha County
- Central Park (Midland, Michigan), a recreation park

== Structures ==
=== Stadiums ===
- Central Park, Cowdenbeath, a football stadium in Cowdenbeath, Scotland
- Central Park (Denbigh), a football stadium in Denbigh, Wales
- Central Park (Pittsburgh), a 1921–1925 baseball stadium in Pittsburgh, Pennsylvania, US
- Central Park (Wigan), a former rugby league stadium in Wigan, Greater Manchester
- Central Park Stadium, a greyhound stadium in Kent

=== Other structures ===
- Central Park (Hong Kong), a private housing estate in Hong Kong
- Central Park (shopping complex), a shopping complex in Fredericksburg, Virginia
- Central Park (skyscraper), in Perth, Western Australia
- Central Park Jakarta, a mixed-use complex in Jakarta, Indonesia
- Central Park Public School, a public elementary school in Markham, Ontario
- Dusit Central Park, a building complex in Bangkok, Thailand
  - Central Park Bangkok, a shopping mall located within Dusit Central Park owned by Central Group

== Film and television ==
- Central Park (1932 film), an American crime film
- Central Park (1990 film), a documentary film directed by Frederick Wiseman
- Central Park (2017 film), a film featuring Marina Squerciati
- Central Park (TV series), an American musical animated sitcom

== Other uses ==
- Central Park (Allentown, Pennsylvania), a defunct amusement park (1892-1951)
- Central Park (pinball), a 1966 Gottlieb pinball machine
- Central Park, a train operated by Amtrak as part of the Clocker service

== See also ==
- Central Park Station (disambiguation)
- Park Central (disambiguation)
- Central Perk
