= Park Central =

Park Central may refer to:

- Park Central, Birmingham, England, UK; a real estate development
- Park Central, Gauteng, Johannesburg, South Africa; a suburb
- Park Central (Hong Kong), a housing estate and shopping mall
- Park Central Building, Los Angeles, California, USA; an office building
- Park Central Hotel, Manhattan, New York City, State of New York, USA
- Park Central Hotel San Francisco, San Francisco, California, USA
- Park Central Mall, Phoenix, Arizona, USA; a shopping mall

== See also ==
- Central (disambiguation)
- Park (disambiguation)
- Central Park (disambiguation)
