= Talee =

Shopping mall in Qianjin, Kaohsiung, Taiwan

- 高雄大立
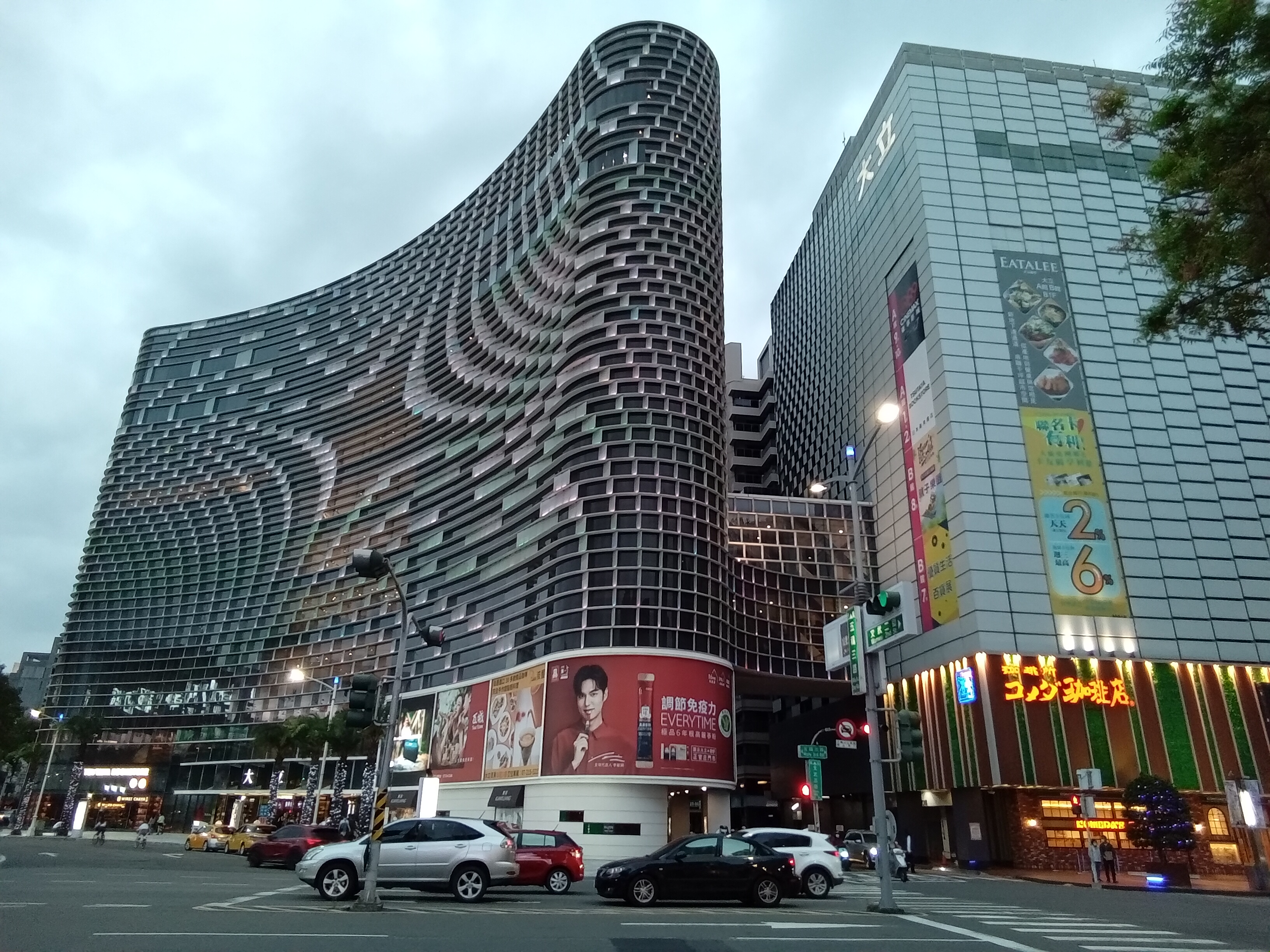
- Location: Qianjin District, Kaohsiung, Taiwan
- Coordinates: 22°37′18.65″N 120°17′54″E
- Address: No. 57, Wufu 3rd Road, Qianjin District, Kaohsiung, Taiwan
- Opened: 1984
- Floor area: 40,991 m^{2} (441,220 sq ft)
- Floors: Building A: 10 floors above ground, 2 below ground Building B: 13 floors above ground, 1 below ground
- Public transit: Central Park metro station
- Website: https://www.talee.com.tw/

Talee (Chinese: 高雄大立) is a prominent shopping center complex of two buildings located in Qianjin District, Kaohsiung, Taiwan. Established in 1984, it is operated by the Datong Group and holds the distinction of being one of the longest-standing department stores in Kaohsiung. The department store is known for its iconic rooftop amusement facilities, which include a carousel and pirate ship.

== History ==
In 1984, Talee opened under the ownership of Datong Group, becoming a key retail destination in Kaohsiung. In 1991, Datong Group partnered with Japan's Isetan Group, rebranding the store as Talee Isetan, marking the first Japanese-style department store in the city. In 2008, After Isetan merged with Mitsukoshi to form Isetan Mitsukoshi Holdings, Datong ended its partnership with Isetan. The store was renamed back to Talee. Datong Group consolidated operations under a single entity, the Talee Department Store, and opened a new section known as STAR PLACE in November. In 2019, STAR PLACE was rebranded as Talee A Building, while the original department store became Talee B Building. The two buildings were interconnected with multi-level walkways. In 2023, Several high-profile tenants, including Don Don Donki, Muji's flagship store, Nitori's flagship store, and Komeda’s Coffee, opened within the complex. This elevated its status as a major retail hub in southern Taiwan.

== Transportation ==
Situated at No. 57, Wufu 3rd Road, Qianjin District, Talee is centrally located, making it within walking distance of the Central Park metro station on the Red Line of Kaohsiung Metro.

== See also ==
- List of shopping malls in Taiwan
