= Peterborough Festival =

Festival held in Peterborough, UK

Coordinates: 52.569°N 0.239°W

The Peterborough Festival is held annually in the UK city of Peterborough. The festival takes place over a two-week period, usually the last week of June and the first week of July.

The first set of events of the festival take place at the embankment, beside the Town Bridge. The second set take place at Central Park next to the Regional College.

The festival attracts a crowd of over 100,000 each year, and is aimed and bringing communities together. Parades, music and performances are all included, with Indian, Caribbean and European music featured each year. The festival has also included a fishing event.

In 2010 the community radio station Radio Peterborough launched during the festival.
