= Pembroke Public Library (disambiguation) =

Pembroke Public Library may refer to:

- Pembroke Public Library, a single-branch public library in Pembroke, Ontario, Canada]
- Pembroke Public Library, a branch of the Statesboro Regional Public Libraries in Georgia, United States

== See also ==
- Pembroke Library, a public library in Dublin, Ireland
