= Urban Spotlight Arcade =

Arcade in Qianjin, Kaohsiung, Taiwan

Urban Spotlight Arcade 城市光廊
- Light gallery
- {{{other_names}}}
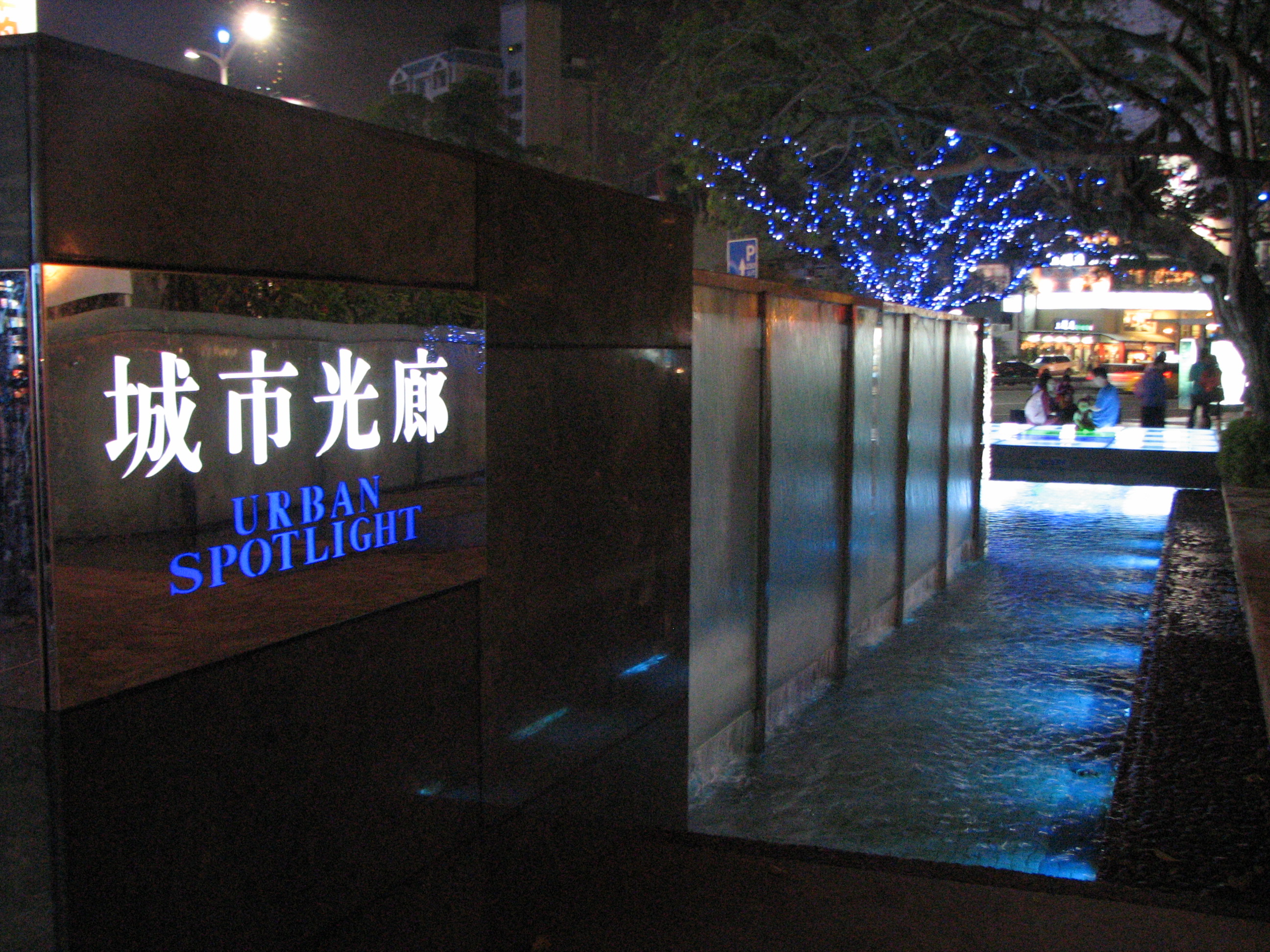
- Opened: 2001
- Location: Cianjin, Kaohsiung, Taiwan
- Interactive map of Urban Spotlight Arcade 城市光廊
- Coordinates: 22°37′18″N 120°17′54″E

The Urban Spotlight Arcade (Chinese: 城市光廊; pinyin: Chéngshì Guāng Láng) is located at Central Park, Cianjin District, Kaohsiung, Taiwan. It spans from the roundabout of Wu-Fu 3rd Road and Chung-Hua Road to the intersection of Wu-Fu 3rd Road and Chung-Shan road. It is famous for its light decoration in the evening.

== History ==
The arcade was constructed in 2001 with a series of lighting along the pedestrian and rebuilt in 2014 with the addition of art and performance spaces.

== Transportation ==
The venue is accessible from Central Park Station of Kaohsiung MRT.

== See also ==
- List of tourist attractions in Taiwan
