= Central Park Station =

Central Park Station may refer to:

- Central Park station (Incheon), South Korea
- Central Park metro station, Kolkata, West Bengal, India
- Central Park metro station (Taiwan), Kaohsiung, Taiwan
- Central Park tram stop, Manchester, UK
- Central Park station (CTA), Chicago, USA
- Central Park station (Chongqing Rail Transit), Chongqing, China
- Central Park station (Suzhou Metro), Suzhou, China
- Central Park station (RTD) in Denver, Colorado, USA
