= Kaohsiung Li De Baseball Stadium =

Baseball stadium in Qianjin, Kaohsiung, Taiwan

- 高雄市立立德棒球場

- Taiwan
- Location: 217, Shihjhong 1st. Rd., Cianjin, Kaohsiung, Taiwan
- Coordinates: 22.629381°N 120.288958°E
- Owner: Kaohsiung City Government
- Capacity: 9,500 (1974); 15,000 (Proposed)
- Surface: Dirt
- Field size: Left Field Line - 320 ft Center Field - 380 ft Right Field Line - 320 ft

Construction
- Groundbreaking: Japanese Administration Era (exact date unknown)
- Opened: Japanese Administration Era (exact date unknown)

Tenant
- Lamigo Monkeys (CPBL) (Minor league)

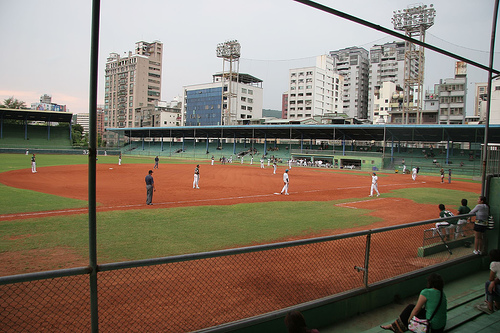
Kaohsiung Li De Baseball Stadium

Kaohsiung Li De Baseball Stadium (Chinese: 高雄市立立德棒球場; pinyin: Gāoxióng Shìlì Lìdé Bàngqiúchǎng) is a baseball stadium in Cianjin District, Kaohsiung, Taiwan. It is mainly used for junior and amateur level baseball games, but also frequently hosts the minor league games of the Lamigo Monkeys, a professional baseball team based in Chengching Lake Baseball Field and also uses Li De Stadium as a secondary stadium.

== History ==
The stadium was built during the Japanese Administration Era; however, the exact date of completion and first game was not recorded. It was renamed Li De Baseball Stadium in 1975, in honor of Li De Baseball Team. Due to its location, which is in the center of Kaohsiung city, the stadium saw frequent use during the early days of Chinese Professional Baseball League. However, after the completion of the Chengching Lake Baseball Field, located in Kaohsiung county, the stadium experienced a decline in professional uses, until Lamigo Monkeys moved in and turned Li De Stadium into their home stadium of minor league team.

== Refurbishment ==
In 2009, the City of Kaohsiung converted Li De Stadium to a softball field for the Kaohsiung World Games softball tournament. There are plans to return it to a baseball field after the tournament.

== See also ==
- List of stadiums in Taiwan
- Sport in Taiwan
