= Banff National Park Pavilion =

Park pavilion in Banff, Alberta

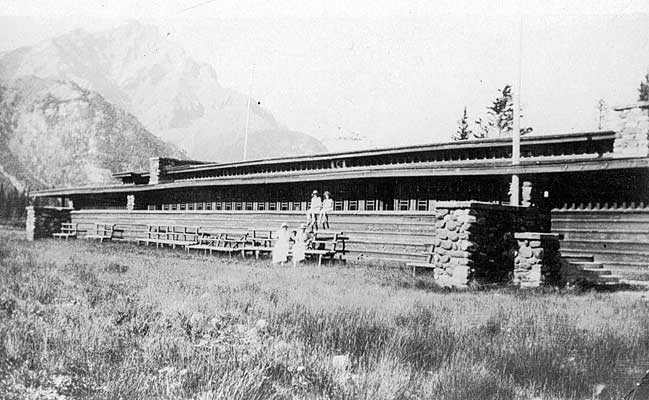
- The Pavilion, circa 1920
- Interactive map of the Banff National Park Pavilion area
- Alternative names: Frank Lloyd Wright Pavilion

General information
- Type: Public pavilion
- Architectural style: Prairie School
- Coordinates: 51°10′25″N 115°34′46″W
- Construction started: Designed 1911; Construction 1913
- Completed: 1914
- Demolished: 1939
- Cost: CAD$20000 $40000 (estimated 1913) $100000 (speculated 1964)
- Client: Public Works and Government Services Canada

Dimensions
- Other dimensions: 200ft x 50ft

Technical details
- Floor count: Single

Design and construction
- Architects: Frank Lloyd Wright; Francis Conroy Sullivan
- Main contractor: Bennett, Debman, & Co.

The Banff National Park Pavilion was designed by Frank Lloyd Wright in conjunction with Francis Conroy Sullivan, one of Wright's only Canadian students. Designed in 1911, in the Prairie School style, construction began in 1913 and was completed the following year. The pavilion was built on the Recreation Grounds near the south end of the Bow River Bridge on the edge of the town of Banff, itself located within Banff National Park in Alberta. The last of only two Wright designs in Canada, the pavilion was demolished in 1938.

== History ==
Banff National Park had been established in 1885 as Banff Hot Springs Reserve. Expanded in 1887 as Rocky Mountains Park under the Rocky Mountains Park Act the area became the first national park in Canada, and the second in North America behind Yellowstone. As a national park the controlling authority became the Federal Government of Canada, rather than the province of Alberta.

Sullivan, unrelated to Wright's previous employer Louis Sullivan, had worked in Wright's Oak Park Studio before leaving for Ottawa in 1908 to work for the government as an architect for, as it was then known, the Department of Public Works.

By the 1900s Banff National Park, as it had become known, was increasing in popularity and, by 1911, had become accessible by automobile. A visitor pavilion was commissioned by government officials in Ottawa. A concept plan had been submitted by residents of Banff to Ottawa, but officials rejected it. Envisioning a more refined structure Wright and Sullivan were hired. The building contract was awarded to Bennett, Debman, & Co., of Calgary who aimed to use local labour and purchase building supplies from local merchants.

After completion, in 1914 during World War I, the pavilion was used as a Quartermaster's store by the Department of National Defence. After the War the main function of the pavilion became a gathering area for tourists waiting on trains.

Wright and Sullivan worked together on four built projects. While the Banff National Park Pavilion is attributed to Wright with Sullivan's assistance, the other three are attributed to Sullivan with Wright's assistance.

== Design ==
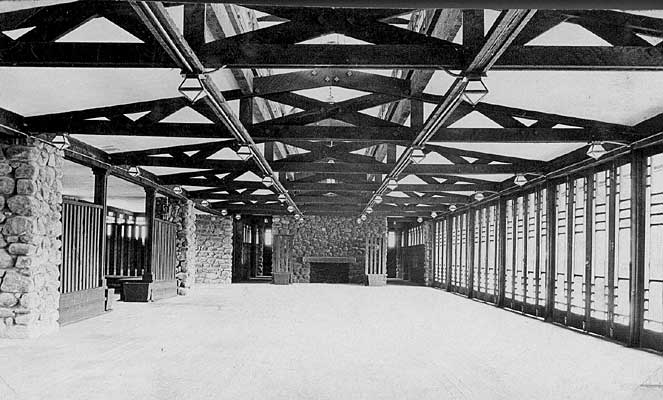
Interior, circa 1913. Assembly lounge, art glass windows on the right, fireplace at the far end.

The pavilion featured a rustic style over a frame construction, and was an elongated visitor shelter of wood and stone. Supported by low stone walls the length of the building was constructed of wood, in a board-and-batten fashion. Steel beams supported the cantilevered roof.

The interior was primarily an assembly lounge 100 ft by 50 ft in size. A row of art glass windows ran the entire length of the wall opposite the main entrance, and three cobblestone fireplaces featured on the remaining three. Clerestory windows contributed additional light, through the exposed beams of the roof.

A ladies' powder room was at one end of the lounge, with a gentlemen's retiring room at the other. Each room measured 50 ft by 25 ft. The pavilion also featured public lockers.

The finished product was only usable four months of the year, suitable only for a few summer sports, and as a picnickers' lounging area.

Similar in design to the River Forest Tennis Club, in River Forest, Illinois, the pavilion is also considered comparable to the Lake Geneva Hotel, in Lake Geneva, Wisconsin, also designed in 1911 and itself demolished in 1970.

== Destruction ==
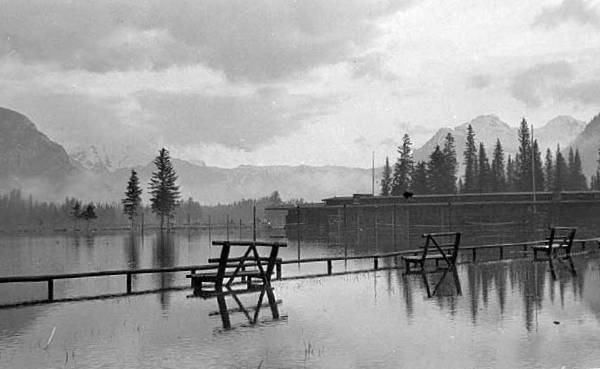
Flooded Pavilion grounds, circa 1920.

Built on the shore of the Bow River, on swampy ground, the pavilion was subject to flooding, severe frost, and consequent decay.

The Banff Crag and Canyon reported in July 1920 that;

"The grounds in front of the recreation building were under water last week, and it was possible for a man, if so inclined, to wade out to the building, sit on the steps and fish."

The pavilion suffered severe flood damage in 1933, and deterioration progressed to the point that the building was torn down in 1938. Ruins of the pavilion were visible until the early 1960s, but by 1965 all traces had been washed away or sunk into the bog.

== Controversy ==
During its life residents saw the building as a symbol of Ottawa's contempt for their concerns. Wanting a building designed for local recreational needs, the original and unused plans included areas for curling and ice hockey, calling for a building that could be used year-round. Those plans were overseen by locals and approved by Banff residents after a public meeting at the National Park Theatre. In December 1913, just months after construction began the Banff Crag and Canyon reported that;

"....their wishes and desires were, as usual, ignored by the 'overlords' at Ottawa, who imagine they are wiser as to the conditions in Banff than those who live and have their being here."

Years later, in July 1920, the Banff Crag and Canyon reported of the building and grounds that;

"They are neither ornamental nor useful—except as a standing monument to the incapacity of Parks Commissioner Harkin."

Nevertheless, the building was reasonably popular with local residents, and in the last thirty years, interest has grown in the structure and Wright's short-lived career and legacy in Canada.

== See also ==
- List of Frank Lloyd Wright works
