= Cianjin District, Kaohsiung =

District in Kaohsiung, Taiwan

Coordinates: 22°37′43.7″N 120°17′41.6″E

Cianjin 前金區 Chienchin, Qianjin
- District
- Cianjin District
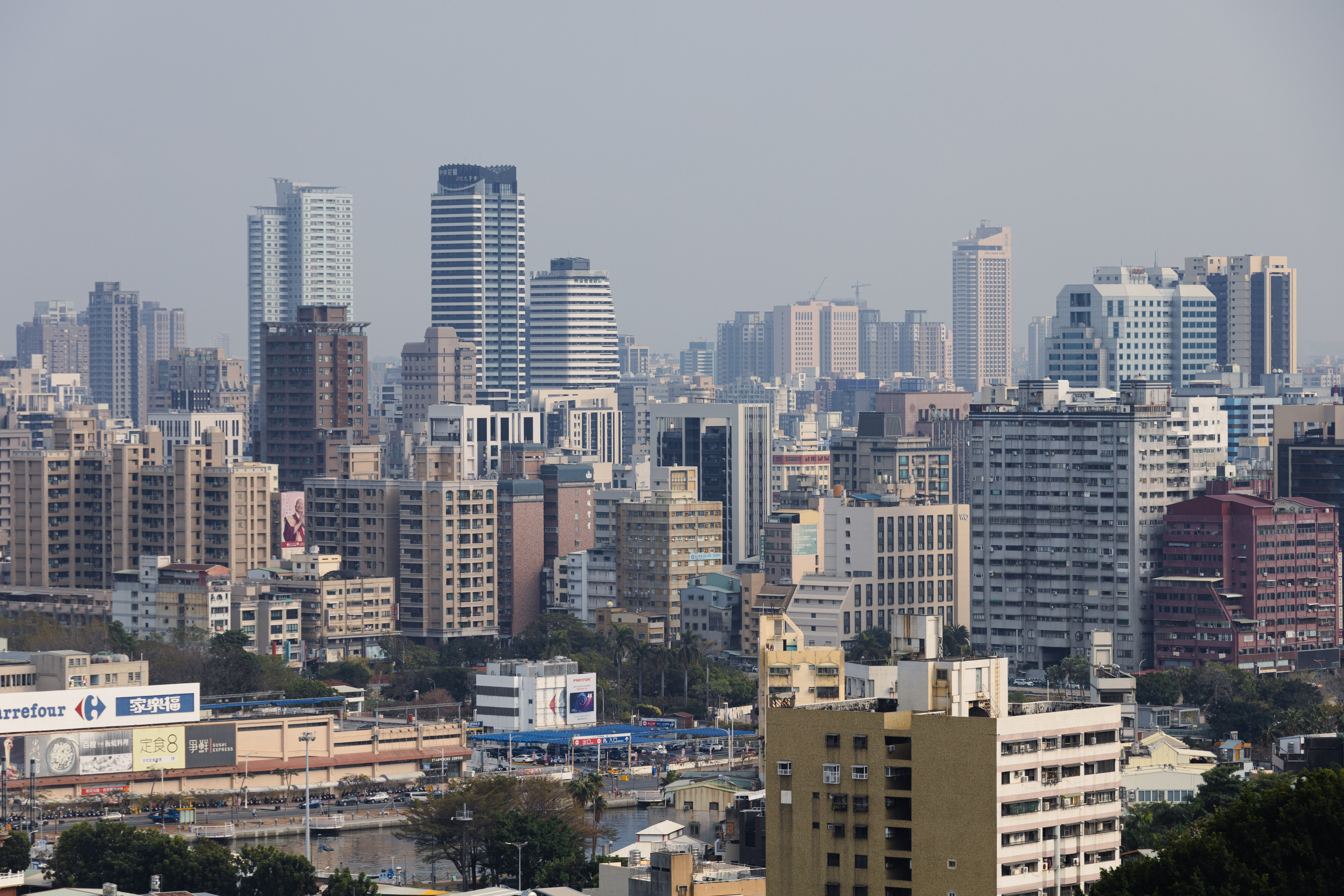

- 高雄市前金區公所; Cianjin District Office Kaohsiung City

- Cianjin District in Kaohsiung City
- Country: Taiwan
- Region: Southern Taiwan

Area
  - Total: 1.8573 km^{2} (0.7171 sq mi)
  - Rank: 36

Population (October 2023)
  - Total: 27,053
  - Rank: 27
  - Density: 14,566/km^{2} (37,725/sq mi)
- Website: chiengin.kcg.gov.tw/en/

Cianjin District (Chinese: 前金區; Hanyu Pinyin: Qiánjīn Qū; Tongyong Pinyin: Ciánjin Cyu; Wade–Giles: Ch'ien^{2}-chin^{1} Ch'ü^{1}) is an urban district of Kaohsiung City, Taiwan. It is the third smallest district in Kaohsiung City, with a land area of 1.8573 square kilometers, or 0.7171 square miles. It has a population of 27,053, as of October 2023, making it the 12th least populated district of Kaohsiung.

== Geography ==
Cianjin District borders Yancheng District to the west, Sinsing District to the east, Sanmin District to the north, and Lingya District to the south.

== Administrative divisions ==
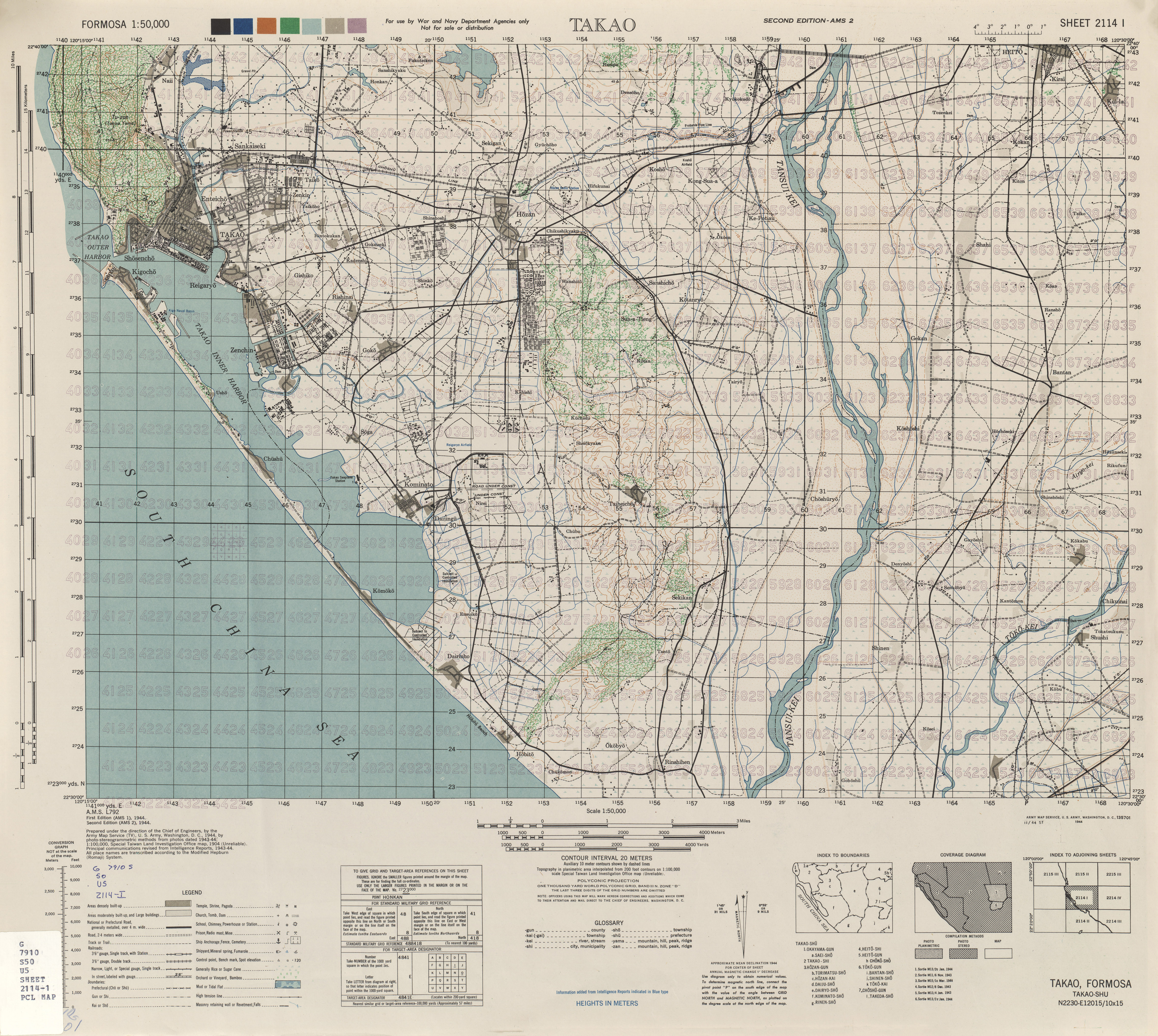
Map including Zenkin (present-day Cianjin District area) (AMS, 1944)

Villages in Cianjin District

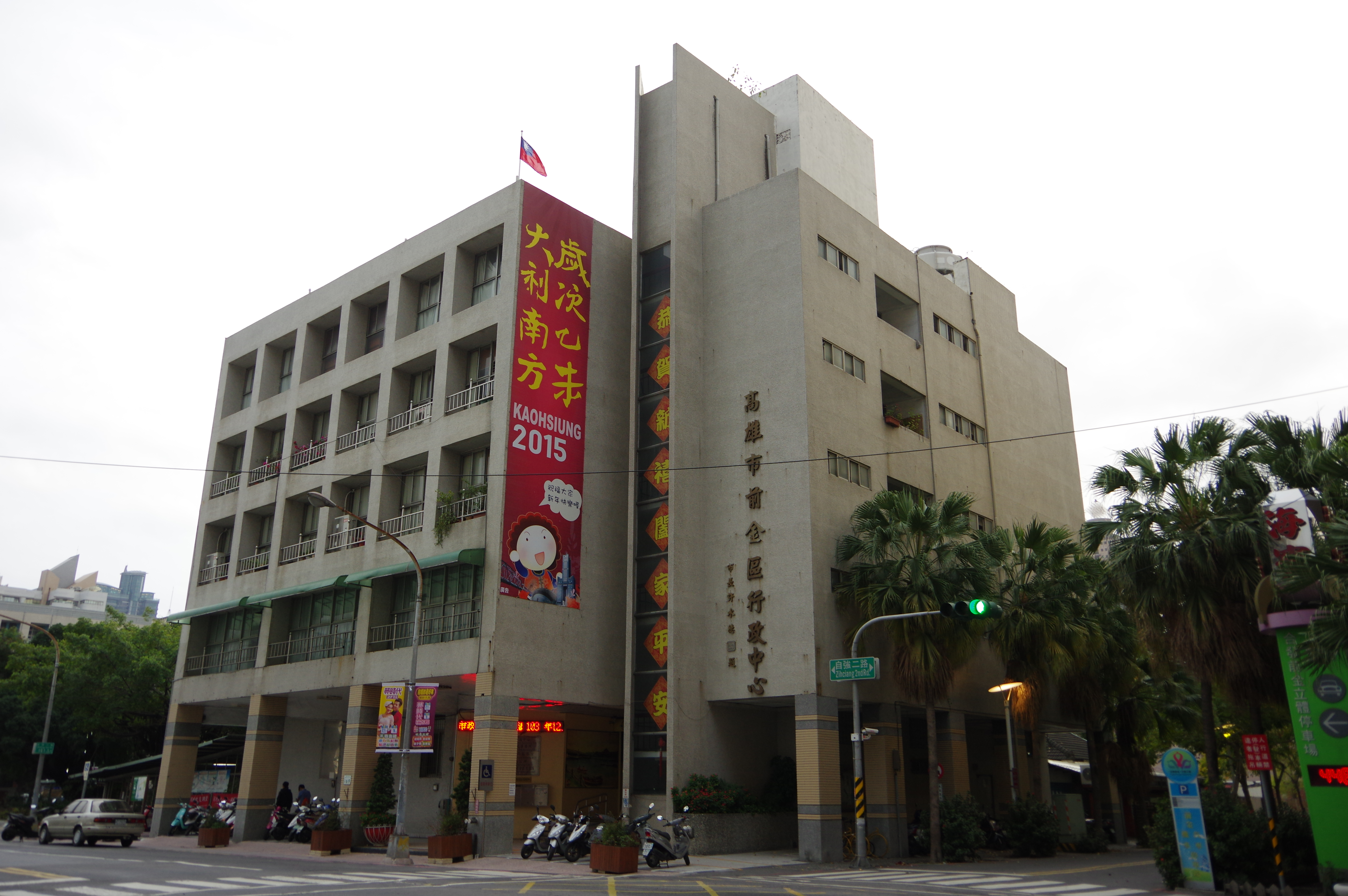
Cianjin District office

Cianjin District consists of 20 villages and 263 neighborhoods. The villages in the district are Sanchuan, Caojiang, Zhangcheng, Beijin, Tungjin, Xinsheng, Houjin, Zhangxing, Jingshan, Minsheng, Fuyuan, Lintou, Guomin, Shetung, Shexi, Zhangsheng, Rongfu, Wenxi and Wentung Village.

== Institutions ==
- Taiwan Ocean Research Institute

== Tourist attractions ==
- Central Park
- Kaohsiung Li De Baseball Stadium
- Kaohsiung Museum of Labor
- Kaohsiung Public Library
- Love River
- Urban Spotlight Arcade

== Transportation ==
The district is accessible from Cianjin Station and Central Park Station of the Kaohsiung MRT.

The district is also served by Provincial Highway 17.
