= Francis Conroy Sullivan =

Canadian architect

- Born: July 2, 1882; Kingston, Ontario, Canada
- Died: April 4, 1929 (aged 46); Scottsdale, Arizona, United States
- Occupation: Architect
- Projects: O'Connor Street Bridge; Banff National Park Pavilion,

Francis Conroy Sullivan (July 2, 1882 – April 4, 1929) was a Canadian architect.

The only Canadian pupil of Frank Lloyd Wright aside from Roger d'Astous, Sullivan worked in the Oak Park studio in 1907 but returned to Ottawa in 1908. Sullivan brought the modernist Prairie School style to Canada, building a number of prominent structures, often in the Prairie Style.

Sullivan was born in Kingston, Ontario. He was an architect for the Canadian Department of Public Works from 1908 to 1911, after which he had an independent practice in Ottawa until 1916. In this capacity he frequently designed schools for the Ottawa Catholic School Board. In 1920 he moved to Chicago and became the chief architect for the Chicago Public School Board.

Examples of Sullivan's work include:

- The O'Connor Street Bridge in Ottawa, Ontario, Canada – 1907
- 108 Acacia Ave., Ottawa - 1908
- Gainsborough Apartments, 285-291 Metcalfe Street, Ottawa - 1911
- The Banff National Park Pavilion, (with Frank Lloyd Wright), Banff National Park, Alberta, Canada – 1911
- No 7 Fire Station Arthur St., Ottawa – 1912; now commercial building
- Apartment House 204 Laurier Ave. E., Ottawa – 1913
- Ecole du Sacré Coeur (now School House Lofts), 19 Melrose Ave., Ottawa – 1912
- Pembroke Public Library, 237 Victoria St., Pembroke, Ontario, Canada – 1913
- Horticulture Building, Lansdowne Park, Ottawa – 1914; restored 2015
- Francis C. Sullivan House, 346 Somerset St. E., Ottawa – 1914
- Patrick J. Powers House, 178 James St., Ottawa – 1915
- Edward P. Connors House, 166 Huron Ave. N., Ottawa – 1915
- Ransome W. Dunning Residence 99 Acacia Ave., Ottawa
- Stonewall Post Office (Now a prominent antique shop and bookstore), 357 Main Street, Stonewall, Manitoba, Canada – 1915
- Church of Ste-Claire de Goulbourne (now St. Clare's Catholic Church), near Dwyer Hill, Ontario – 1915
- St. Martin of Tours Church, Glen Robinson Ont. (Destroyed by fire in the 1950s).
- 6 Allan Pl., Ottawa
- Shawville Post Office, 100 Victoria Ave., Shawville, Quebec, Canada – 1917
- Orthopedic Hospital, North Toronto Military Hospital – 1917 (demolished 1981)
- Service Storehouse North Toronto Military Hospital – 1917 (demolished 1981)
- Military convalescent Home, Coburg, Ont. – 1917
- Sir Oliver Mowat Sanatorium, Kingston Ont. – 1917
- Infirmary Building, Provincial Sanatorium, Kentville N.S. – 1917
- Military Convalescent Home, Guelph, Ont. – 1917, closed 2001 and vacant since 2014
- The Lindenlea Housing Project, Ottawa – 1919-21
- Bartholomew Armstrong Residence, 8 McLeod St., Ottawa – 1924
- Steinmetz High School, N. Mobile St. Chicago – 1925
- Calumet High School. E. May St., Chicago – 1925
- Edward J. Kelly Estate, Vilas County, near Eagle River, Wisconsin, United States – 1925

Although influenced by Wright, Sullivan's work diverged from Wright's in certain important ways. For example, whereas horizontals predominate in Wright's creations, Sullivan used strong verticals to create tension in his designs.

Sullivan went to Chandler, Arizona while in Wright's employ, and died there on April 4, 1929.

== Gallery ==
Works Designed by Sullivan

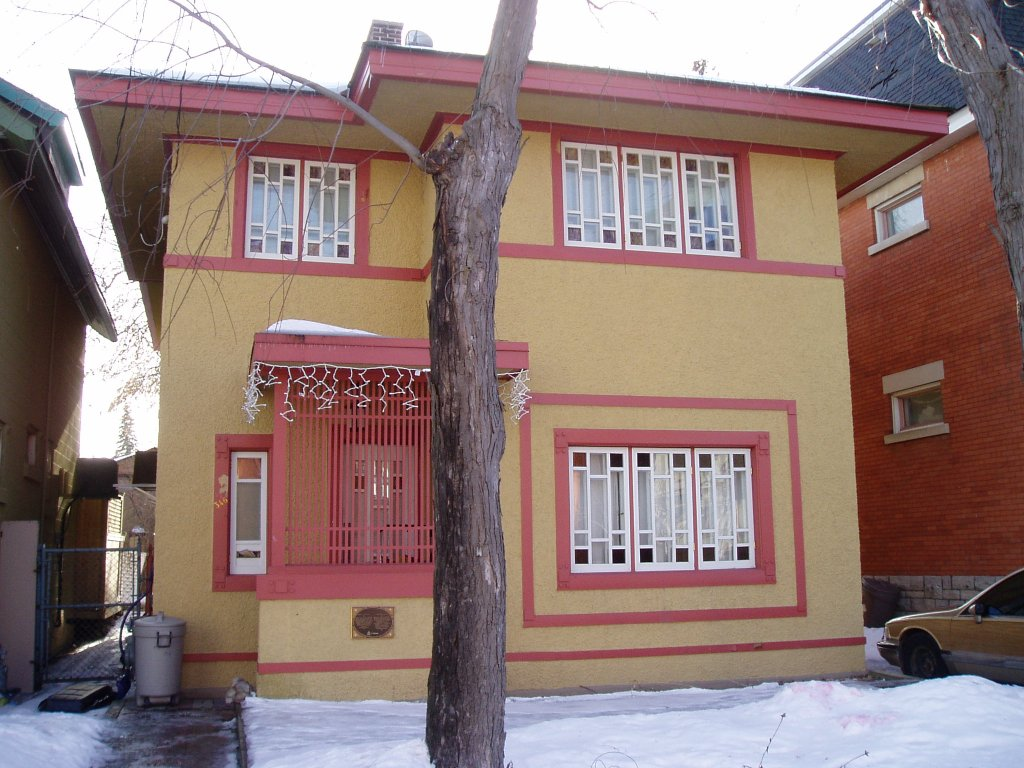
The house in the Sandy Hill, neighbourhood of Ottawa that Sullivan designed for himself in 1913.

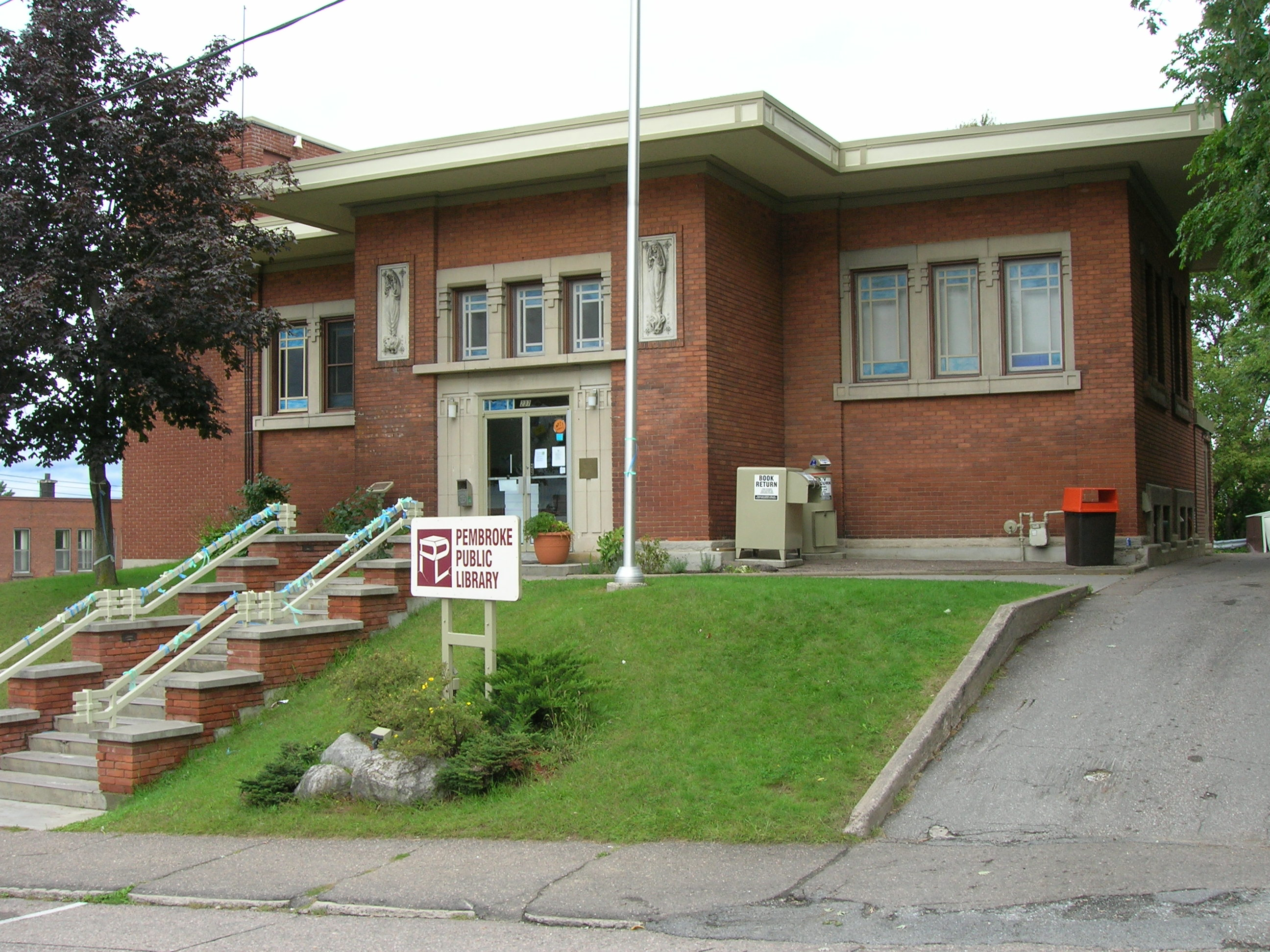
The Pembroke Public Library.

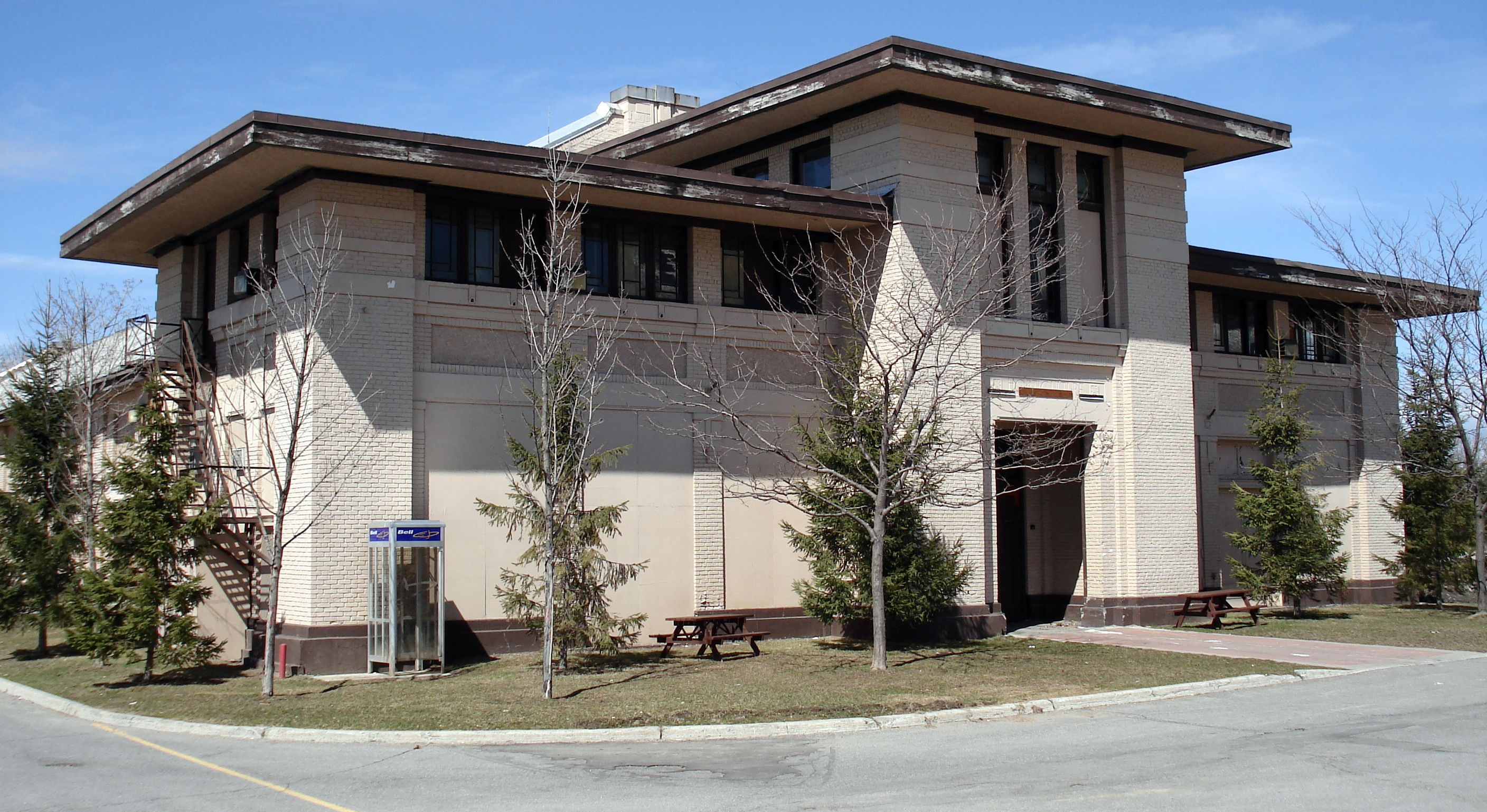
Horticulture building at Lansdowne Park, Ottawa.

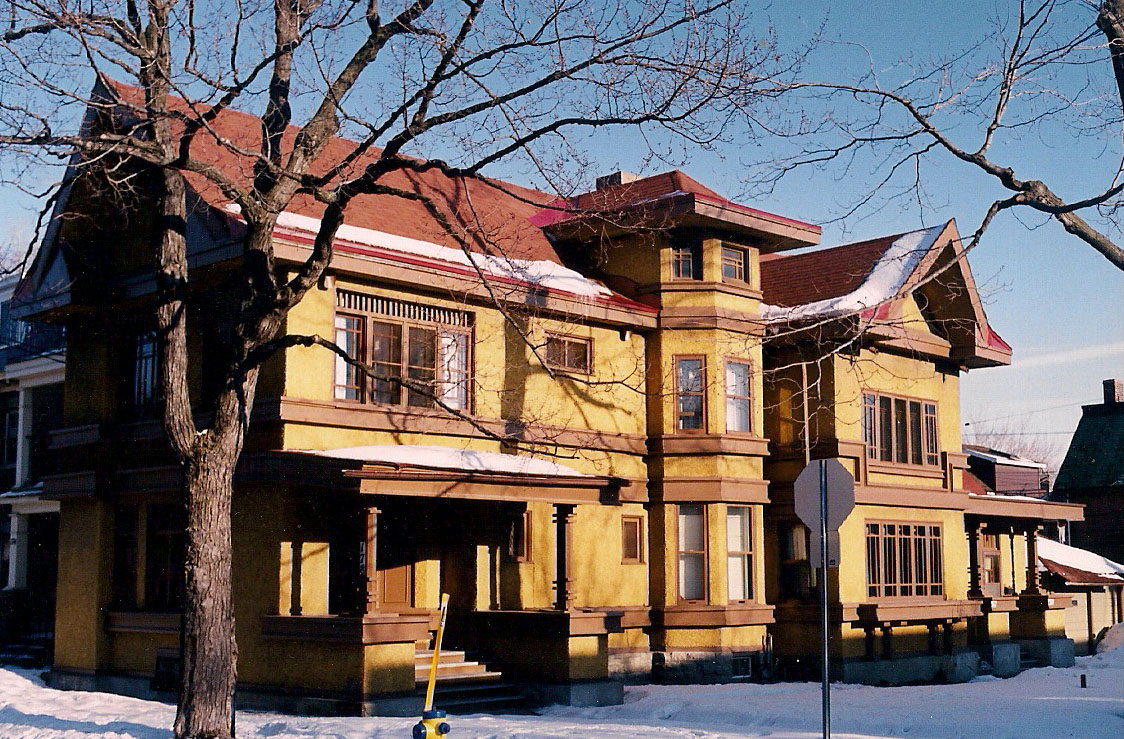
Patrick J. Powers Residence at James and Bay in Ottawa Ontario

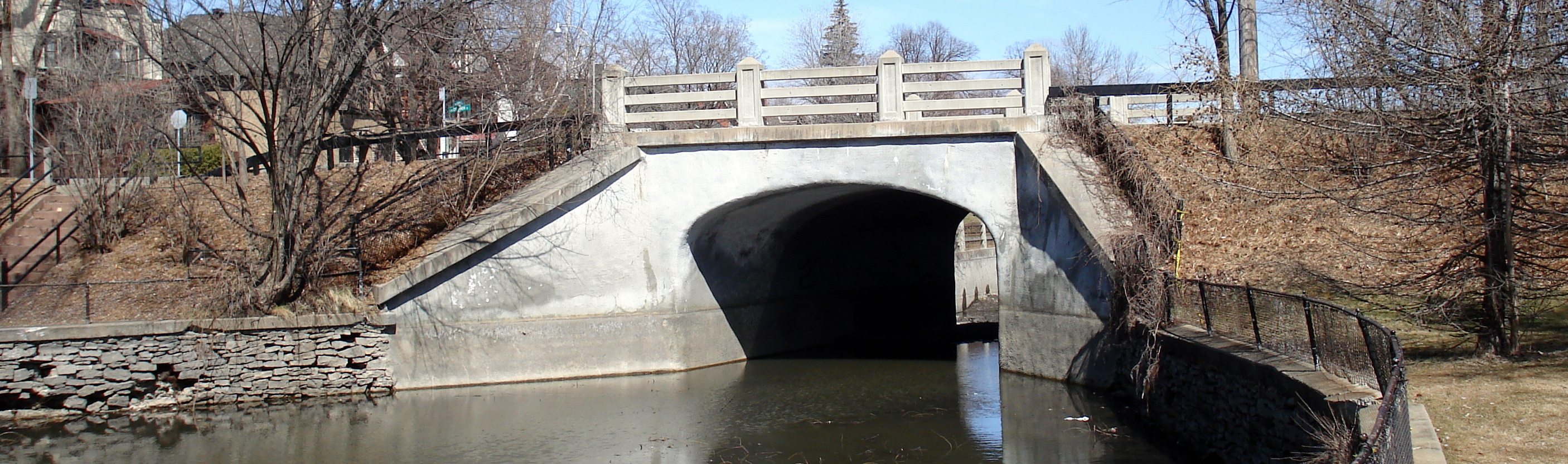
Bridge over Patterson Creek on O'Connor Street, Ottawa.

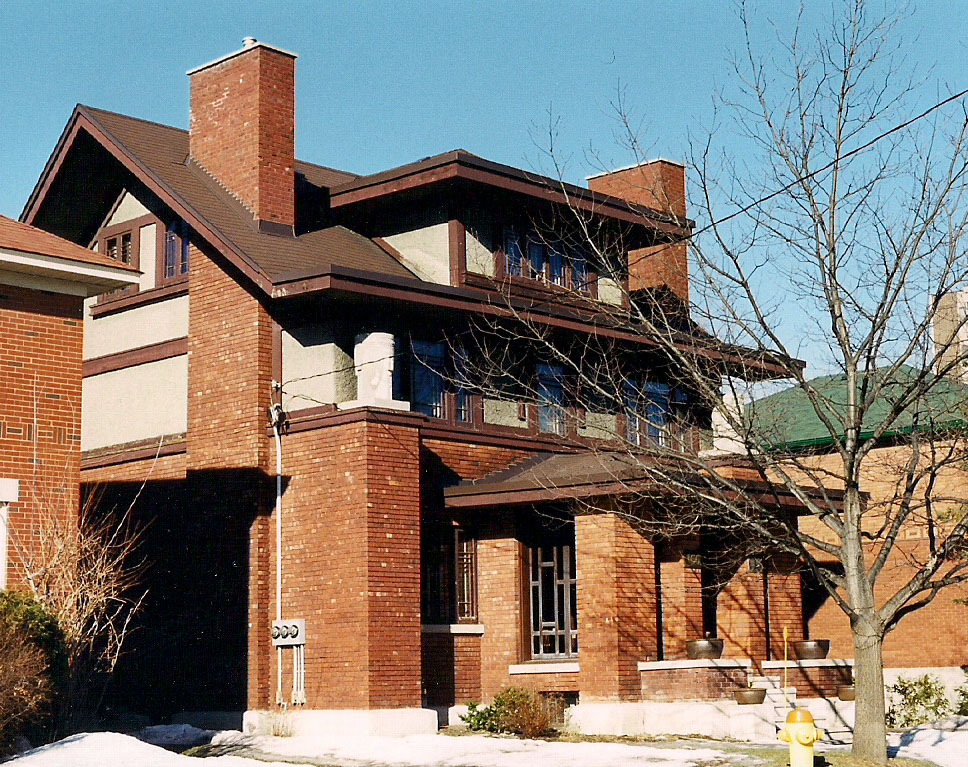
Edward J Conners Residence at 166 Huron St. Ottawa Ontario

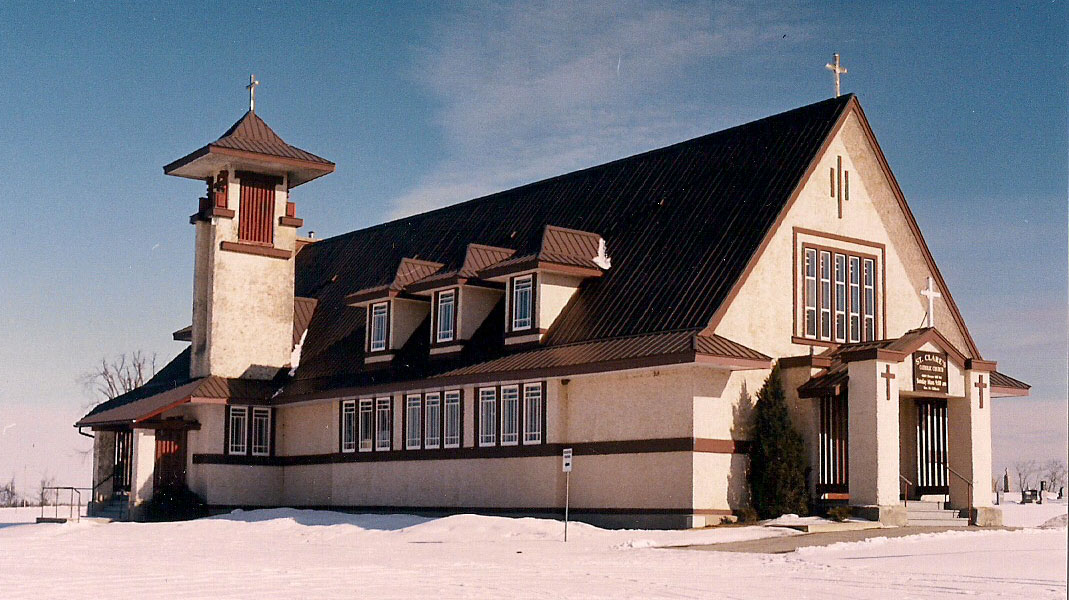
Ste. Claire de Goudbourne Church, Dwyer Hill Ontario

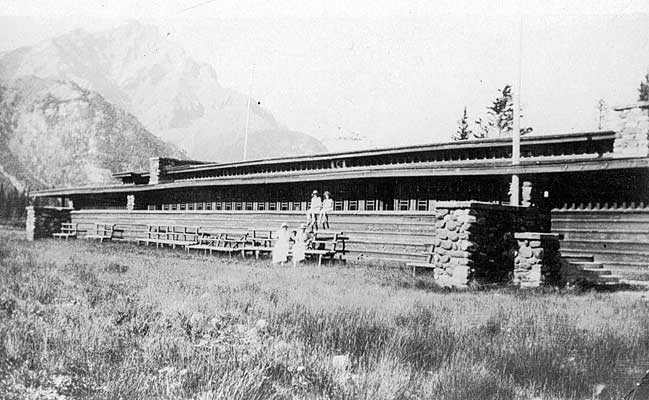
Banff National Park Pavilion, circa 1920

== See also ==
- List of designated heritage properties in Ottawa

== External ==
- Historic Places in Canada
