= Patterson Creek (Ottawa) =

Watercourse in Ottawa, Ontario, Canada

Coordinates: 45.4076°N 75.6834°W

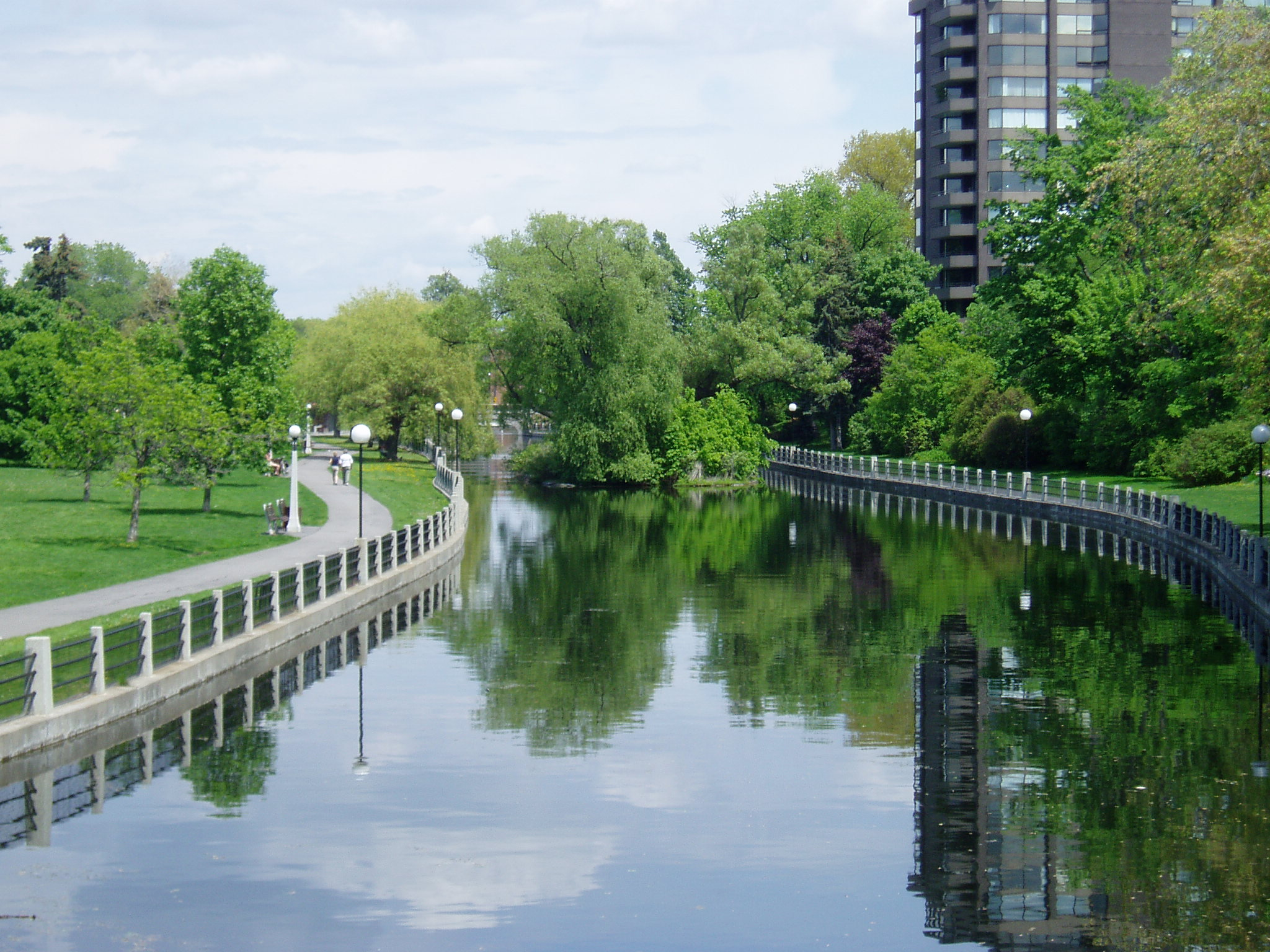
Patterson Creek seen from the O'Connor Street bridge

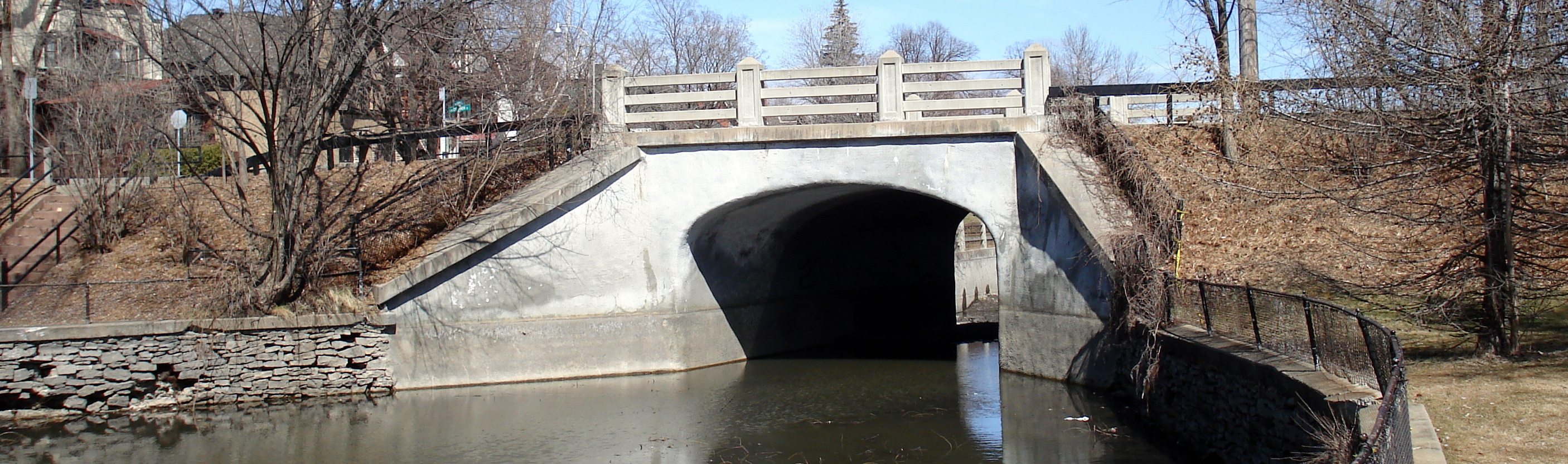
O'Connor Street bridge, designed by Francis Conroy Sullivan

Patterson Creek is a small body of water in the middle of Ottawa, Ontario. The creek was originally a small stream flowing east through a swampy area to the Rideau River. The construction of the Rideau Canal blocked the creek causing it to become much larger in size. Prior to the construction the land housed a Cedar Lodge. The construction created a small island in the creek that then housed the Cedar Lodge, but this structure was demolished in the 1930s. The Creek originally ran from near Lyon Street all the way to the canal. The creek was named after George Patterson, an early settler who owned the lot where the creek emptied into the canal. In the 1890s work began on landscaping the area. The western portion of the creek disappeared, replaced by Central Park in one of the first projects of the Ottawa Improvement Commission.

Today Patterson Creek runs for two blocks from the canal to just west of O'Connor Street. The creek is located in the northern part of the Glebe neighbourhood, just to the south of the Queensway and Centretown. The creek, and the landscaped park that surrounds it, are surrounded by large houses which are some of the most expensive in Ottawa. First Avenue Public School also looks out upon the creek. The creek is crossed by two bridges one at O'Connor and the other at the Queen Elizabeth Driveway.

During the winter the creek is cleared and used as a skating rink, along with the rest of the canal. It is generally used by young children and others who wish to avoid the rapid speed of the main canal.
