= Central Park, Jaipur =

Park in Jaipur, India

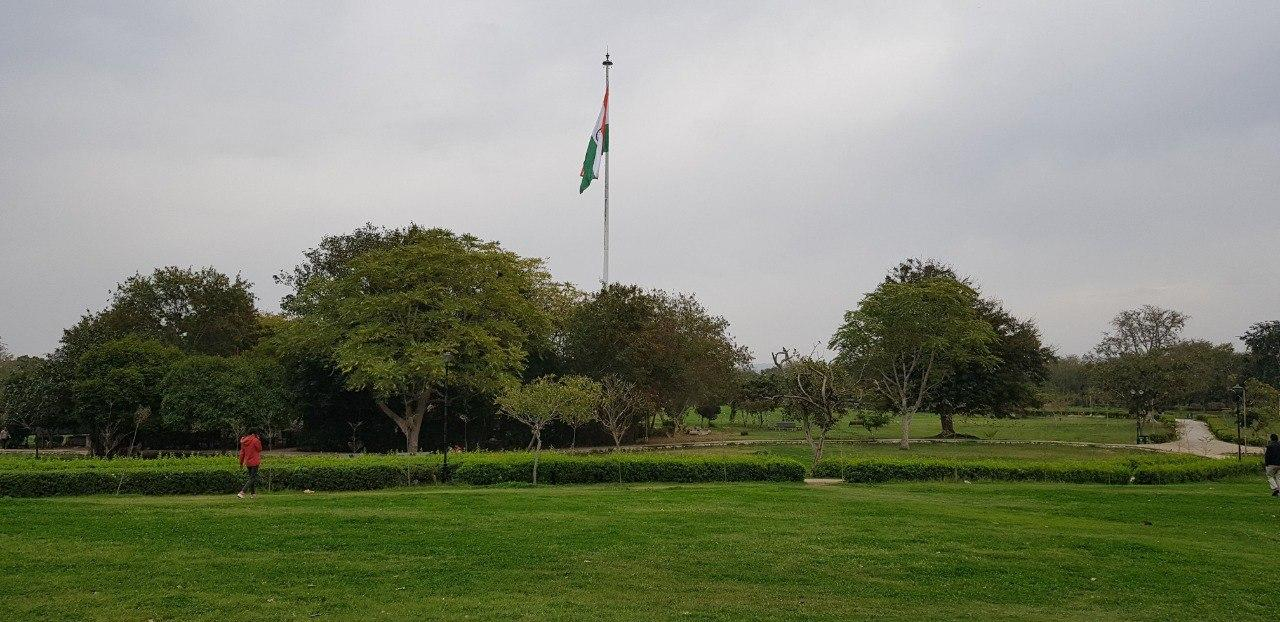
- A view of the main lawn at Central Park, Jaipur

- Location within Jaipur Location within Rajasthan
- Interactive map of Central Park, Jaipur
- Type: Urban public park
- Location: Prithviraj Road, Rambagh, Jaipur, Rajasthan, India – 302007
- Nearest city: Jaipur
- Coordinates: 26.904008°N 75.808915°E
- Area: 129 acres (52 ha)
- Created: 2006
- Operator: Jaipur Development Authority
- Visitors: Thousands daily
- Open: 5:00 AM – 9:00 PM IST
- Status: Open all year
- Designation: Largest park in Jaipur

Central Park, constructed by the Jaipur Development Authority is the largest park in Jaipur, India. It is located, as its name suggests, in the centre of Jaipur city. Having a large, lush green garden, as well as the nearby Rambagh Polo Ground and golf club, makes it an enjoyable place in Jaipur.

Central Park Garden also has a 4 kilometres (2.5 mi) long jogging and walking track. A number of migratory and native birds visit the park during the year.

Central park has a 269 feet (82 m) high first day and night monumental national flag with the flag of 28 feet (8.5 m) wide and 72 feet (22 m) in length. It is the largest tricolour in the country.

A musical fountain, a temple and stone statues are some of the attractions in the park.
