= Park Central, Gauteng =

Park Central
- Location within Gauteng Location within South Africa
- Coordinates: 26.218°S 28.038°E
- Country: South Africa
- Province: Gauteng
- Municipality: City of Johannesburg
- Established: 1955

Area
  - Total: 0.31 km^{2} (0.12 sq mi)

Population (2001)
  - Total: 84
  - Density: 270/km^{2} (700/sq mi)

Racial makeup (2001)
  - Black African: 89.3%
  - Coloured: 10.7%

First languages (2001)
  - Northern Sotho: 28.6%
  - Zulu: 21.4%
  - Tswana: 17.9%
  - Xhosa: 10.7%
  - Other: 21.4%
- Time zone: UTC+2 (SAST)
- Postal code (street): 2001

Park Central is a suburb of Johannesburg, South Africa. It is located in Region F of the City of Johannesburg Metropolitan Municipality.

== History ==
The suburb is situated on part of an old Witwatersrand farm called Turffontein. Established on the old slime dumps of the Ferreira Gold Mine, it became a suburb in May 1955. It was named after Central Park, New York, at one time was also waste ground. Prior to its reclamation in 2009, the main mine dump was the location of the old Top Star Drive-In.
