= Central Park (Ottawa) =

Park in The Glebe, Ottawa, Canada

Coordinates: 45.406736°N 75.690565°W

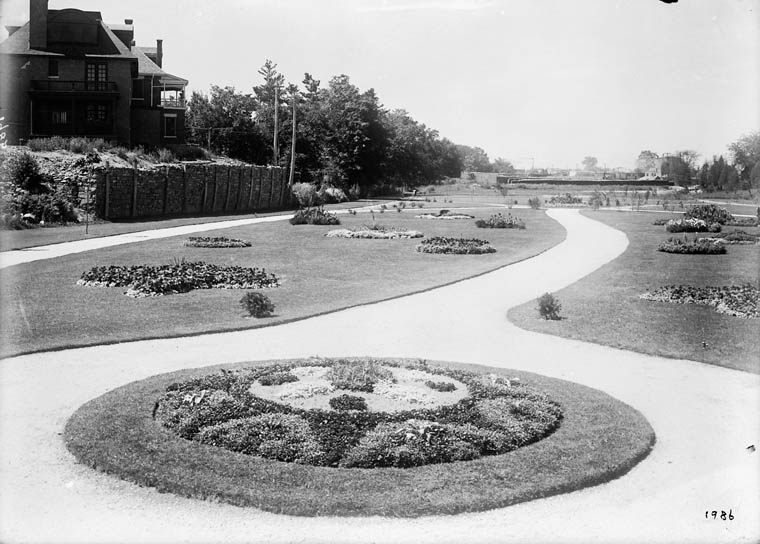
The western half of the park in 1911.

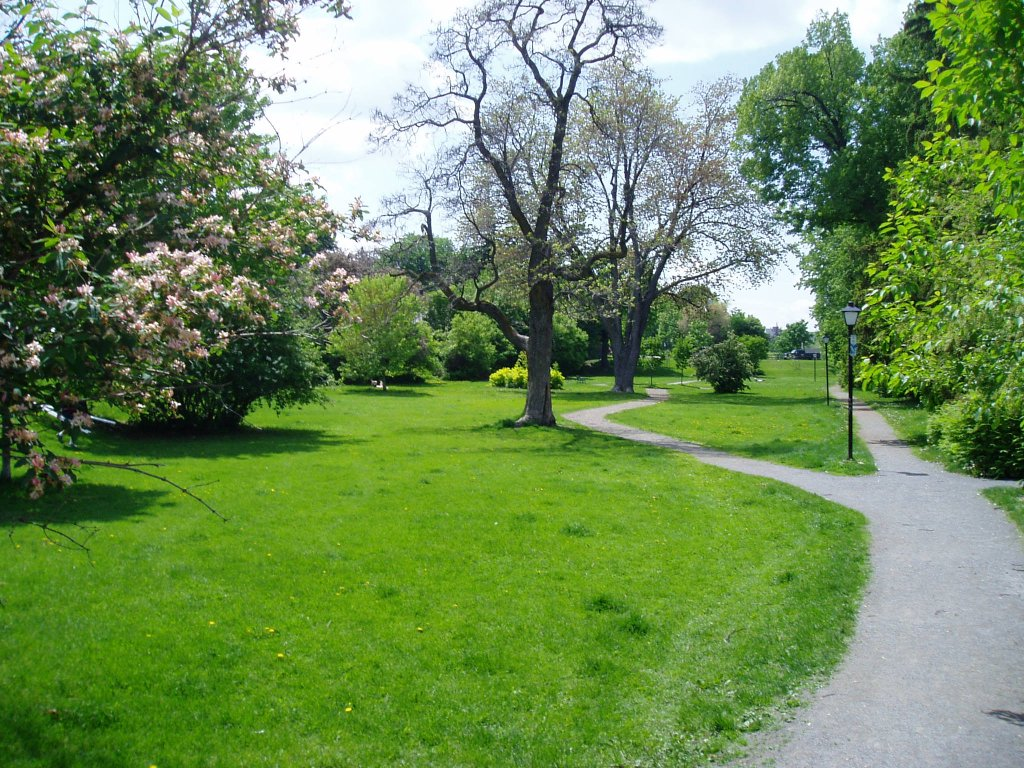
A portion of Central Park East.

Central Park is a park in The Glebe neighbourhood in central Ottawa, Ontario, Canada.

The park has two sections, Central Park East and West divided by Bank Street. To the southeast of the park is the landscaped area around Patterson Creek creating a continued stretch of greenery all the way to the Rideau Canal. Originally, the entire area of the park was that area around Patterson Creek. In the 1890s, work began on landscaping the area. Clemow Avenue was constructed, blocking the creek and creating the open space of the park. The work on the park was completed in 1907. In the 1960s, the city proposed extending Carling Avenue through the park to the canal. This caused an outcry in the community and led to the creation of the Glebe Community Association. Eventually, the plans were shelved.
