= Central Park (Almaty) =

Park in Almaty, Kazakhstan

- Central Recreation Park
- Орталық демалыс саябағы
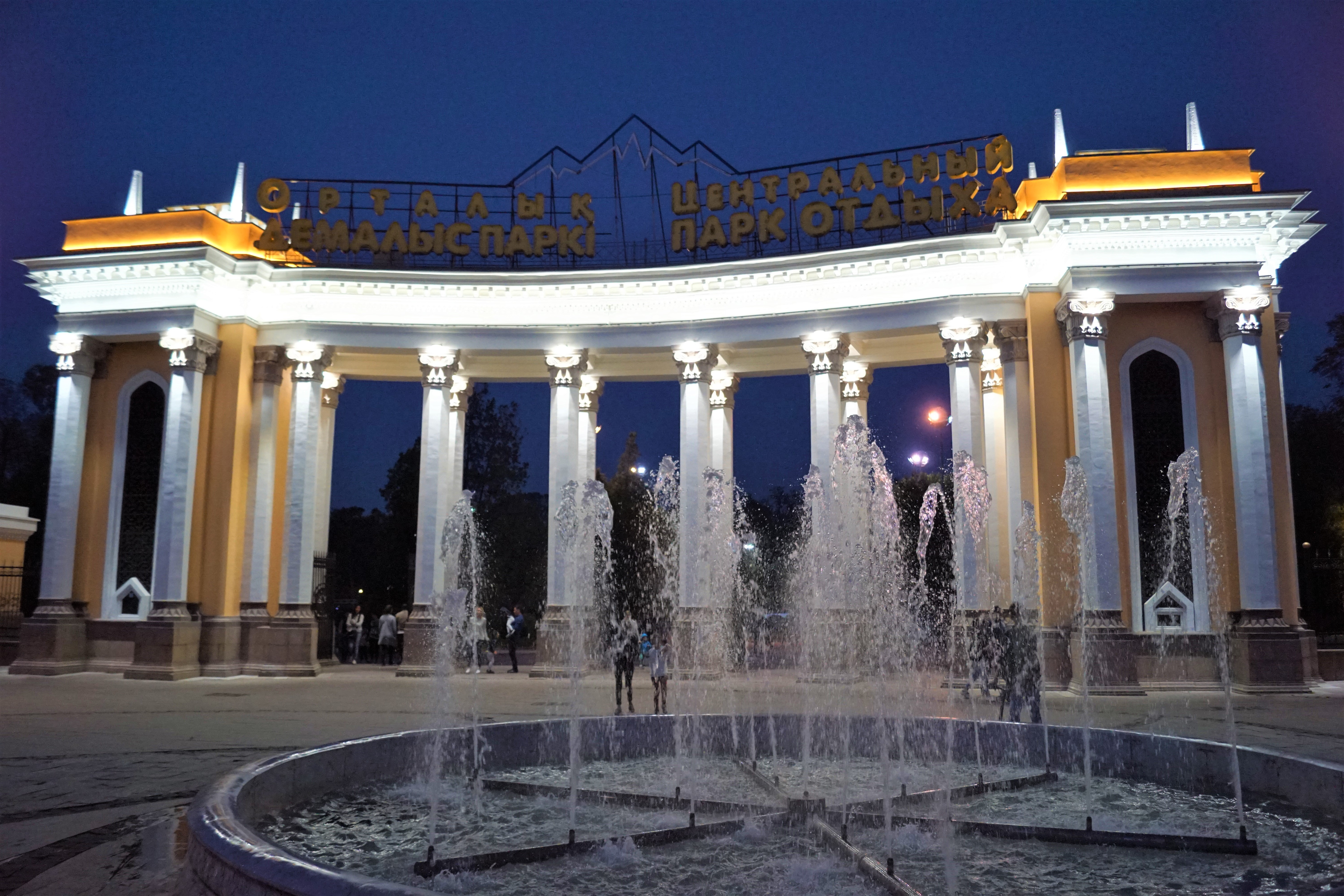
- Entrance gate of Central Leisure Park
- Interactive map of Central Park
- Type: Urban park
- Location: Almaty, Kazakhstan
- Coordinates: 43°15′45″N 76°58′07″E
- Area: 103 acres (42 ha)
- Established: 1856
- Founder: G. Krishtopenko
- Operator: Altyn-Taraz
- Website: almatycentralpark.kz

Central Recreation Park (Kazakh: Орталық демалыс саябағы, romanized: Ortalyq demalys saiabağy; Russian: Центральный парк отдыха, romanized: Tsentralnyy park otdykha), commonly known as Gorky Central Park of Culture and Recreation (Kazakh: Горький атындағы Орталық мәдениет және демалыс паркi; Russian: Центральный парк культуры и отдыха имени Горького) is an urban park located in the Medeu District of Almaty.

The park features a variety of trees, including elm, oak, aspen, maple, pine, spruce, poplar, and birch, along with artificial water reservoirs. Attractions include a water park, movie theater, sports complex, cultural venues, and public catering establishments. Child entertainment options include a children's railway, aqua park, and other recreational activities. By 2013, the park's area had shrunk to 42 hectares, a significant reduction from its 1983 size of over 100 hectares.

== History ==
=== Early history ===
The history of the Central Park dates back to the Russian establishment of civilian settlements around the fortification of Verny (now Almaty) and the rise of fisheries.

In 1856, scientist and gardener G. Krishtopenko laid the foundations for the park as a public garden in the floodplain of the Malaya Almatinka River, intended as a place of leisure for the officers of the Verny garrison. Drawing from his experience in Crimea, Krishtopenko planted the first deciduous and coniferous trees. He enlisted the help of Verny gardening enthusiasts like Kutaberdin, Sergeev, and Chvanov. After studying the local climate and soil, Krishtopenko determined that, in addition to Central Asian plants, species native to Central Russia could also thrive in the garden and the wider fortification. In 1868, seedlings and seeds were brought to Verny from the Nikitsky Botanical Garden and the Penza School of Horticulture in Tashkent.

=== Baum-Karlu period ===
Between 1869 and 1875, a greenhouse was constructed, flowerbeds were established, and a children's playground was created for educational purposes. Additionally, the Eduard Baum School of Horticulture was opened, accommodating 10–15 students. In 1874, Krishtopenko handed over the park leadership to Karl Baum, the brother of the renowned Verny forester Eduard Baum, and under his direction, the State Park (Russian: Государственный парк) became a hub for national celebrations. The State Garden's purpose expanded to include the cultivation of fruit, ornamental plants, vegetables, silk production, and the establishment of apiaries.

As the city grew, the park became a favored spot for relaxation among citizens. Buffets and kitchens were set up, along with dance floors, gazebos, yurts for billiards, and game tables. During Tsarist times, access to the park required an entrance fee.

=== Later history ===
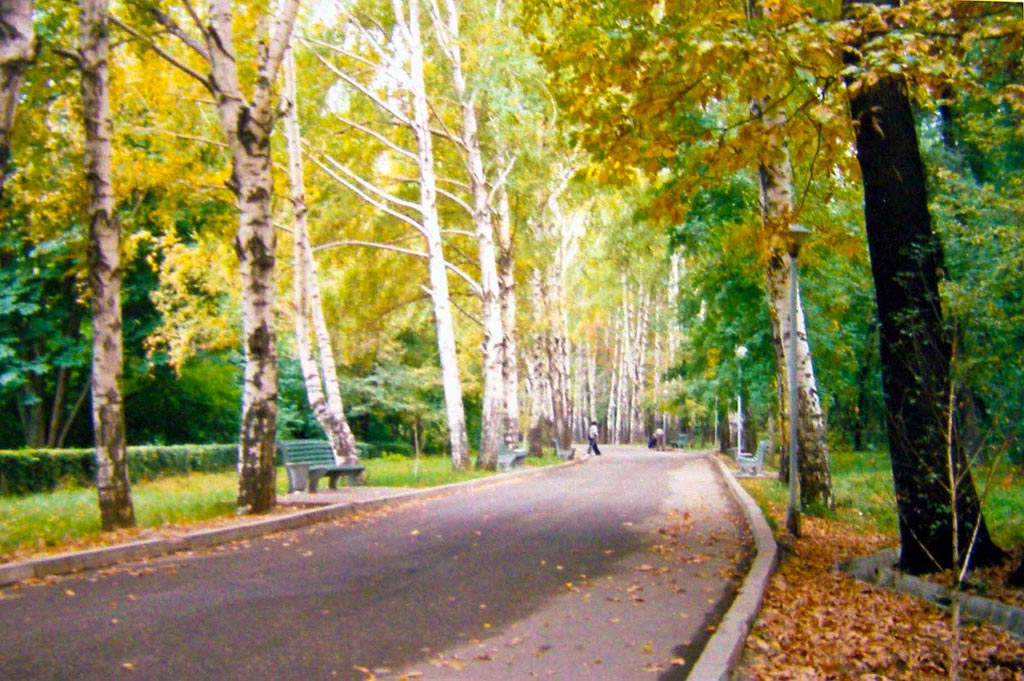
Birch alley in the park, 1988

During the Russian Revolution of 1905, laborers and youth organized rallies and gatherings in the park around the logs. In 1918, during the Russian Civil War, the park served as a defensive line for the Red Army. In 1919, the park hosted an aytysh (a traditional Kazakh verbal contest) with participants from the city of Aulie-Ata, now known as Taraz. In 2014, a street workout area was added to the park.

In 1934, the park underwent reconstruction, transforming into a recreational area for the workers of Alma-Ata. New attractions were installed, and an advanced irrigation and ditch system was created to cover the entire park. A zoo was also established in the eastern part on what used to be clover fields. In 1935, the park was renamed Maxim Gorky Park of Culture and Recreation (Kazakh: Горький атындағы Мәдениет және демалыс паркi; Russian: Парк культуры и отдыха имени Горького), and in 1940, a monument to Maxim Gorky was erected.

Since 1980, it has been known as Maxim Gorky Central Park of Culture and Recreation.

=== Privatization and recent history ===
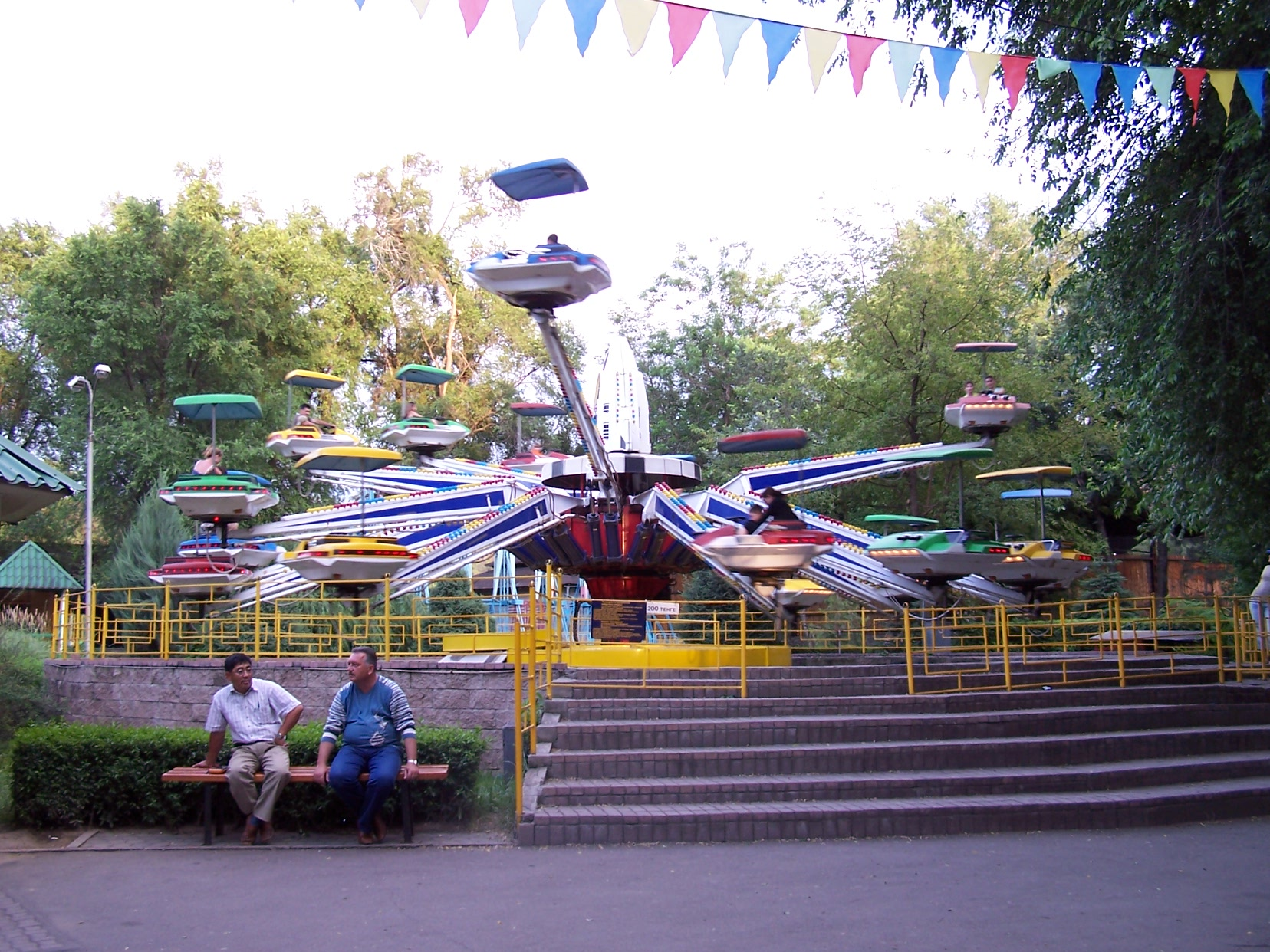
Amusement park venue, 2007

In 1997, a contract was signed between the Almaty City Akimat and the Altyn-Taraz Trade and Finance Company, granting the private management of the park for five years, with the option to purchase the park's property complex afterward. On 30 January 2004, following a sale and purchase agreement between TFC Altyn-Taraz LLP and the Almaty Territorial Committee of State Property and Privatization (which acted on behalf of the City Akimat), the Central Park's property complex was privatized and acquired by the TFC Altyn-Taraz. The ownership of the property was properly formalized and registered with the Almaty City Department of Justice.

After the park's territory became privately owned, the owners of the Aquapark, which was built on a small lake to maximize profits, drained the larger lake. The Balkhash-Alakol Department of Ecology officially confirmed that during the construction of a parking lot, TFC Altyn-Taraz management conducted unauthorized tree felling, cutting down 124 green plantings, causing environmental damage amounting to 1,029,730 tenge. A residential complex was erected on a significant portion of the park, despite its protected status under the Ministry of Agriculture’s water fund registry. As vehicles began driving through the park, it became increasingly unsafe for pedestrians. Additionally, due to the lack of proper irrigation and care, around 100 oak trees perished.

On 15 August 2013, trees began to be cut down in the park which over 2000 were planned. According to Erkebulan Orazalin, deputy head of the Almaty Department of Natural Resources, no permit had been obtained for logging and was carried out illegally. The irrigation ditch system is not currently operating in the park.

In 2018, the park was reconstructed. At the parking site, there are children's and street workout playgrounds, basketball and football fields, a rollerdrome and a skate track. Modern lighting, benches have been installed throughout the territory, idle fountains and an amphitheater have been updated. About 1.6 billion tenge of private funds were invested in the modernization of the park.
