= Pembroke Public Library =

Library in Pembroke, Ontario, Canada

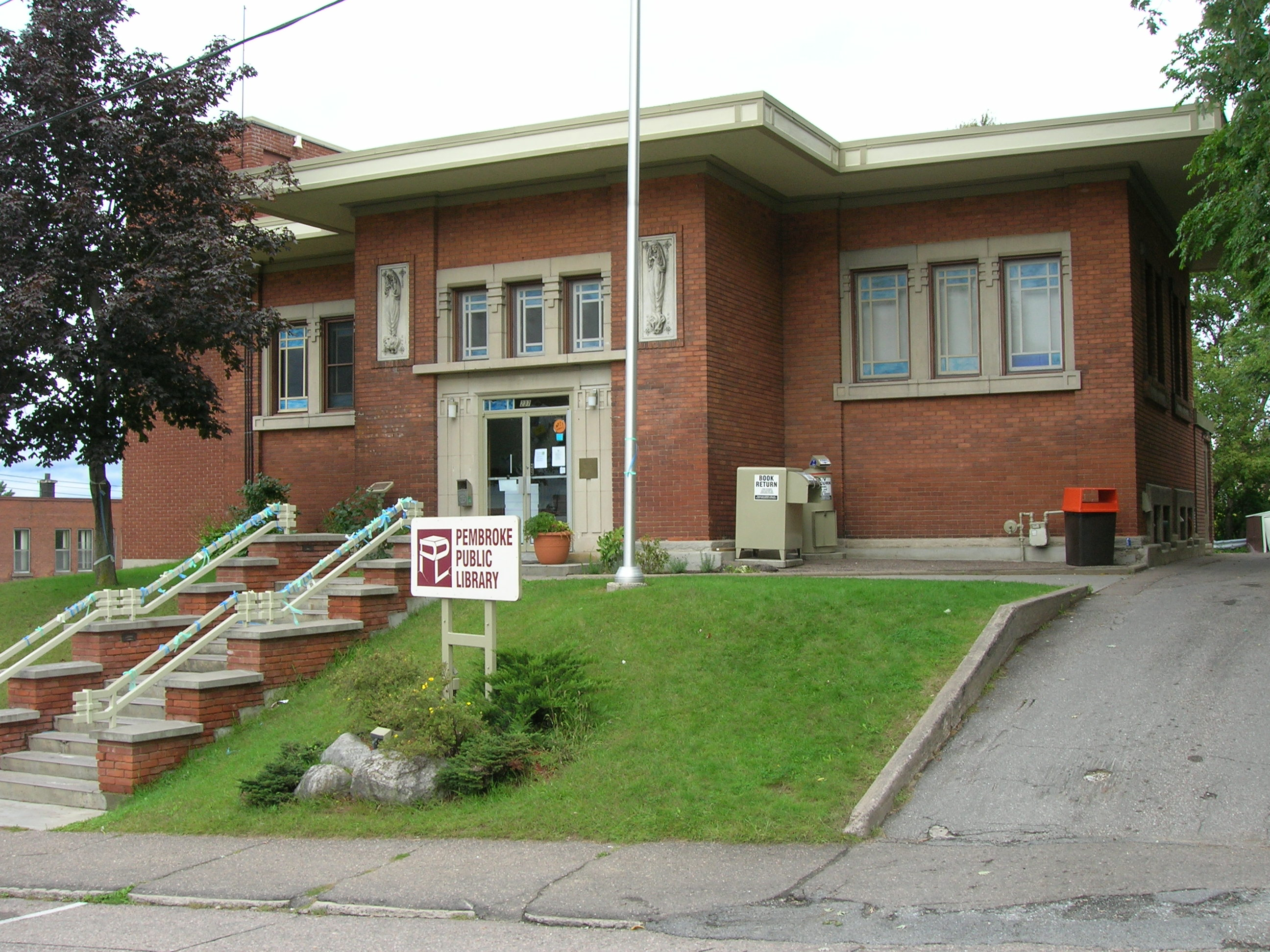
- The library in September 2006.
- 45°49′30.66″N 77°6′46.8″W
- Location: Pembroke, Ontario, Canada
- Branches: 1

Access and use
- Population served: 23,100

Other information
- Website: http://www.pembrokelibrary.ca

Pembroke Public Library
- Interactive map of the Pembroke Public Library area
- Alternative names: Pembroke Carnegie Library

General information
- Architectural style: Prairie Style
- Location: Pembroke, Ontario, 237 Victoria St.
- Coordinates: 45°49′30.66″N 77°6′46.8″W
- Completed: 1931

Design and construction
- Architect: Francis Sullivan

The Pembroke Public Library is a single-branch public library in Pembroke, Ontario, Canada.

== Services ==
The Pembroke Public Library offers many useful services to the city of Pembroke and its surrounding area. Some of these services include:

- A comprehensive online catalogue search
- Inter-library loans, which can be requested in person or online, if the library does not have the item you require
- Personalized delivery to those who are homebound
- The ability to renew materials in person, online, or by phone
- The ability to make genealogical requests, in person or online
- Links to homework help online for teens
- Various services for teachers, parents/home schooling, and newcomers
- Non-resident memberships

=== Programming and Events ===
Besides these services, the Pembroke Public Library has a considerable amount of programming and events available to the community. Some programming is for everyone, such as the gardening and healthy cooking club, and some programs are targeted for adults and for children separately. Programs for adults include four different book clubs and a writer's club. Programs for children include a Lego Club, Nintendo Wii available to play every second Saturday, many various seasonal programs, and two children's book clubs. Library tours are available for school classes as well. See the library's website for complete details on the many events happening each month.

== Building ==
The current building was designed by Francis Sullivan, a contemporary of Frank Lloyd Wright. The building was designated under Part 4 of the Ontario Heritage Act in 1991.

== History ==
The library is a Carnegie library, having received a grant of $14,000 from the Carnegie Foundation on December 24, 1907.

Subhash Mehta was the chief librarian of the Pembroke Public Library from 1970 to 2002. The Subhash Mehta Memorial Reading Room is now dedicated to his memory.

== See also ==
- List of Carnegie libraries in Canada
