= Central Park, Kharghar =

Park in Navi Mumbai, India

Coordinates: 19.057342°N 73.067408°E

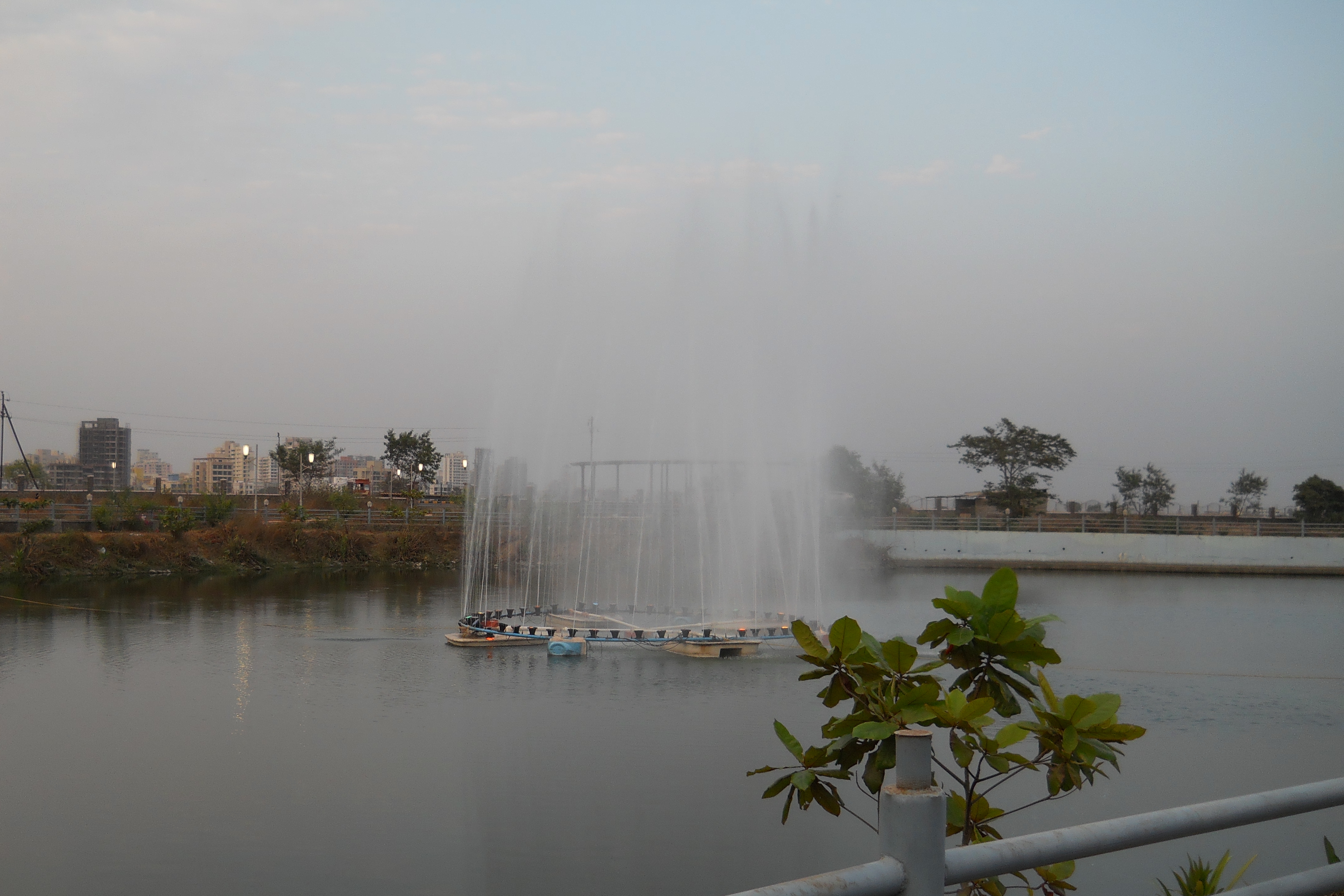
Fountain in Artificial Pond in Central Park

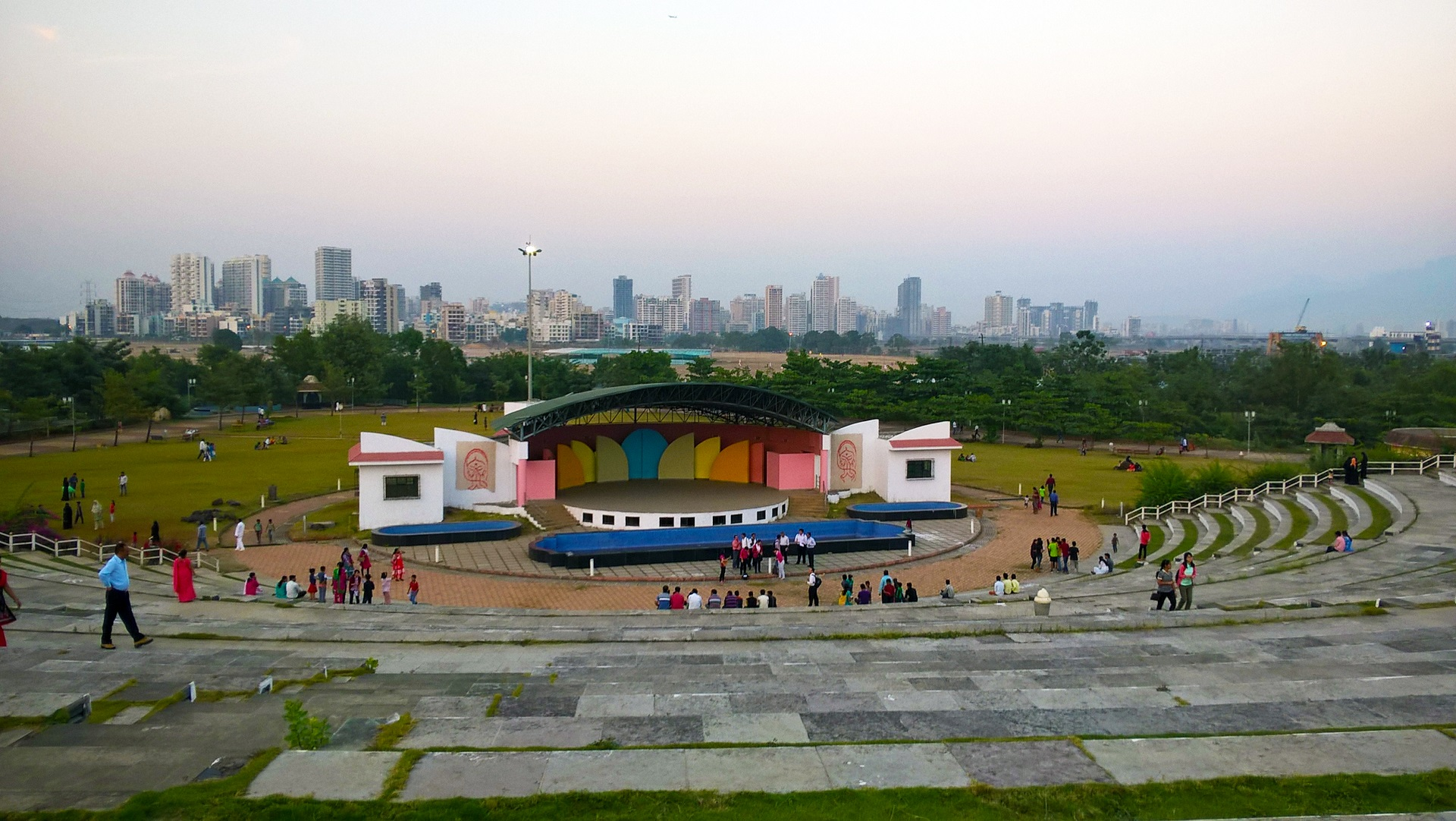
View from Central Park

The Central Park of Kharghar is an urban park in Navi Mumbai, India that covers an area of around 119 hectares (290 acres) spread across the city's sectors 23,24 and 25.

== Overview ==
Open to the public since 2010, it includes theme parks, morning walk-trails, jogging tracks, watersports, cricket and football grounds, sports clubs, botanical gardens, amphitheaters along with active and passive recreation areas. The main walking track is of 1.5 kilometers length. It is expected to be one of the largest gardens in Asia when fully developed.

It is near to Sector 20, Jalvayu Vihar, and opposite the well known Pandavkada cave and waterfall. An 18-hole golf course is also open to the public. As per CIDCO it will be largest park in Asia and third largest in the world. It also houses many dance sculptures, musical sculptures, and was rated one of the most 'Beautiful Gardens of The World', more beautiful than Lodhi Gardens in New Delhi. There are more than 1000 picnic places for families. The park is open from 6 am to 9 am and from 5 pm to 8 pm. It is 4 km far from Kharghar Railway Station.

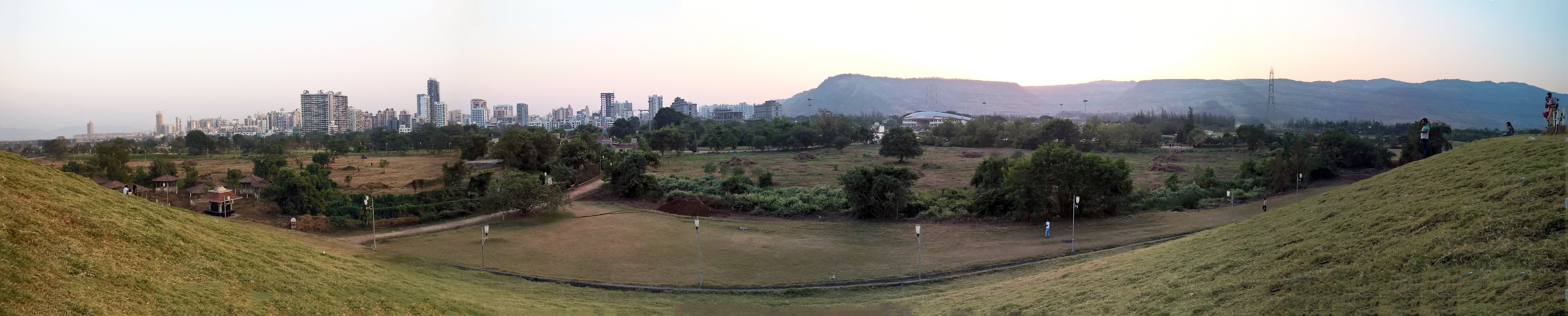
Panoramic view from the Central Park
