= Park Central Building =

Office building in Los Angeles, California, United States

- Location within the Los Angeles metropolitan area
- Alternative names: PCB; Detwiler Building

General information
- Status: Completed
- Type: Commercial offices
- Location: 412 West Sixth Street; Los Angeles, California
- Coordinates: 34.0475°N 118.2537°W
- Completed: 1916

Height
- Roof: 62 m (203 ft)

Technical details
- Floor count: 14

Design and construction
- Architect: John C. Austin

The Park Central Building (also known as the Detwiler Building) is a high-rise office building located at 412 West Sixth Street in Los Angeles, California.
