= Central Park, Peterborough =

Park in Peterborough, England

Central Park
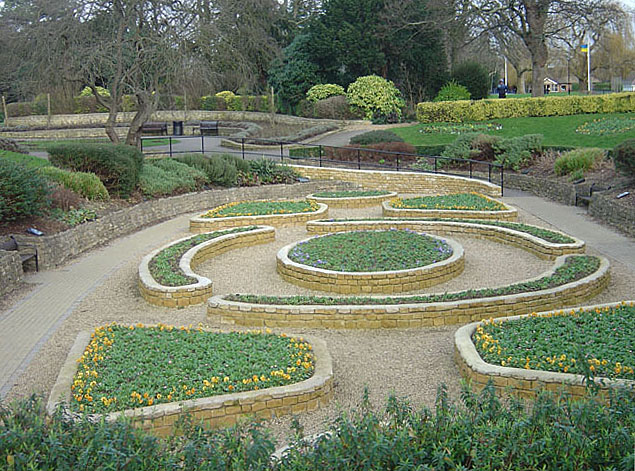
- Sunken Garden in Central Park
- Interactive map of Central Park
- Type: public
- Location: Peterborough, Cambridgeshire, UK
- Coordinates: 52°35′03″N 0°14′7″W
- Operator: Peterborough City Council
- Awards: Green Flag

Central Park is a Green Flag-awarded public park in Peterborough, Cambridgeshire, north of the city centre.

Attractions include a paddling pool, sandpit, tennis courts, formal gardens, an aviary, bowling greens, a croquet lawn and a café.

Various shows are held throughout the year, including dog shows and a Viking heritage day.

== History ==
The Peterborough Land Company sought investors to purchase 333 acres (134.8 hectares) of land to the north of the city in 1875. The land was to be developed for model housing, with a park planned at the centre. When the partially complete park was opened at Easter 1877, admittance was by subscription only. It remained relatively unchanged until 1908, when Peterborough City Council took over responsibility for the site on a 999 year lease.

The stone archway entrance from Broadway was presented to the City Council by the Great Northern Railway in 1913. It was formerly situated at the Crescent, a row of Georgian houses near the railway station that were demolished to make way for the Crescent Bridge.

The Park conservation area was designated in 1988. The conservation area is principally housing but also includes commercial uses, shops, and churches.
