= Central Park metro station (Taiwan) =

Metro station in Kaohsiung, Taiwan

Central Park R9 中央公園
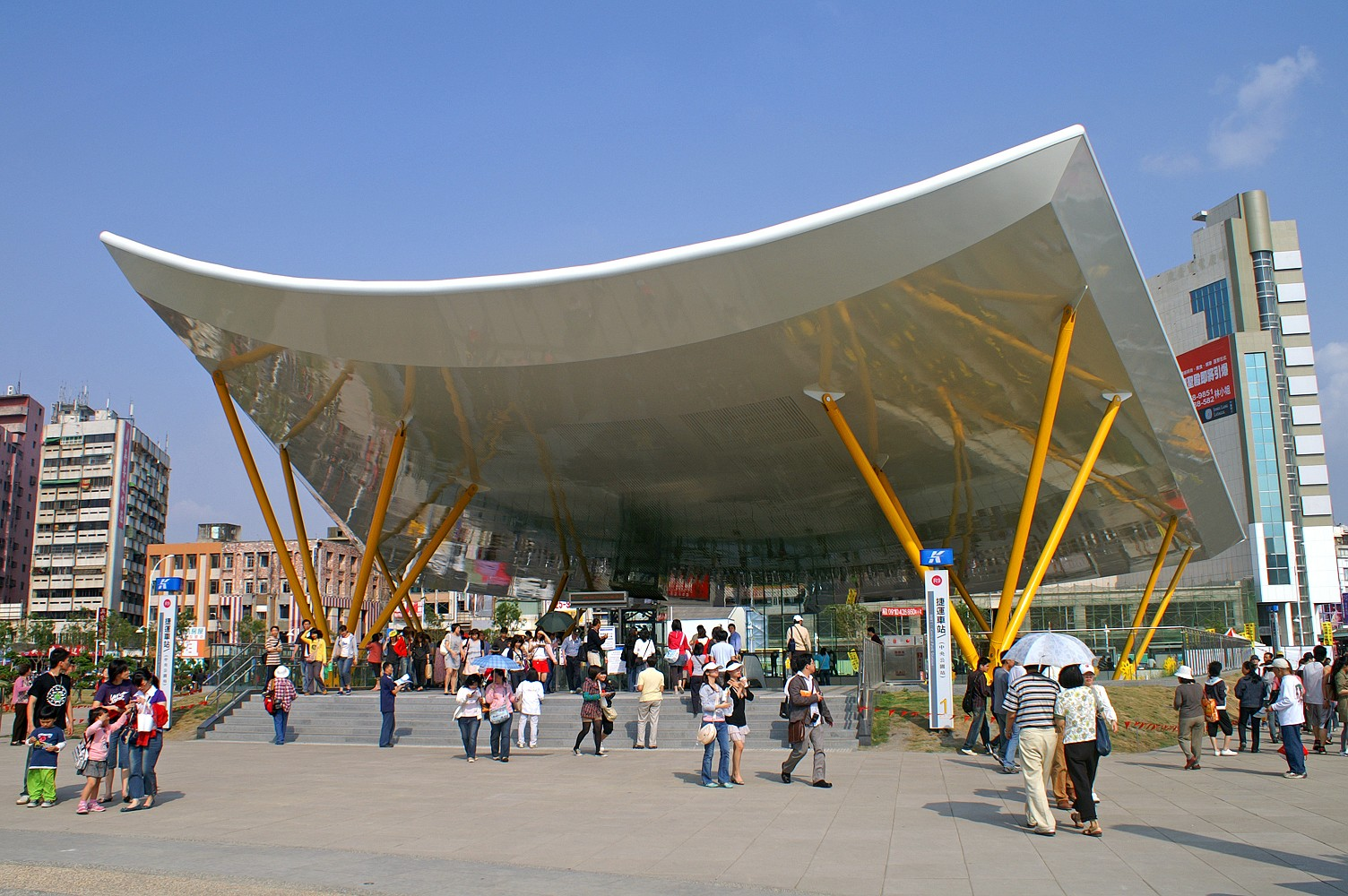
- Central Park station

Chinese name
- Traditional Chinese: 中央公園站
- Simplified Chinese: 中央公园站
Transcriptions
Standard Mandarin
- Hanyu Pinyin: Zhōngyāng Gōngyuán Chēzhàn
- Bopomofo: ㄓㄨㄥ 一ㄤ ㄍㄨㄥ ㄩㄢˊ ㄔㄜ ㄓㄢˋ
- Wade–Giles: Chung^{1}-yang^{1} Kung^{1}yuan^{2} Ch'ê^{1}-chan^{4}
- Tongyong Pinyin: Jhōngyang Gōngyuán Chējhàn
Southern Min
- Tâi-lô: Tiong-iang Kong-hn̂g Tsām

General information
- Location: Sinsing, Kaohsiung; Taiwan
- Coordinates: 22°37′29″N 120°18′4.7″E
- Operated by: Kaohsiung Rapid Transit Corporation
- Line: Red line (R9)
- Platforms: One island platform

Construction
- Structure type: Underground

History
- Opened: 9 March 2008; 18 years ago

Passengers
- daily (Jan. 2011)

Services
Preceding station	Kaohsiung Metro	Following station
Formosa Boulevard towards Gangshan	Red line	Sanduo Shopping District towards Siaogang
Location

Central Park is a station on the Red line of Kaohsiung MRT in Sinsing District, Kaohsiung, Taiwan. The station is named after the nearby Central Park.

== Station overview ==
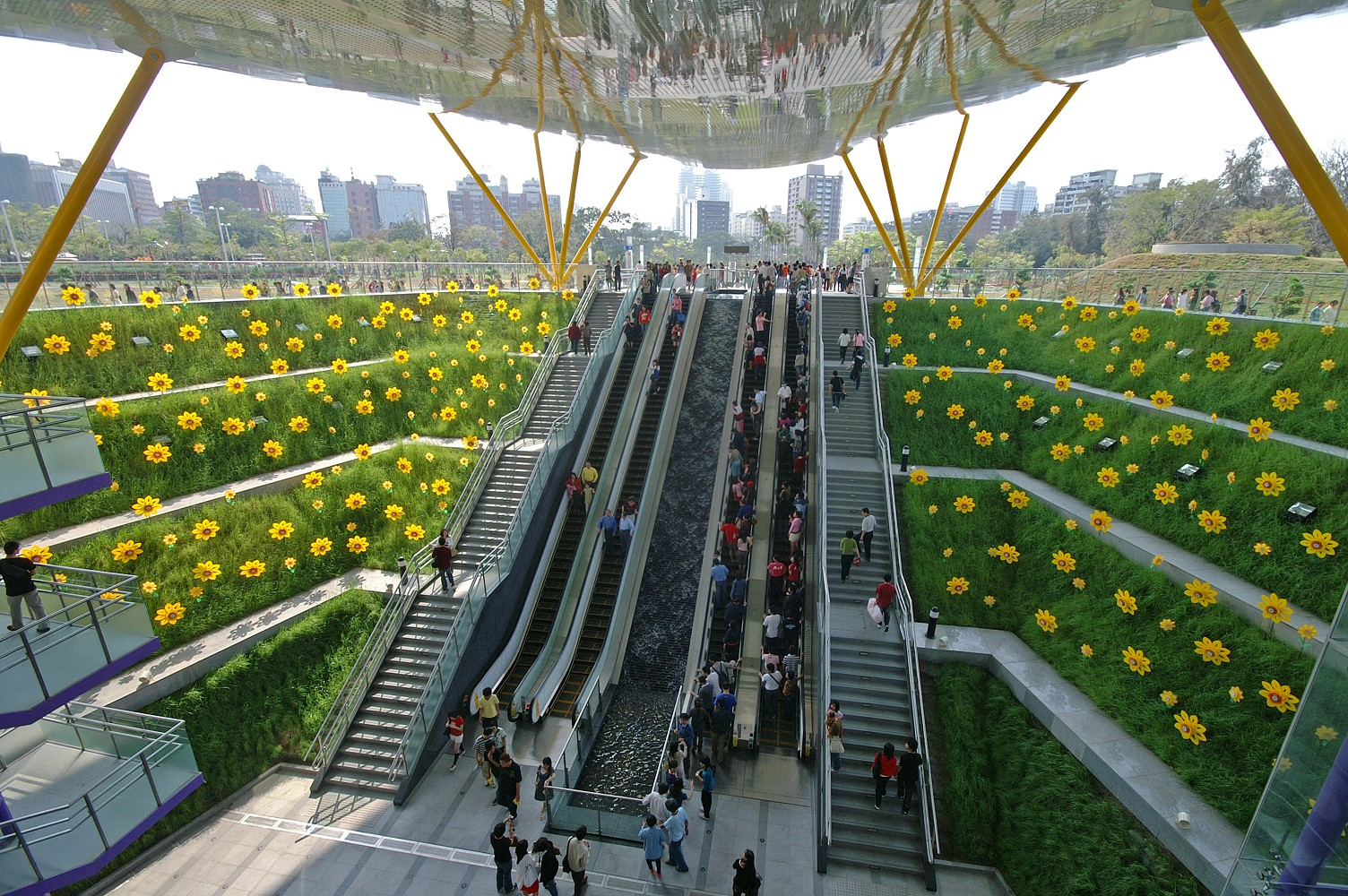
Central Park station courtyard

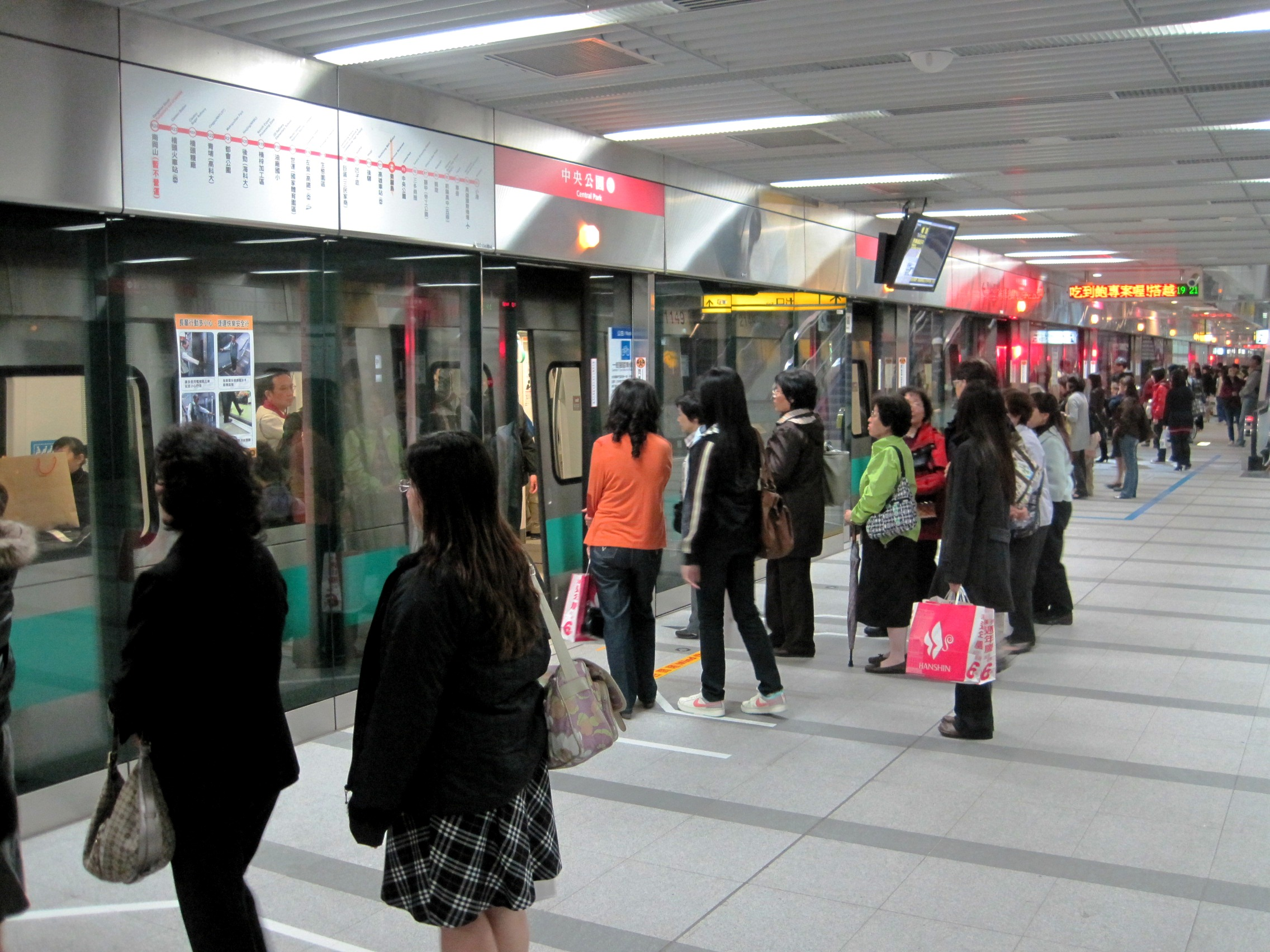
Central Park station platform

The station is a two-level, underground station with an island platform and three exits. It is 197 meters long and is located at the intersections of Zhongshan 1st Rd., Minsheng 2nd Rd., and Wufu 3rd Rd.

It was originally planned to be named "Shinkuchan Station", but this was later changed to its current name. The station was designed by British architect Richard Rogers. Windmill-shaped flowers cover the courtyard grass areas.

== Around the station ==
- Central Park
- Holy Rosary Cathedral
- Urban Spotlight Arcade
- Shinkuchan
- Talee's Department Store
- Star Place Department Store
- Datong Department Store (Wufu Branch)
- Sinsing High School
- Sinsing Elementary School
- Datong Elementary School
- Datong Hospital
