= Central Park (Kaohsiung) =

Park in Qianjin, Kaohsiung, Taiwan

- 中央公園
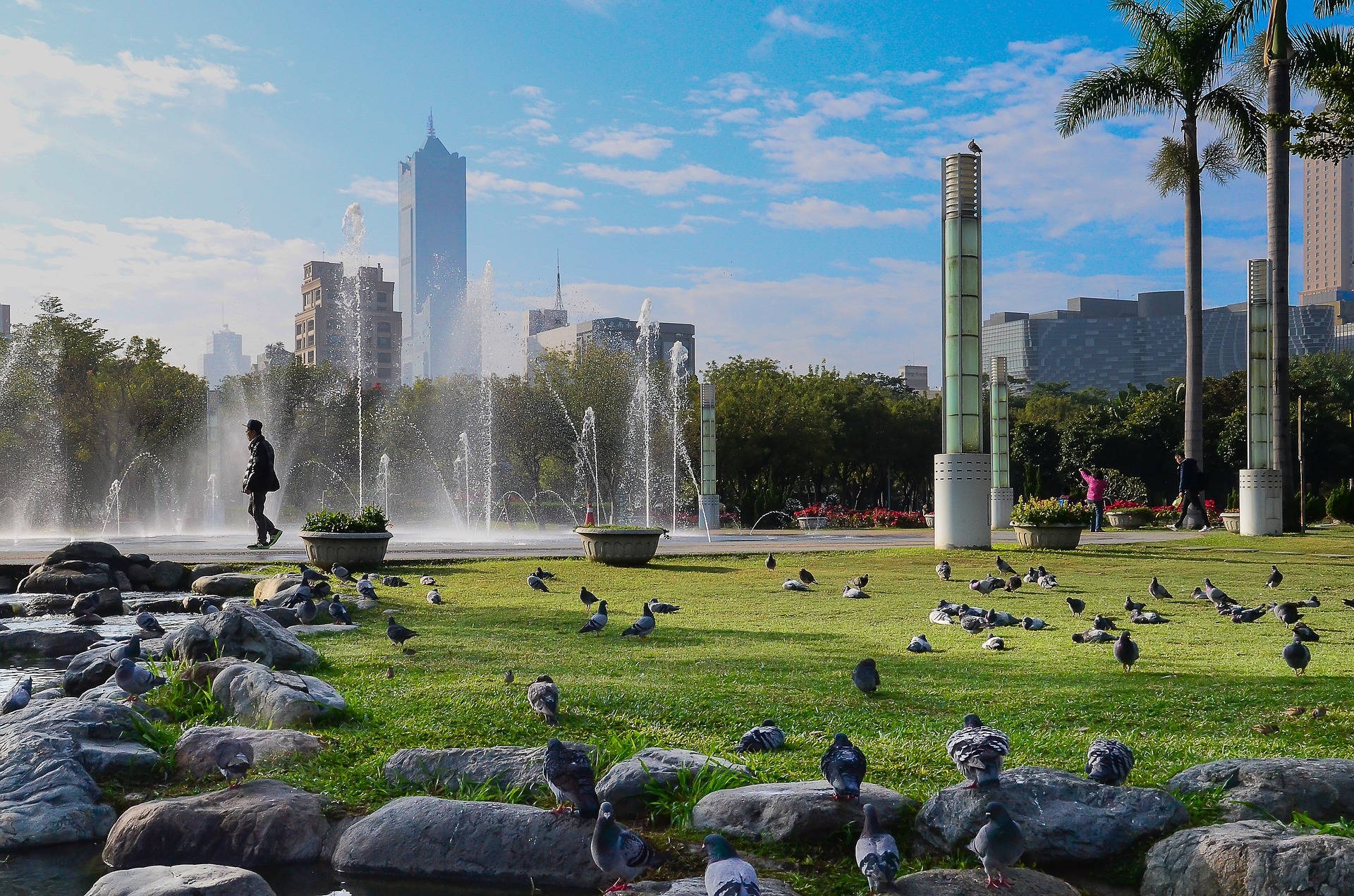
- Interactive map of Central Park
- Type: park
- Location: Cianjin, Kaohsiung, Taiwan
- Coordinates: 22.624943°N 120.299250°E
- Opened: 1976
- Public transit: Central Park Station

Central Park (traditional Chinese: 中央公園; simplified Chinese: 中央公园; pinyin: Zhōngyāng Gōngyuán; Pe̍h-ōe-jī: Tiong-iong Kong-hn̂g) is a park in Cianjin District, Kaohsiung, Taiwan. The park is an oasis of greenery in the midst of a heavily built-up urban area.

== History ==
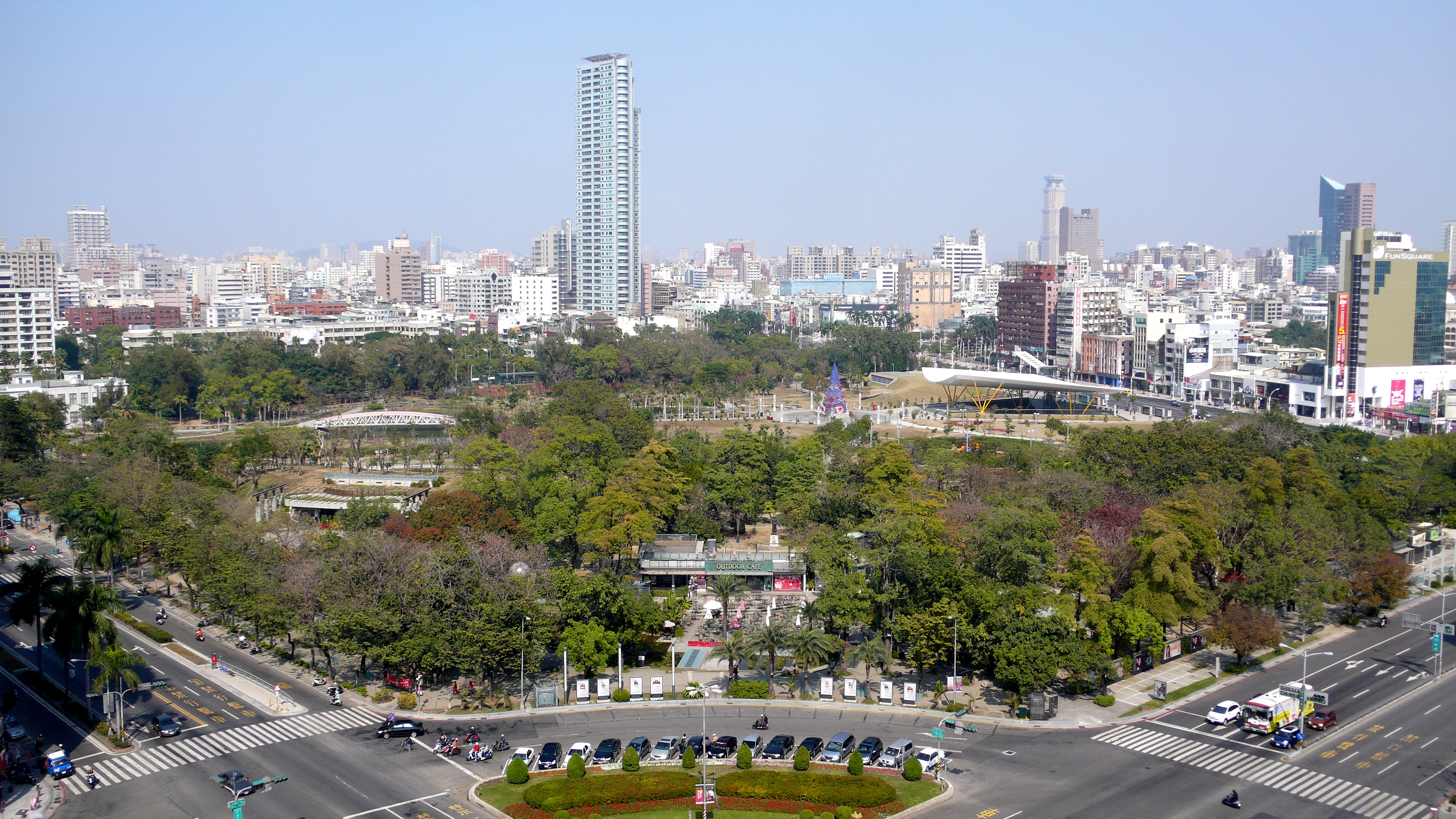
Kaohsiung Central Park in 2009

City planners first conceived of, and set aside space for, a park at Central Park's current location during the period when Taiwan was under Japanese rule. Later on, planners during the early period of Republic of China rule referred to the concept as Park Number 15.

Central Park formally came into being in 1976. At one point, the park featured a library, basketball courts, tennis courts, a parking lot, the District swimming pool, and Sun Yat-sen Arena. The park was adopted by the Rotary Club and thus also became known as Rotary Park.

In the 1990s, most of the built-up areas were removed and replaced with grassy or wooded parkland. This was the result of the efforts of environmentalist groups, and dovetailed with the construction of the MRT Red Line. The Kaohsiung Rapid Transit Corporation footed the bill for the conversion.

In February 2014, it came to light that city officials had privately come to an agreement with a charitable organization founded on behalf of a deceased lumber tycoon to pave over a wooded area at the northwest corner of Central Park and erect a public library bearing the name of said individual. A wide array of local citizens have arisen to oppose the proposed partial paving over of Central Park.

== Features ==
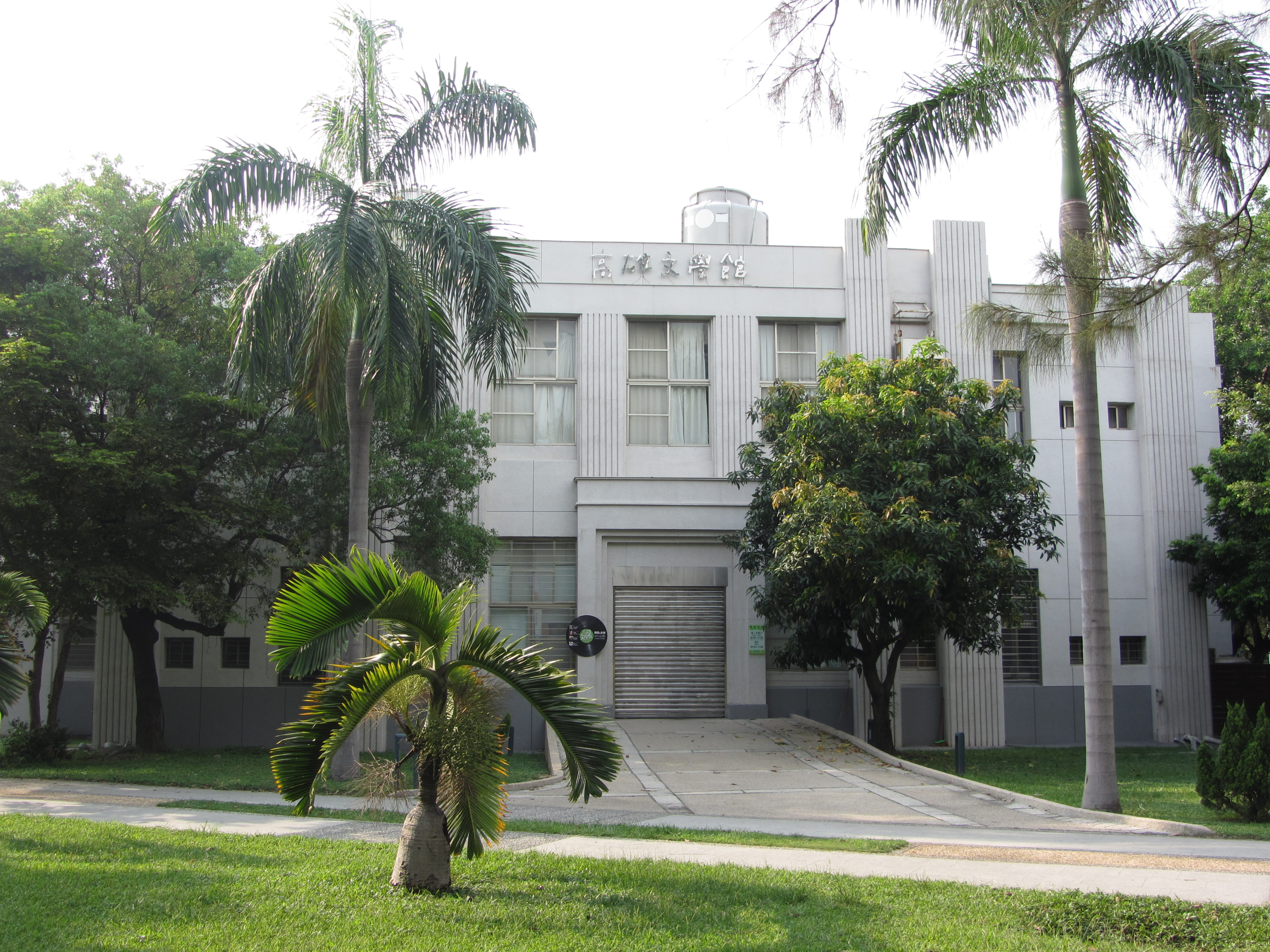
Kaohsiung Literature Library

Central Park includes Kaohsiung Literature Library, Scenic Lake, Middle Island, Speech Square, Water Square, Hedgerow Labyrinth and Outdoor Terrace. Water Square offers 20-minute-long "water dances" several times a day.

== Transportation ==
The park is accessible from Central Park Station of Kaohsiung MRT. The main exit of the station is located at the east edge of the park.

== See also ==
- List of parks in Taiwan
