= List of designated heritage properties in Ottawa =

This is a list of properties which have been designated by the City of Ottawa under Part IV of the Ontario Heritage Act as having cultural heritage value or interest. At many properties, a bronze plaque gives a bilingual description of the property's history.

Property	Address	Ward	Construction Date	Architect	Photo
101 Rideau	101 Rideau Street	Rideau-Vanier	c. 1871		
108 Acacia	108 Acacia Avenue	Rideau-Rockcliffe	1908	Francis Sullivan	
1119 Wellington West	1119 Wellington Street West	Kitchissippi	c. 1881		
1134 O'Grady	1134 O'Grady Street	Rideau-Jock	1870–1875		
1137 Mill	1137 Mill Street	Rideau-Jock	c. 1880		
126 Rideau	126 Rideau Street	Rideau-Vanier	1906–07	W.E. Noffke	
151 Stanley	151 Stanley Avenue	Rideau-Rockcliffe	1868		
154 Britannia	154 Britannia Road	Bay	c. 1895	Charles Robinson	
156-158 Sparks	156-158 Sparks Street	Somerset	1871–72		
158-160 Guigues	158-160 Guigues	Rideau-Vanier	1846		
163-165 Bolton	163, 165 Bolton Street	Rideau-Vanier	1879		
17 Mariposa	17 Mariposa Avenue	Rideau-Rockcliffe	c. 1909	Probably Thomas Coltrin Keefer	
175 Britannia	175 Britannia Road	Bay	c. 1908	Edward & Albert Murphy	
176 Bronson	176 Bronson Avenue	Somerset	Prior to 1874		
1820 St. Joseph	1820 St. Joseph Boulevard	Orléans West-Innes			
190 Bronson	190 Bronson Avenue	Somerset	1889		
224 Cooper	224 Cooper Street	Somerset	1884		
240 Daly	240 Daly Avenue	Rideau-Vanier			
243 Augusta	243 Augusta Street	Rideau-Vanier	1866		
25-29 Crichton	25, 29 Crichton Street	Rideau-Rockcliffe	c. 1867		
260 Sunnyside	260 Sunnyside Avenue	Capital	1921	W.E. Noffke	
261 O'Connor	261 O'Connor Street	Somerset			
273 Wilbrod	273 Wilbrod Street	Rideau-Vanier	1892–1893		
295 Lorne Greene	295 Lorne Greene Way	Bay	c. 1913		
301 Metcalfe	301 Metcalfe Street	Somerset		Frederick J. Alexander	
310 Cooper	310 Cooper Street	Somerset	1879–80		
315 Daly	315 Daly Avenue	Rideau-Vanier	before 1861		
333 Laurier	333 Laurier Avenue West	Somerset	1890–91		
339 Pleasant Park	339 Pleasant Park Road	Alta Vista	1965	James W. Strutt	
350-352 Cumberland	350-352 Cumberland	Rideau-Vanier	c. 1860		
408 Queen	408 Queen Street	Somerset	1899		
46 Cartier	46 Cartier Street	Somerset	1901		
478 Albert	478 Albert Street	Somerset	c. 1874	Thomas Seaton Scott (likely)	
48 Britannia	48 Britannia Road	Bay	c. 1863		
494 Albert	494 & 504 Albert Street	Somerset	c. 1864		
5 Blackburn	5 Blackburn Avenue	Rideau-Vanier	1905		
541 Manor	541 Manor Avenue	Rideau-Rockcliffe	1900s		
5538 Manotick Main	5538 Manotick Main Street	Rideau-Jock			
5562 Manotick Main	5562 Manotick Main Street	Rideau-Jock			
6 McLeod	6 McLeod Street	Somerset	1907–08	Weeks and Keefer	
7 Delaware	7 Delaware	Somerset	1907	W.E. Noffke	
84 Stewart	84 Stewart Street	Rideau-Vanier	Prior to 1874		
89 Murray	89 Murray Street	Rideau-Vanier	1876		
89 Rideau	89 Rideau Street	Rideau-Vanier	Prob. 1910		
Abbotsford House	950 Bank Street	Capital	c. 1872		
Aberdeen Pavilion		Capital	1898	Moses C. Edey	
Adams House	29 Somerset Street West	Somerset	Approx. 1888		
Albion Hotel	1 Daly Avenue	Rideau-Vanier	1871		
Alexander Fleck House	593 Laurier Avenue West	Somerset	1902		
Allan House (Sandy Hill)	192 Daly Avenue	Rideau-Vanier	1893–94		
Allan House (New Edinburgh)	35 MacKay Street	Rideau-Rockcliffe	Probably 1864–65		
All Saints' Anglican Church	317 Chapel Street	Rideau-Vanier	1899–1900	A.M. Calderon	
Ambassador Court	612 Bank Street	Capital		Werner Noffke	
Andrew Wilson House / Hayes House	4971 Dunning Road	Orléans South-Navan	Prior to 1899		
Arbour House	84 Bradford Street	Bay	1892–93		
Archbisop's Palace	145 St. Patrick Street	Rideau-Vanier	1849		
Armstrong House	35 Armstrong Street	Kitchissippi	c. 1845		
Ashton General Store	8981 Flewellyn Road	Rideau-Jock	1879	John Summer	
Ayers Building	1128 Mill Street	Rideau-Jock	1902		
Aylen-Heney Cottage	150 Richmond Road	Kitchissippi	1830s		
Bank of Montreal	294 Bank Street	Somerset	1908–1909	Keefer and Weekes	
Bank of Nova Scotia Building	125 Sparks Street	Somerset	1924–25	John Lyle	
Bayne House	40 Fuller Street	Kitchissippi	1828	William Ross	
Beattie House	451 Besserer Street	Rideau-Vanier	1867		
Bell Block	32-36 Elgin Street	Somerset	1867	William Hodgson	
Bells Corners Union Cemetery	3851 Old Richmond Road	College	1853		
Besserer House	149 Daly Avenue	Rideau-Vanier	1844		
Bethany Hope Centre	1140 Wellington Street West	Kitchissippi	1924	Horwood and Taylor	
Bingham-McKellar House	635 Richmond Road	Bay	1840s	J. and William Thomson	
Birkett House	306 Metcalfe Street	Somerset	1896		
Billings Estate	2100 Cabot Street	Alta Vista	1828		
Booth Barn Complex	930 Carling Avenue	River	1867–1890		
Booth House / Laurentian Club	252 Metcalfe Street	Somerset	1909	John H. W. Watts	
Booth Street Complex	552 Booth Street	Somerset	1909–1952	W.E. Noffke	
Borbridge Building	54-60 York Street	Rideau-Vanier	1875	William Hodgson	
Bower House	3 Bower Street	Capital	1866–67	J. C. Bower	
Boyd House	173 Huntmar Drive	Stittsville	1887		
Braclyn House	3229 Diamondview Road	West Carleton-March	1858		
Bradley/Craig Homestead	590 Hazeldean Road	Kanata South	1870s		
Bradley House	4 Bradley Farm Court	Kanata South	1903		
Brantwood Place Gates	Main Street (at Beckwith Road)	Capital	1912		
Broadview Public School	590 Broadview Avenue	Kitchissippi	1927	Richards and Abra	
Brown Tenements	153-161 York Street	Rideau-Vanier	c. 1865-1875		
Brûlé House	288 St. Patrick Street	Rideau-Vanier	c. 1842	Thomas Brûlé	
Bryan House	6700 Rideau Valley Drive South	Rideau-Jock			
Building A, Physical Metallurgy Laboratory	552 Booth Street	Somerset	1942–1952		
Building B, Physical Metallurgy Laboratory	552 Booth Street	Somerset	1942–1952		
Building E, Physical Metallurgy Laboratory	552 Booth Street	Somerset	1942–1952		
Building F, Central Heating Plant	552 Booth Street	Somerset	1945		
Building G, Fuel Research Laboratories	552 Booth Street	Somerset			
Building H, Fuel Research Laboratories	552 Booth Street	Somerset			
Building M, Ore Dressing and Metallurgical Laboratories	552 Booth Street	Somerset	1932		
Building N1, Fuel Testing Building	552 Booth Street	Somerset	1911		
Building N2, Hydro-metallurgical Laboratory	552 Booth Street	Somerset	1929		
Building N3, Pyre-metallurgical Laboratory	552 Booth Street	Somerset	1929		
Building Q, Ore Dressing Laboratory	552 Booth Street	Somerset			
Building R, Industrial Minerals and Ceramics Laboratory	552 Booth Street	Somerset			
Burpee House	22 Rideau Terrace	Rideau-Rockcliffe	c. 1908		
Burritt House	4390 Donnelly Drive	Rideau-Jock			
Butler House	1445 St. Joseph Boulevard	Orléans West	Early 19th century		
Butterworth House	324 Somerset Street West	Somerset	1894	Probably James A. Corry	
Byward Market Building	50 York Street	Rideau-Vanier	1927		
Caiger House	1126 O'Grady Street	Rideau-Jock			
Cameron House (Clendenan House)	2226 Old Montreal Road	Orléans East-Cumberland	Prior to 1851		
Capital Wire Cloth Company	7 Hinton Avenue	Kitchissippi	1912 to 1948		
Captain Stephen Collins House	3436 Prince of Wales Drive	Barrhaven East	Approx. 1830		
Carkner Lumber Mill	9047 Carkner Street	Osgoode	1874		
Carleton County Court House	2 Daly Avenue	Rideau-Vanier	1870–71	Robert Surtees	
Carleton County Gaol	75 Nicholas Street	Rideau-Vanier	1862	H. H. Horsey	
Carleton County Registry Office	22 Daly Avenue	Rideau-Vanier	1871		
Carp Agricultural Hall	3790 Carp Road	West Carleton-March			
Cartier Square Drill Hall	2 Queen Elizabeth Driveway	Somerset	1879	Thomas Seaton Scott	
Casa Loma	9 Crescent Road	Rideau-Rockcliffe	1911	Allan Keefer, A.J. Hazelgrove	
Central Chambers	38-54 Elgin Street	Somerset	1890	John James Browne	
Central Emergency Headquarters	2389 Carp Road	West Carleton-March	1959–1961		
Central Park	630 Bank Street	Capital	1912	Frederick Todd	
Charles Billings House	187 Billings Avenue	Alta Vista		Braddish Billings and family	
Chamberlain House	328 Somerset Street West	Somerset	1894		
Champagne Bath	321 King Edward Avenue	Rideau-Vanier	1921–1924	W.E. Noffke	
Champlain Oil Service Centre	70 Richmond Road	Kitchissippi			
Chapel of the Holy Spirit, All Saints' Anglican Church	347 Richmond Road	Kitchissippi	1865–1872	Thomas Fuller	
Charles Smith/ James Smith House	72 Steeple Hill Crescent	Rideau-Jock	c. 1830		
Château Laurier	1 Rideau Street	Rideau-Vanier	1908–1912	Bradford Lee Gilbert, Ross and MacFarlane	
Chelsea Club	236 Metcalfe Street	Somerset	1884		
Christ Church Cathedral	439 Queen Street	Somerset	1872	King Arnoldi	
Church of St. Luke's	760 Somerset Street West	Somerset	1922	Colin Drewitt	
Cinnamon House	6564 Prince of Wales Drive	Rideau-Jock		Boyd Brothers	
City of Ottawa Workshops	7 Bayview Station Road	Kitchissippi	1941	Joseph Holmes Irvine	
City Registry Office	70 Nicholas Street	Rideau-Vanier	1874		
City Waterworks Building and Aqueduct	10 Fleet Street	Somerset	1873–74	Thomas Keefer	
Clarke House	43 Gilmour Street	Somerset	1898	100px	
Clearview	2607 Old Montreal Road	Orléans East-Cumberland			
Clegg-Feller Building	155 Rideau Street	Rideau-Vanier	1864		
Cobble Cottage	420 Kenwood Avenue	Kitchissippi			
Connaught Building	555 Mackenzie Avenue	Rideau-Vanier	1913–1914	David Ewart	
Connors House	166 Huron Avenue	Kitchissippi		Francis C. Sullivan	
Courtney House	245 Laurier Avenue East	Rideau-Vanier	About 1875		
Crichton Lodge	1160 Lisgar Road	Rideau-Rockcliffe	1887	Thomas Clarke	
Crichton Street School	200 Chrichton Street	Rideau-Rockcliffe	1906; 1919	William B. Garvock	
Cumberland Heritage Village Museum	2940 Old Montreal Road	Orléans East-Cumberland			
Deschâtelets Building	60 Oblats Avenue	Capital	1885	M. Mesnard	
Dennis Bergan House	3697 Jockvale Road	Barrhaven West	1892		
Devonshire Community Public School	100 Breezehill Avenue	Kitchissippi	1910		
Diamond Methodist Church	3303 Diamondview Road	West Carleton-March	1865		
Dickinson Square	1127 Mill Street	Rideau-Jock	1859–60 (Mill); 1868 (House)		
Dibb House	3150 Donnelly Drive	Rideau-Jock	1871–79		
Dr. Robert Law House	190 Laurier Avenue East	Rideau-Vanier	c. 1886		
Drummond Presbyterian Church	2027 Roberston Drive	College	1898		
Dwyer Hill Roman Catholic Burial Ground	O'Neil Road	Rideau-Jock			
Earnscliffe	140 Sussex	Rideau-Vanier	1855–57		
Echo-Bank House	700 Echo Drive	Capital	1865		
École Guigues	159 Murray Street	Rideau-Vanier	1904–1905		
École St-Pierre	353 Friel Street	Rideau-Vanier	1906	Felix Maral Hamel	
Edward Monaghan House	5100 Fallowfield Road	Rideau-Jock	1886	Edward Monaghan	
Église Adventiste Francophone d'Ottawa / Former Adath Jeshurun Synagogue	375 King Edward Avenue	Rideau-Vanier	1904	John W.H. Watts	
Embassy of Turkey / Children's Hospital	197-199 Wurtemberg Street	Rideau-Vanier	1869		
Engel House	2306 Relin Way	Rideau-Jock			
Ewart House	464 Besserer Street	Rideau-Vanier	1873–74		
Fairfields	3080 Richmond Road	Bay	1870		
Fallowfield United Church	119 Steeple Hill Crescent	Rideau-Jock	1886		
Featherstone Building	103, 105 Rideau Street	Rideau-Vanier	c. 1869		
First Avenue Public School	73 First Avenue	Capital	1898	E. L. Horwood	
First Baptist Church	140 Laurier Avenue West	Somerset	1877		
Flavien Rochon House	138 St. Patrick Street	Rideau-Vanier	1832 or mid-1840s		
Fleck House	500 Wilbrod Street	Rideau-Vanier	1901–02	J. W. H. Watts	
Flewellyn/Jones House	5897 Fernbank Road	Stittsville	late 19th century		
Foisey House	188 St. Andrew Street	Rideau-Vanier	1860		
Former école Sacré-Cœur	19 Melrose Avenue	Kitchissippi	1912	Francis Sullivan	
Former Osgoode Township Hall	8243 Victoria Street	Osgoode	1891	James Mather	
Former Ottawa City Hall / John G. Diefenbaker Building	111 Sussex Drive	Rideau-Vanier	1957	Bland, Rother and Trudeau	
Former Skead's Mills Methodist Church	307 Richmond Road	Kitchissippi	1898		
Fraser Schoolhouse	47 Sussex Drive	Rideau-Rockcliffe	1837		
Frechette House	87 MacKay Street	Rideau-Rockcliffe	c. 1877		
Fry House	4148 Donnelly Drive	Rideau-Jock	c. 1867		
Gamman House	306 Cyr Avenue	Rideau-Vanier	1873		
Garrett House	51 Chrichton Street	Rideau-Rockcliffe	Prior to 1874		
Garvock House	139 Crichton Street	Rideau-Rockcliffe	1874	Alexander Garvock	
Gilkinson's Barn	8724 McCaffrey Trail	Rideau-Jock	About 1910		
Gilroy Farm	7406 Gilroy Road	Rideau-Jock	By 1861		
Glebe Collegiate Institute	212 Glebe Avenue	Capital	1921–1923	John Albert Ewart	
Glebe Community Centre/St. Paul's Methodist Church/St. James' United Church	175 Third Avenue	Capital	1914–1924	Clarence J. Burritt	
Goodwin House	312 Laurier Avenue East	Rideau-Vanier	1900		
Graham-McGillivray Building	419-423 Sussex Drive	Rideau-Vanier	c. 1866		
Grant House	150 Elgin Street	Somerset	1875	Braddish Billings III	
Grant School	2720 Richmond Road	Bay	1922		
Grand Central Hotel	74 George Street	Rideau-Vanier	1876		
Grayburn House	284-286 Stewart Street	Rideau-Vanier	Approx. 1875–76		
Green House	174, 176 King Edward Avenue	Rideau-Vanier	Prior to 1873		
Green's Hotel	1510 Stittsville Main Street	Stittsville	1890		
Grierson Residence	486 Hazeldean Road	Kanata South			
Hackett House	2659 Roger Stevens Drive	Rideau-Jock			
Harrison House	6576 Fourth Line Road	Rideau-Jock			
Hartin Hotel	1993 Robertson Road	College		David Hartin	
Hart Massey House	400 Lansdowne Road	Rideau-Rockcliffe		Hart Massey	
Henderson House	34 Alexander Street	Rideau-Rockcliffe	1864–65		
Hintonburg Pumping Station	5 Onigam Street	Kitchissippi	Before 1900		
Hobbs House	7809 Bleeks Road	Rideau-Jock	before 1863		
Hollywood Parade	103, 105, 107, 109, 111, 113 James Street	Somerset	1893	James A. Corry	
Horticulture Building	957 Bank Street	Capital	1914	Francis C. Sullivan	
Hunt House	149 Hopewell Avenue	Capital	1898		
Hutcheson House	406 Queen Street	Somerset	1899		
Hydro Sub-Station No. 2	247 Glebe Avenue	Capital		John E. Brown & W. C. Beattie	
Hydro Sub-Station No. 3	1275 Carling Avenue	Kitchissippi		William C. Beattie	
Hydro Sub-Station No. 4	351 King Edward Avenue	Rideau-Vanier		William C. Beattie	
Hydro Sub-Station No. 5	39 Riverdale Avenue	Capital		J. Albert Ewart	
Institut canadien français d'Ottawa	18 York Street	Rideau-Vanier	1876	J.P.M. Lecourt	
James Dupuis House	6722 Rideau Valley Drive South	Rideau-Jock			
James Fleck House	404 Queen Street	Somerset	1894		
James Long House	28 Long Gate Court	Barrhaven East	1900–1903	James Long	
Jarvis House	65 Stewart Street	Rideau-Vanier	1885		
Jones House	119 Stanley Avenue	Rideau-Rockcliffe	Prior to 1892		
Kemp's Tavern	5816 Hazeldean Road	Stittsville	1868		
Kilmorie	21 Withrow Avenue	College	Between 1840 and 1850		
Langevin Block	80 Wellington Street	Somerset	1884	Thomas Fuller	
Lansdowne Terrace	157, 159, 161, 163, 165, 167 MacKay Street	Rideau-Rockcliffe	c. 1876		
Laurier House	335 Laurier Avenue East	Rideau-Vanier	1878		
Laws House	2087 Riverside Drive	Alta Vista	Between 1830 and 1840	Braddish Billings	
Lincez House	1130 O'Grady Street	Rideau-Jock			
Lindsay House	6840 Rideau Valley Drive South	Rideau-Jock	1850		
Lipsett House	37 Oriole Drive	Beacon Hill-Cyrville			
Lisgar Collegiate, North Building	29 Lisgar Avenue	Somerset	1874		
Lyon House	112 Daly Avenue	Rideau-Vanier	c. 1850		
Macdonald Gardens Park	99 Cobourg Street	Rideau-Vanier		Frederick Todd	
MacKay United Church	257 MacKay Street	Rideau-Rockcliffe	1909	H. F. Ballantyne	
Magee House / HMCS ByTown Officers' Mess	78 Lisgar Street	Somerset		Mathew Sheard	
Maguire House (Fourth Line Road)	6607 Fourth Line Road	Rideau-Jock			
Maguire House (Roger Stevens Drive)	2323 Roger Stevens Drive	Rideau-Jock			
Maison Côté	213 Wilbrod Street	Rideau-Vanier	c. 1867		
Maison Jeanne d'Arc	362, 364 Kenwood Avenue	Kitchissippi	1934	Mère Marie Thomas D'Aquin	
Maison Joseph Archambault	117 St. Andrew Street	Rideau-Vanier	c. 1887		
Maison Mère des Sœurs Grises de la croix	9 Bruyère Street	Rideau-Vanier	1849–50; 1867	Antoine Robillard	
Maison Odillon Archambault	221-223 St. Andrew Street	Rideau-Vanier	1895	Odillon Archambault	
Manotick United Church	5567 Manotick Main Street	Rideau-Jock	1903		
Maplelawn	529 Richmond Road	Bay	1831		
March House Restaurant	806 March Road	Kanata North	1850s		
Marlborough Township Hall	3048 Pierce Road	Rideau-Jock	1855	Robert Mackey	
Martineau's Hotel	55 Murray Street	Rideau-Vanier	1871–72	Eugène Martineau	
Mason House	101 Bayswater Avenue	Kitchissippi	1891	Robert Mason	
Mayfair Theatre	1074 Bank Street	Capital	1932		
McAuliffe House	182, 184 Lisgar Street	Somerset	1906	William McAuliffe	
McCloy House	42 Bolton Street	Rideau-Vanier	c. 1871		
McFadden House	5561 Manotick Main Street	Rideau-Jock			
McFarlance Terrace	199, 201, 205 Daly Avenue	Rideau-Vanier	1868		
McLeod House	92 Stanley Avenue	Rideau-Rockcliffe	c. 1867		
McManus House	4435 Donnelly Drive	Rideau-Jock	before 1863		
Medical Arts Building	180 Metcalfe Street	Somerset	1928	W. E. Noffke	
Merivale United Church and Cemetery	1876 Merivale Road	Knoxdale-Merivale	1876		
Minor House	6732 Waterloo Street	Rideau-Jock			
Minto Bridges	Union Street	Rideau-Vanier / Rideau-Rockcliffe	1900–1902	R. Surtees	
Mitron House	62 Sweetland Avenue	Rideau-Vanier	1985	Sarah and Andrew Mitrow	
Monastère des Sœurs de la Visitation Sainte-Marie d'Ottawa	114 Richmond Road	Kitchissippi	1864–65; 1913	Sidney Bowles Fripp	
Monastère du Précieux Sang / Royal College of Physicians and Surgeons	774 Echo Rive	Capital	1914–1923	Alphonse Content	
Mulligan's School S.S. No. 1 Huntley / The Cheshire Cat Pub	2193 Richardson Side Road	West Carleton-March	1883		
Mutchmor Public School	185 Fifth Avenue	Capital	1895	E. L. Horwood	
Nagel House	77 Gloucester Street	Somerset	1872		
Nepean Town Hall	345 Richmond Road	Kitchissippi	1896		
North Gower Old Town Hall	6581 Fourth Line Road	Rideau-Jock	1876		
Notre Dame Basilica	375-385 Sussex Drive	Rideau-Vanier	1846	Antoine Robillard and Father John Francis Cannon	
Oakleigh	1038 Oak Creek Road	West Carleton-March	Late 1850s	Unknown	
O'Connor House	2944 Pierce Road	Rideau-Jock			
O'Connor Street Bridge	O'Connor Street (at Patterson Creek)	Capital	1907	Francis Conroy Sullivan	
Odell House	180 Waller Street	Rideau-Vanier	1883–84		
Old Anglican Christ Church Ashton	8938 Flewellyn Road	Rideau-Jock	1845		
Old Canadian War Museum	Sussex Drive	Rideau-Vanier	1904-1906	David Ewart	
Old Forge	2730 Carling Avenue	River	c. 1830		
Old St. Mary's Anglican Church and Cemetery	269 Pinhey's Point Road	West Carleton-March	Between 1825 and 1827		
Old St. Stephen's Church	181 Britannia Road	Bay	1892		
Old Wilson House	2800 Old Montreal Road	Orléans East-Cumberland	Prior to 1861		
Ottawa East Town Hall	61 Main Street	Capital	1895		
Ottawa Electric Railway Sub-Station	340 Holland Avenue	Kitchissippi	1924	D. J. Spence	
Ottawa Hydro Electric Company Building	109 Bank Street	Somerset	1934?	W. C. Beattie	
Ottawa Ladies' College	268 First Avenue	Capital	1912–1914	Allan Keefer	
Ottawa Marble and Granite Works	14 Waller Street	Rideau-Vanier	1866		
Ottawa New Edinburgh Club	501 Sir George-Étienne Cartier Parkway	Rideau-Rockcliffe	1914	C.P. Meredith	
Ottawa Normal School	195 Elgin Street	Somerset	1874		
Ottawa Rowing Club Boathouse	8, 10 Lady Grey Drive	Rideau-Vanier	1898		
Ottawa Tennis and Lawn Bowling Club	176 Cameron Avenue	Capital			
Overbrook Public School	149 King George Street	Rideau-Rockcliffe	1916	Millson and Burgess	
Parkdale Fire Station	424 Parkdale Avenue	Kitchissippi	1924	Millson, Burgess, and Hazelgrove	
Pattee/Freiman House	149 Somerset Street West	Somerset	1891		
Patterson House	336 Daly Avenue	Rideau-Vanier	1869–70		
Patrick Waters House	20 Stone House Court	Barrhaven West	1871	Patrick Waters	
Peter Pritchard House	5559 Manotick Main Street	Rideau-Jock	early 1880s		
Philomene Terrace	363, 365, 369, 371, 375, 377, 381, 383 Daly Avenue	Rideau-Vanier	1874–75	Honore Robillard	
Pinard House	175 King Edward Avenue	Rideau-Vanier	Probably 1866		
Pinhey Cottage	5029 Dunrobin Road	West Carleton-March	1820s		
Pinhey's Point Historic Site	270 Pinhey's Point Road	West Carleton-March			
Plant Bath	930 Somerset Street West	Somerset	1924	Millson, Burgess and Hazelgrove	
Plummer House	229 Chapel Street	Rideau-Vanier	1875	Horsey and Sheard	
Pooley's Bridge	9 Fleet Street	Somerset	1872	George Hugo Perry	
Pope House	275 MacLaren Street	Somerset	1880s		
Porter's Island Bridge	–	Rideau-Vanier		Robert Surtees	
Powell House	85 Glebe Avenue	Capital	1912	W.E. Noffke	
Powers House	429 Bay Street	Somerset	c. 1887	Francis C. Sullivan (reconstruction)	
Presbyterian Manse	108 Falldown Lane	West Carleton-March	1902		
Presley House	6295 Fourth Line Road	Rideau-Jock	c. 1870–77		
Puddicombe House	410 Queen Street	Somerset	1899		
Queale Terrace	304, 306, 308, 310, 312 Queen Elizabeth Driveway	Capital	1906		
Quinn's Row	245, 247, 249, 251 Nepean Street	Somerset	c. 1889		
Rathier House	193, 195 Cumberland Street	Rideau-Vanier	c. 1862		
Reagan House	66-68 Stewart Street	Rideau-Vanier	Prior to 1866		
Reilly Blacksmith Shop	7347 Franktown Road	Rideau-Jock	1845	Thomas Reilly	
Residence Brousseau	204-210 St. Patrick Street	Rideau-Vanier	1898		
Richardson Farmhouse	185 Boundstone Way	Kanata North	c. 1871		
Richelieu Park	300 Pères-Blancs Avenue	Rideau-Vanier	1938		
Rideau Branch, Ottawa Public Library	377 Rideau Street	Rideau-Vanier	1934	J.P. MacLaren	
Rideau Hotel	91, 93, 95 Rideau Street	Rideau-Vanier	1900–01		
Robertson House	32 Cameron Avenue	Capital	c. 1887		
Robinson-Birkett Building	107 Rideau Street	Rideau-Vanier	1879		
Rochon House	150 St. Patrick Street	Rideau-Vanier	1898	Oscar Beaudry	
Rocque House	276 Bruyère Street	Rideau-Vanier	1865–69		
Ross House	188-192 Stewart Street	Rideau-Vanier	1869		
Rowatt House	66 Bradford Street	Bay	c. 1878		
Rutherford House	4515 9th Line Road	Osgoode	c. 1855		
Savery Home	3856 Loggers Way	West Carleton-March	1833	Thomas Fraser	
School Section No 1	400 Goldridge Drive	Kanata North	1886		
School Section No. 10, Nepean (Jockvale School)	3131 Jockvale Road	Barrhaven West	1906		
School Section No. 13, Gloucester (Ramsayville School)	3455 Ramsayville Road	Gloucester-Southgate	1894		
School Section No. 13, Nepean (Merivale School)	51 Slack Road	Knoxdale-Merivale	1895–1900		
School Section No. 3, Nepean (Mosgrove School)	2976 Richmond Road	Bay	1887		
Scott House	7668 Franktown Road	Rideau-Jock	c. 1850		
Scottish Ontario Chambers/Trust Block	42-50 Sparks Street	Somerset	1883	William Hodgson	
Shirreff Log Home	2337 Fitzroy Street	West Carleton-March	1855		
Shouldice Hotel	62-66 York Street	Rideau-Vanier	1846		
Simard House	31 Sweetland Avenue	Rideau-Vanier	1884	Olivier Simard	
Snowdon House	66 Lisgar Street	Somerset	1891		
Stadacona Hall	395 Laurier Avenue East	Rideau-Vanier	1871		
St. Alban the Martyr Anglican Church	125 Daly Avenue	Rideau-Vanier	1867	King Arnoldi	
Standard Bread Company	951 Gladstone Avenue	Kitchissippi	1924	Sydney Comber	
St. Andrew's Presbyterian Church (Kilmaurs)	1325 Kilmaurs Side Road	West Carleton-March	1886		
St. Andrew's Presbyterian Church (Ottawa)	82 Kent Street	Somerset	1872		
St. Anne's Church	528 Old St. Patrick Street	Rideau-Vanier	1873	J.P. LeCourt	
St. Anne's Rectory	17 Myrand Avenue	Rideau-Vanier	1921	W.E. Noffke	
St. Augustine's Church	100 Huxley Street	West Carleton-March	1901–1902	John W. H. Watts	
St. Bartholomew's Anglican Church	125 MacKay Street	Rideau-Rockcliffe	1868	Thomas Seaton Scott	
St. Brigid's Church	314 St. Patrick Street	Rideau-Vanier	1889–1890	John R. Bowes	
St. Charles Church	135 Barrette Street	Rideau-Vanier		Charles Brodeur	
St. Charles School	24 Springfield Road	Rideau-Rockcliffe	1910	Moses Edey	
St. Clare's Catholic Church	4009 Dwyer Hill Road	Rideau-Jock	1915	Francis Sullivan	
St. James Tennis Club		Capital	1907		
St. John's Anglican Church and Rectory	325 Sandhill Road	Kanata North	1839	Alexander Christie	
St. John's Anglican Church Cemetery	1890 Merivale Road	Knoxdale-Merivale	1874		
St. Louis Hotel	39-41 York Street	Rideau-Vanier	1875		
St. Louis House	1579 Washington Street	Rideau-Jock			
St. Patrick's Roman Catholic Church	240 Kent Street	Somerset	1869–1873	King Arnoldi	
St. Patrick's Church, Rectory and Cemetery	15 Steeple Hill Crescent	Rideau-Jock	1866		
St. Paul's Eastern United Church	Corners of Daly and Cumberland Streets	Rideau-Vanier	1888		
St. Paul's Evangelical Lutheran Church	208 Wilbrod Street	Rideau-Vanier	1899; 1948	Adam Harvey; W. E. Noffke	
Sullivan House	346 Somerset Street East	Rideau-Vanier	1914	Francis Sullivan	
The Atwood	97, 99 Rideau Street	Rideau-Vanier	1908		
The Duncannon	216 Metcalfe Street	Somerset	1931	Cecil Burgess	
The Shefford	300 Cooper Street	Somerset	1912		
The Strathcona	404 Laurier Avenue East	Rideau-Vanier	1926–27		
Thomas Nelson House	41 Beaver Ridge	Knoxdale-Merivale	c. 1850	Thomas Nelson	
Thomson House	6727 Lord Nelson Street	Rideau-Jock		J. Adam Eastman	
Toller House	Corner of Chapel and Daly Streets	Rideau-Vanier	1875		
Town Hall, March Township	821 March Road	Kanata North	1901	Humphrey Gow	
Transportation Building	10 Rideau Street	Rideau-Vanier	1916	J. Albert Ewart	
Trinity United Church	6656 Rideau Valley Drive South	Rideau-Jock	1894		
Tupper House of Thunderwood Farm	6713 Second Line Road	Rideau-Jock	1850s	John O'Callaghan	
Union Bank of Canada Building	128 Wellington Street	Somerset	1888		
Union Mission Building	47 Daly Avenue	Rideau-Vanier	1861–62	Wilhelm Rahe	
Union Station	2 Rideau Street	Rideau-Vanier	1909–12	Bradford Gilbert; Ross and MacFarlane	
Valade House	142 St. Patrick Street	Rideau-Vanier	pre-1866		
Varin Row	106, 108, 110 Daly Avenue	Rideau-Vanier	1870	Charles Varin	
Venn House	69 Elm Street	Somerset	1900–02		
Victoria Memorial Museum	240 McLeod Street	Somerset	1905–1912	David Ewart	
Wallace Farm House / Tierney House	5519 Old Richmond Road	Rideau-Jock	19th Century		
Wallis House	589 Rideau Street	Rideau-Vanier	1873–75	Robert Surtees	
Weatherhead House	6924 Gallagher Road	Rideau-Jock	c. 1857		
Weaver's House	1131 Mill Street	Rideau-Jock			
White House	132 Stewart Street	Rideau-Vanier	1874–75		
William Murphy House	127 Britannia Road	Bay			
Williams House	96 Southern Drive	Capital	About 1827		
Winterholme	309 Daly Avenue	Rideau-Vanier	1865		
Woodburn House	73, 75 MacKay Street	Rideau-Rockcliffe	c. 1874		
York Street Public School	310 York Street	Rideau-Vanier	1921	William C. Beattie	
Youville Farm	1811 St. Joseph Boulevard	Orléans West-Innes	1885		

== See also ==
- List of buildings in Ottawa
- List of tallest buildings in Ottawa-Gatineau
- List of National Historic Sites of Canada in Ottawa
- List of historic places in Ottawa
