= Maharishi Heaven on Earth Development =

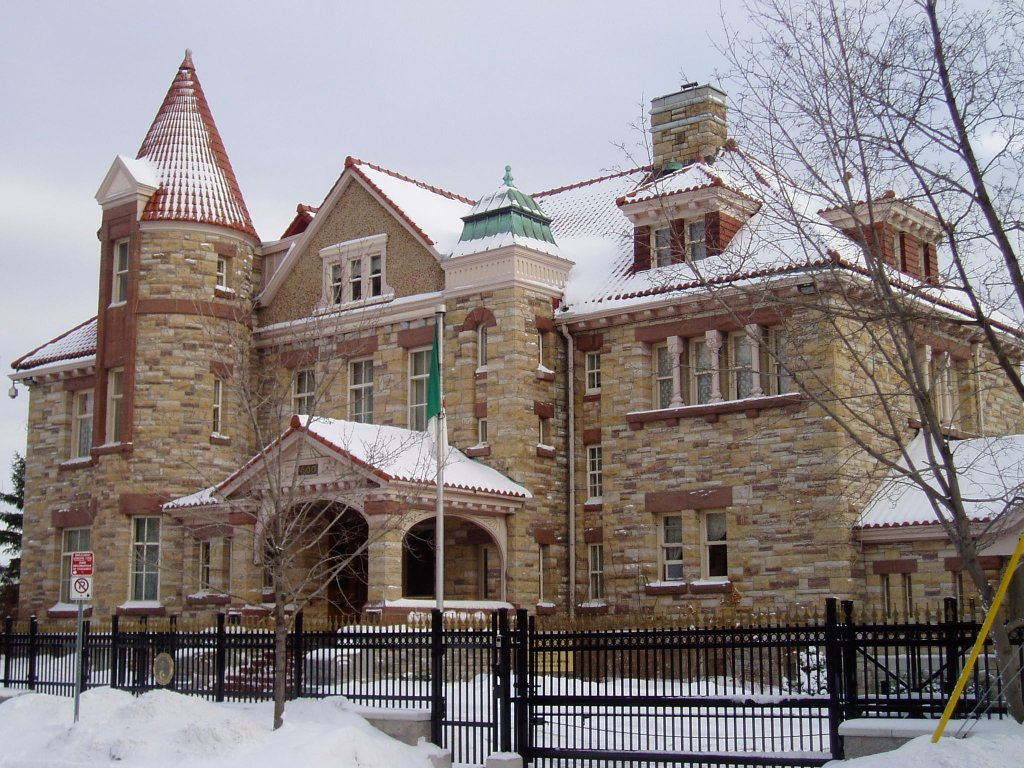
The Fleck/Paterson House, Canadian HQ of Maharishi Heaven on Earth Development Corp. in the 1990s

Maharishi Heaven on Earth Development Corp. (MHOED) is a for-profit real estate developer associated with Maharishi Mahesh Yogi and his Transcendental Meditation movement. First founded in Malibu California in 1988, it has sought to build utopian projects in the U.S., Canada, and Africa with a long-term goal to "reconstruct the entire world", at an estimated cost of $100 trillion.

The US arm planned to work with developers to build 50 "Maharishi Cities of Immortals" in the US and Canada. The Canadian arm bought and renovated the Fleck/Paterson House in Ottawa in 2002, earning the "adaptive use award of excellence" from the City. A subsidiary purchased land to build Maharishi Veda Land theme parks in Orlando, Florida and Niagara Falls, Ontario. The Dutch arm negotiated with the presidents of Zambia and Mozambique to acquire a quarter of the land in those countries in exchange for solving their problems.

== History ==
=== Origins ===
Maharishi Heaven on Earth Development Corp. was founded in Malibu, California in 1988 by its first president, money manager Monty Guild. It was initially financed by Guild, who donated his shares to Maharishi University of Management.

=== City of Immortals developments ===
MHOED announced in 1988 that it planned to build 50 low-density "Maharishi Cities of Immortals" across the U.S. and Canada. Each City of Immortals development would include a pond or lake, a Maharishi elementary school, a for-profit Maharishi Ayurvedic health clinic, a festival hall, and an organic vegetable garden. The walled and gated developments would include from 100 to 200 homes. The lots would be 1-acre (4,000 m^{2}) or larger and an equal amount of space would be devoted to common areas, like parks, lakes, and gardens. Internal combustion vehicles would be parked at the perimeter and only electric carts or bicycles would be used inside the development. The individual homes would be built using Maharishi Sthapatya Veda (MSV) specifications with non-toxic materials and natural ventilation.

MSV design principles say that, with proper placement and orientation, one naturally feels hungry in a dining room and sleepy in a bedroom. According to developer, Curtis McDonald,"What we are striving for is a complete restructuring of the world and we want to begin with the large cities in the U.S. With the Maharishi's Cities of Immortals, our plan is to establish a new way of life, to eliminate all the unhealthful aspects of the way our communities are currently being built." Guild planned a 29-city tour to recruit developers. The proposal was that the company would not own or build the development, but would advise the developers on MSV design and planning principles, and provide sales support, including celebrity endorsements, for 2.5% of the construction costs, plus 1% of the retail costs, plus a sales commission. Half of the profits would go to financing Ideal Villages in the Third World. The homes were expected to cost at least 10% more than comparable properties in normal developments. In the San Francisco area, the representatives said that homes prices were expected to be between $300,000 and $1 million, depending on land costs. At a later presentation in Canada, prices were predicted to be from $130,000 to $150,000. A developer attending a presentation said a home with the listed amenities would cost several times that amount. One announcement said that the developments would also include subsidized homes.

The areas where developments might be built included Malibu, Houston, Austin, Toronto, Hartford, Connecticut, and Denver. In 1989, it announced that it had signed contracts with developers for projects in eight of those cities, and was on the verge of signing contracts in seven more. A parcel near Austin, Texas was described as a 30-home prototype. It was adjacent to a development built in 1981 called "Radiance" which was mostly populated with TM practitioners. However after two and a half years the project remained stalled for a lack of financing. Construction was begun at a site owned by MHOED on Mount Shefford near Bromont, Quebec in June 1991, and 30 of the 100 lots were reported to have sold. Prospective home owners supplied details about their occupation and precise birth location, date and time so that the MSV designers could properly customize the building for its intended resident.

Creating these cities globally was projected to cost $100 trillion. It was hoped that at least a hundred would be built around the world.

An architect, who was invited to one of the promotional lunches, questioned the need for low density suburban developments. Some TM practitioners were concerned about what they saw as "elitist and secretive elements" to the plans, including the elaborate security.

=== Maharishi Veda Land ===
Maharishi Veda Land International (MVLI) was a wholly owned subsidiary created to finance the construction of Maharishi Veda Land themes parks being promoted by magician Doug Henning. Henning was a director of MVLI and the president and chairman of Maharishi Veda Land Canada. The MHOED loaned $4 million in seed money, at 11% interest. The MVLI was seeking to arrange $230 million in equity, $438 million in debt, and $60 million in sponsorships from corporations. Various locations for the parks were proposed, and properties were acquired in Orlando and Niagara Falls. The parks were seen as complementing the Cities of Immortals, and they might have been co-located.

=== Other activities ===
In the 1990s MHOED began buying old hotels in U.S. city centers, purchasing over a dozen by 1994.

The Maharishi Heaven on Earth Development Corp. Canada purchased the historic Fleck/Paterson House in 1992 in Ottawa for its Canadian headquarters and a subsidiary, Maharishi Vedic Education Development Institute. It spent a reported $3 million to purchase and restore the 15,000-square-foot (1,400 m^{2}) house, which had fallen into ruin. The restoration was praised in the press and received the "adaptive use award of excellence" from the City of Ottawa. Four suites were available to the public as a bed and breakfast. It sold the house in 2002 to the Algerian Embassy for $2.9 million, a record price for a heritage home in Ottawa. Helen Foster, then the group's director, said they were planning to spend $6 million to build a 63,000-square-foot (5,900 m^{2}) Maharishi Peace Palace to house the movement's operations.

=== Zambia and Mozambique ===
"Maharishi Heaven on Earth Development Company" (Mahedco), a company based in the Netherlands headed by Jacques Uijen, approached Zambia's President Kenneth Kaunda in 1990 with a proposal to solve the country's dire problems and to rid it of "evil and diseases". In the plan, 1,000 Zambians would receive training from the TM movement and oversee the creation of utopian farming communities that would be turned over to Mahedco. The agreement covered 18 million hectares (44 million acres), 23% of the country's land surface and half of its arable land. Kingsley Chinkuli, the Home Affairs minister, granted Mahedco "the right to select those Zambian families which will live on the land". News of the agreement came out a year later, just prior to an election, and became a significant campaign issue. Kaunda admitted that the agreement existed, but denied that he went in for Transcendental Meditation himself and described the agreement as an "experiment" and a "necessary catalyst" for change. After objections from his cabinet ministers, Kaunda agreed to alter the agreement to start with a 2,000-acre (8.1 km^{2}) pilot project, though if successful it would grow still to the same size incrementally. The net worth of Mahedco was reported at the time to be $26,000. A Zambian newspaperman was quoted as saying, "The whole thing is madness." The Maharishi said that he would abandon the effort if Kaunda lost the election.

After Kaunda lost his reelection bid, Mahedco sought a similar arrangement in neighboring Mozambique, where President Joaquim Chissano, his family and his cabinet were TM practitioners. It wanted the right to develop 20 million hectares of "unused land" by planting crops and to rebuild the country's infrastructure and health system. Chissano signed a 50-year contract which would give 40% of the profits to the Mozambique government. The government denied it when the negotiations became public in 1994.

A 2006 prospectus for the Raam currency/bearer bonds, issued by Stichting Maharishi Global Financing Research of MERU, Holland, lists Paul Gelderloos as the chief executive of Mahedco starting in 1990. The prospectus says that Mahedco "was responsible for the implementation of poverty removal programs in third-world countries and also launched several enterprises in Holland [sic]." Girish Govindji Momaya is described as the head from 1989 to 1991 of Maharishi Heaven on Earth Development in New Delhi. The prospectus says that the Maharishi Heaven on Earth Development Foundation (MAHEDFO) had long term liabilities of 1.6 million Euros in 2004.
