= York Street (disambiguation) =

York Street is a football stadium in Boston, England.

York Street may also refer to:

- York Street, Albany, Western Australia
- York Street, Dublin, Ireland
- York Street (London, Ontario), Canada
- York Street, Marylebone, London, England
- York Street, Westminster, historic name for Petty France in London, England
- York Street, Sydney, New South Wales, Australia
- York Street (Toronto) in Ontario, Canada
- York Street Historic District, in Newport, Kentucky, United States
- York Street Public School in Ottawa, Canada
- York Street Studio, a recording studio in Auckland, New Zealand

== See also ==
- York Street station (disambiguation)
