= St. Clement Parish (Ottawa) =

Coordinates: 45.434664°N 75.683347°W

- At St. Anne's Church
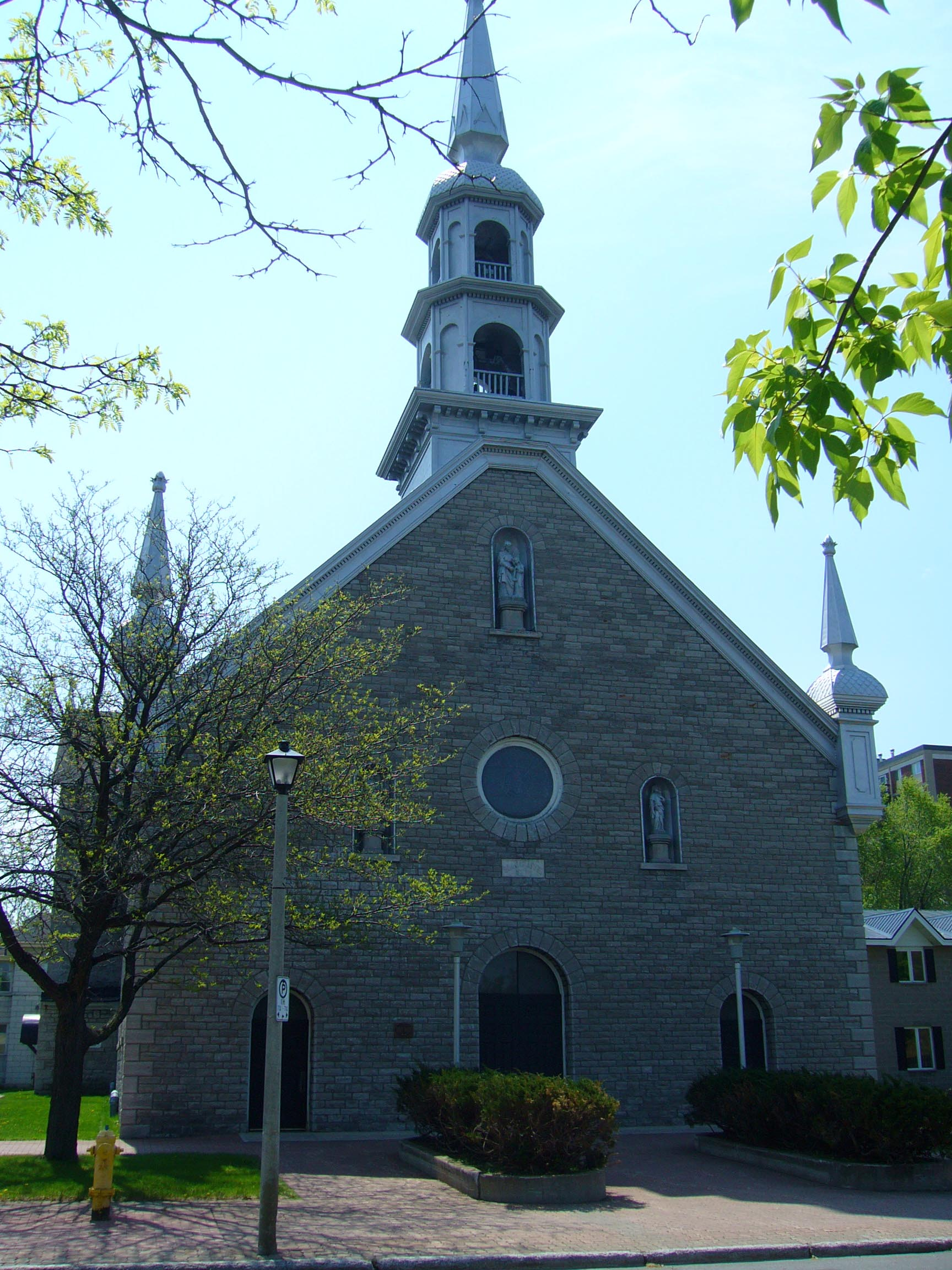
- Ste-Anne Church, home of St. Clement Parish
- St. Clement Parish
- Location: Ottawa, Ontario
- Country: Canada
- Denomination: Roman Catholic
- Website: http://www.stclement-ottawa.org/

History
- Former name: St. Clement Latin Community
- Founded: 1968
- Dedication: St. Clement I

Architecture
- Architect: J.P. LeCourt
- Architectural type: French Colonial Revival, Quebecois Architecture
- Completed: 1873

Administration
- Province: Ecclesiastical province of Ottawa
- Diocese: Archdiocese of Ottawa

Clergy
- Pastor(s): Fr. Erik Deprey, FSSP

St. Clement Parish (French: Paroisse St-Clément) is a bilingual Roman Catholic parish community located in Ottawa, Ontario, Canada and entrusted to the Priestly Fraternity of Saint Peter (FSSP). After the replacement of the liturgical norms of the 1962 Roman Missal by the post-Vatican II Mass in the 1960s, St. Clement Parish was the first community in the world to be authorized to celebrate the Mass and other sacraments in Latin only, according to the older liturgical norms. It eventually became the first canonically erected Personal Parish in the world established for Tridentine Mass. It was then entrusted to the pastoral care of the FSSP by the Archbishop of Ottawa. Since June 3, 2012, St. Clement Parish operates out of Ste-Anne Church in Lowertown.

== History ==
In 1968, Ottawa Archbishop Joseph-Aurèle Plourde authorized a small group of Catholics who remained attached to the Church's traditional liturgical heritage to continue to use the Latin Tridentine Mass. This group found an older priest who agreed to serve them in this desire, and they received permission to use the chapel of the Monastery of the Sisters Adorers of the Precious Blood on Echo Drive in Ottawa for Mass. They were served first by Canon René Martin, the chaplain of the convent, then by Fr. Guy Martin, W.F. In the early 1970s, the community was told to use the Mass of Paul VI, which they did, but using the Latin language. Fr. Charles-Henri Bélanger, a former padre of the Canadian Armed Forces, became chaplain to the congregation in 1981.

The Community continued to gather at the Precious Blood Sisters' Monastery until 1984 when the Sisters renovated their chapel. That year the Community acquired a small building of their own in the Ottawa suburb of Gloucester, which they renovated into a chapel, placed under the patronage of Saint Clement, and furnished with altars salvaged from the renovated Monastery chapel.

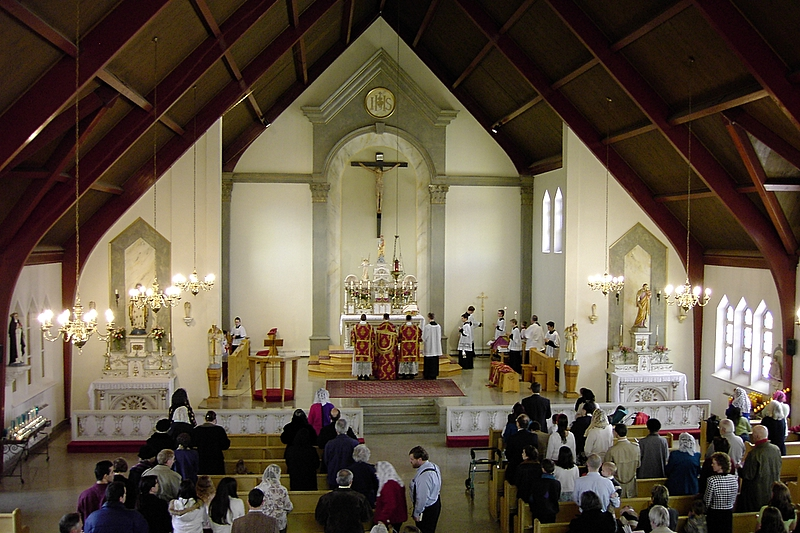
Solemn Mass being celebrated at the former parish church at 87 Mann Ave

The Community continued to use that chapel until the summer of 1993, when Archbishop Plourde's successor, Archbishop Marcel Gervais, made available a purpose-built church complete with rectory at the corner of Mann and Russell Avenues in the Sandy Hill neighborhood of Ottawa. Built in 1957, this building had housed a French-language Catholic parish, St. Pie X, until 1983, when the building had been sold to the Maronite diocese of Ottawa and renamed St. Charbel's. At the time the Maronite community in Ottawa was growing rapidly as a result of the Lebanese Civil War. In 1993 the Maronites moved to a larger church in Vanier. With this new church building, the Archbishop elevated the St. Clement Latin Community of Ottawa to the rank of a quasi-parish.

The Community had been served on an ad hoc basis by three older priests (one of them being Fr. John Mole, OMI) who were familiar with the rubrics of the Tridentine Mass. However, with failing health of all of them, the Community was concerned that it might have secured a permanent building but would be without a priest. At about that time, the Priestly Fraternity of St. Peter (FSSP) was getting ready to ordain its first Canadian-born priest. The FSSP is a fraternity of priests who are in full communion with the Holy See and are dedicated to preserving the pre-Vatican II form of the Roman Rite of Mass and all 1962 forms and liturgical books for the sacraments, as well as fostering Catholic teaching and devotion. Archbishop Gervais discussed the problem with the FSSP and it was agreed that the FSSP would assign a priest to minister to the needs of the St. Clement Community, making it the first personal parish entrusted to the FSSP in their history. The first FSSP-appointed priest, Fr. Charles Ryan, had been ordained only a few weeks before his assignment to St. Clement on New Year's Day, 1995. The FSSP has been serving the parish ever since.

In 1997, on the patronal feast (23 November), Archbishop Gervais erected St. Clement as a full canonical bilingual indult parish serving the faithful wishing to worship according to the earlier Roman liturgy.

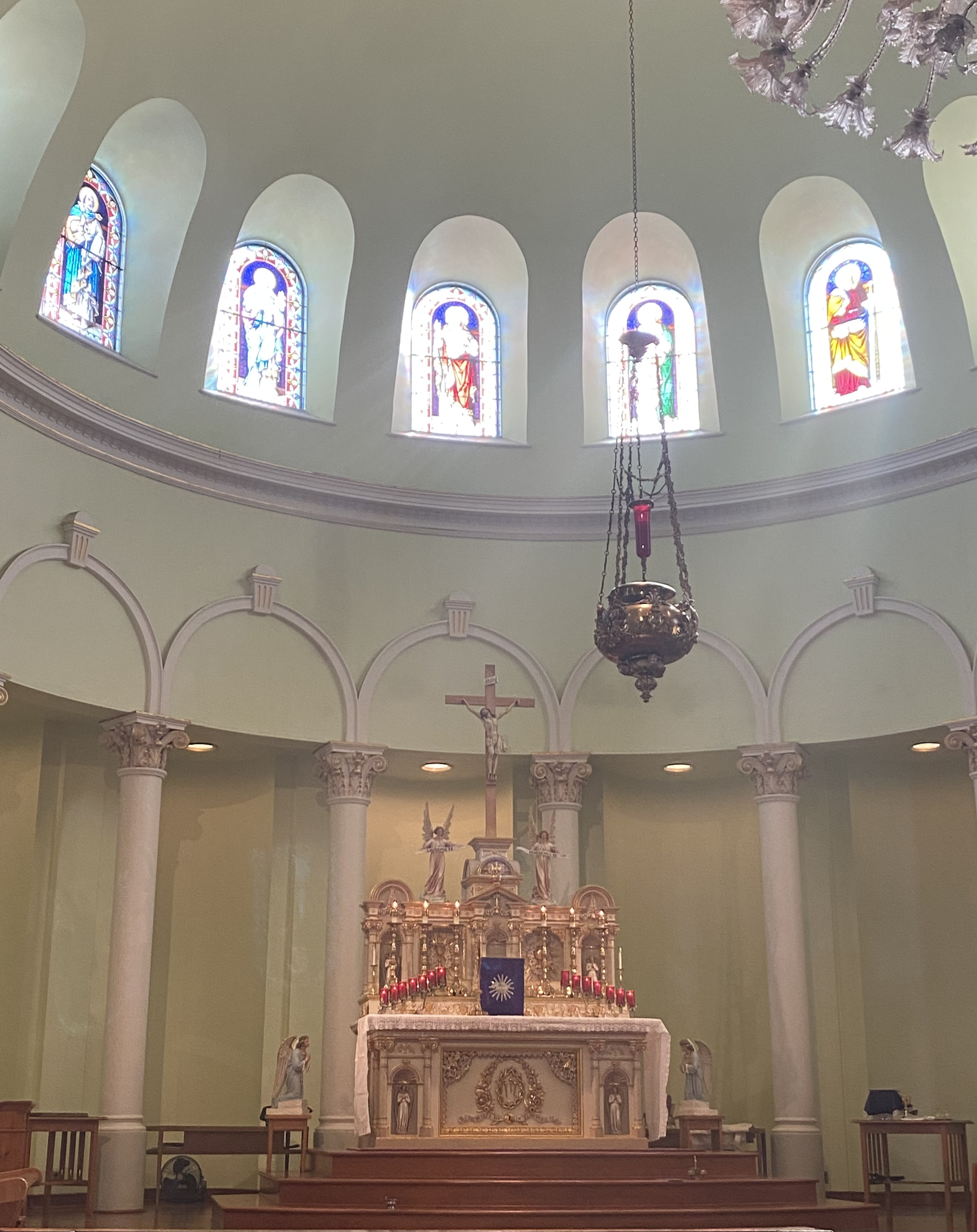
Interior of St. Clement's Parish (L’église Sainte-Anne) during Lent 2026

In June 2011, Archbishop Terrence Prendergast proposed that the St Clement parish community relocate to Ste-Anne Church, a heritage building in Lowertown which had closed due to low attendance. The parish agreed to the move and began holding Masses at Ste-Anne's on June 3, 2012. The original 1957 parish building on 87 Mann avenue was deconsecrated and eventually acquired by Canadian private equity real-estate investment firm Forum Asset Management, which then converted the building to a modern apartment complex targeted to students.

== Marie Reine du Canada Pilgrimage ==
Members of the parish organize and lead the annual Marie Reine du Canada Pilgrimage, a 100 km pilgrimage on foot from Saint-Joseph-de-Lanoraie to the Marian shrine of Notre-Dame du Cap at Cap de la Madeleine, Quebec. Founded by a group of lay parishioners and first partially walked in 2003, the pilgrimage is based on the Notre-Dame de Chrétienté pilgrimage from Notre-Dame de Paris to Chartres Cathedral in France. It takes place over the Labour Day weekend and draws over 70 pilgrims each year. In recent years the number has been about 100.
