= Ste-Anne Catholic Church (Ottawa) =

Coordinates: 45.434547°N 75.683178°W

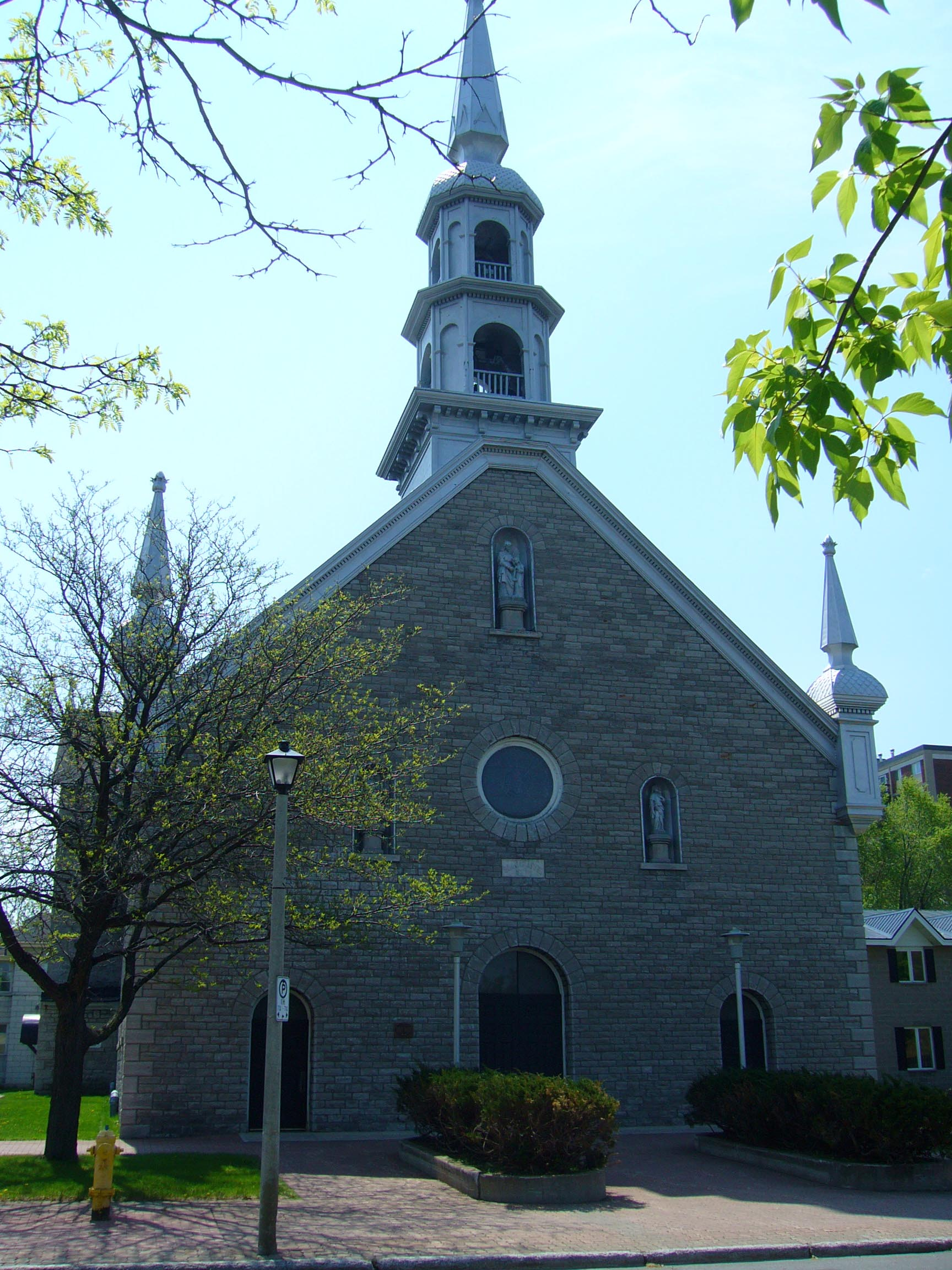
- Ste-Anne Catholic Church

Religion
- Affiliation: Catholic
- Patron: Saint Anne

Location
- Location: 528 Old St. Patrick Street in the Lowertown neighbourhood of Ottawa, Ontario, Canada
- Interactive map of Ste-Anne Catholic Church
- Administration: St. Clement Parish

Architecture
- Architect: J.P. LeCourt
- Type: French Colonial Revival
- Founder: Bishop Joseph-Bruno Guigues
- Completed: 1873

Ontario Heritage Act
- Official name: Ste-Anne Roman Catholic Church
- Designated: 1978

Ste-Anne is a Catholic church located at 528 Old St. Patrick Street in the Lowertown neighbourhood of Ottawa, Ontario, Canada. Built in 1873 by architect J.P. LeCourt, it is one of the few examples of traditional Québécois church architecture in Ontario. Ste-Anne is the home of St. Clement Parish, a bilingual parish community served by the Priestly Fraternity of Saint Peter, which celebrates the Mass and other sacraments in Latin according to the liturgical norms of the 1962 Roman Missal.

== History ==
Bishop Joseph-Bruno Guigues was responsible for the creation of the church, as by the 1870s Ottawa's French Catholic population outgrew the Notre-Dame Cathedral. Pierre Rocque worked as the contractor and assisted LeCourt in the construction. Bishop Guigues laid the cornerstone on May 4, 1873.

In April 2009, part of the roof collapsed, resulting in an 18-month restoration costing more than $1 million. Eight months after the church reopened, it was closed again by the Archdiocese of Ottawa due to dwindling attendance and economic problems. Archbishop Terrence Prendergast offered the building to the community of St. Clement Parish, which agreed to the move and began holding Masses at Ste-Anne's on June 3, 2012.

== Heritage Designation ==
Ste-Anne Catholic Church is a designated heritage property under Part IV of the Ontario Heritage Act. It is commemorated by the City of Ottawa with the following plaque:

1873

Eglise Sainte-Anne

This traditional Québec style church was designed by the architect J.P. Lecourt. The steeply-pitched roof and façade sculptures are common to churches of this type. It originally served the lowertown parish which extended to Notre Dame Cemetery.

Designated Heritage property 1978.

== Architecture ==
The building features a plain stone facade with a medieval-inspired rose window. The doors, windows, and three statuary niches contain classical rounded arches. A detailed three-tiered belfry tops contrasts with the simple stone facade.

== See also ==
- List of designated heritage properties in Ottawa
