= John W.H. Watts =

Canadian architect (1850-1917)

John William Hurrell Watts
- Born: John William Hurrell Watts; September 16, 1850; Teignmouth, England
- Died: August 26, 1917 (aged 66); Ottawa, Ontario
- Known for: architect

John William Hurrell Watts RCA was born in Teignmouth, England on September 16, 1850. He emigrated to Canada in 1873. He was the first curator of the Royal Canadian Academy of Arts' National Gallery. As an architect, he also designed Fleck/Paterson House, St Augustine's and Booth House. He was a founding member of the Ontario Association of Architects.

Four small etchings by Watts were featured in the first Royal Canadian Academy of Arts (RCA) exhibition in March 1880. He was part of the Etching Revival Movement, which was virtually unknown in Canada, and was perhaps the first practising etcher to display his work in Canada. He taught the technique to artists William Brymner and Ernest Fosbery.

Watts worked across disciplines as an artist and a curator. An important figure in the Ottawa arts community, he served as the first curator of the National Gallery of Canada. Watts also directed the RCA Diploma Program, which included acquisitions for the Academy's collection as well as exhibition design between 1882 and 1897. As a creative, Watts was not limited to etching and took up watercolor, oil painting, and even architecture, designing a number of homes in the capital region.

After his death in 1917, Watts gifted his etching press and tools to Fosbery, who became a celebrated etcher and teacher in his own right.
