= York station (disambiguation) =

York railway station is the main railway station in York, England.

York station may also refer to:

- York railway station (1841), the former station in York, England, United Kingdom
- York railway station, Western Australia, a former station in York, Western Australia], Australia
- York–Dauphin station, a rapid transit station in Philadelphia, Pennsylvania, United States

== See also ==
- York Street station (disambiguation)
- York (disambiguation)
