= Goodwin House (Ottawa) =

Heritage building in Canada

Coordinates: 45.426758°N 75.678538°W

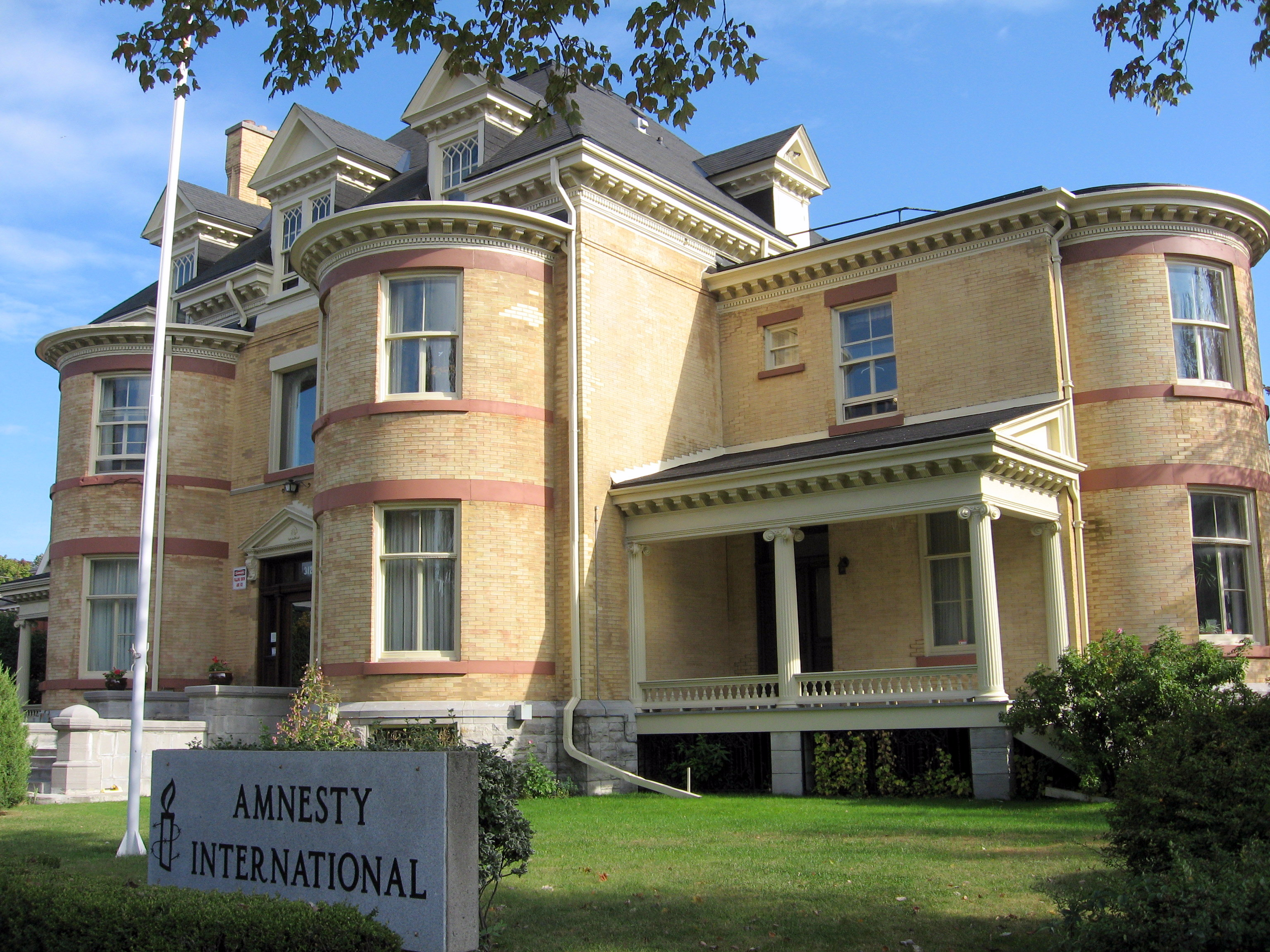

Goodwin House is a prominent heritage building in Ottawa, Ontario, Canada. Located at 312 Laurier Avenue East it was built by railway executive George Goodwin from 1899 to 1900. It is one of the largest mansions ever built in the city. It later became a convent for the Grey Nuns, and during the Second World War was used as the headquarters of the Canadian Women's Army Corps. In 1978 it was bought and restored by St. John Ambulance, which used it as its national headquarters. Recently it was sold to Amnesty International which today uses it as its Canadian headquarters.

== See also ==
- List of designated heritage properties in Ottawa
