= York Street station (disambiguation) =

York Street station may refer to:

- York Street railway station, in Belfast, Northern Ireland, United Kingdom
- York Street station (IND Sixth Avenue Line), a subway station in New York City, United States
- York Street station (New Brunswick), a former railway station in Fredericton, New Brunswick, Canada
- York Street station (Tampa), a streetcar stop in Tampa, Florida, United States
- York Street/Freemason station, a light rail station in Norfolk, Virginia, United States

== See also ==
- York Street (disambiguation)
- York station (disambiguation)
