= Plant Bath =

Public baths in Ottawa, Canada

Coordinates: 45.407825°N 75.714555°W

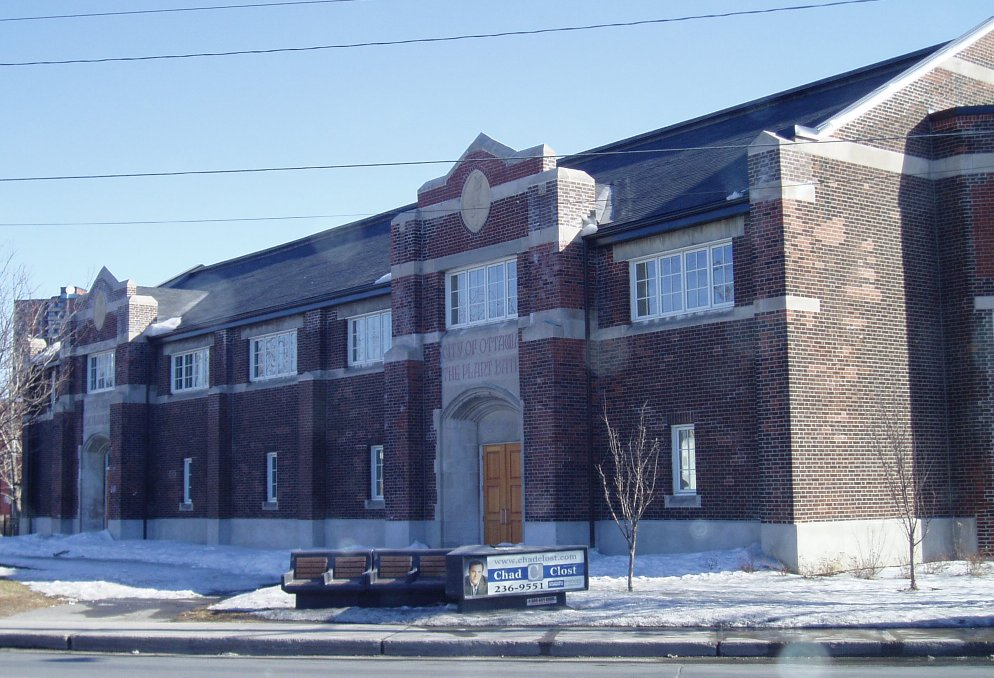
The Plant Bath at 930 Somerset Street West (2005)

Plant Bath, located in Ottawa, Canada.

The Plant Bath is a historical bath in Ottawa, Ontario, Canada. It was built along with the Champagne Bath in 1924 to try to improve the hygiene and well-being of the city's lower classes. It was named after Frank H. Plant, then mayor of Ottawa. It is located at 930 Somerset Street West at the intersection with Preston Street. It is in the center of the Italian-Canadian community and near the Chinese-Canadian areas of the city.

== History ==
Plant Bath original design drawing, dated 16 May 1922

=== Pre-Construction ===
At the turn of the 20th century the Canadian Government and much of its population felt that Ottawa needed to transition from a glorified lumber town to a more modern urban center which could rival the likes of Montreal and Toronto while also reinforcing its significance as the nation's capital. This major shift in interest led to the development of a new urban-industrial working class and a bourgeoisie upper class. The extensive changes to Ottawa did not come easy. The upper class soon began expressing concerns of social problems such as crime, gambling, and prostitution. Despite defining these problems as primarily law-breaking act, it quickly became an umbrella term for any “immoral acts”. The idea of improving the hygiene of the working class was introduced by reformists as a means to moral cleanliness. This novel idea gained tremendous traction in 1918 with the Spanish flu epidemic. Within a few months, the flu had killed hundreds of working class citizens most of whom lived in today's Lowertown and LeBreton Flats sectors. The epidemic expanded on the original “moral cleanliness” intentions of the reformists by establishing a dire need for improving the health, safety, and vulnerability of the working class.

“Personal cleanliness, so vital as a hygienic measure, must be carried to the forefront in our battle for a more perfect sanitation. Perfect compliance of all classes of people with sanitary laws will aid materially in the prolongation of human life and lessen sorrow and suffering in the world. No argument is required to prove the necessity nor the present demand for public baths and no efforts should be instituted to thwart so great a public beneficence. Prompt action is demanded along this line of humanitarian work. Cleanliness means health; it means preservation of life; it means moral improvement; it means an uplift to all that is good and pure in the world.”

The Spanish Flu is generally recognized as the catalyst which solidified the decision to build two public baths, named Plant Bath and Champagne Bath, which as per the largest impact of the flu were built in Lowertown and LeBreton Flats respectively.

=== Post-Construction ===
Constructed in 1924, Plant Bath proved to be an immense success, remaining popular for decades. Throughout the years, the Bath, which included public restrooms, two change rooms with lockers, toilets, and showers, and a spectator gallery, hosted an extensive array of lessons, events, and competitions. From the moment of opening, Plant Bath solidified itself as a staple of the community. The strong impact it had was demonstrated in 1933 following an economic crisis which prompted the mayor to propose closing the bath. However, following significant pushback from patrons paired with a protest led by the Local Council of Women, the Baths were saved from closure. However, the economic value of Plant continued to be debated throughout the 1940s and 1950s due to the financial strain it put on the city. While the Bath was not financially profitable, the community argued its significant other benefits. Plant Bath provided important hygienic, mental and physical services to the working class. Additionally, the thousands of children and adults alike who learned to swim at the pool indicated the facility was important for the community's safety.

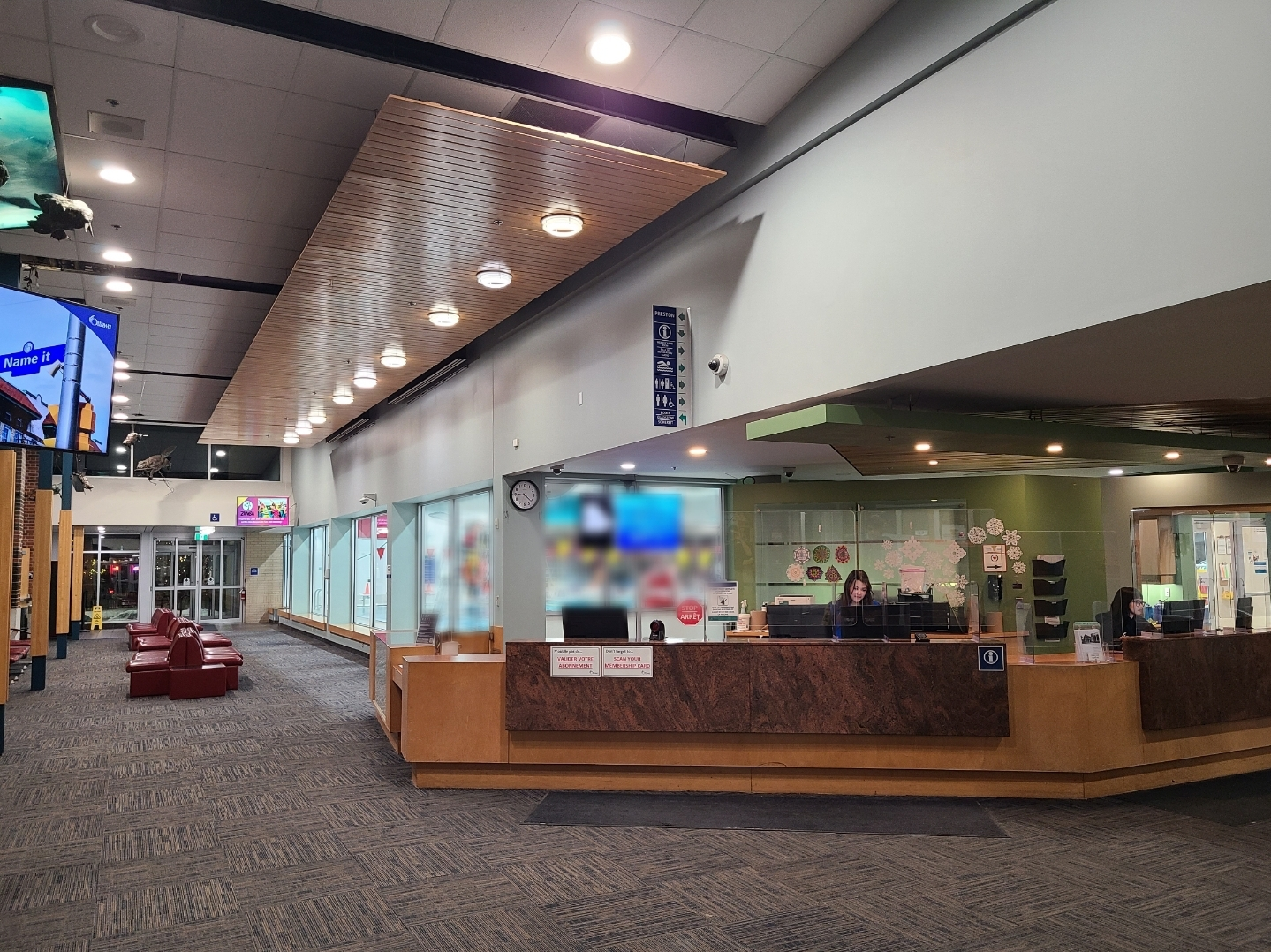
Plant Recreation Centre Interior (2024)

=== Evolving Purpose ===
During the 1980s the city began investing more in leisure and activities which prompted Plant Bath to undergo major renovations in 1983 and 1984 which converted the Baths primary use from hygiene and exercise to leisure and fun. This renovation came with the addition of a lounge, solar water heating, a water slide, sauna, patio chairs, Tarzan rope, cedar deck, and plants. In 1994 it was designated a heritage property, but three years later the building was closed for safety reasons. The brick pillars holding up the roof had eroded and there was some danger that the building could collapse. Repairs were estimated to cost millions of dollars and the baths remained closed for several years.

=== Reconstruction ===
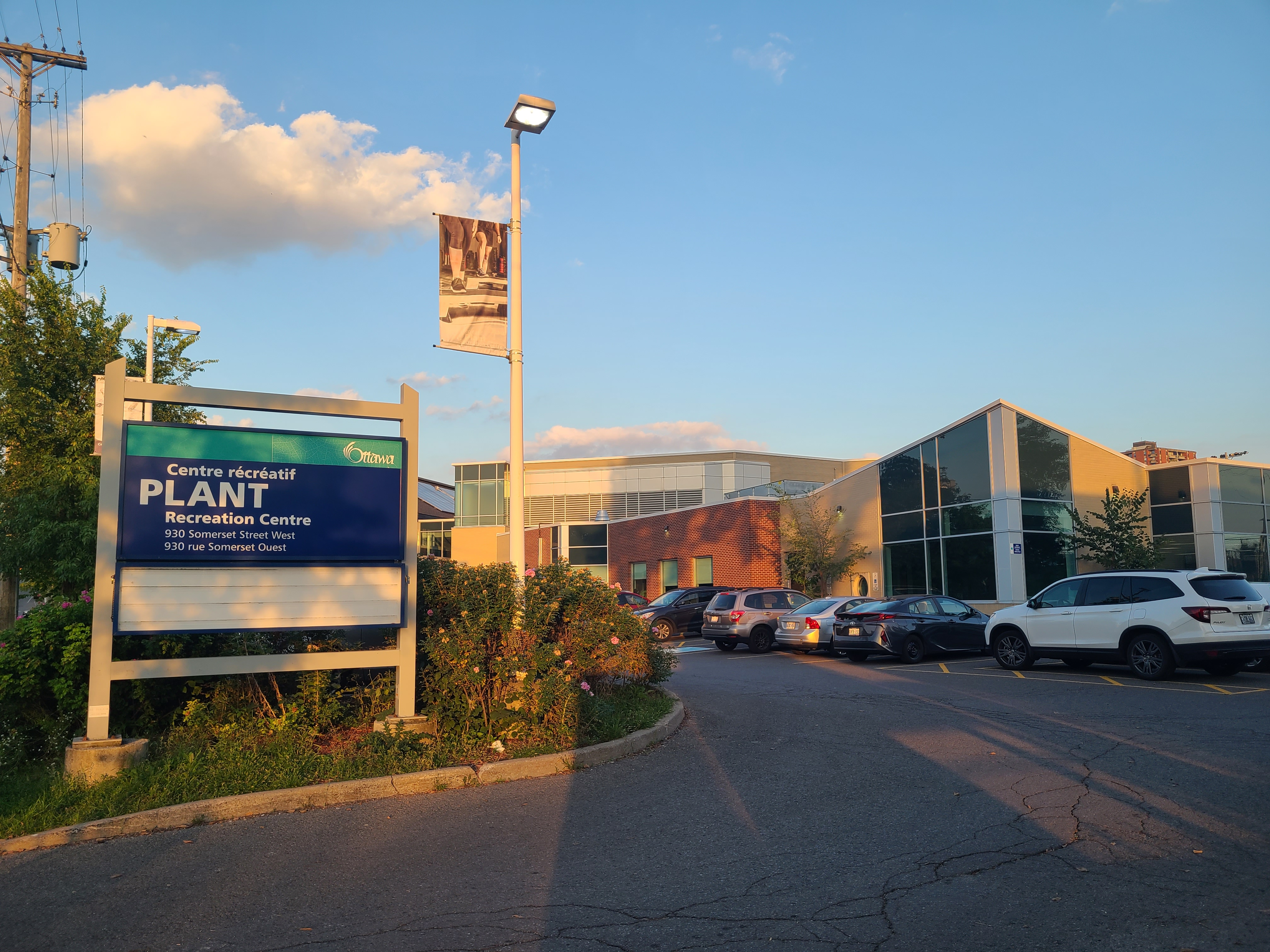
Plant Recreation Centre Exterior (2023)

In 2004, eight years after closing, a major refurbishment and expansion project which had begun four years earlier was completed. The old plant bath was converted into meeting rooms and a venue hall, while the new development added two new pools; a 25 meter lap pool and a shallow leisure pool, as well as a hot tub and steam room. For patrons to prepare, three change rooms were built, with showers, bathrooms, changing stalls and lockers. Finally, in addition to a large lobby complete with public restrooms, viewing windows and art works, a fitness gym was built to provide further exercise opportunities to patrons. Since its construction in 2004 the new Plant Recreation Centre remains a vital and recognized part of Ottawa's centrum.

== See also ==
- List of designated heritage properties in Ottawa
