= Champagne Bath =

Public bath house in Ottawa, Canada

Coordinates: 45.430681°N 75.686687°W

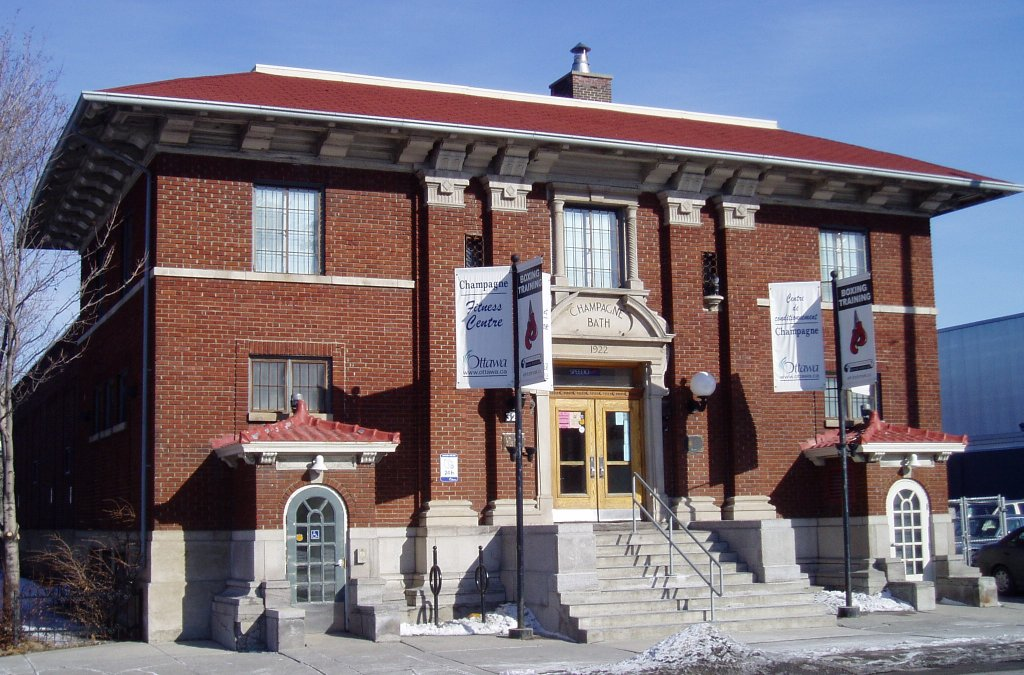
The Champagne Bath at 321 King Edward

The Champagne Bath, officially the Champagne Fitness Centre, is a historic public bath in Ottawa, Ontario, Canada. It is located at 321 King Edward Avenue in Lower Town.

Originally, the structure was built to enhance the hygiene of the largely working-class residents of the neighbourhood, many of whom had no baths in their homes. The structure was also originally home to a library. Work began on the building in 1921, and it was completed in 1924. The building, a blend of the Spanish Colonial Revival and Prairie Styles, was designed by Werner Ernst Noffke. It was named after Ottawa mayor Napoléon Champagne. It was Ottawa's first municipal swimming pool and was one of the first indoor pools in Canada. The pool was also unusual in that it used salt water, which meant it did not need to be chlorinated. It was soon followed by the Plant Bath, which was built on the western side of town.

It was segregated by sex until 1967, with separate ground level entrances for women and men. While popular for many years, usage declined as the facility aged. In the 1980s, after the completion of the Le Patro facility, the city proposed closing the Champagne Bath. After the public protest, it was decided to renovate instead, at the cost of approximately two million dollars. The newly renovated facility reopened in 1990.

== See also ==
- List of designated heritage properties in Ottawa
- Baths and wash houses in Britain
