= Forum Asset Management =

Canadian investment firm

- Company type: Private
- Industry: Private Markets
- Founder: Richard Abboud
- Headquarters: Toronto, Canada
- Area served: North America
- Key people: Richard Abboud(CEO); Tate Abols; Aly Damji
- Services: Investment Management
- Website: forumam.com

Forum Asset Management is a Canadian investment firm specializing in private markets and alternative assets including real estate, private equity, and infrastructure.

== History ==
Founded in 1996 and based in Toronto, the firm focuses on innovation, sustainability, and community impact. Forum was founded by Richard Abboud, who serves as the company's CEO. In 2024, he received the title of CEO of the Year from the Ontario Chamber of Commerce.

Forum manages residential and commercial properties with assets currently valued at more than $4 billion including a $200 million self-storage fund under "Make Space Storage," which it acquired in January 2024.

In July 2022, the firm assisted in the second instalment of a growth equity investment in Broadlinc, a US-based digital media company.

In 2023, Forum donated $125,000 to the University of Guelph’s Lang School of Business real estate program to support industry-related education.

== Student housing ==
Forum has sought to position themselves as industry leaders in the construction of student housing. In December 2024, Forum acquired Alignvest Student Housing REIT in a deal valued at $1.7 billion. This transaction is noted as one of the largest in the Canadian student housing market. In the spring of 2025 a Forum-owned student housing development in Guelph ran into trouble over the charging of development fees.
