= Fleck/Paterson House =

House in Ottawa, Canada

Fleck/Patterson House
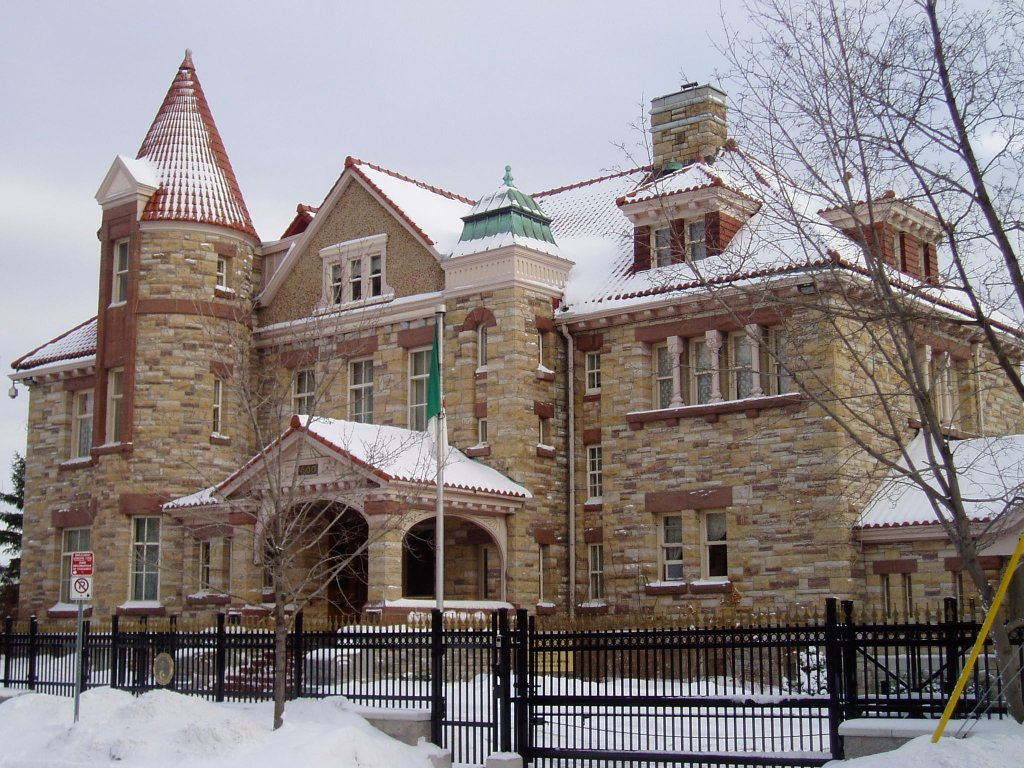
- Fleck/Paterson House; currently the Algerian Embassy in Ottawa.
- Location: Ottawa
- Address: 500 Wilbrod Street
- Coordinates: 45.4303°N 75.6733°W
- Ambassador: Hocine Meghar

Fleck/Paterson House is a historic building in Ottawa, Ontario, Canada. Built in 1903 as a private residence, it has since served a number of functions, and currently serves as the Algerian Embassy to Canada since 2002.

== History ==
The house was built between 1901 and 1903 by Ottawa lumber baron J.R. Booth who built it for his daughter Gertrude and her husband Andrew Fleck. It was designed by John W.H. Watts, who also designed Booth House. Gertrude Fleck lived there until her death in 1940 when it was purchased by Senator Norman Paterson who lived in it until his death in 1983.

After Paterson's death, the house was bought by developers who hoped to turn it into a retirement home. These efforts fell through, however, and the house was left abandoned for a number of years. It fell victim to vandalism and water damage before being bought by local developer Robert Van Eyk in 1989 for some $1.3 million with the plan to turn it into a bed and breakfast. However, since the building was zoned only for residential purposes, the city blocked this plan. In 1992, the building was sold to Maharishi Heaven on Earth Development Corp. for just over a million dollars. They hoped to turn the structure into a meditation centre and headquarters of the Natural Law Party of Canada. Extensive renovations, reportedly costing almost two million dollars, were undertaken and the building was fully restored.

== Algerian embassy ==
In 2002, the Maharishi Corp. sold the building for $2.95 million to Algeria. This was one of the highest prices ever paid for a house in Ottawa, and the highest price ever paid for a heritage home in the city.

== See also ==
- Algeria–Canada relations
