= Maharishi Peace Palace =

Religious building

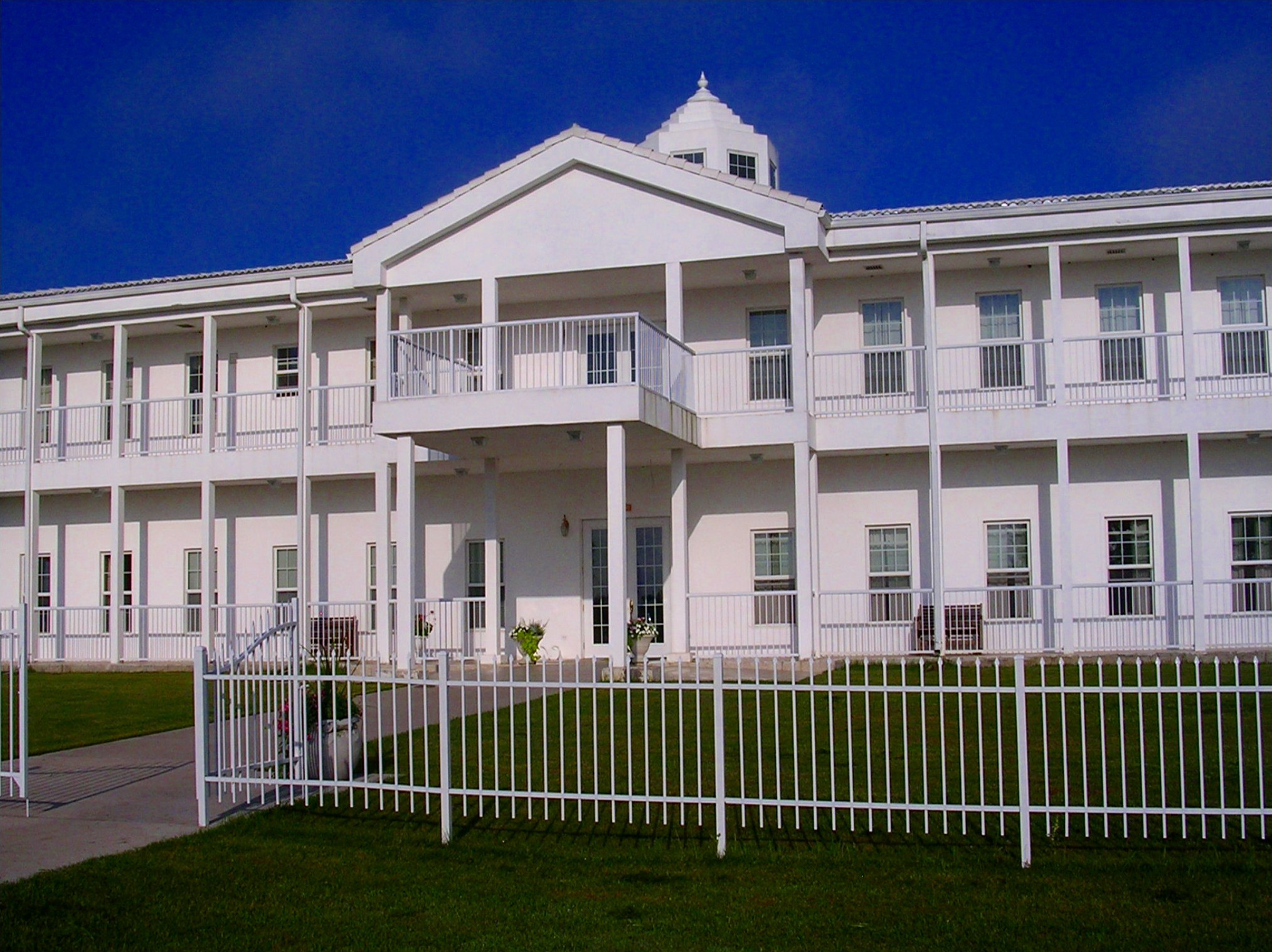
The Maharishi Peace Palace in Fairfield, Iowa

Maharishi Peace Palace is a type of pre-engineered building designed to house the educational and meditational activities of the Transcendental Meditation movement. Each Peace Palace is built using standardized plans compatible with Maharishi Sthapatya Veda design principles.

In 2000, Maharishi Mahesh Yogi announced his aspiration to build thousands of Peace Palaces around the world. Proposed locations in the United States have included the cities of Atlanta, Denver, New York City, Minneapolis, Long Island, Colorado Springs, Los Angeles, Charlottesville, Pittsburgh, Boston, Tulsa, and San Francisco. In addition, construction has been proposed for Ottawa, Ontario and Montreal, Quebec in Canada; Auckland, New Zealand, and the cities of Birmingham, Coventry, Glasgow, Newcastle, Sunderland, Rendlesham and Middlesbrough in the UK. As of 2007, 52 parcels had been acquired by the Global Country of World Peace (GCWP) and construction was planned via tax-free bonds obtained through the Colorado Health Facilities Authority as well as private investors. As of 2013, eight peace palaces have been completed in the United States.

== Planning, design and reception ==
In 2000, the Maharishi announced his aspirations to build one or more Peace Palaces in each of the 3,000 largest cities around the world. A 2006 prospectus for the TM movement's Raam bond specified 5,000 peace palaces worldwide. Another plan called for 2,400 buildings but was later reduced to 100 or 200 in the USA and 14 in Canada.

"Maharishi Peace Palace" is described as a "pre-engineered", MSV-designed building. Plans are available for four sizes, the "medium" option being a 12,000-square-foot (1,100 m^{2}), two-story building with a white, painted or marble-clad exterior. Depending on its size and other factors, a peace palace might include a spa facility, dormitory, meditation room, lecture hall, meeting room, a Maharishi Ayurveda shop, and a library. The peace palaces are intended to replace rental properties currently housing the TM movement's teaching centers, retail outlets, and spas. They have been called "Maharishi Enlightment Centers" or "Maharishi Invincibility Centers" or "Peace Palaces". Some could be connected with organic farming operations, either on-site or at nearby rural locations.

Film director and TM benefactor David Lynch said a Peace Palace is a "peace factory" rather than a "pretty building". An article in The New York Times described a peace palace as "an Indian temple crossed with a Southern plantation mansion" with their consistent appearance being part of a branding effort. Critics claim that the plan is aimed at increasing the Maharishi's financial assets and doubt that the hundreds or thousands of proposed Palaces would be built, while a possible lack of interest in the Peace Palaces might be attributed to the Maharishi's death. A spokesman at the Maharishi's funeral in 2008 said that the construction of peace palaces would remain a top priority.

== Financing and construction ==
In 2007, The New York Times reported that 52 parcels had been acquired for Peace Palaces. They are being built in the US by the Global Country of World Peace (GCWP) and overseen by the Maharishi Vedic Education Development Corporation (MVEDC), as well as by private partners. David Lynch initiated an effort in 2003 to raise $1 billion for palace construction. In 2007, the GCWP applied to the Colorado Health Facilities Authority, a private group that serves as a vehicle for financing construction by non-profit healthcare institutions, for an issue of $55 million in tax-exempt bonds to finance construction of Peace Palaces in 21 cities, and the purchase of an organic farm in Goshen, New York. The GCWP would be responsible for the debt and interest. In order to get IRS approval for the tax-exempt bond, the GCWP had to get endorsements from the city councils or state authorities of the jurisdictions where it planned to build. A 2008 report states that $40 million was borrowed to build nine Peace Palaces, and was secured with $250 million in real estate assets.

Those who finance the construction of Peace Palaces are called "Founders of World Peace". In at least some cases, the Palaces are intended to run on a for-profit basis with returns going to investors. Two or three Palaces have been built by private individuals.

== Completed buildings ==
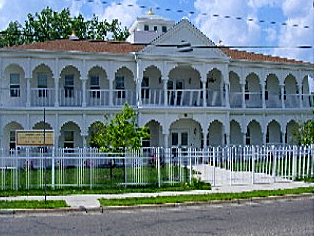
Maharishi Peace Palace in St. Paul, MN.

Peace Palaces have been completed in at least twelve locations:

- Lexington, Kentucky. Located on the University of Kentucky's Coldstream Research Campus, it opened in April 2003. It was built by TM-advocate and oil broker Howard Settle at a cost of $4 million. It also houses his corporate offices.
- The Woodlands, Texas (suburb of Houston) It was also built by Settle and he has office space there.
- Rockville, Maryland (suburb of Washington, D.C.) It opened in May 2003.
- Fairfield, Iowa Two have been built on the MUM campus, one which is dedicated to instruction in Transcendental Meditation, and the other which is the Integrative Wellness Center.
- Maharishi Vedic City, Iowa It is located at the Brahmasthan of the city and is owned by the GCWP.
- St. Paul, Minnesota The title to the building is held by the GCWP.
- Livingston Manor, New York (in the Catskill Mountains) Two buildings have been built, two more are planned.
- Erfurt, Germany
- Istanbul, Turkey
- Kuala Lumpur, Malaysia
- Rendlesham, England
- Island of Peace, Ireland
- Edinburgh, Scotland

== Proposed locations and buildings ==
=== United States ===
- 12 Peace Palace buildings were proposed at geographical centerpoint of America in rural Kansas.
- In 2005, the GCWP purchased a 27-acre (110,000 m^{2}) property west of Lincoln, Nebraska. The Prairie Peace Park had been inaugurated there years earlier but it was never developed beyond some large sculptures. At the time, local GCWP organizer Eric Michener, said the Palace would encourage peace by enlivening "the underlying field of consciousness, the consciousness of peace". The plans were dropped in 2009 due to lack of funds.
- A proposal for a Peace Palace in unincorporated Manakin-Sabot, Virginia, was submitted to the Goochland County Design Review Committee in 2008. It would be built on a 1.5-acre (6,100 m^{2}) lot across the street from Satterwhite's Restaurant.
- In Ohio, Parma, Westlake, and Mayfield Heights were proposed locations. The "Maharishi's organization" sued the city of Mayfield Heights when it was not granted a setback variance that was granted to "corporate offices".
- Moon, Pennsylvania, is another site proposed for a Peace Palace. The GCWP bought a 7.4-acre (30,000 m^{2}) lot in 2005 and applied for approval in 2007. It also sought an endorsement from the county supervisors in order to qualify for a tax-exempt bond to finance the project.
- In 2007, a Peace Palace was proposed at a 19.3-acre (78,000 m^{2}) lot on the site of the former Flagship Inn, at the intersection of Interstate 30 and Texas Highway 360, in Arlington, Texas, which had been purchased by the Maharishi in 1993.
- There was a proposal to build a $4.5 million Peace Palace next to the MAPI Headquarters in Colorado Springs.
- Two Peace Palaces were proposed for the Philadelphia area, and properties were purchased, but the Palaces remained unbuilt as of 2006.
- The movement vacated spacious, but inauspicious, quarters near the Pacific Ocean in Los Angeles, California, and moved into a cramped office building on a busy street while trying to find an affordable and auspicious lot to build a Peace Palace. The effort was announced in a 2003 press conference that included movement leaders and celebrity meditators.
- A Peace Palace was suggested as the centerpiece of a planned community in Wellington, Colorado, called "Shanti Village", the brainchild of a person not affiliated with the Global Country of World Peace.

Other US locations include New York City, Atlanta, Denver, Minneapolis, Long Island, Charlottesville, Pittsburgh, Boston, Tulsa, Hamden, Connecticut, and the San Francisco Bay area.

=== United Kingdom ===
In February 2008, MSV Homes submitted plans to build a £2 million, three-story, 33-bedroom Peace Palace in Rendlesham, Suffolk. It would be part of the 30-home, 24-apartment Maharishi Peace Colony. The plans were approved two months later, despite community concerns. The building will replace a center in Badingham that was used for 25 years. According to a 2013 report in British news service, fundraising is underway and construction is expected to begin at year end. Additional peace palaces have been proposed for Birmingham, Coventry, Glasgow, Newcastle, Sunderland, Rendlesham and Middlesbrough in the UK.

=== Other countries ===
In addition, peace palaces have been proposed for Ottawa, Ontario, Montreal, Teufelsberg in Germany and Auckland, New Zealand.
