= Devonshire Community Public School =

Coordinates: 45°24′20.1″N 75°43′08.5″W

Location
- 100 Breezehill Avenue North; Ottawa, Ontario; Canada

Information
- School board: Ottawa Carleton District School Board
- Grades: JK-6
- Enrollment: 380
- Language: English, French
- Campus: Urban
- Colours: Red, Blue and White
- Communities served: Hintonburg, Mechanicsville, Centretown, Lebreton Flats and Civic Hospital

Devonshire Community Public School is an elementary school in Ottawa, Ontario, Canada. It is part of the Ottawa-Carleton District School Board (OCDSB). Located at 100 Breezehill Avenue North, the school provides single-track Early French Immersion (EFI) programming for the surrounding Hintonburg, Mechanicsville, Centretown, Lebreton Flats and Civic Hospital neighbourhoods. Their mission is to provide each child with the opportunity to achieve their potential and become fluent in a second language.

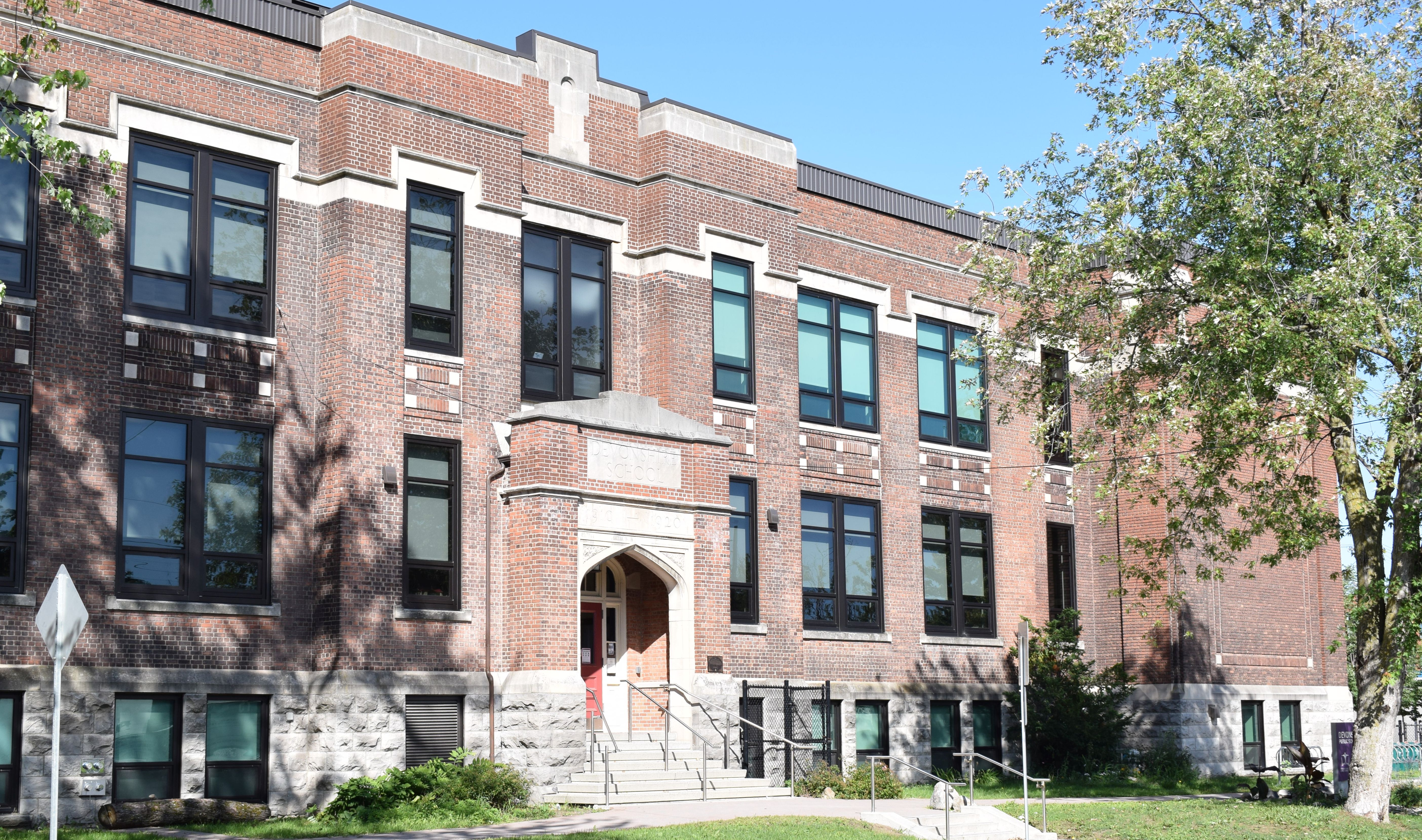
Front facing of the Devonshire Community Public School, at 101 Breezehill Avenue North, Ottawa, Ontario
