= Gordon S. Lang School of Business and Economics =

Business school of the University of Guelph, Ontario, Canada

Coordinates: 43.5322°N 80.2269°W

University of Guelph Gordon S. Lang School of Business and Economics
- Former names: College of Business and Economics (2006–2019)
- Motto: Business as a force for good
- Type: Public business school
- Established: May 1, 2006 (20 years ago)
- Parent institution: University of Guelph
- Dean: Sara Mann
- Location: Guelph, Ontario, Canada
- Website: uoguelph.ca/lang

The Gordon S. Lang School of Business and Economics (formerly the College of Business and Economics) is the business school of the University of Guelph, in Guelph, Ontario, Canada. After receiving a $21-million donation from Stu and Kim Lang, the College was renamed to the Gordon S. Lang School of Business and Economics on April 3, 2019, honouring Stu's late father. In 2026, a further $51 million was donated by Stu and Kim Lang, the largest-ever donation to a Canadian business school.

Overseeing the transformation of the business school, was dean Dr. Julia Christensen Hughes. Under her leadership Guelph's business school differentiated itself by committing to "being and developing leaders for a sustainable world". The school's MBA was ranked in the top ten in the world by Corporate Knights. The current dean of the school is Dr. Sara Mann, who was appointed in February 2024 for a 5-year term.

== Academics ==
The Gordon S. Lang School of Business and Economics offers a wide range of programs which also include co-operative education experiences. The School offers undergraduate, graduate and executive development programs as well as many courses through the University of Guelph's open learning office. Lang also offers all of the required courses for the Certified Human Resources Professional (CHRP) designation and Certified Management Accountant (CMA) certification. Their accounting program is certified by the Chartered Professional Accountant of Ontario (CPA) designation.

=== Undergraduate programs ===
The undergraduate programs that are offered through Lang are:

- Bachelor of Commerce Honours (B.Comm.)
  - Accounting
  - Food and Agricultural Business
  - Government, Economics and Management
  - Hospitality and Tourism Management
  - Management
  - Management, Economics and Finance
  - Marketing Management
  - Real Estate
  - Sport and Event Management
  - Undeclared (only available in semesters 1 and 2)
- Bachelor of Arts (B.A.)
  - Economics

=== Minors ===
The undergraduate minors that are offered through Lang are:

- Accounting
- Business Data Analytics
- Economics
- Entrepreneurship
- Human Resources
- International Business
- Marketing
- Project Management
- Sport and Event Management
- Sustainable Business

=== Graduate programs ===
The graduate programs that are offered through Lang are:

- Graduate Diploma in Accounting
- Graduate Diploma in Tourism Management
- Master of Science in Management
- Master of Science in Marketing and Consumer Studies
- Master of Science in Tourism and Hospitality
- Master of Arts in Economics (with finance specialization option)
- Master of Arts in Leadership
- Master of Business Administration in Hospitality and Tourism Management
- Master of Business Administration in Food and Agribusiness Management
- Master of Business Administration in Sustainable Commerce
- Master of Professional Accounting
- Master of Project Management
- PhD in Economics
- PhD in Management

=== Departments ===
The Gordon S. Lang School of Business and Economics has four different departments, which include:

- Department of Economics & Finance
- Department of Management
- Department of Marketing & Consumer Studies
- School of Hospitality, Food & Tourism Management

== Accreditations and rankings ==
- Association to Advance Collegiate Schools of Business (AACSB)
- Ranked in the top ten of Canadian business programs in Corporate Knights Survey for focus on corporate responsibility/sustainability
- Bachelor of Commerce in real estate and housing is one of only two such undergraduate programs in Canada
- School of Hospitality, Food and Tourism ranked 21st in the world and 1st in Canada for research output

== Student associations ==
- Gordon S. Lang School of Business and Economics Students' Association (LSA)
- Accounting Students' Association (ASA)
- Management Economics & Finance Students' Association (MEFSA)
- Management Students' Association (MSA)
- Hospitality & Tourism Management Students' Association (HTMSA)
- Marketing Management Students' Association (MMSA)
- Government, Economics and Management Association (GEMA)
- Real Estate Students' Association (RESA)
- Guelph Entrepreneurship Society (GES)
- ACE (formerly DECA U Guelph)
- Jeux du Commerce Guelph Guelph (JDCC Guelph)
- Guelph Women in Leadership (GWIL)
- Guelph Sports Management Association (GSMA)
- Guelph Student Sales Association (GSSA)
- Guelph Consulting Group
- My World, My Choice (MWMC)
- Guelph Student Investment Council (GSIC)
- Enactus

== Notable alumni ==
- Scott McGillivray
- Kim Parlee

== Gordon S. Lang ==
Gordon S. Lang founded CCL Industries in Toronto in 1951. Today, CCL is a global company, the majority of CCL's current sales come from abroad. The company's 2018 revenue exceeded $4.7B with more than 20,000 employees worldwide at over 167 production facilities in 39 countries. It is the largest label company in the world.
