= Maison Odillon Archambault =

Maison Odilon Archambault
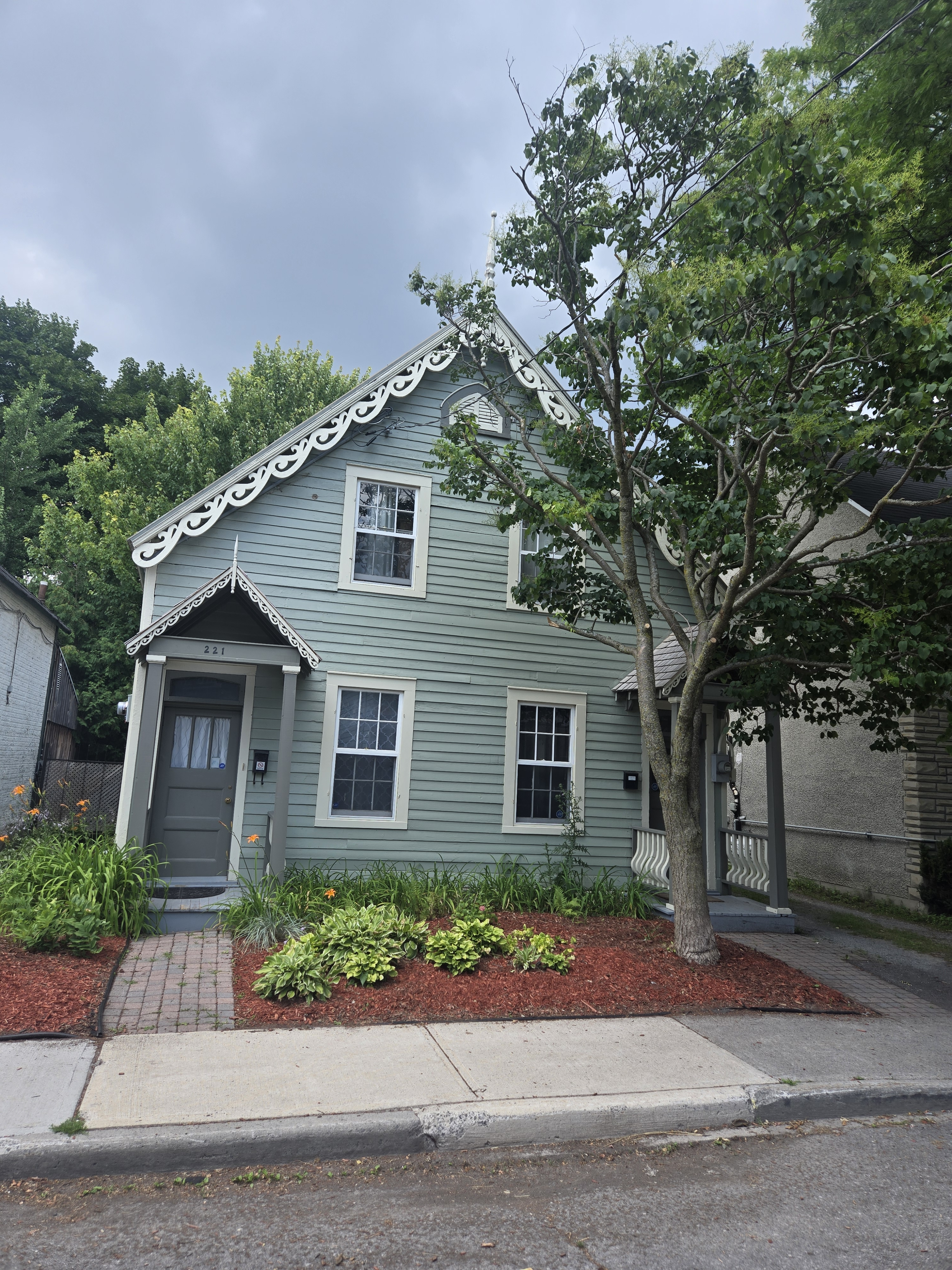
- Maison Odilon Achambault in Summer 2025
- Interactive map of Maison Odilon Archambault
- Location: Ontario, Canada
- Nearest city: Ottawa

History
- Built: 1875
- Original use: Residence

Site notes
- Current use: Residence
- Governing body: City of Ottawa

Maison Odilon Archambault is an historic house located in Ottawa, Ontario, Canada. The house was built in 1875 as the family home of Odilon Archambault, a cabinetmaker, drywall finisher, and carpenter that is said to have contributed to the interior decoration of the Notre-Dame Cathedral Basilica nearby. The house is now privately owned and it is a designated as a heritage building by the City of Ottawa.

The architecture of the house is simple and unpretentious, as many similar wood framed buildings Lower Town built around this time were. However, this building features some interesting heritage elements like gable ornamentation and a finial on the gable's peak.

== Notable Residents ==
- Odilon Archambault, his wife Mélina Mirault, and their children (1875-1888).
- Philéas Bélanger
- Moïse Désilets (resided there 1898-1943)

== Text on Historical Designation Plaque ==
"This one-and-a-half story house, with its gabled facade and well-preserved clapboard siding, is adorned with a modest scrolled edge trim and finial. Built in 1875 by Odilon Achambault, a carpenter and also a messenger in the public service, this two-unit dwelling is reprasentative of the type of house built by working-class people in the lower town."
