= Booth House (Ottawa) =

Historic building in Ottawa, Ontario

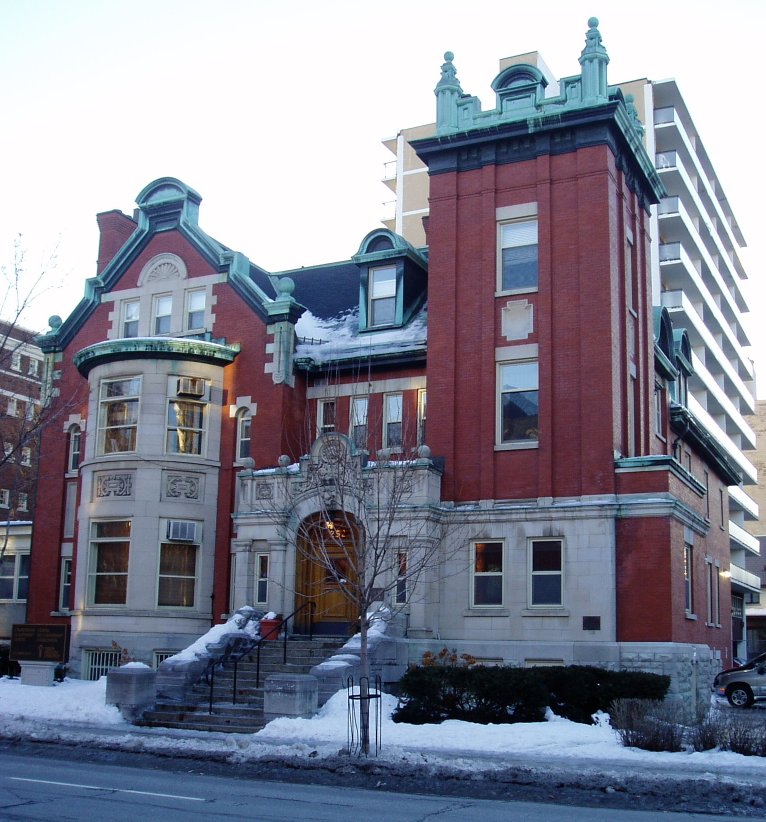
- Interactive map of Booth House
- Location: 252 Metcalfe Street; Ottawa, Ontario; K2P 1R3
- Coordinates: 45°24′59.2″N 75°41′31.9″W
- Built: 1906–09
- Original use: House owned by lumber baron John R. Booth
- Current use: Laurentian Leadership Centre
- Architect: John W.H. Watts
- Governing body: Parks Canada
- Website: Laurentian Leadership Centre

National Historic Site of Canada
- Official name: John R. Booth Residence National Historic Site of Canada
- Designated: November 16, 1990

Booth House is a prominent heritage building in Ottawa, Ontario, Canada located at 252 Metcalfe Street, just south of Somerset in Downtown Ottawa. The house was built by lumber baron John R. Booth in 1906, and it was designed by John W.H. Watts, who did a number of other Ottawa buildings.

It remained in the Booth family until 1947, when it then became home of the Laurentian Club, one of Ottawa's leading clubs. The club closed in 2000, however, and the property was bought by Trinity Western University to house its academic-internship program, the Laurentian Leadership Centre. It now houses Trinity Western students who are interning in various governmental, cultural, business, journalistic, or non-governmental offices.

On November 16, 1990, the building was designated a National Historic Site of Canada.
