= York Street Public School =

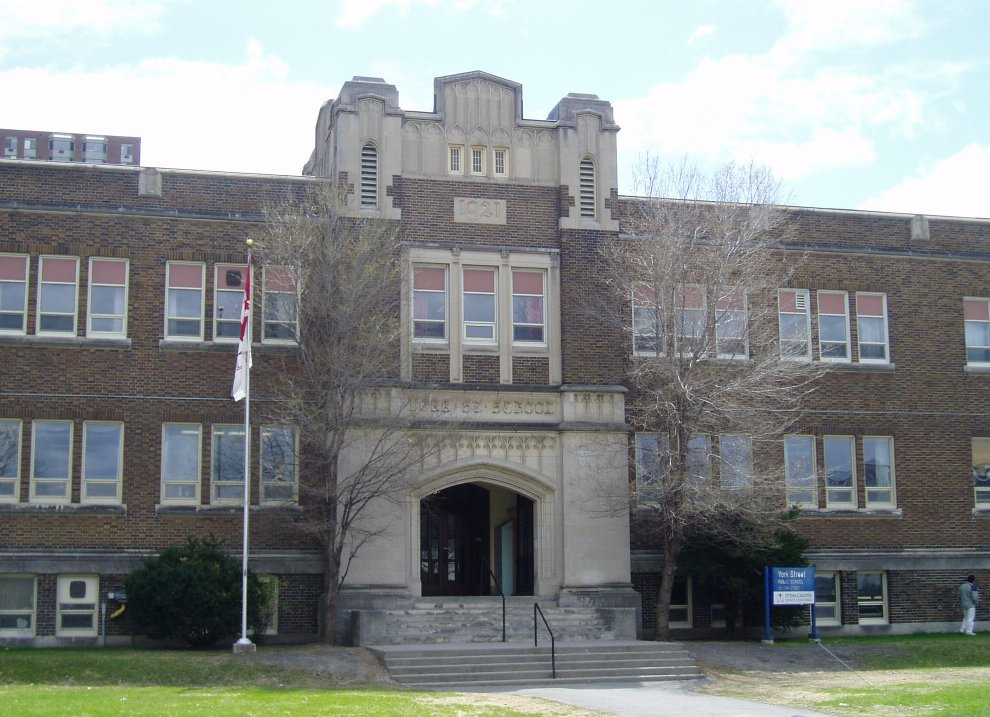

Location
- 310 York; Ottawa, Ontario, K1N 5V3; Canada; 45.432063°N 75.682905°W

Information
- Founded: 1921; 105 years ago
- School board: Ottawa Carleton District School Board
- Administrator: Rebecca Langley
- Principal: Jonathan Coupland
- Vice Principal: Meghan Burke
- Grades: JK-8
- Language: English, French
- Campus: urban
- Colour: Red White Black
- Mascot: Mustang
- Team name: Mustangs
- Communities served: Lower Town Laurier/King Edward/Cobourg area
- Feeder schools: R.E. Wilson Public School; Queen Mary Street Public School; Viscount Alexander Public School
- Website: www.yorkstreetps.ocdsb.ca

York Street Public School is an elementary school JK-8 in the Lower Town neighbourhood of Ottawa, Canada.

== History ==
York Street Public School is a large heritage school located in Lowertown, Ottawa in the Laurier/King Edward/Cobourg area. The school was built in 1921 and designed by the architect W.C. Beattie.

The school celebrated its 75th anniversary in 1996 and its 90th the 2011–2012 school year. It replaced four smaller schools in the area: Robinson Primary, George Street, Rideau Street, and Bolton. York Street School receives students from all different parts of the world. York Street holds a strong reputation in sports. Their volleyball and basketball do well and frequently receive banners. They also have been champions at the OCDSB's annual Math & Tech Competition in 2005.

York Street Public School plays a prominent role in the books of children's author Brian Doyle, who is a graduate.
