= Peacekeeping Monument =

War memorial in Ottawa, Canada

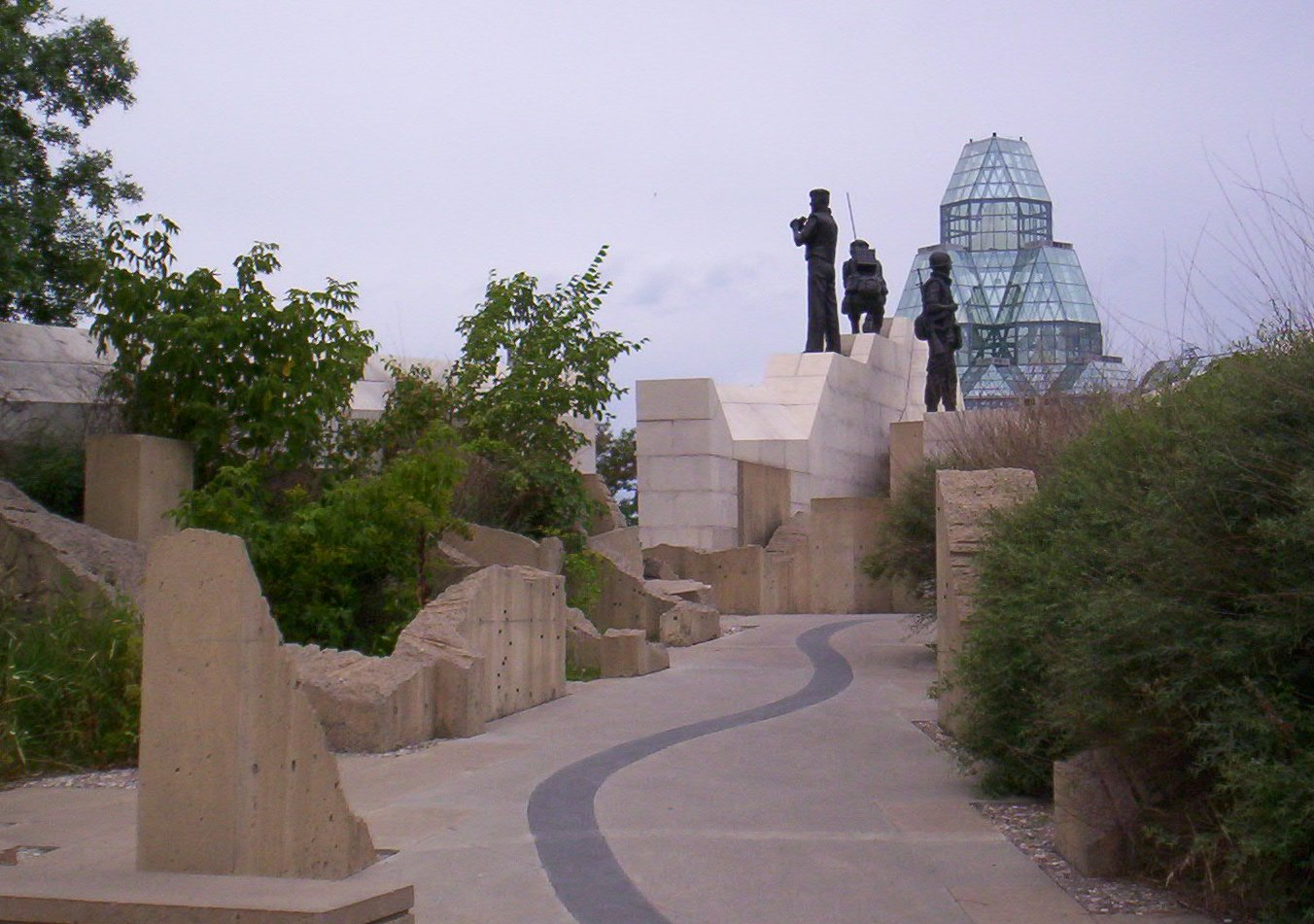
- The Peacekeeping Monument, seen from southeast; the National Gallery of Canada stands in the background
- Interactive map of Peacekeeping Monument
- Location: Ottawa, Ontario, Canada
- Coordinates: 45°25′43.58″N 75°41′47.49″W
- Designer: Jack Harman; Gregory Henriquez; Richard Henriquez; Cornelia Oberlander
- Type: War memorial
- Material: Bronze, concrete
- Completion date: 1992
- Dedicated to: Canada's peacekeeping forces

Reconciliation: The Peacekeeping Monument is a monument in Ottawa, the capital of Canada, commemorating Canada's role in international peacekeeping and the soldiers who have participated and are currently participating, both living and dead.

== Description ==
The monument is located in Ottawa, between St. Patrick Street and Murray Street, in the centre of the intersection where they meet Mackenzie Avenue and Sussex Drive; this places it just south of the National Gallery of Canada and just north of the American Embassy and Major's Hill Park. Artist Jack Harman built the three soldiers with architects Richard Henriquez and Gregory Henriquez designing the site concept, monument structures and the naming of the monument. Cornelia Oberlander was the landscape architect. The monument was completed in 1992.

The work, entitled Reconciliation, depicts three peacekeeping soldiers — two men and a woman — standing on two ridges of stone which cut through the broken debris of war and converge at a high point, which symbolizes the resolution which peacekeeping brings. The base of the monument includes Lester Pearson's 1956 quote "We need action not only to end the fighting but to make the peace... My own government would be glad to recommend Canadian participation in such a United Nations force, a truly international peace and police force", as well as the French translation.

In 1995, the monument was commemorated on the year's $1 coin, following the 1994 commemoration of the National War Memorial.

== Gallery ==
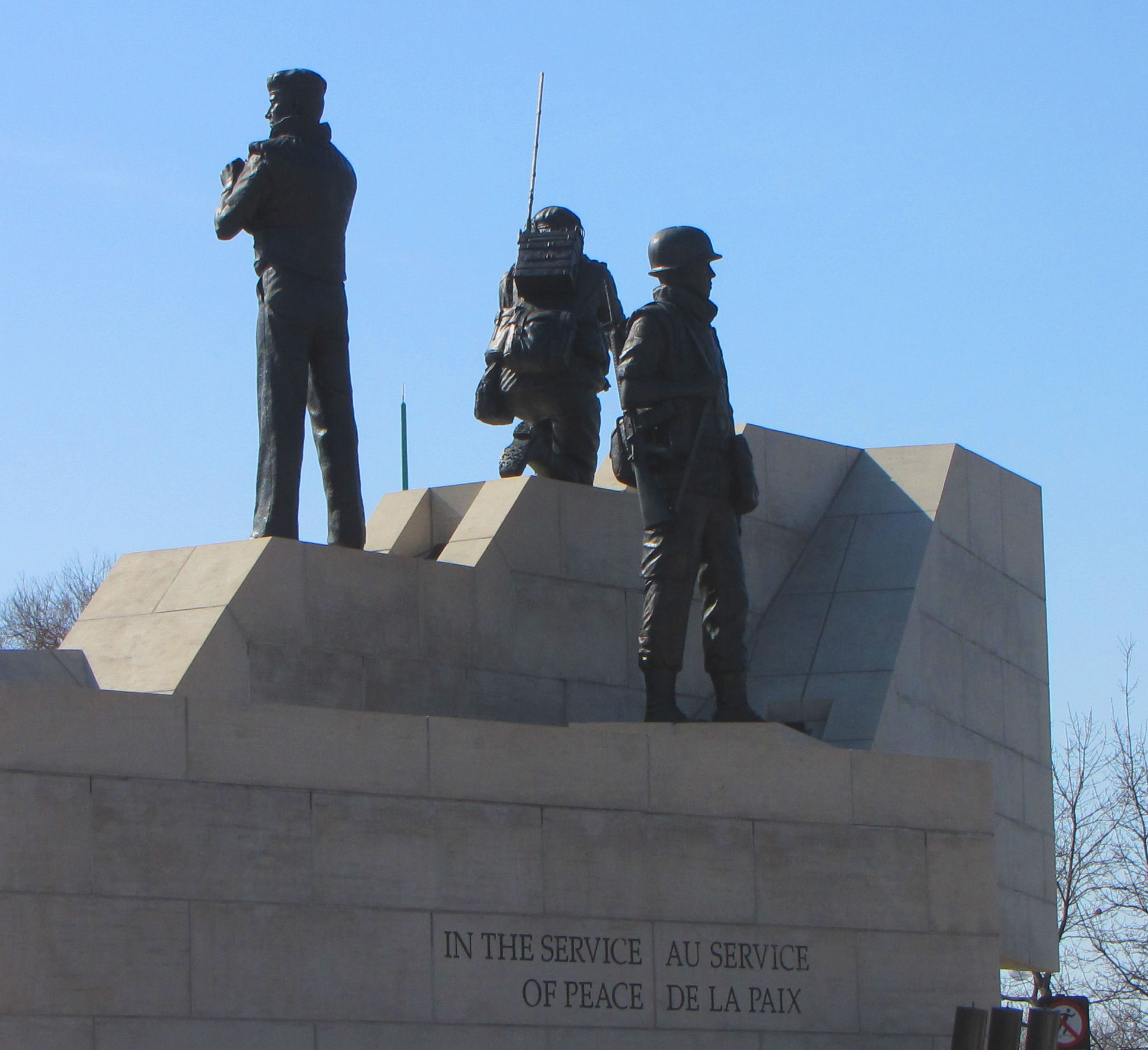
Closeup of figures and inscription

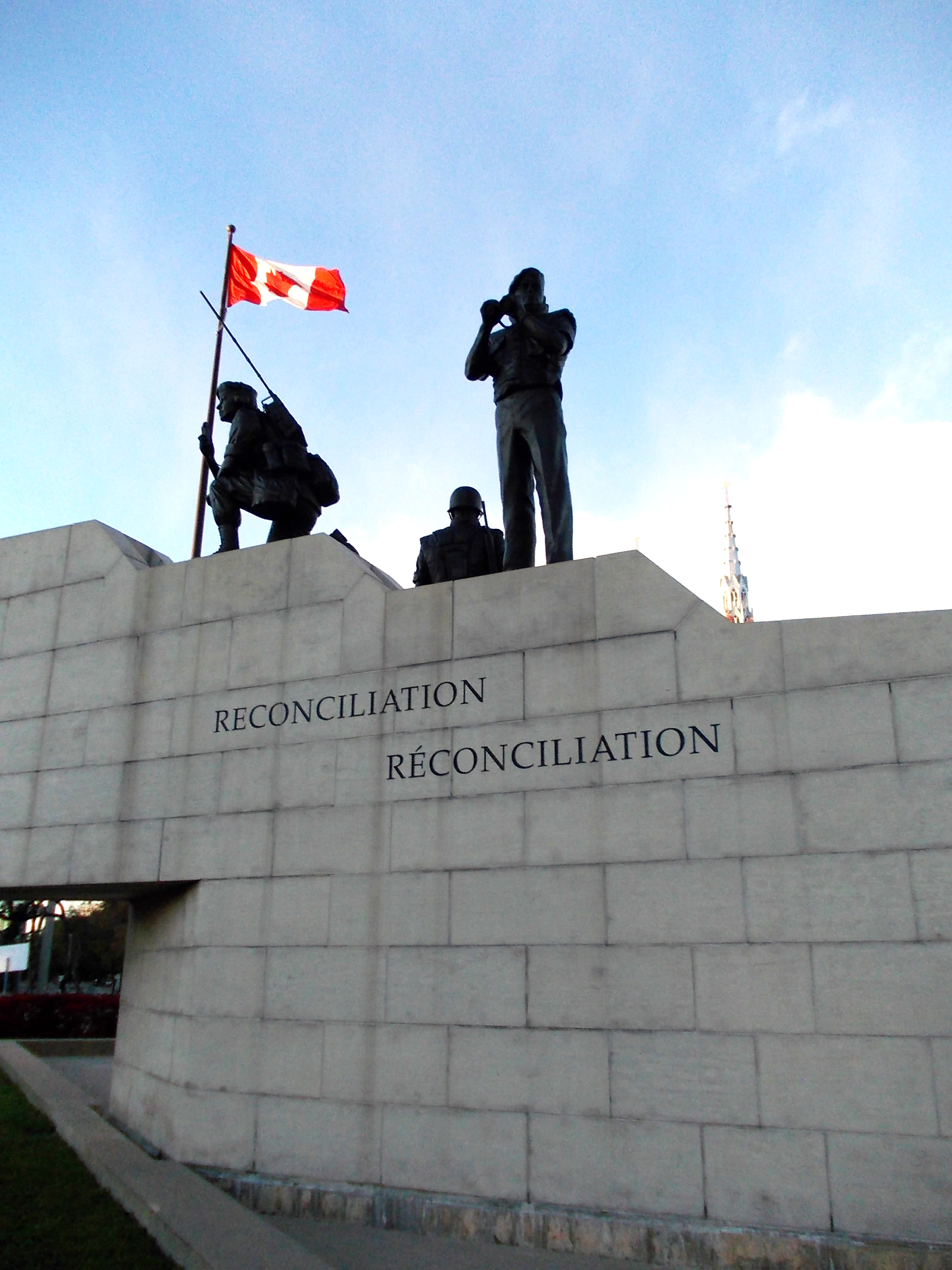
Another view of the figures

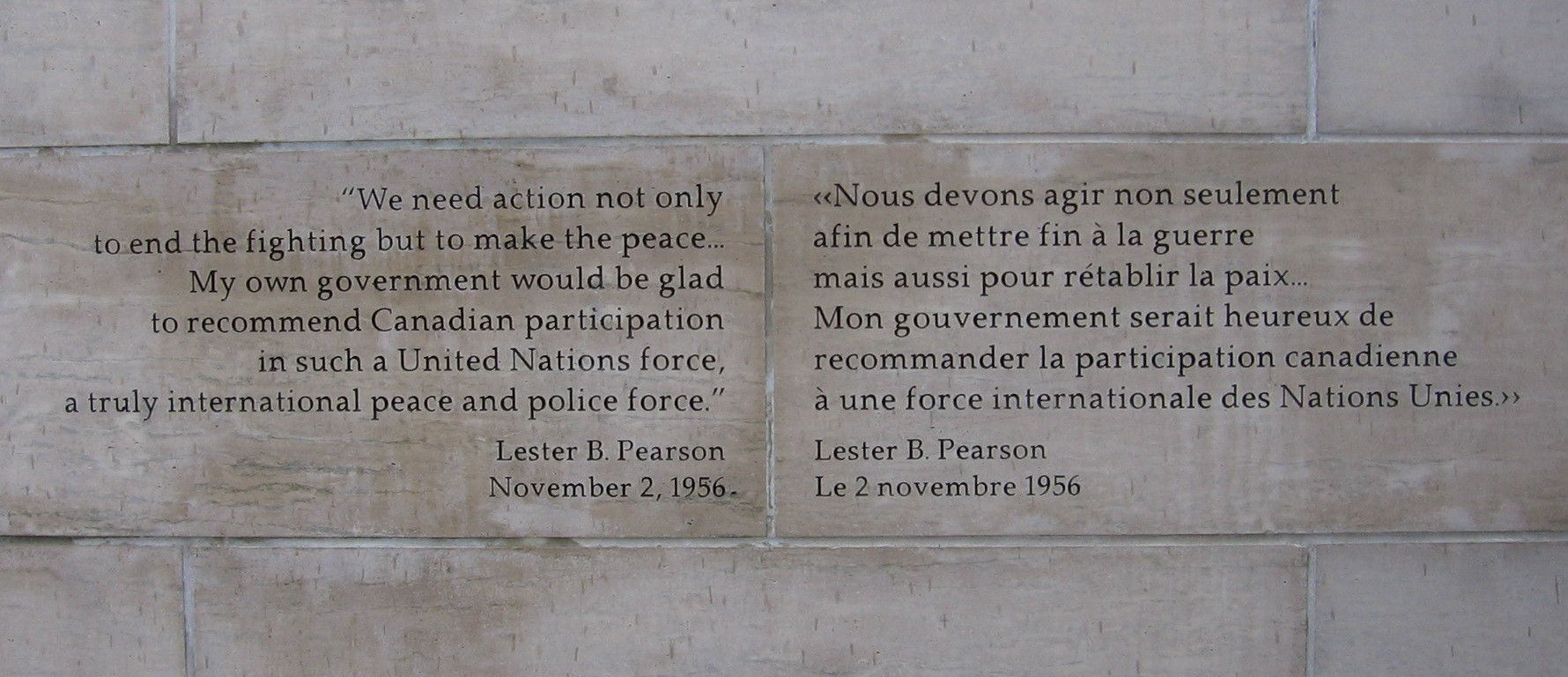
Quote from Lester Pearson on the monument

== See also ==
- Canadian Tomb of the Unknown Soldier
- National War Memorial (Canada)
- The Ottawa Memorial

== Sources ==
- Gough, P.J. (2002) ‘Invicta Pax’ Monuments, Memorials and Peace; an analysis of the Canadian Peacekeeping Monument, Ottawa, International Journal of Heritage Studies, 8, 3. pp. 201–223, ISSN 1352-7258.
