= List of National Historic Sites of Canada in Ottawa =

This is a list of National Historic Sites (French: Lieux historiques nationaux) in its capital city, Ottawa, Ontario. There are 27 National Historic Sites in Ottawa, of which two (Laurier House and the Rideau Canal) are administered by Parks Canada (identified below by the beaver icon). The Rideau Canal, which extends to Lake Ontario at Kingston, was designated in 1925 and was the first site designated in Ottawa.

There are six other National Historic Sites located within the National Capital Region, but not within Ottawa proper: the Former Almonte Post Office and Rosamond Woollen Mill in Almonte, the Gillies Grove and House in Arnprior, the Manoir Papineau in Montebello, the Symmes Hotel in the Aylmer sector of Gatineau, and the First Geodetic Survey Station in Chelsea.

Numerous National Historic Events also occurred in Ottawa, and are identified at places associated with them, using the same style of federal plaque which marks National Historic Sites. Several National Historic Persons are commemorated throughout the city in the same way. The markers do not indicate which designation—a Site, Event, or Person—a subject has been given. National Historic Sites located elsewhere in Ontario are listed at National Historic Sites in Ontario.

This list uses names designated by the national Historic Sites and Monuments Board, which may differ from other names for these sites.

* UNESCO World Heritage Site unit

== National Historic Sites ==
Site	Date(s)	Designated	Location	Description	Image
Aberdeen Pavilion	1898 (completed)	1983	Ottawa; 45°24′0.15″N 75°40′58.16″W	The only large-scale exhibition building in Canada surviving from the 19th century, and also the oldest surviving venue in which the Stanley Cup was contested	Image of the Aberdeen Pavilion during the Ottawa Exhibition in 2004
Beechwood Cemetery	1873 (established)	2000	Ottawa; 45.4469°N 75.6599°W	An exceptional example of 19th-century cemetery design, containing a concentration of mausolea, monuments, and markers of significant importance to the history of Canada, Ontario and Ottawa; the cemetery was declared the national cemetery of Canada in 2009. It has served as the national military cemetery since 1944 and the RCMP's national memorial cemetery since 2004.	A stone Celtic cross in Beechwood Cemetery
Billings House	1829 (completed)	1968	Ottawa; 45.389832°N 75.672235°W	One of Ottawa's oldest homes, this Georgian homestead was built by Braddish Billings, the first settler of Gloucester Township, where his home formed the nucleus of Ottawa's Billings Bridge area	Exterior view of the Billings House
Central Chambers	1891 (completed)	1990	Ottawa; 45°25′23.65″N 75°41′42.95″W	A noted example of Queen Anne Revival commercial architecture, with a high profile location on Confederation Square	Exterior view of the front facade of the Central Chambers building
Central Experimental Farm	1886 (established)	1997	Ottawa; 45.382537°N 75.713654°W	A rare example of a farm within a city; the site of significant scientific contributions to agriculture	Exterior view of the agricultural museum at the Central Experimental Farm
Château Laurier	1912 (completion of first wing)	1980	Ottawa; 45°25′32.04″N 75°41′42.39″W	One of Canada's landmark railway hotels, built in the distinctly Canadian Château-style; dubbed the "Third Chamber of Parliament" due to its proximity to Parliament Hill	Exterior view of the west facade of the Château Laurier
Confederation Square	1939 (established)	1984	Ottawa; 45°25′26.72″N 75°41′43.8″W	The second most important ceremonial centre in Ottawa, after Parliament Hill, with Canada's National War Memorial at its centre and the Valiants Memorial at its periphery, and framed by the Château Laurier, the Government Conference Centre, the National Arts Centre, the Central Chambers, the Scottish-Ontario Chambers, the Central Post Office, the Langevin Block and the East Block	View of Confederation Square from the northeast
Connaught Building	1916 (completed)	1990	Ottawa; 45.426562°N 75.694669°W	A testament to Wilfrid Laurier's commitment to enhance the architecture in Canada's capital; one of the best works of David Ewart, the Chief Dominion Architect from 1896 to 1914	Northwest corner of the Connaught Building
Diefenbunker / Central Emergency Government Headquarters	1959 (completed)	1994	Ottawa; 45°21′06″N 76°02′50″W	An underground 4-storey bunker, capable of withstanding a near-hit from a nuclear explosion, built to shelter key Canadian political and military personnel in the event of a nuclear war, now a museum	View of the Diefenbunker gate and entrance in Carp, Ottawa, Ontario, Canada
Earnscliffe	1857 (completed)	1960	Ottawa; 45.437378°N 75.698912°W	A house overlooking the Ottawa River, once the home to Canada's first Prime Minister, Sir John A. Macdonald, now the official residence of the British High Commissioner to Canada	View of Earnscliffe
Former Archives Building	1906 (completed)	1990	Ottawa; 45°25′50″N 75°41′55.89″W	The home of the Public Archives of Canada from 1906 to 1967, and the Canadian War Museum from 1967 to 2005, this building was constructed as part of Prime Minister Sir Wilfrid Laurier's efforts to transform Ottawa from a lumber town into a capital city with requisite cultural and civic amenities and architecture	Exterior view of the Former Archives Building in 2010
Former Geological Survey of Canada Building	1863 (completion of the oldest part of the building)	1955	Ottawa; 45°25′35.45″N 75°41′38.16″W	Among the oldest government buildings in the capital, the building was the first Ottawa home of the Geological Survey of Canada; the building was also used to host the inaugural exhibit of the Canadian Academy of Arts in 1880 (the genesis of the collection of the National Gallery of Canada), and to display the Geological Survey's museum collections (which served as the foundation of the Canadian Museum of Nature)	Exterior view of the Former Geological Survey of Canada Building
Former Ottawa Teachers' College	1875 (completed)	1974	Ottawa; 45°25′11.97″N 75°41′27.35″W	A nationally significant example of the Gothic Revival style in an eclectic design; the building served as a normal school until 1974, and now serves as a wing of Ottawa City Hall	Exterior view of the Elgin Street frontage of the Former Ottawa Teachers' College
Hart Massey House	1959 (completed)	2018	Ottawa; 45.451356°N 75.671683°W	Built in 1959, Hart Massey House is an iconic example of mid-20th century modernism in residential architecture, and an example of International style because of its sensitivity to its natural surroundings.	
John R. Booth Residence	1909 (completed)	1990	Ottawa; 45.416762°N 75.692480°W	Built for lumber baron John R. Booth, the house is a nationally significant example of the Queen Anne Revival style in domestic architecture	Exterior view of the front facade of Booth House
Office of the Prime Minister and Privy Council	1889 (completed)	1977	Ottawa; 45°25′25.23″N 75°41′49.42″W	One of the finest examples of Second Empire style office building architecture in Canada, the office, formerly known as Langevin Block, was the first purpose-built office building erected by the federal government outside the boundaries of Parliament Hill; currently serves as home to the Prime Minister's Office and the Privy Council Office	Exterior view of the Wellington Street facade of the Langevin Block, as viewed from Parliament Hill
Laurier House	1878 (completed)	1956	Ottawa; 45.4277°N 75.6781°W	As Canada did not have official residences for elected officials until 1950, this house was the home of Sir Wilfrid Laurier and then William Lyon Mackenzie King during the periods when each was leader of the Liberal Party of Canada; Laurier and King each served both as Prime Ministers and Leaders of the Opposition while living in this home	Exterior view of Laurier House
Maplelawn & Gardens	1834 (completed)	1989	Ottawa; 45°23′17.63″N 75°45′43.02″W	A rare example of an early 19th-century country estate in Canada and an excellent example of the British classical style; the gardens are the best preserved of the few surviving examples of 19th-century walled gardens in Canada	View of the gardens of Maplelawn, with the house visible in the distance
National Arts Centre	1969 (completed)	2006	Ottawa; 45.4230°N 75.6938°W	Built to commemorate the Canadian Centennial and designed in the shape of hexagons, the centre heralded Canada's cultural and architectural achievements in the second half of the 20th century; also a component of the Confederation Square National Historic Site of Canada	Exterior view of the National Arts Centre from Elgin Street
Notre-Dame Roman Catholic Basilica	1842-1897 (construction)	1990	Ottawa; 45.42971°N 75.69646°W	A Basilica prominently located on Sussex Drive, whose twin towers mark the entrance to Lower Town, one of Ottawa's earliest neighbourhoods; it is considered an exceptional example of Gothic Revival architecture in Canada	Exterior view of Notre-Dame Cathedral Basilica from Sussex Drive
Parliament Buildings	1865 (West Block completed), 1866 (East Block), 1876 (Library of Parliament), 1920 (Centre Block)	1976	Ottawa; 45.4248°N 75.6992°W	The seat of the Parliament of Canada in a striking location on a hill above the Ottawa River; an important symbol serving as the physical embodiment of the Canadian government and federation	Exterior view of the Peace Tower clock
Public Grounds of the Parliament Buildings	1875 (initial completion)	1976	Ottawa; 45.424807°N 75.699234°W	The focal point for national celebrations in Ottawa; the grounds were originally designed by Calvert Vaux, and since supplemented by 18 monuments and memorials	Exterior view of grounds in front of the Centre Block, with the East Block and Langevin Block in the image
Rideau Canal *	1837 (completed)	1925	Ottawa to Kingston; 45°25′33″N 75°41′50″W	Built for the British government by Lieutenant-Colonel John By as a defensive work in the event of war with the United States, the still-functioning canal is the best preserved example of a 19th-century slack water canal in North America, with most of its original structures intact; a World Heritage Site and a unique historic landmark in the central core of Ottawa	View of the Rideau Canal in downtown Ottawa
Rideau Hall and Landscaped Grounds	1838 (completion of original villa)	1977	Ottawa; 45°26′39.73″N 75°41′9.5″W	The official Ottawa residence of the Governor General of Canada and the Canadian monarch; excellent example of the transposition of the natural style of the English country estate to Canada	Rideau Hall front facade
Royal Canadian Mint	1908 (completion of main building)	1979	Ottawa; 45°25′52.14″N 75°41′57.36″W	Representative of the federal government's approach to using the Tudor Gothic architectural style to create a distinctive identity in Canada's capital; the construction of this building, combining a mint and a refinery for gold produced by Canadian mines, symbolized the patriation of control over Canada's currency from Britain	View of the Royal Canadian Mint from Sussex Drive
Victoria Memorial Museum	1911 (completed)	1990	Ottawa; 45.41266°N 75.68875°W	Built to house Canada's first national museum, the building originally served as the home of the National Gallery of Canada and of the geological and natural history collections of the Geological Survey of Canada, and then served as the temporary premises of the Parliament of Canada from 1916 to 1922 when the original Centre Block was destroyed by fire; now the home of the Canadian Museum of Nature	View of the front facade of the Canadian Museum of Nature

== See also ==
- History of Ottawa
- List of designated heritage properties in Ottawa
