= Earnscliffe =

Canadian diplomatic residence

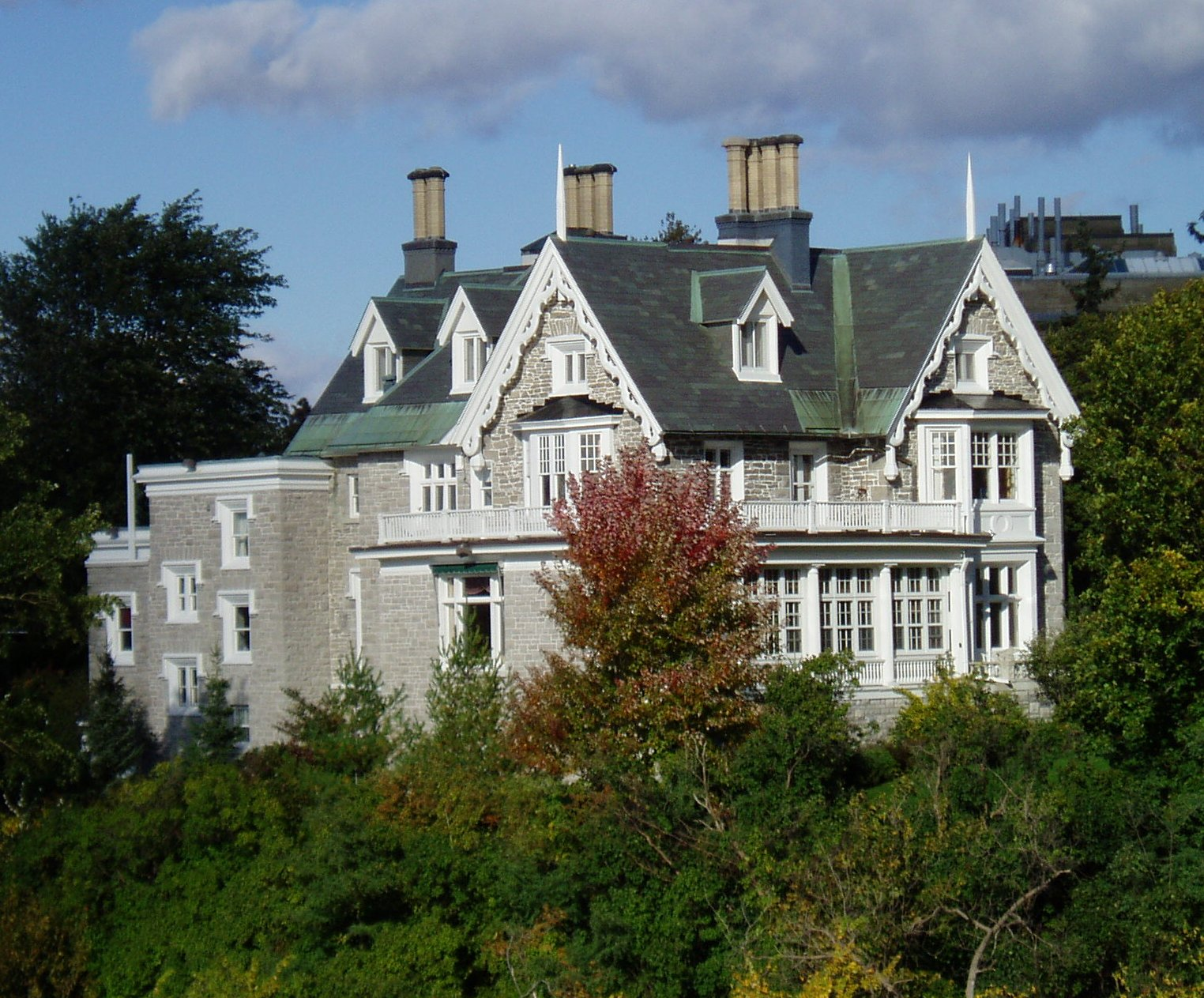
- Interactive map of Earnscliffe
- 45.437378°N 75.698912°W
- Location: 140 Sussex Drive; Ottawa, Ontario, Canada

History
- Built: 1855–57

Site notes
- Architectural style: Gothic Revival
- Current use: Residence of the British High Commissioner to Canada
- Owner: British government (since 1930)

National Historic Site of Canada
- Official name: Earnscliffe National Historic Site of Canada
- Designated: May 30, 1960

Earnscliffe is a Victorian manor in Ottawa, Ontario, built in the Gothic Revival style. During the late 19th century, it was home to Canada's first Prime Minister, Sir John A. Macdonald. Since 1930, it has served as the residence of the British high commissioner to Canada.

== Location and heritage status ==
The property overlooks the Ottawa River, just east of the Macdonald-Cartier Bridge. It is located to the northwest of Sussex Drive, across from the Lester B. Pearson Building. Earnscliffe sits on the grounds of the British High Commission office complex that opened in 2024.

The house is a National Historic Site and the location of a plaque erected by the Historic Sites and Monuments Board of Canada. However, since it is a diplomatic residence, it is closed to visitors except for special public events, such as Doors Open Ottawa. It was designated as "Earnscliffe National Historic Site of Canada" on May 30, 1960.

== History ==
The manor was built by Thomas McKay's company for his son-in-law, John McKinnon, from 1855 to 1857. McKinnon died suddenly in 1866 and the house was purchased by another of McKay's sons-in-law, Thomas Keefer. Two years later, he sold it to Thomas Reynolds, a railroad developer. Reynolds resided there for several years, and it was during this period that the house got the name Earnscliffe, an archaic term for "eagle's cliff".

Reynolds died in 1879, and his son sold the house to Sir John A. Macdonald in 1883. Macdonald had earlier stayed with Reynolds, and there are some stories that he gave it its name. When Sir John A. Macdonald visited, they discussed about its name as Eaglescliffe, but he suggested the Old English word for eagle, earn, and his suggestion was accepted. In 1888, Macdonald made several additions to the structure. In 1891, after having a stroke, Macdonald died in his room at Earnscliffe.

His widow, Lady Macdonald, briefly continued to reside in the home after his death, and Queen Victoria made her Baroness Macdonald of Earnscliffe. Soon, however, Lady Macdonald and her daughter departed for England and leased the house to Lord Treowen, commander of the militia. Over the next decades, the building was home to several local notables, including Mrs. Charles A.E. Harriss.

In 1930, William Henry Clark, the first British high commissioner to Canada, arranged to buy the house for the British government. It has been the home of the British high commissioner ever since.

In 2005, a plaque and tree was installed on the grounds of Earnscliffe, in commemoration of the CANLOAN program and its participants.

On October 4, 2011, a fire damaged the building. British High Commissioner Andrew Pocock, living in the house at the time, was fine and no one was injured in the fire.

Due to deterioration, the house had been vacant since about 2024 with the high commissioner living elsewhere. A major problem was that the heating system was deficient in cold weather. By mid 2026, a contract to renovate the building was being prepared, with renovation expected to be completed by approximately 2029. To be largely preserved are some MacDonald-era features such as MacDonald's office, the upstairs bedroom where he died and a bench at the top of the stairs where MacDonald's handicapped daughter Mary could watch proceedings below. Official events would be conducted on the ground floor with living quarters on the upper floors. The renovation will overhaul the basement kitchen and make the building accessible.

== See also ==
- British High Commission, Ottawa
- List of designated heritage properties in Ottawa
- 24 Sussex Drive, the Canadian prime minister's official residence
