= Delegation of the Ismaili Imamat, Ottawa =

Office of the Ismaili Imamat in Canada

Coordinates: 45.435067°N 75.697727°W

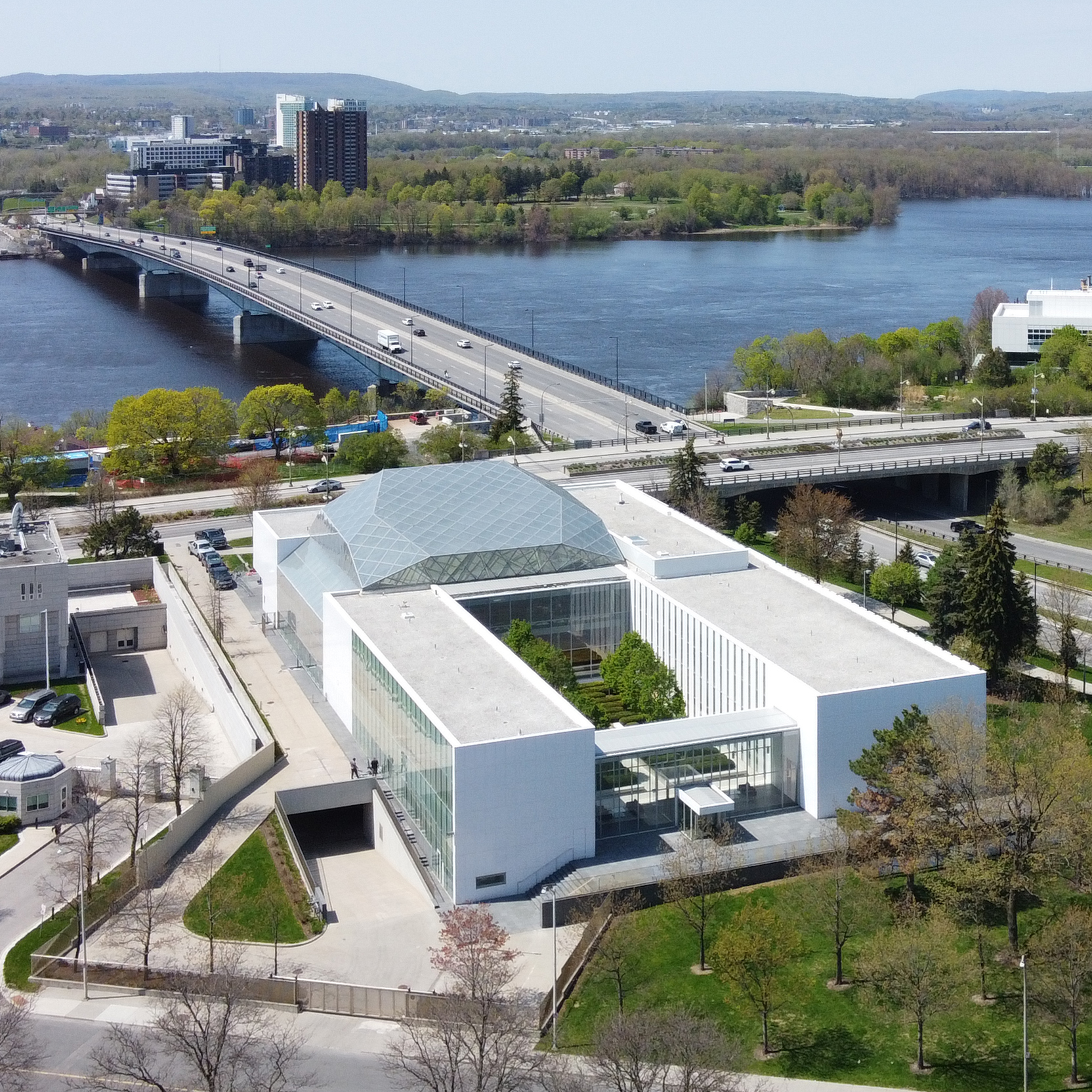
The Ismaili Delegation in Ottawa, ON

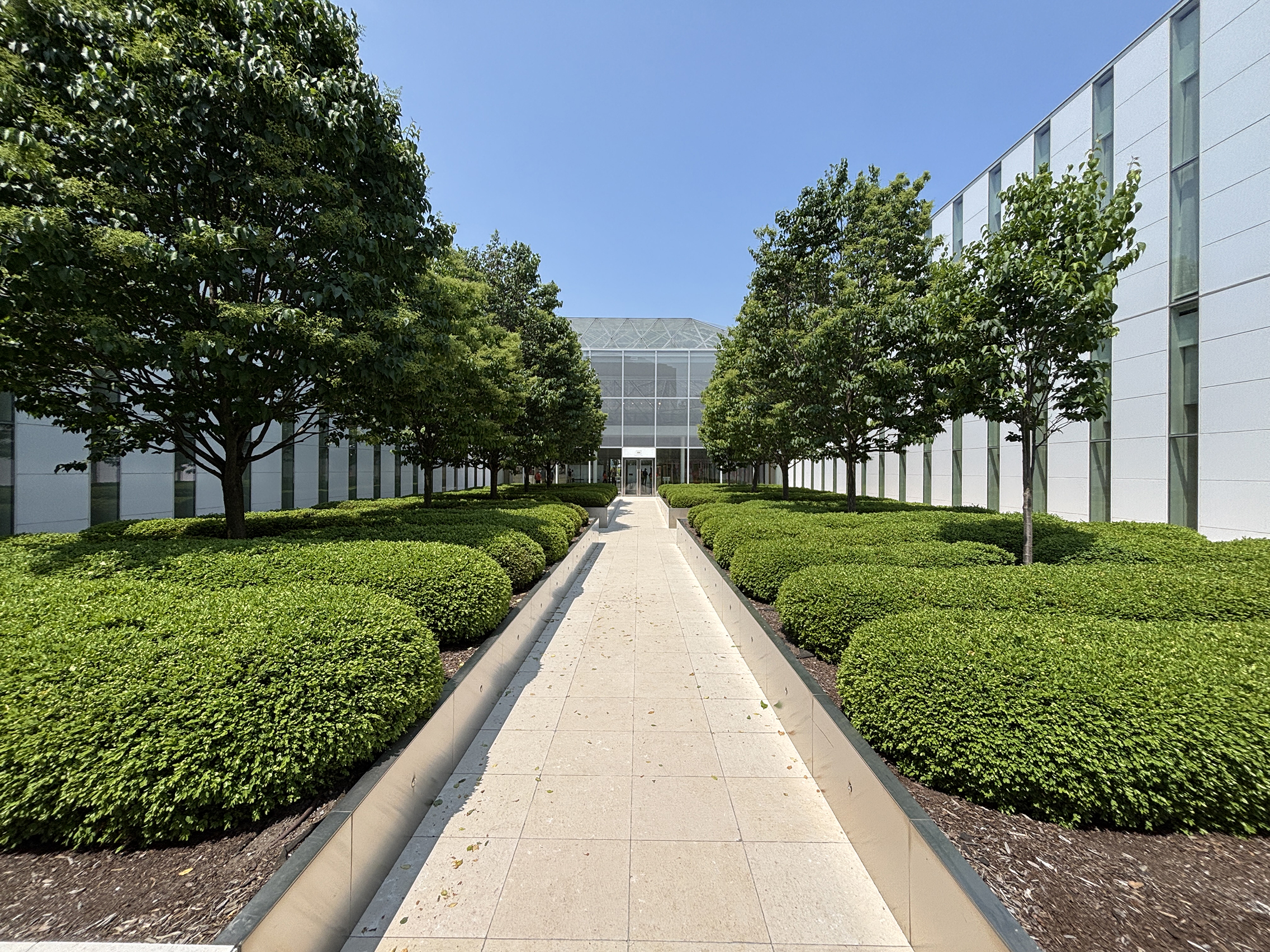
Exterior courtyard

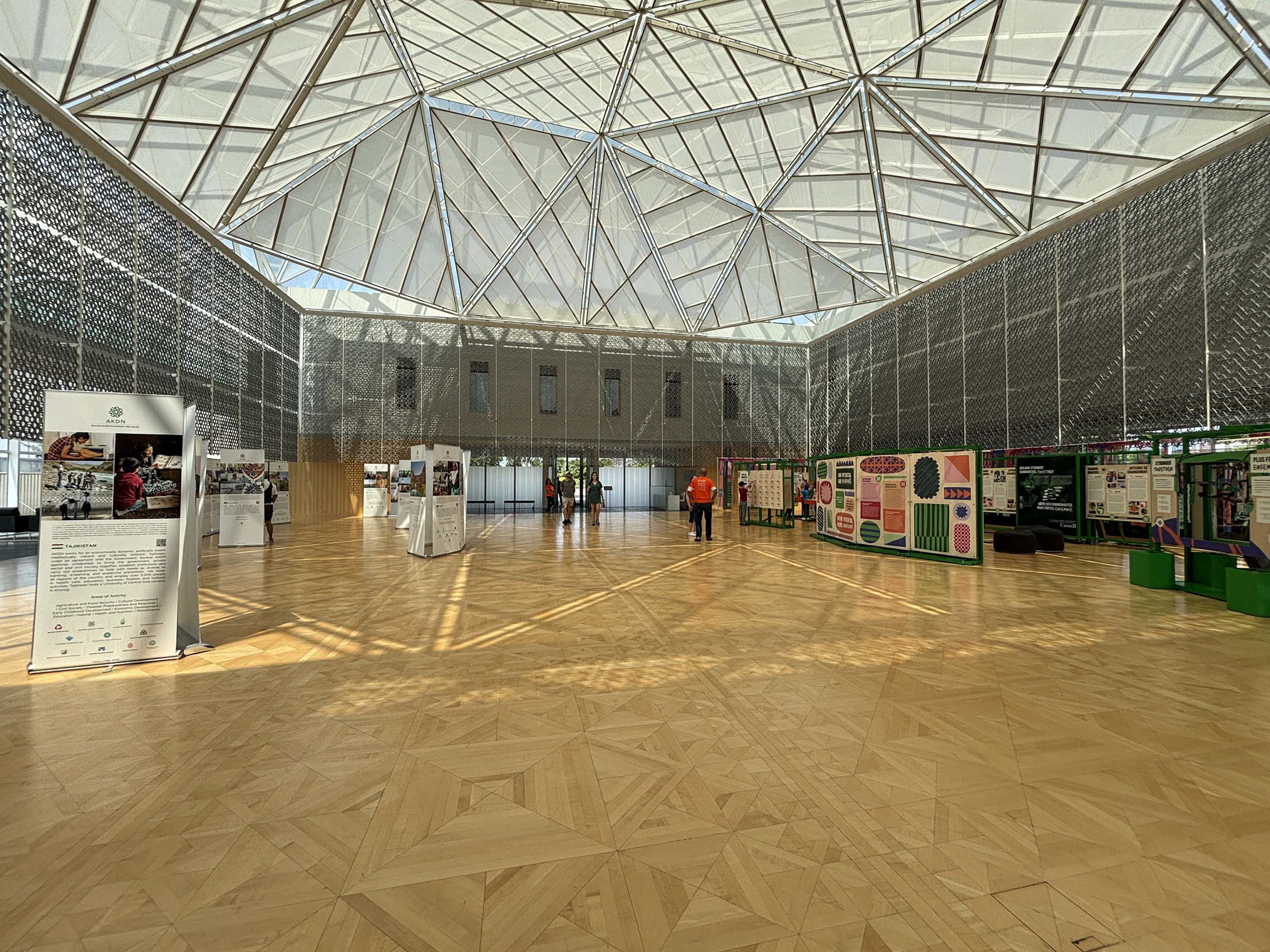
Interior atrium

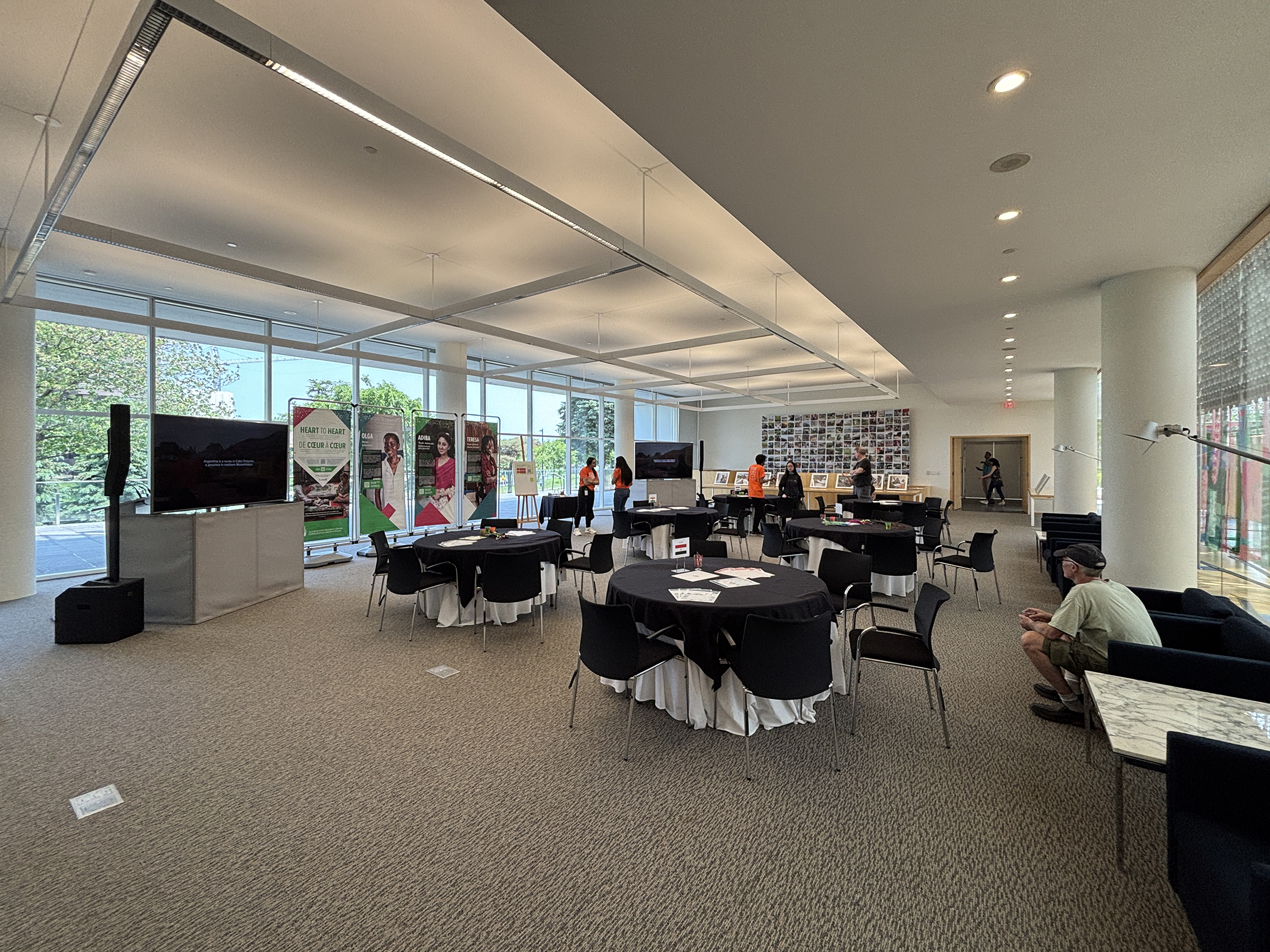
Activity Room

The Delegation of the Ismaili Imamat in Ottawa, Ontario, Canada, is the representational office of the Ismaili Imamat in Canada and includes the headquarters of the Aga Khan Foundation Canada. It is located between the Embassy of Saudi Arabia and the Lester B. Pearson Building on Sussex Drive. It was opened in 2008.

The building, as named, serves as a de facto embassy in Canada for the Ismaili Imamat, the institutional office of the Imams (spiritual leaders) of the Nizari Shia Muslims. Representatives of the Ismaili Imamat can receive dignitaries of the Canadian government, and diplomatic community.

== Building and opening ==
The building was initiated by the Aga Khan IV, the 49th Imam of the Nizaris in the presence of Adrienne Clarkson, Governor General of Canada, on June 6, 2005. It was designed by the internationally celebrated Japanese architect Fumihiko Maki, together with the Canadian firm Moriyama & Teshima.

The Delegation of the Ismaili Imamat was formally opened by Prime Minister Stephen Harper on Saturday, December 6, 2008 during an official visit of the Aga Khan IV to Ottawa. In addition to the Prime Minister, the opening was also attended by several federal ministers including Transport Minister John Baird, Foreign Minister Lawrence Cannon and Minister of State for Status of Women Helena Guergis. Also in attendance were former Governor General Adrienne Clarkson, writer John Ralston Saul, David Mulroney, chief of the PCO Afghan task force, his CIDA counterpart Stephen Wallace, former deputy minister of foreign affairs Peter Harder, the Governor of the Bank of Canada, Chief Justice of Canada Beverley McLachlin, former ambassador to Washington Derek Burney, former Liberal foreign minister Bill Graham, former ambassador to the UN Allan Rock, Herb Gray, the longest serving MP in Canadian history and various ambassadors of other countries to Canada.

The $54-million building is the first in the world to represent the Ismaili Imamat, as represented by the Aga Khan, spiritual leader of the world’s 15 million Nizari Ismailis. Based in Europe, he heads the Aga Khan Development Network, one of the largest private development networks in the world. The building houses 60 employees of the Aga Khan Foundation Canada, a non-profit development agency, and the Aga Khan Development Network Diplomatic Office. Prior to its opening in 2017, the Global Centre for Pluralism - an education and research centre - was based out of the Delegation of the Ismaili Imamat.

The Delegation provides public tours at designated times throughout the year.

The building includes a library and offices, as well as a residence and office for the Aga Khan’s use during visits.

== Architecture ==
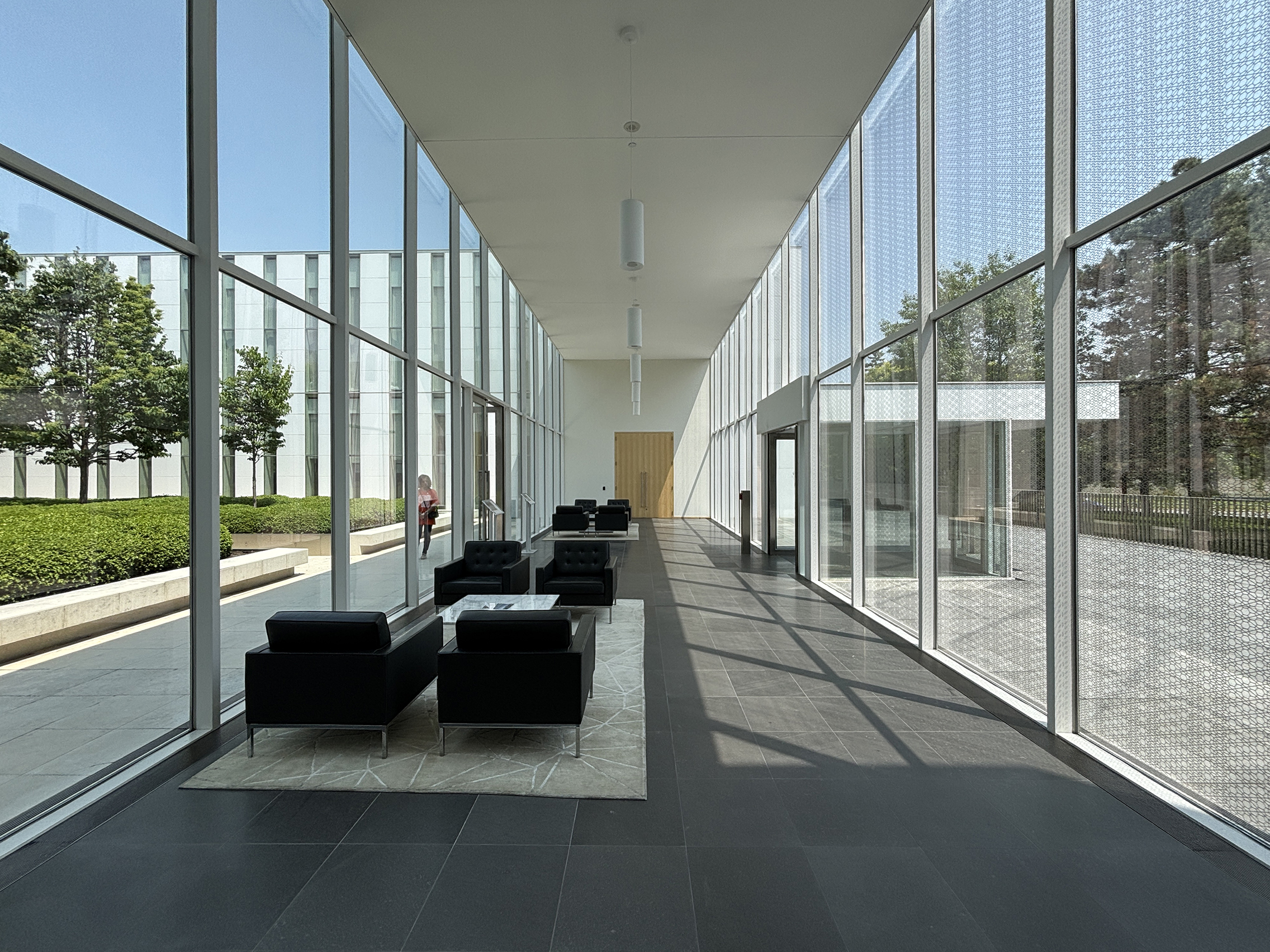
Inside

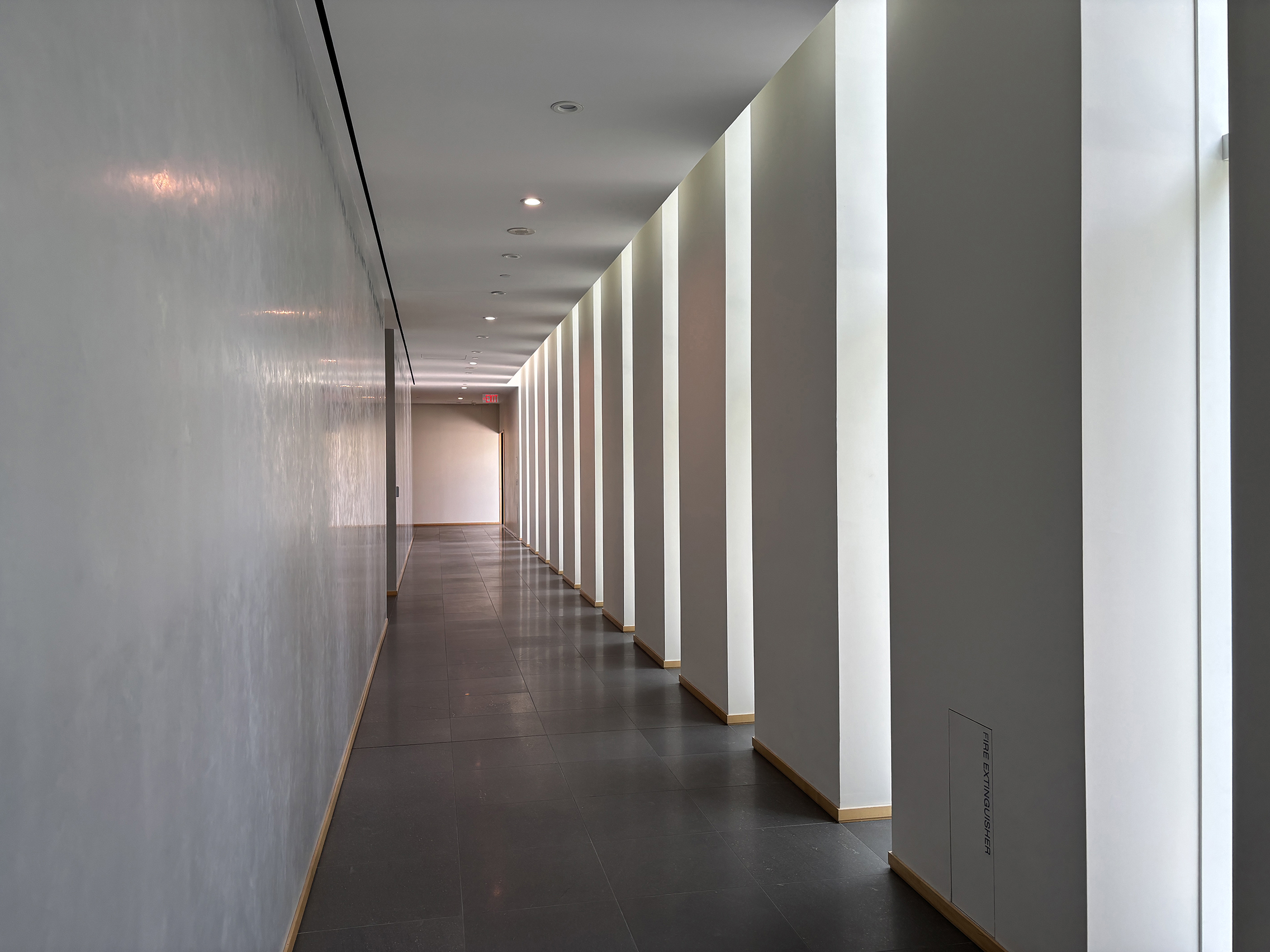
Corridor windows

Designed by Moriyama & Teshima Architects in collaboration with the Pritzker Prize–winning architect Fumihiko Maki, the Ottawa Delegation is the first building in the world that will represent the Ismaili Imamat and its institutions. It is configured as an elongated, rectangular ring, surrounding an interior atrium and an exterior courtyard that features a traditional Chahr-bagh Islamic garden. The building rests on a solid linear granite podium, and is covered by a glass dome through which light illuminates the atrium and courtyard. The building as a whole is inspired by natural rock-crystal and is an interplay of visual clarity, opacity and translucency. It houses meeting rooms, exhibition areas, a lecture theatre, resource center, and private apartments.

The Aga Khan IV proposed that Maki take inspiration from rock crystal, which is at once translucent, transparent and opaque. The two-storey structure rests on a podium of black granite. It is clad in white Neoparies, a crystallized glass material with a marble-like texture that reflects light. Side walls are arranged in alternating bands of transparent and translucent glass. The simple rectilinear building contains an atrium topped by an asymmetrical glass dome. Surrounding the atrium is a patterned screen of cast aluminum, evoking screens of historic Islamic architecture.

== Awards ==
The Delegation of the Ismaili Imamat in Ottawa was named a recipient of the 2012 Governor General’s Medals in Architecture. The award recognises outstanding design in projects by Canadian architects, and is administered by the Royal Architectural Institute of Canada and the Canada Council for the Arts Act. The award recognizes outstanding design in recent projects by Canadian architects.

The Delegation of the Ismaili Imamat in Ottawa was the winner of the 2010 People's Choice Award Winner by the Ontario Association of Architects.

In 2010, the Delegation won the Design Excellence Award by the Ontario Association of Architects.
