= Sussex Drive =

Ceremonial road in Ottawa

- Promenade Sussex
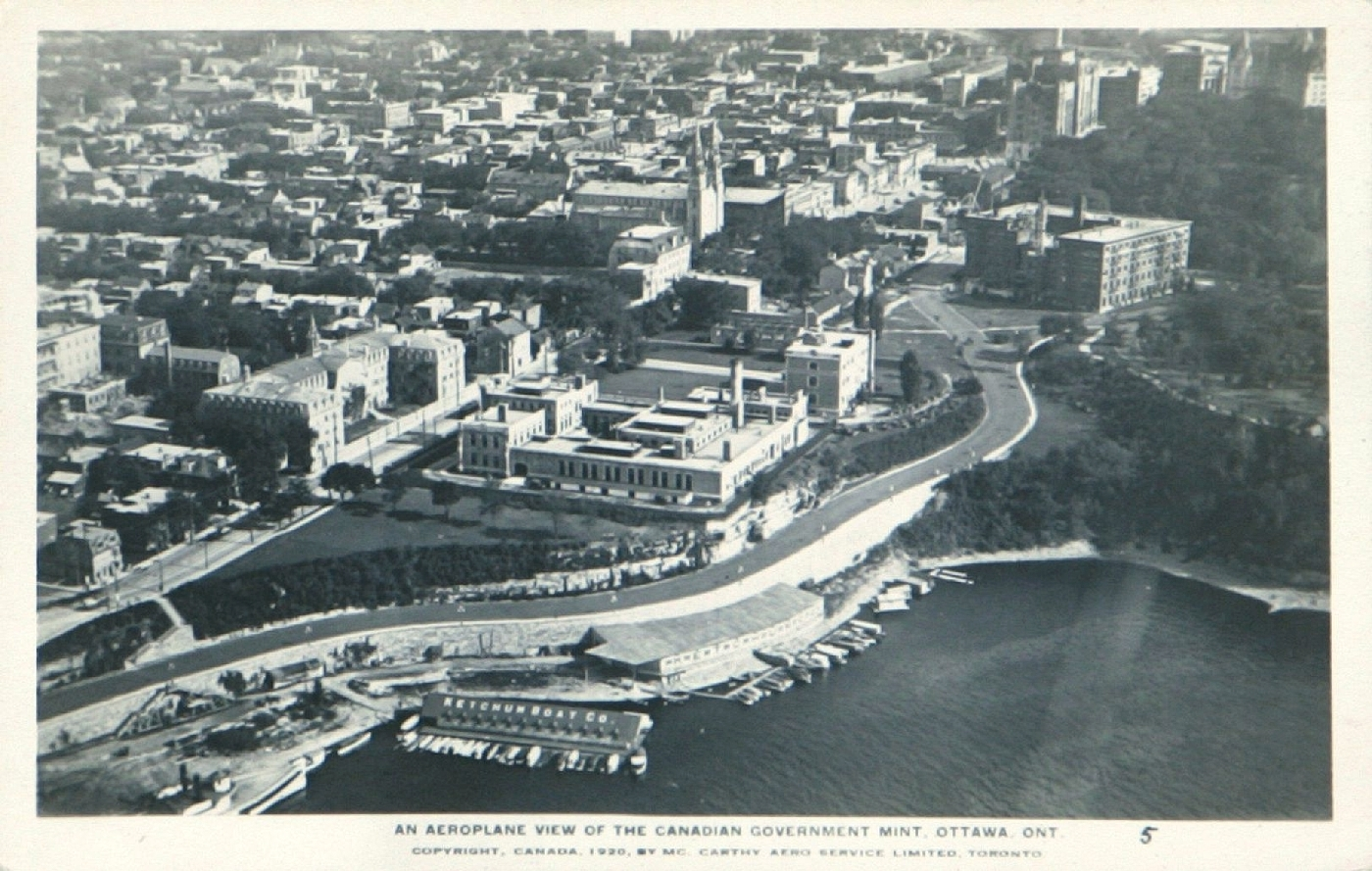
- Aerial view of Sussex Street and the Royal Canadian Mint, circa 1920
- Type: Street
- Maintained by: City of Ottawa
- Length: 2.4 km (1.5 mi)
- Location: Ottawa
- North end: Rideau Gate (continues as Sir George-Étienne Cartier Parkway)
- Major junctions: Road 99 (King Edward Avenue) to Quebec Autoroute 5 via Macdonald-Cartier Bridge
- South end: Rideau Street

Sussex Drive (French: Promenade Sussex), also known as Ottawa Regional Road 93, is an arterial road in Ottawa, Ontario, the capital of Canada. It is one of the city's main ceremonial and institutional routes. Travelling roughly parallel to the Ottawa River, Sussex Drive begins as a continuation of Sir George-Étienne Cartier Parkway at Rideau Gate, at the entrance to Rideau Hall. It travels south to Rideau Street, with the portion south of St. Patrick Street forming the northbound half of a one-way pair with Mackenzie Avenue. Both Mackenzie Avenue and Sussex Drive connect with Colonel By Drive at their southern end, which continues south alongside the Rideau Canal.

Sussex Drive was laid out as three separately named streets during the establishment of Ottawa in the first half of the 19th century: Sussex Street, between Bolton Street and Rideau Street; Metcalfe Street (likely named for Governor General Charles Metcalfe, 1st Baron Metcalfe), between Bolton Street and the Rideau River; and Ottawa Street between the river and Rockcliffe Park. The latter two were renamed as an extension of Sussex Street following Ottawa's annexation of New Edinburgh in 1886. Numerous government institutions were established along Sussex in the early 20th century, and embassies were established following World War II. As a result of the Greber Plan, the road was widened and rebuilt and the buildings along it refurbished throughout the 1950s and 1960s. It was renamed Sussex Drive in November 1953 during a visit by the Queen Mother.

== Route description ==
Known as Canada's ceremonial road, Sussex Drive is a boulevard through the ByWard Market, Lower Town and New Edinburgh neighbourhoods of Ottawa. A number of landmarks, embassies and institutions line the road, many of which are designated National Historical Sites. In addition, a number of parks and monuments are located throughout the length of the route, several of which overlook the Ottawa River. The entire route forms a portion of Confederation Boulevard, a ceremonial route around Ottawa and Gatineau used by foreign dignitaries and during royal visits to Canada. The City of Ottawa, which has jurisdiction over the entire route, classifies Sussex Drive as an urban arterial road throughout its length.

Sussex Drive begins at a traffic circle adjacent to Rockcliffe Park, through which the roadway continues as Sir George-Étienne Cartier Parkway. Adjacent to the traffic circle are Rideau Hall at 1 Sussex Drive, home to the Governor General, the Prime Minister's residence at 24 Sussex Drive directly opposite Rideau Hall, and the High Commission of South Africa. Sussex Drive proceeds south-southwest, parallel to the southern shoreline of the Ottawa River, as a two-lane road with a central raised median or turn lane. The Embassy of France and the Centre for Geography and Exploration bookend the portion of the route through New Edinburgh.

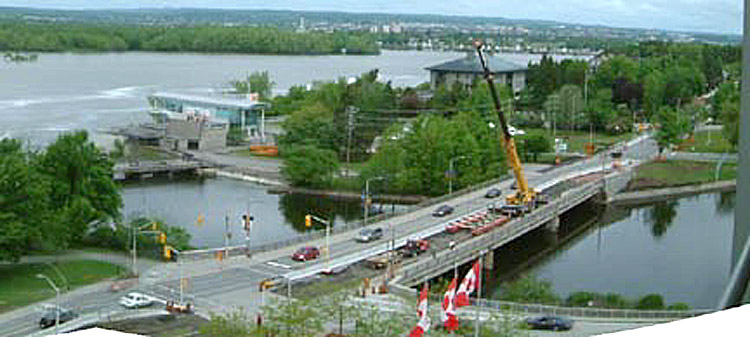
Sussex Drive crossing the Rideau River

Widening to four lanes as it crosses the first of the ByTown Bridges over the Rideau River, Sussex Drive passes above Rideau Falls onto Green Island. There the John G. Diefenbaker Building, former Ottawa City Hall, is complemented by the Ottawa Memorial, Mackenzie–Papineau Monument, the National Artillery Monument, and a statue of John McCrae. Crossing the second bridge, the road returns to the mainland in the Lower Town neighbourhood and intersects the northern end of King Edward Avenue, which provides access to Quebec Autoroute 5 in Gatineau via the Macdonald-Cartier Bridge. Surrounding this intersection are the National Research of Canada (NRC) Laboratories as well as the Lester B. Pearson Building, which is home to Global Affairs Canada. The former residence of John A. Macdonald, Earnscliffe, is preserved at 140 Sussex Drive, adjacent to the NRC Labs.

Crossing over the southern end of the Macdonald-Cartier Bridge, Sussex Drive passes the Delegation of the Ismaili Imamat and the Embassy of Saudi Arabia. It gradually curves south-southeast around the Embassy of Japan before straightening out and travelling between the Royal Canadian Mint and Élisabeth Bruyère Hospital, the first hospital in Ottawa, situated at 43 Bruyère Street. The Global Centre for Pluralism, which opened in the former Canadian War Museum in 2017, and the Embassy of Kuwait immediately follow the previous two buildings on either side of the road. Approaching the ByWard Market, the route passes the Canada School of Public Service at La Salle Academy and the Notre-Dame Cathedral Basilica to the east and the National Gallery of Canada to the west, which features a Maman sculpture in front of the entrance.

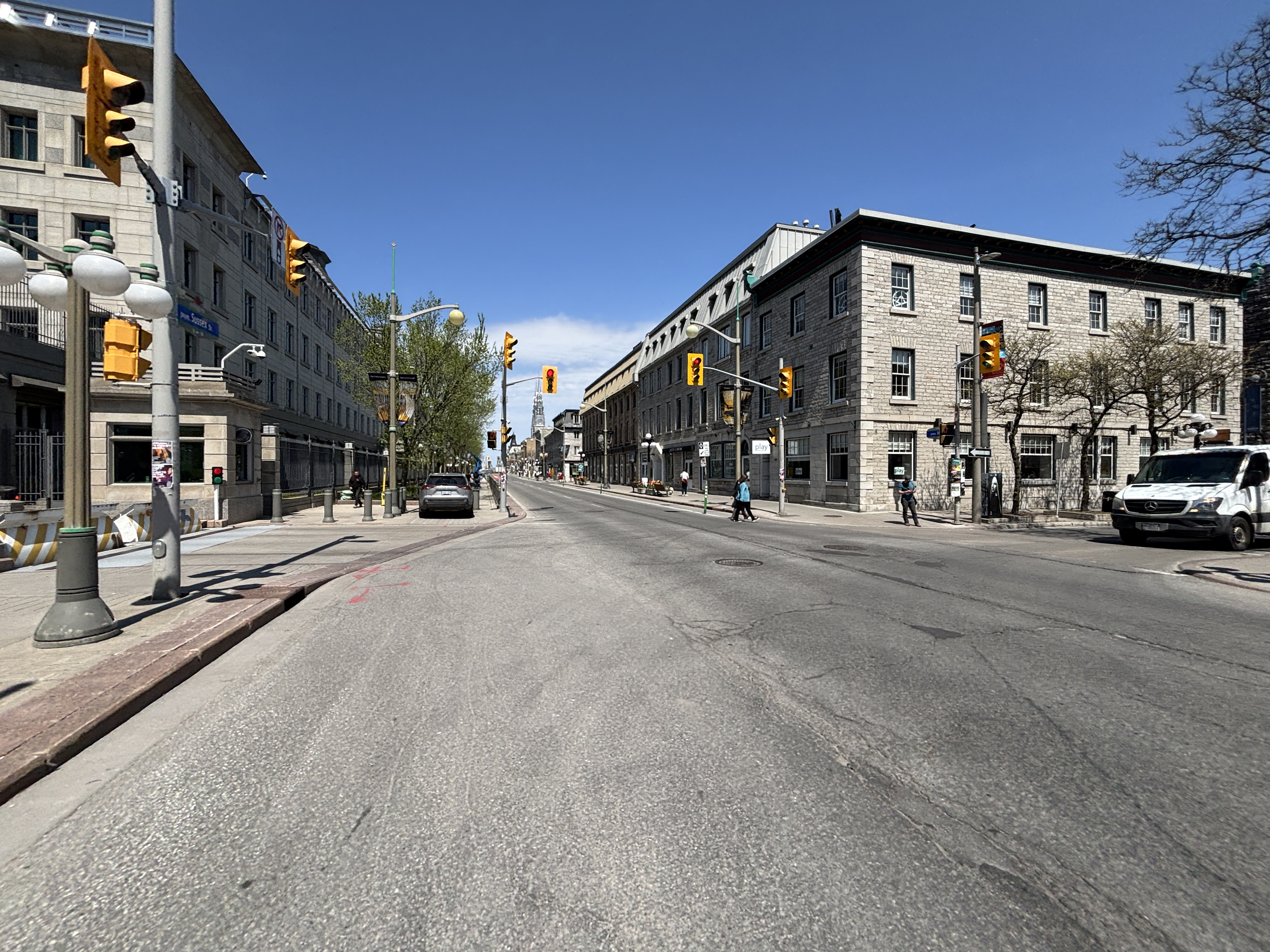
Looking north on Sussex Drive from the York Steps

At the Alexandra Bridge approach, Sussex Drive becomes a northbound one-way arterial road paired with Mackenzie Avenue, which serves southbound traffic. St. Patrick Street and Murray Street, also a one-way pair, provide access to and from the bridge. The four roads combined encircle the Peacekeeping Monument, while Major's Hill Park lies to the southwest of this junction. Entering the ByTown Market along its western edge, Sussex Drive features wall-to-wall storefronts with apartments above them on the east side and the Embassy of the United States on the west side. The Former Geological Survey of Canada Building and Connaught Building sandwich the road at George Street. Sussex Street ends at Rideau Street, where it and Mackenzie Avenue connect with Colonel By Drive south along the eastern bank of the Rideau Canal. The Rideau Centre stands on the southeast corner of the intersection, while the former Union Station which was repurposed into the Senate of Canada Building is on the southwest corner. The Daly Building once stood between Sussex and Mackenzie on the north side of Rideau Street, but was demolished in the early 1990s and replaced by a residential condominium in 2005.

=== Points of interest ===
Table of addresses and sites along Sussex Drive
Address	Point(s) of interest	Year built	Notes	Image
1 Sussex Drive	Rideau Hall	1865	Official residence of the Governor General of Canada since 1865	
15 Sussex Drive	High Commission of South Africa	1842	Occupied by High Commission of South Africa since 1944	
24 Sussex Drive	Official Residence of the Prime Minister	1868	Expropriated by the Canadian government in 1949	
42 Sussex Drive	Embassy of France	1939		
50 Sussex Drive	Centre for Geography and Exploration	2000		
–	Rideau Falls	–	Twin curtain waterfalls at the confluence of the Rideau River and Ottawa River	
–	Ottawa Memorial; Mackenzie–Papineau Monument; National Artillery Monument statue of John McCrae	Various	Sites are located throughout Green Island	
100 Sussex Drive	National Research of Canada Laboratories	1932		
111 Sussex Drive	John G. Diefenbaker Building	1958	Government of Canada offices	
125 Sussex Drive	Lester B. Pearson Building	1973	Home to Global Affairs Canada	
140 Sussex Drive	Earnscliffe	1857	Official residence of John A. Macdonald in Ottawa	
199 Sussex Drive	Delegation of the Ismaili Imamat	2008	Aga Khan Foundation	
201 Sussex Drive	Embassy of Saudi Arabia	2005		
255 Sussex Drive	Embassy of Japan	1978		
320 Sussex Drive	Royal Canadian Mint	1908		
43 Bruyère Street	Élisabeth Bruyère Hospital	1845	Original building of Ottawa General Hospital 1845–1980	
330 Sussex Drive	Global Centre for Pluralism	1906	Dominion Archives 1906–1967; Canadian War Museum 1967–2005; Global Centre for Pluralism 2017–present	
333 Sussex Drive	Embassy of Kuwait	2003		
373 Sussex Drive	Canada School of Public Service at La Salle Academy	1845	Bishop's Palace (1845); Bytown College (1853)	
380 Sussex Drive	National Gallery of Canada	1988		
385 Sussex Drive	Notre-Dame Cathedral Basilica	1846		
–	Peacekeeping Monument	1992	Centred between Sussex Drive, Mackenzie Avenue, St. Patrick Street and Murray Street	
–	Major's Hill Park	1832		
419 Sussex Drive	Richard Robinson Fashion Design Academy	1969		
431 Sussex Drive	Earl of Sussex Pub	1978		
475 Sussex Drive	Revere Hotel	1846	Jeanne D'Arc Institute	
490 Sussex Drive	Embassy of the United States	1999		
543 Sussex Drive	Former Geological Survey of Canada Building	1863		
550 Sussex Drive	Connaught Building	1915		
700 Sussex Drive	Former Daly Building	1905–1992	Condominiums since 2005	

== History ==
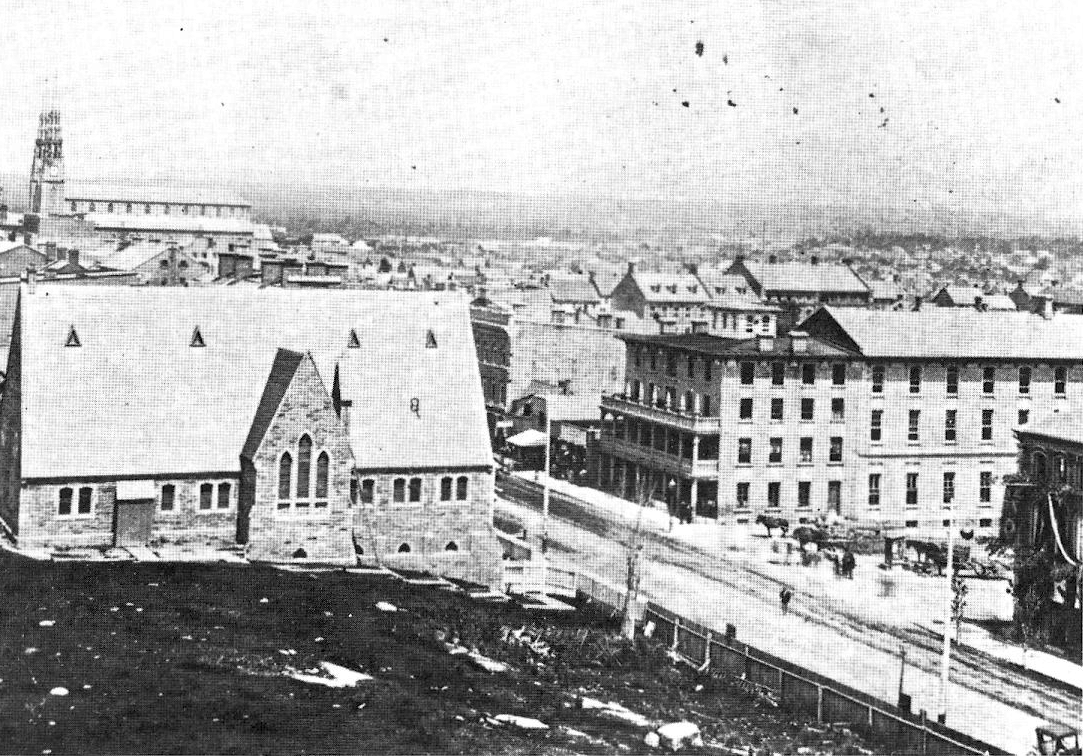
Sussex Street c. 1865, taken from south of George Street. The Notre-Dame Cathedral Basilica spires are under construction in the background.

Sussex Drive is named after Prince Augustus Frederick, Duke of Sussex (1773–1843), son of King George III, and an early abolitionist. It was known as Sussex Street until 1953, when it was renamed during a visit by the Queen Mother. Originally it was the primary road in Ottawa, serving to connect the former Union Station (now the Senate of Canada Building) with the Queen's Wharf at the foot of the Rideau Canal. The street continued as Metcalfe Street to New Edinburgh, becoming Ottawa Street at the Nepean–Gloucester boundary along the Rideau River and ending at Rockcliffe Park. Sussex Street was built on land acquired by Colonel John By (1779–1836), whom laid out Upper and Lower Bytown, and by Thomas McKay (1792–1855), whom built the locks where the Rideau Canal meets the Ottawa River. McKay gradually purchased over 1,000 acres (400 ha) of land and established New Edinburgh in 1832. New Edinburgh was incorporated as a village on August 15, 1866, and annexed by the City of Ottawa in 1886. As a result of this, Metcalfe Street and Ottawa Street were renamed as part of Sussex Street.

On the eve of Confederation, Rideau Hall, which was built by McKay, was leased to the government of Canada West in 1865 before being bought outright in 1867. This, along with John A. Macdonald's home Earnscliffe, would establish Sussex Street as the heart of the new capital of Canada. (Note: Ottawa was designated as the capital of the Province of Canada by Queen Victoria ten years prior in 1857.) By this time, several of the non-governmental institutions were established along the street, including Ottawa General Hospital (now Élisabeth Bruyère Hospital), Bytown College (now La Salle Academy), Notre-Dame Cathedral, the Former Geological Survey of Canada Building, the Revere Hotel, and what is now 24 Sussex Drive. These buildings, as well as houses, shops and hotels, were built following the passage of the Vesting Act in 1843, which subdivided the land in Lower Town, as well as the arrival of the railway in 1854. The ByWard Market was subsequently established over the next half century. During the early 1900s, several notable government institutions were built along Sussex Street, including the Dominion Archives in 1906 (later the Canadian War Museum, now the Global Centre for Pluralism), the Royal Canadian Mint in 1908, and the Connaught Building in 1915. The Daly Building, which opened as a department store in 1905, was purchased by the government in 1921; it was demolished in 1991 after standing vacant for several years.

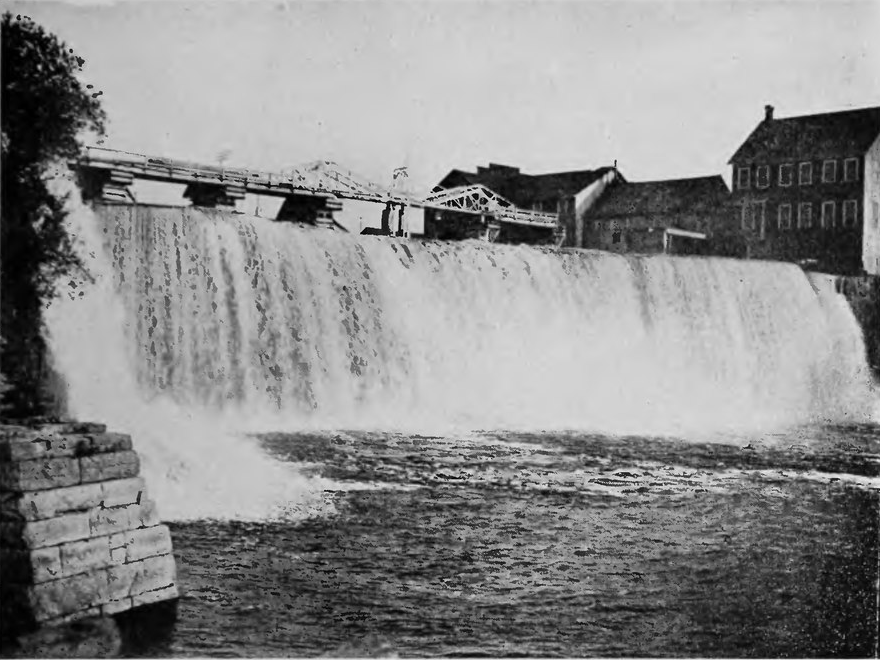
Rideau Falls c. 1911, with the old iron bridge carrying Sussex Street above

Throughout the mid-20th century, a large portion of Ottawa saw massive gentrification under the Greber Plan, which was produced by Jacques Gréber in 1949 under the direction of Prime Minister Mackenzie King. Although Gréber had been corresponding with King as early as 1936, World War II halted any plans from reaching fruition at that time. Following the war, Gréber was again contacted and his expertise requested. He arrived on October 2, 1945, and began working almost immediately. The Greber Plan, as it came to be known, was released in 1950 and presented to the House of Commons on May 22, 1951. The plan called for the complete reorganization of Ottawa's road and rail network, including numerous parkways and an east to west expressway (The Queensway) along what was then a Canadian National Railway line.

The Federal District Commission began implementation of the Greber Plan at the behest of Ottawa mayor Charlotte Whitton in 1953, including several projects along Sussex Street that would remove the street car tracks along it and widen it to four lanes with a central boulevard. The iron bridges over the Rideau River were rebuilt as concrete spans and overhead wires were mostly rerouted underground. These projects were completed in anticipation of a visit by the Queen Mother in late 1954, at which point Sussex Street was renamed Sussex Drive. She toured Ottawa in November of that year, officially dedicating the Bytown Bridges, Sussex Drive, and Colonel By Drive on November 16.

=== National Capital Commission ===
In 1959, following the passage of the National Capital Act the previous year, the National Capital Commission (NCC) was formed. The act replaced the FDC with the NCC and gave it broad ranging powers, including the ability to expropriate land. One of the first issues that came before the NCC was the increasing commercialisation of Sussex Drive. In particular, the demolition of the 100-year-old Goulden Hotel at the corner of Bruyere Street drew the ire of locals and set forth a movement to preserve the historic character of the road. Consequently, the NCC set forth in 1961 to purchase the remaining properties along Sussex Drive that were over 100 years old and establish a grand Mile of History. Architect Peter Stoakes was tasked with uncovering historical records for each property and conducting studies into their current condition. While a number of a buildings were determined to be unfit and demolished, the remainder saw fire exits moved from the street, and facades sand-blasted, painted, and embellished to recreate an 1867 appearance. However, the plan was never fully realised due to a number of a factors, including a shift in government with the election of Lester B. Pearson in 1963, as well as other more urgent priorities such as the Macdonald-Cartier Bridge approaches, Union Station, and Highway 417. Despite this, the NCC purchased every historic property on the road by 1963.

Following the removal of the railways into Union Station in 1966, planning for the Rideau Centre commenced, which would result in several changes to the street network in the ByWard Market. Colonel By Drive was extended from Hawthorne Avenue to Rideau Street in 1967, connecting with the southern end of Sussex Drive and Mackenzie Avenue. In 1973, plans were announced to rebuild the Sussex Drive, Mackenzie Avenue, St. Patrick Street and Murray Street intersections and make the roads into one-way pairs. Murray Street would be extended west of Sussex Drive and Mackenzie Avenue would be realigned to gradually merge into Sussex Drive at St. Andrew Street. However, these plans, as well as the Rideau Centre, would be stalled for nearly a decade due to public opposition to various proposals. Work eventually began on both in late 1981. Sussex Street and Mackenzie Avenue were reopened as paired one-way streets in July 1982. The intersections with Murray Street and St. Patrick Street were rebuilt again in 1983 in order to remove the wasted triangle of land between Mackenzie Avenue and Sussex Drive north of St. Patrick Street.

A number of nations purchased properties along Sussex Drive throughout the years in order to establish embassies. The Embassy of France and the High Commission of South Africa were both established prior to World War II, while Japan and Saudi Arabia both purchased land for their embassies in 1978, although the latter did not open until 2005. The American Embassy was opened by US president Bill Clinton on October 8, 1999. The Kuwait Embassy was opened in 2003.

== Major intersections ==
The following table lists the major junctions along Sussex Drive. The entire route is located in Ottawa.

km	mi	Destinations	Notes
0.00	0.00	Rideau Gate	Continues north as Sir George-Étienne Cartier Parkway
0.10	0.06	McKay Street	
0.80	0.50	Road 99 (King Edward Avenue)	A-5 – Gatineau via Macdonald-Cartier Bridge
1.90	1.18	Road 44 east (St. Patrick Street) to Gatineau, Quebec via Alexandra Bridge	Southbound traffic detours west to MacKenzie Avenue; two-way street begins
2.00	1.24	Road 44 west (Murray Street)	
2.40	1.49	Road 34 (Rideau Street)	Road 93 (Colonel By Drive) continues south
1.000 mi = 1.609 km; 1.000 km = 0.621 mi

== See also ==
- Confederation Boulevard
- Wellington Street (Ottawa)
- Royal eponyms in Canada
