= Thomas McKay =

Canadian politician

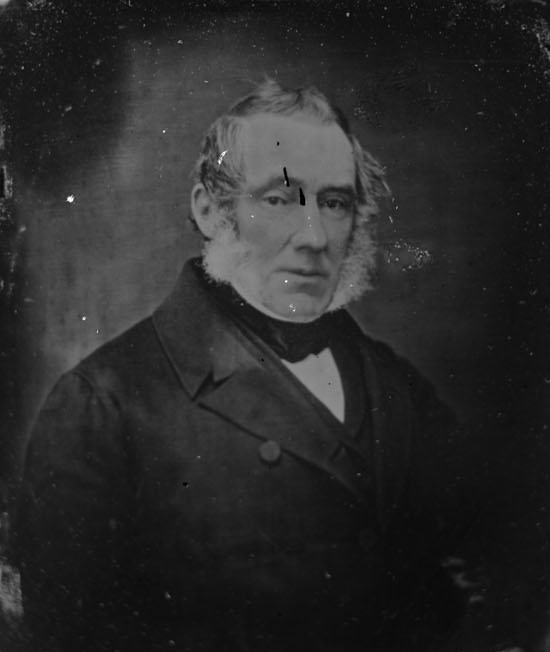
- Reproduction of a McKay portrait
- Born: 1 September 1792; Perth, Scotland
- Died: 9 October 1855 (aged 63)
- Occupation: Architect

Thomas McKay (Note: He spelt his surname "McKay" but places named in his honour frequently use "MacKay", or "Mackay" instead.) (1 September 1792 – 9 October 1855) was a Canadian businessman who was one of the founders of the city of Ottawa, Ontario.

== Biography ==
McKay was born in Perth, Scotland and became a skilled stonemason. He emigrated to the Canadas in 1817, and settled in Montreal.

He became partners with John Redpath and their firm did the masonry work on the Lachine Canal near Montreal, they then went on to build the locks on the lower section of the Rideau Canal, between the Rideau River and the Ottawa River at Bytown. McKay also built two stone spans for the Union Bridge, which was the first bridge across the Ottawa River between Hull, Quebec and Bytown. The Commissariat building built by McKay in 1827 during the construction of the Rideau Canal now serves as home to the Bytown Museum and is the oldest surviving stone building in the city of Ottawa.

McKay was one of the few business leaders to remain in Bytown after the canal project was finished. He bought land at the intersection of the Rideau River and Ottawa River and laid out a town, which he named New Edinburgh. McKay built a sawmill and a gristmill on land there. He encouraged Scottish immigrants to come to the area and it became a prosperous industrial centre. He was an Elder and Trustee of St. Andrew's congregation of the Church of Scotland, and partly responsible for the acquisition of The Glebe lands for St Andrew's. He was also a founding trustee of Queen's College.

Thomas McKay became quite wealthy and in 1837 he bought 1100 acres (4.5 km^{2}) east of the village. On the western edge of this new land he built in 1838 for himself a limestone Scottish Regency mansion which he named Rideau Hall, and which is today official residence of the Governor General of Canada. He also built Earnscliffe to house his daughter and son-in-law. The remainder of McKay's lands later became the village of Rockcliffe Park. McKay also brought the first railroad to the Ottawa area with the Prescott and Bytown Railway that had its terminus at a station near Sussex Drive just south of New Edinburgh.

McKay entered politics serving on Bytown's city council, and then the Legislative Assembly of Upper Canada from 1834 to 1841. From 1841 until his death in 1855, he served on the Legislative Council of the United Province of Canada.

Thomas McKay was interred in the Beechwood Cemetery in Ottawa. In New Edinburgh, the MacKay United Church is named in his memory.

== Works ==
Building	Year completed	Builder	Style	Source	Location	Image
McKay and McKinnon cloth mill		Thomas McKay		Library and Archives Canada, C-003853	Rideau Falls near Ottawa, Ontario	
Stone House currently the Bytown Museum	1827	Thomas McKay			Ottawa, Ontario	
Rideau Hall	1838	Thomas McKay	Scottish Regency		Ottawa, Ontario	
Earnscliffe	1855	Thomas McKay	Scottish Regency		Ottawa, Ontario	
