= Richard Robinson (fashion designer) =

Canadian fashion designer

Richard Robinson is a Canadian fashion designer based in Ottawa, Ontario. He is the proprietor of Richard Robinson Haute Couture, and operates the Richard Robinson Academy of Fashion Design.

== Career ==
Robinson entered the fashion business by working for Christian Dior and Yves Saint Laurent in their Paris ateliers. In 1969 he started his own fashion company in Ottawa.

In 1972, Robinson opened the Richard Robinson Fashion Design Academy. Each year in May the Academy mounts a fashion show to display the work of both Robinson and his students. The event is usually held at the Lac Leamy Hotel.

As well as ready-to wear clothing lines and his haute couture collections, Robinson has designed clothing for various celebrities, including the wives of at least three Prime Ministers.

Robinson operates a boutique on Sussex Drive in Ottawa. Each year he creates a special dress design to be unveiled on Canada Day at his boutique.
