= MacKay United Church =

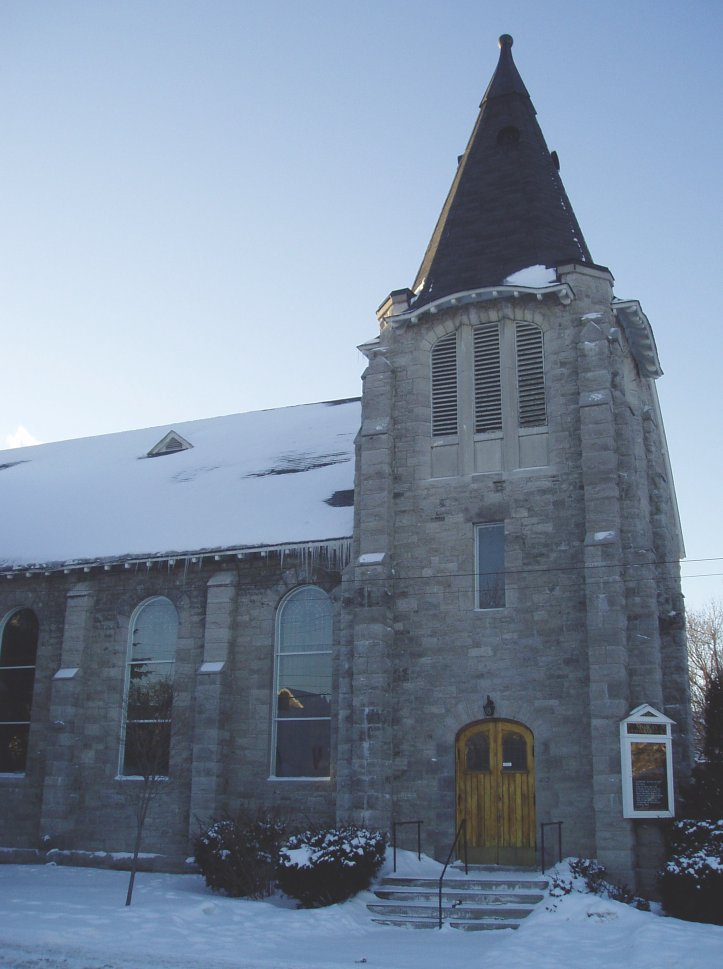
- MacKay United Church
- MacKay United Church
- 45.4405°N 75.6830°W
- Location: 39 Dufferin Road; Ottawa, Ontario; K1M 2H3
- Country: Canada
- Denomination: United Church of Canada
- Previous denomination: Presbyterian

History
- Status: Cathedral

Architecture
- Functional status: Active
- Architectural type: Norman-Gothic

MacKay United Church is a United Church of Canada church in the New Edinburgh neighbourhood of Ottawa, Ontario, Canada. The church is located at the intersection of 39 Dufferin and Mackay at the southwest corner of the Rideau Hall estate. MacKay's present minister is the Arnprior-born Reverend Peter Woods.

== History ==
The church was founded in 1875 on land donated by William MacKinnon, grandson of Thomas McKay, and the founder of New Edinburgh and namesake of the church. The Romanesque Revival style building was constructed from 1909-1910. The church retains an alternate spelling of Thomas McKay’s surname. During McKay’s lifetime, surname spellings were not always standardized, and both “McKay” and “MacKay” appear in historical usage.

The building was expanded in 1924 and the entire structure was demolished for a new building completed in 1910. It was originally called MacKay Presbyterian, but became MacKay United, on June 10, 1925. The building was given a Municipal designation under the Ontario Heritage Act, Section 29.
