= Gregory Henriquez =

Canadian architect

- Born: 1963; Winnipeg, Manitoba
- Education: Carleton University, McGill University
- Occupation: Architect
- Spouse: Deborah Katz
- Practice: Henriquez Partners Architects
- Projects: Woodward's Redevelopment
- Design: Mirvish Village in Toronto $5b Oakridge Park Redevelopment in Vancouver
- Website: henriquezpartners.com

Gregory Henriquez RCA (born 1963) is a Canadian architect who has designed community-based mixed-use residential, commercial and institutional projects in Vancouver, Toronto, Calgary and Seattle. He is the design principal of Henriquez Partners Architects with studios located in Vancouver, Toronto and more recently Calgary.

== Background ==
Henriquez was born in 1963, in Winnipeg, Manitoba, to artist/educator Carol Aaron and architect/artist Richard Henriquez. He received a bachelor's degree in architecture from Carleton University and studied in the history and theory master's program at McGill University, in both programs under Alberto Perez-Gomez. He joined his father's studio after completing his architectural education in 1989, and became its managing partner in 2005.

Among many other projects, Henriquez was involved in the redevelopment of the Woodward's Building, which at $475 million, was at the time (2004-2010), one of the biggest single site developments in Vancouver history. He negotiated with the City of Vancouver on behalf of the developer and consulted with community groups to maintain the project's financial feasibility and meet the neighbourhood's social requirements.

In his many books Towards an Ethical Architecture (2006), Body Heat (2010), Citizen City (2016), Ghetto: Sanctuary for Sale (2021) and How can we live together? (2024) Henriquez discusses the role of the architect in society, and explores the place of ethics, activism and social justice within contemporary practice.
