= Richard Henriquez =

Canadian architect

Richard George Henriquez
- Born: 5 February 1941 (age 85); Annotto Bay, Jamaica
- Education: Massachusetts Institute of Technology (1967); University of Manitoba (1964)
- Spouse: Carol Aaron
- Children: Gregory Henriquez and Alisa Henriquez
- Website: www.henriquezpartners.com

Richard George Henriquez (born 5 February 1941 in Annotto Bay, Jamaica) is a Canadian architect and artist known for founding Henriquez & Todd with Robert Todd in 1969 which evolved over 55 years to become the Henriquez Partners Architects of today. His projects are known for its blend of unique design with its historical context. His accumulation of work are celebrated by dozens of awards including the Royal Architectural Institute of Canada Gold Medal in 2005, Governor Generals Medal in 1994 and the Order of Canada in 2017.

Richard is currently a Principal Emeritus at Henriquez Partners, his son Gregory Henriquez assumed the role of Managing Partner in 2005.

== Design approach ==
Richard Henriquez was known for his focus on the place of memory and history in his work. He believed that contemporary buildings are disconnected with the past and so his architecture carries a memory which he calls "issue is continuity between the past, the future and the present, and making people aware of their place in time and space." In a particular interview, Henriquez notes that Roman cities were laid out by cardines (running north to south) and decumanus (running east to west), all in line with the rising sun. He believed that cities once had a relationship to nature, and wanted to take inspiration from the past. He incorporates historic elements in a variety of ways such as relating the archaeology of the site to the traditional mythic stories that were passed down the generation. He also explored the depths of spatial relationships beyond the quintessential floor heights, material, setback, etc. but in their cosmic and metaphorical relationships elements. Henriquez says his work is "not to invoke nostalgia but to rather give people a new way of looking at what they take for granted."

He was also known for bringing a distinct style of high-density urban design to Vancouver, designing buildings that have slim proportions, low rise buildings, view corridors and parks that create livable communities. A notable example would be the Sylvia hotel tower, with large glazing area and thin floorplates that influence the high rises of Vancouver for years to come.

== Childhood influences ==
Henriquez was born from a modest family. When Henriquez was three years old, a hurricane almost destroyed his family's home. Later that year, he discovered his father - an agricultural instructor who was Lancaster fighter pilot in World War 2 - was killed in action. Due to these circumstances, Henriquez and his siblings went on to live with their grandparents while the mother worked. During his time with his grandparents, Henriquez would hear stories on how his grandparents and his father lived in the past. Although he lacked first-hand contact with his father, he valued objects his father made before his passing such as wooden bowls and furniture. Henriquez comments that his interest in history may have stemmed from his absent father, inspiring the architectural work that he produced over the years.

Henriquez also credits his grand-uncle for his inspiration of pursuing architecture. His grand-uncle was a multifaceted artisan that was a sculptor, painter, architect and an engineer. This influenced young Henriquez to follow his footsteps and explored artistic endeavors such as creating sculptures out of limestone and painting. None of his other 2 brothers and 2 sisters followed the same artistic pursuits, although his older sister, Kay Levy, worked in the early days of the firm as the bookkeeper and office manager.

Growing up in Jamaica had affected Henriquez's design sensibility. In Jamaica, material was costly while labor was cheap and therefore, Henriquez believed that nothing of value should go to waste and should be instead reused.

== Education ==
Once Henriquez graduated from highschool, he immediately pursued his Bachelor of Architecture from the University of Manitoba in Canada from 1958 to 1964.

The program was highly technical and even included four years of structural engineering in its curriculum. The school provided Henriquez with a strong technical base and taught him the construction and how to build buildings, but all his work was still constrained to reality and any superfluous work was considered illegitimate.

Upon graduation, Henriquez returned to Jamaica to work for McMorris Sibley Robinson Architects. It was here where he took on over a dozen projects including corporate, cultural and domestic projects. Many of these residential projects, were situated on hilltop sites or steep slopes, giving Henriquez experience later in his life when he designs for Vancouver's hilly topography.

Henriquez eventually attended MIT (Massachusetts Institute of Technology) to complete his master's degree. It was here that he developed his theoretical and philosophical views in architecture that would be the basis of his work for years to come.

For his final thesis project, Henriquez developed a conceptual scheme of a satellite town for 100,000 people near Germantown, Maryland. His project was an exploration of flexibility, adaptability, which Henriquez puts as “allowing them freedom to live as they choose and meaningful choice as to where and how they live”. Henriquez had always designed for, however it was in this project when he started to develop his philosophical stances in architecture. The project was deeply influenced by his supervisor, Lubicz-Nycz who believed that architecture is spiritual, where it must honor the past and carry its narrative, while allowing future growth. This narrative approach becomes and integral part of Henriquez's design process in his future works.

== Selected projects ==
=== Sylvia Hotel Tower ===
The Sylvia Hotel Tower, built in 1984 was an addition to the Edward Sylvia Hotel (a once popular Vancouver hotel, and a current designated heritage landmark) located near the Vancouver waterfront. Henriquez designed the building by drawing inspiration from its unique site conditions and adjacencies. On the site's immediate east are the 1958 Ocean Towers, both eighteen-stories tall, slab-form apartment building built in Miami Modern style. On its west side is the Sylvia Hotel, built originally as a luxury apartment but was converted to be a luxury hotel to keep up with the finances during the economic downturn of the roaring twenties. The Sylvia hotel had a "streaky bacon style" aesthetic, meaning it was a brick building with its base and corner cornice capitals made of strips of stone in a lighter color. The main tower itself contained both aesthetic elements of the historic Sylvia tower and the more progressive Ocean Towers of the time. However, the design avoids typical postmodernist strategy of combining bits and pieces of the building to create a hybrid building, but instead, the two polarizing characteristics of the adjacent buildings are distinctly separated and juxtaposed. It is analogous to a clash between the polarizing "black" against the "white" rather than the typical homogenous "grey" of postmodern design. On the seaward corner of the building are floor-to-ceiling glazing that reveal the building's concrete structural frame, and oriented at a 30-degree angle against the cartesian site grid which frames the mountainous views across the waters.

The building also introduced the "small-plate" style tower to Vancouver, which has become a defining characteristic of Vancouver's downtown peninsula high-rises. In 1999, Canadian Architect magazine deemed the tower to be one of the most influential Canadian buildings of the twentieth century.

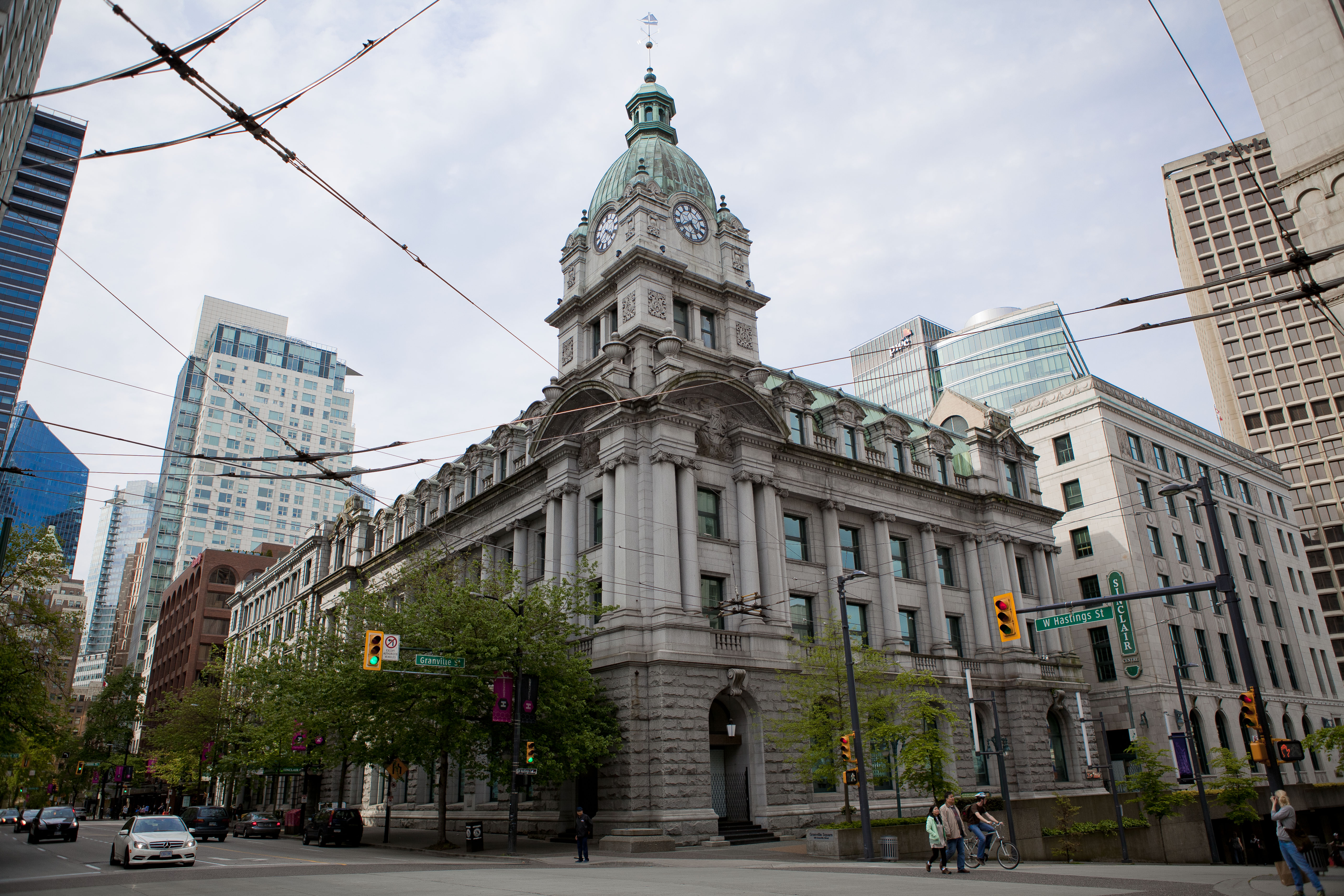
Outside view of the Sinclair Centre

=== Sinclair Centre ===
The Sinclair Centre, is a federal government office complex with a shopping complex at grade that was built by Henriquez Partners Architects in collaboration with Toby Russell Buckwell Architects in 1986. The Sinclair Centre was originally four separate historic buildings, but the renovation unified the buildings into one shopping mall by connecting them in a glazed atrium. The federal government's wanted to have more of a presence of public services in Vancouver. Therefore, The program of Sinclair Centre was called to transform an entire block into government office complex mixed with retail and public functions and replacing the image of the building from being austere to being open and accessible.

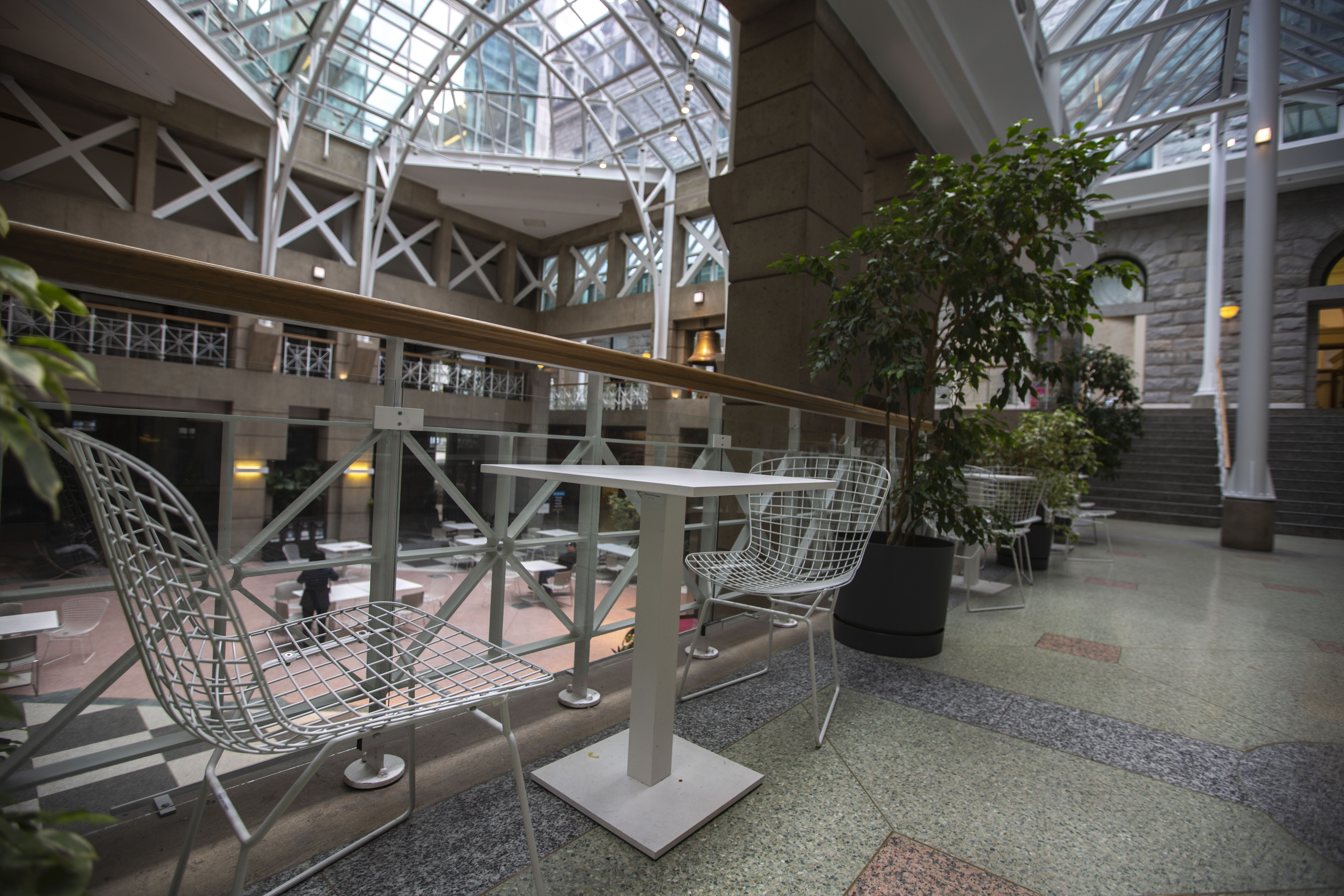
Interior view of the Sinclair Centre

A main objective in the architecture is to create an open concept space, and therefore the creation of a T-shaped galleria. The design of the building preserved each of the four building's historic character and individuality while the glazing was designed in a neutral manner.

The building is named after James Sinclair, a businessman and politician that was the former president of Lafarge Cement in North America and the maternal grandfather of Canadian Prime Minister Justin Trudeau.

=== Memory Theatre ===
Memory Theatre is an exhibition showcasing twenty-five years of accomplishment by Richard Henriquez. It was a travelling exhibition co-produced by the Canadian Centre for Architecture and Vancouver Art Gallery in 1993. The exhibition was physically a cylindrical structure that was held up by a surveyor's tripod and accessed by a bridge. Once visitors enter the cylindrical structure, they will be surrounded by ten cabinets with glass cases that contain found objects ranging from a diversity of architectural models, notes, sculptures, drawings, letters and photographs that demonstrate Henriquez's creative process. Right at the centre of the Theatre is a cylindrical globe. On top of the pole of the globe is Vancouver. By picking a point on the model, the device can be made to point towards the true objective. The architect did so as a way to contrast the Copernican model of the earth by having the earth as the centre of the universe. It shows that the present time and place to be conscious of one's narrative. as memory is used to pinpoint the present.
