= Lester B. Pearson Building =

Coordinates: 45°26′13.13″N 75°41′45.79″W

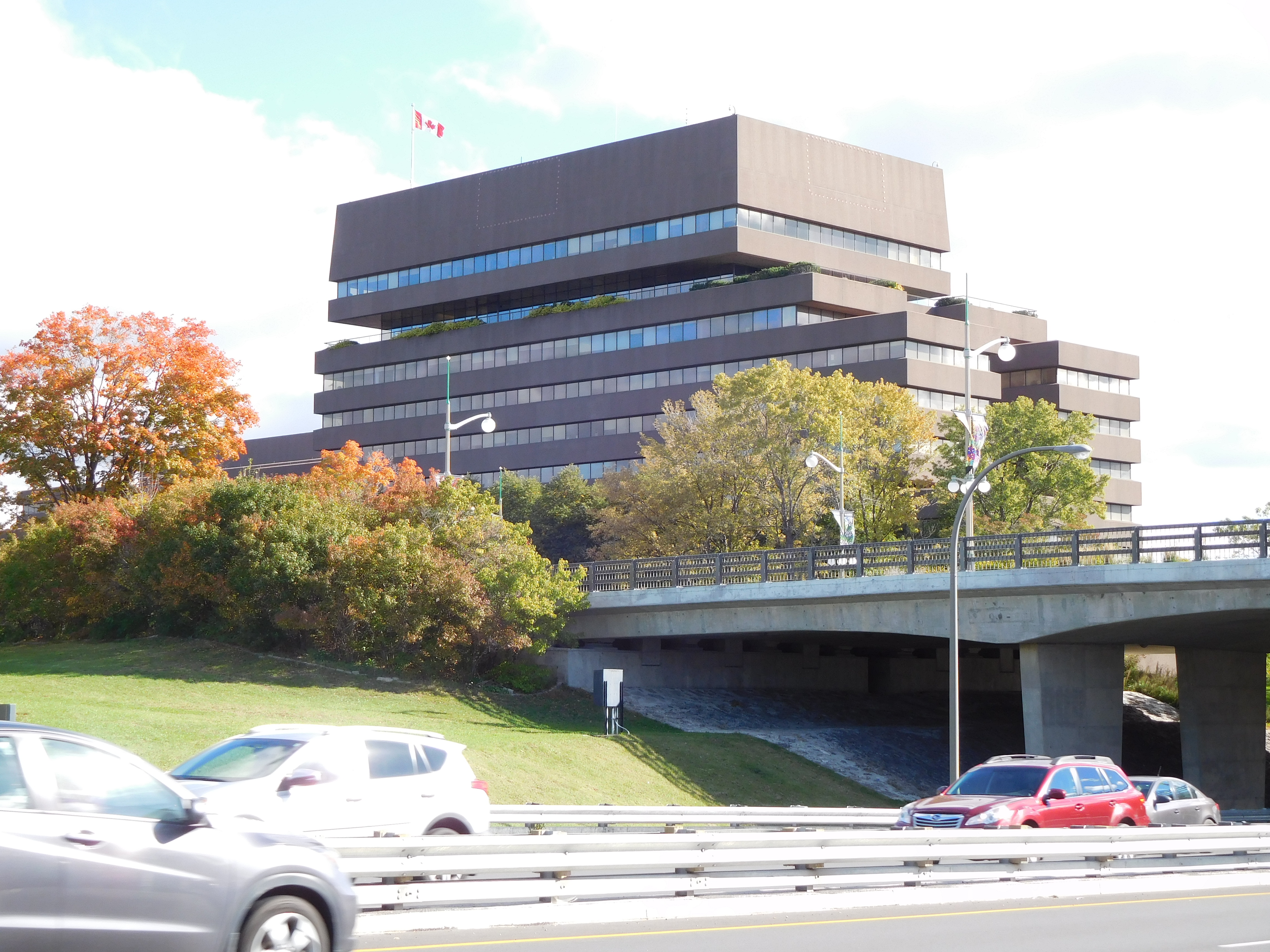
- The Lester B. Pearson Building as seen from the Macdonald-Cartier Bridge.
- Interactive map of the Lester B. Pearson Building area

General information
- Type: Office building
- Architectural style: Modern
- Location: Ottawa, Ontario, Canada, 125 Sussex Drive, Ottawa, Canada
- Current tenants: Global Affairs Canada
- Named for: Lester B. Pearson
- Construction started: 1970
- Completed: 1973

Design and construction
- Architecture firm: WZMH Architects

The Lester B. Pearson Building is an office building in Ottawa, Ontario, Canada. It is located at 125 Sussex Drive in the Lower Town neighbourhood and currently serves as the headquarters of Global Affairs Canada. It was officially opened on 1 August 1973 by Queen Elizabeth II. It is named after Lester B. Pearson, former Prime Minister of Canada and external affairs minister which has earned it the nickname "Fort Pearson".

The building was designed by the Toronto-based architectural firm of Webb Zerafa Menkes and is described as "late modern with an influence of Brutalism". The building consists of four "towers" ranging from 4 to 10 storeys, of which three are interconnected from the first to the fifth floor. In 2013, the Department of Public Works and Government Services designated the office complex a Federal Heritage Building for its "historical associations, and its architectural and environmental values".

In 2019, work began towards renovating the building, with major changes being made to both the interior and exterior. Walls will be torn down and individual offices removed in favour of a new activity-based working model. The project is estimated to cost $700 million and is scheduled to be completed in 2028.
