= King Edward Avenue (Ottawa) =

Avenue in Ottawa

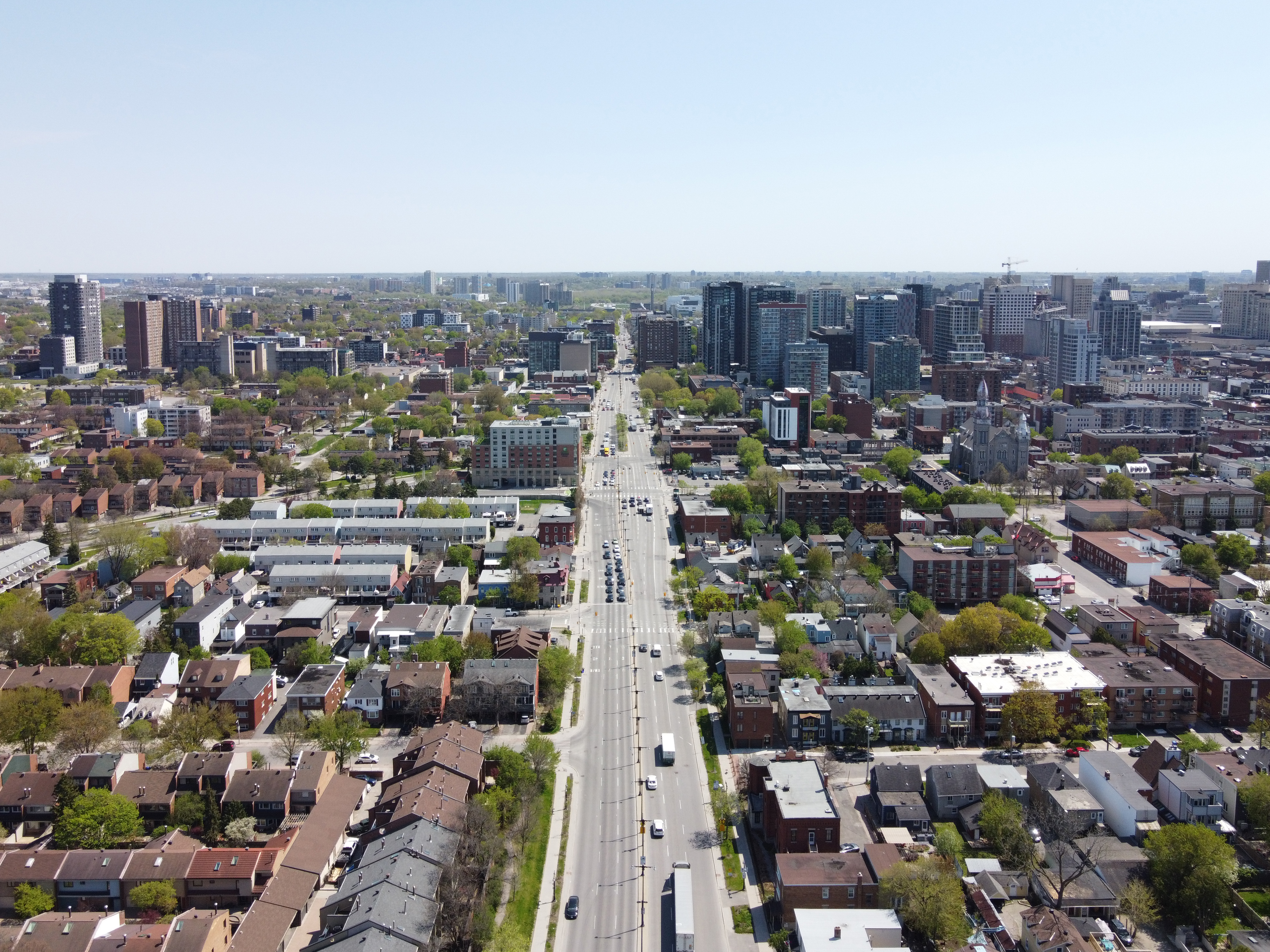
Aerial view of King Edward Avenue in 2025

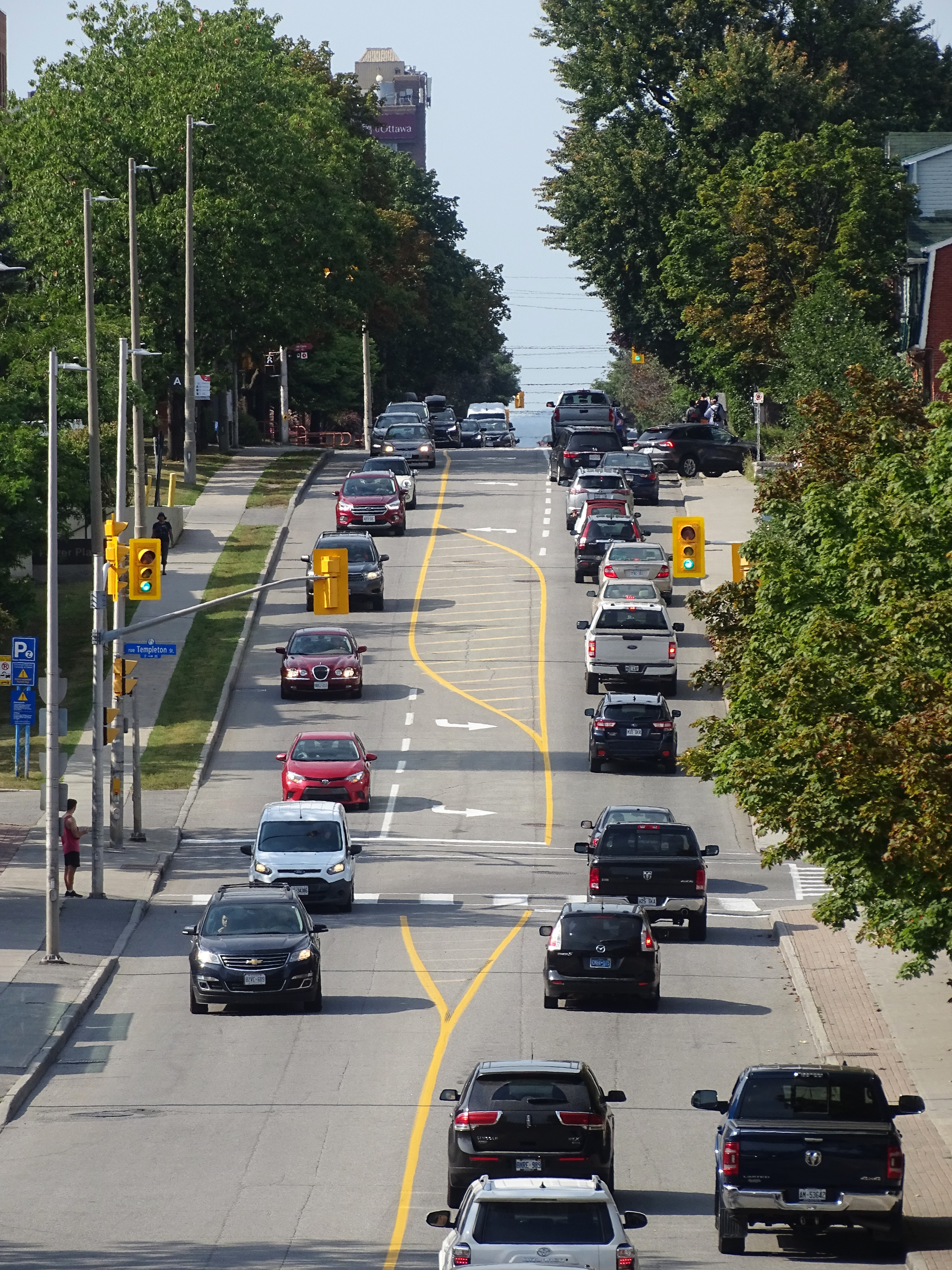
South end of King Edward Avenue passing through the University of Ottawa campus

King Edward Avenue is a major thoroughfare in the eastern part of Ottawa, Ontario, Canada. Despite being a municipal road, a portion of the street is designated as part of Canada's National Highway System, as part of an interconnecting route between Ontario Highway 417 in Ottawa and Quebec Autoroute 5 in Gatineau.

King Edward Avenue runs from the Macdonald-Cartier Bridge southward to the Queensway. The street was originally named "King Street" after King George IV, and was renamed in 1901 to honour King Edward VII. In the 19th century the street had the "by-wash" running through its centre, an open sewer that ran from the Rideau Canal to the Rideau River.

The by-wash was removed and replaced with a tree lined boulevard, making King Edward one of Ottawa's prettiest streets in the early 20th century. With the construction of the Macdonald-Cartier Bridge and the Queensway, however, the street became congested with large commercial vehicles and quickly became dirty and dangerous. In 2013, the National Capital Commission recommended that a new bridge be built serving as a new truck route for access to Gatineau. A month later, the government of Ontario cancelled its participation on the proposal. Another proposal to build a tunnel connecting Highway 417 to the Macdonald-Cartier Bridge was considered. On January 30, 2025, the federal government announced a timeline for the construction of a bridge between Ottawa and Gatineau along the so-called "Kettle Island" route by 2034.

King Edward cuts directly down the centre of two of central Ottawa's oldest neighbourhoods, Lower Town and Sandy Hill. It marks the primary eastern boundary of the University of Ottawa campus, although a smaller number of university buildings are still located east of the street. Rideau Street divides both Sandy Hill and Lower Town, while the Rideau River, Rideau Canal, and the Ottawa River serve as natural boundaries to the rest of these two communities. The Byward Market is a sub-component of Lower Town.

== See also ==
- List of roads in Ottawa
- Royal eponyms in Canada
