= Ottawa Memorial =

Monument in Ottawa, Ontario, Canada

- Commonwealth War Graves Commission
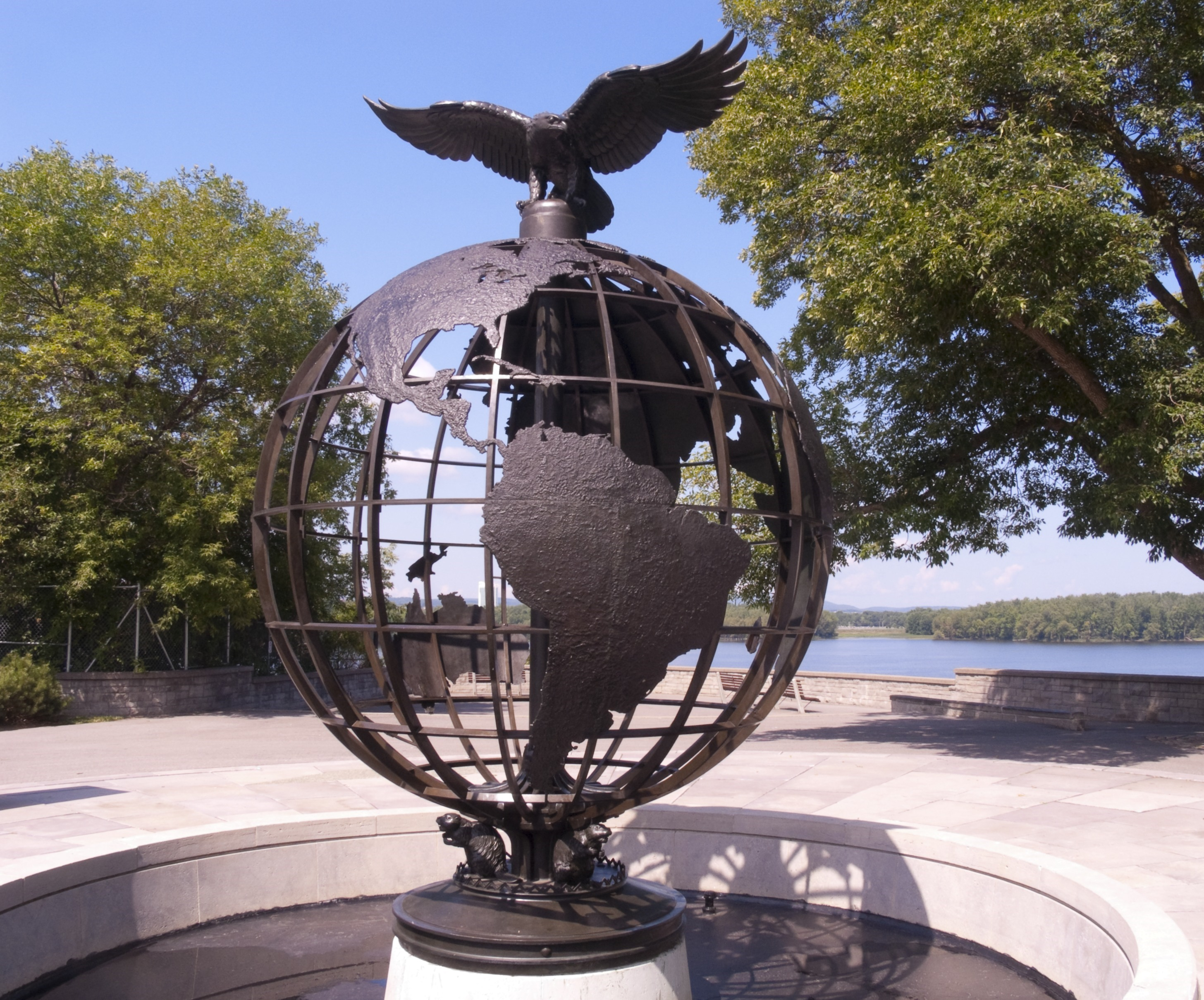
- The Ottawa Memorial (Ottawa, Canada)
- For missing World War II Canadian air personnel
- Unveiled: 1 July 1959
- Location: 45°26′27.08″N 075°41′45.90″W near Ottawa, Canada

The Ottawa Memorial is a monument in Ottawa, Ontario, that "commemorates by name almost 800 men and women who lost their lives while serving or training with the Air Forces of the Commonwealth in Canada, the West Indies and the United States and who have no known grave. " Located on Sussex Drive overlooking the Ottawa River near the Rideau Falls, the monument was unveiled in 1959 by Elizabeth II, Queen of Canada. It is maintained by the Commonwealth War Graves Commission. During the Second World War, 798 men and women killed with Commonwealth air forces in or over Canadian territory.

The memorial lists the names, ranks and nations of origin of almost 800 service personnel, ordered by the year of their death, on two semi-circular walls that surround a small pool containing a sculpture of the world with an eagle perched on top. Plaques in English and French contain the following text:

In the Second World War air power played an increasingly important role in offensive and defensive capacities.

At the start of the war there was a shortage of aircraft and trained pilots. The United Kingdom was considered too vulnerable to attack and so training centres were established elsewhere. Bases in North America trained over 137,000 Commonwealth air crew, making a vital contribution to the Allied victory, while much needed aircraft and supplies were ferried to the United Kingdom from the United States and Canada by both civilian and air force personnel.
This memorial, unveiled by Queen Elizabeth II in 1959, commemorates by name almost 800 men and women who lost their lives while serving or training with the Air Forces of the Commonwealth in Canada, the West Indies and the United States and who have no known grave. Their names are arranged according to year of death, force and rank.

The Commonwealth War Graves Commission is responsible for the maintenance of graves and memorials in some 150 countries which commemorate around 1,700,000 members of the Commonwealth forces who died in the two world wars. The war dead commemorated here and elsewhere include those of several different faiths and of none.

== See also ==
- British Commonwealth Air Training Plan
- Royal Canadian Air Force
- Royal Air Force
- Royal Australian Air Force
- Monarchy in Ontario
