= Former Geological Survey of Canada Building =

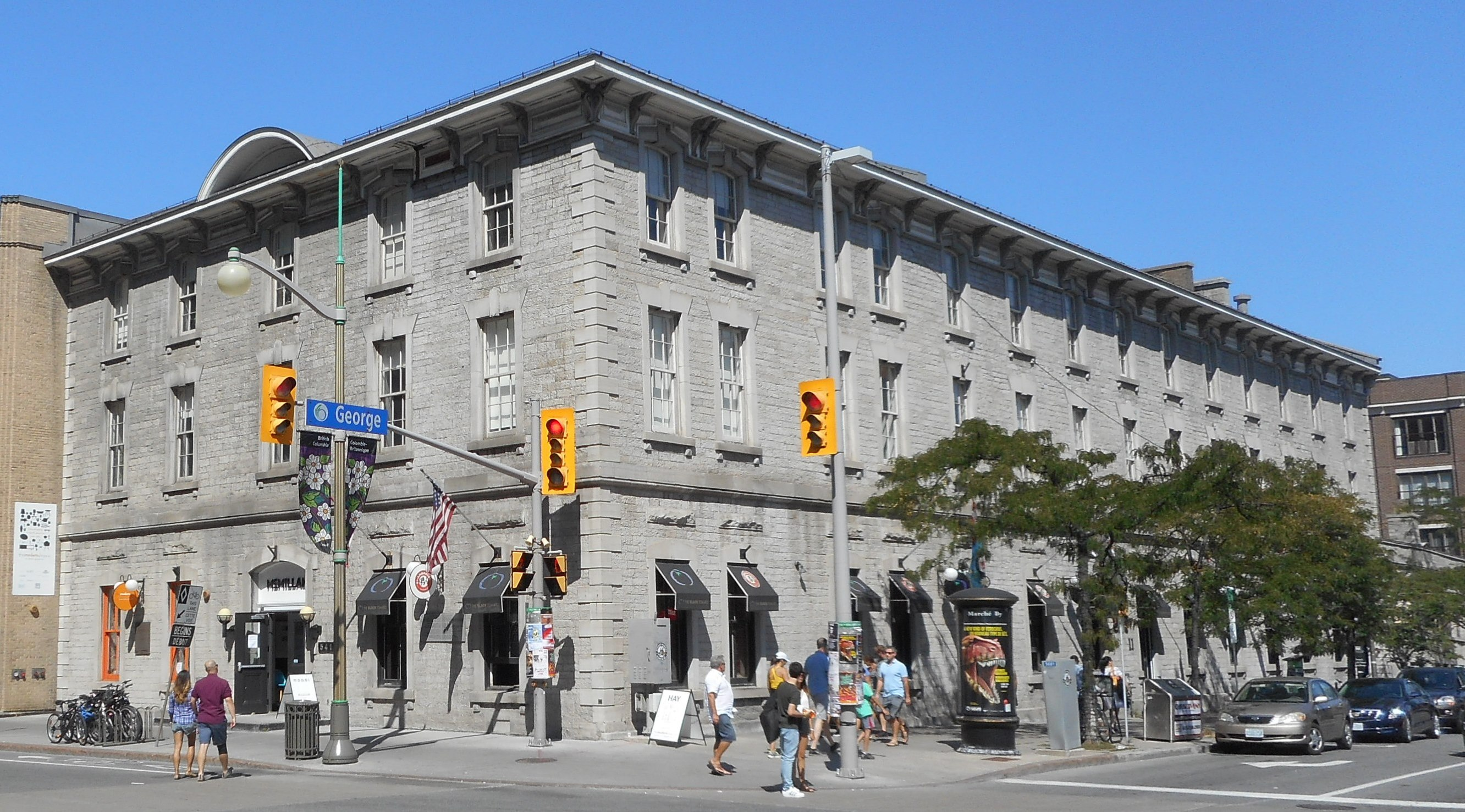
- The building in 2016

- Location within Ottawa
- Former names: Old Mines Building, Clarendon Hotel
- Alternative names: Ancien édifice de la Commission géologique du Canada

General information
- Architectural style: Classical, Italianate
- Location: 541 Sussex Drive, Ottawa, Ontario, Canada
- Coordinates: 45.426514°N 75.693933°W
- Completed: 1863
- Renovated: 1879, 1881, 1917
- Owner: The King in Right of Canada
- Landlord: Government of Canada

National Historic Site of Canada
- Official name: Former Geological Survey of Canada Building National Historic Site
- Designated: 1955

The Former Geological Survey of Canada Building (French: Ancien édifice de la Commission géologique du Canada) is a three-storey, stone building located at the intersection of Sussex Drive and George Street in the Byward Market area of Ottawa, Ontario, Canada. It is named for its former occupant, the Geological Survey of Canada. The building was designated a National Historic Site of Canada in 1955 as it is one of the oldest remaining buildings in Ottawa, and over the years it has served as home to various public and cultural institutions.

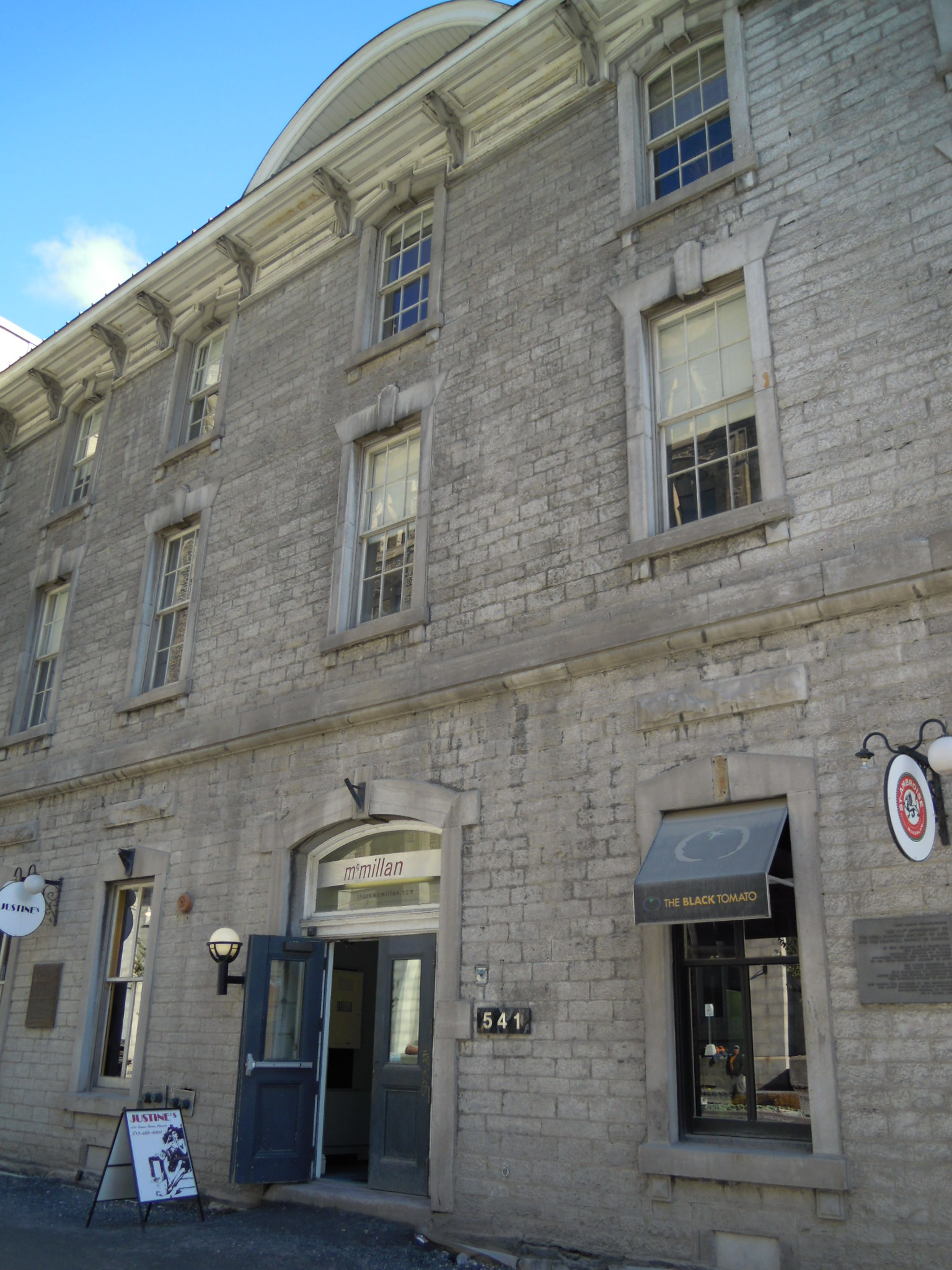
The Sussex Drive facade

The oldest part of the building (the George Street wing) was constructed in 1863 under the ownership of James Skead, a local businessman, and Edward Griffen. Griffen soon after sold his share to Skead and the building became known as Skead's Hotel. From 1864 to 1871, it was leased to the Crown and served as a military barracks, known as the George Street Barracks. It sat vacant for several years before being purchased in 1875 by restaurateur William Mills, who operated it for a few years as the Clarendon House Hotel. After numerous scandals, including the alleged assault of Mills' daughter by F. A. Martin, MPP for Ste. Agathe, Manitoba, the Clarendon was closed by 1877.

The Government of Canada purchased the property in 1879 to be used as the headquarters of the Geological Survey of Canada.

Soon after its purchase, the building hosted the inaugural exhibit of the Canadian Academy of Arts in March 1880. The works from this exhibit later formed the initial collection of the National Gallery of Canada. Later that year, the building was retrofitted to serve as the offices and museum of what was then called the Geological and Natural History Survey of Canada. The museum and its collections, which attracted 9,549 visitors in its first year, would later become the genesis of Canada's national museums.

The Sussex Drive section was rebuilt in 1881 on its original footprint. The Geological Survey of Canada remained in the building until 1911 when it moved to the Victoria Memorial Museum Building. The building was later renovated to accommodate the federal Department of Mines, and a new laboratory was added to the George Street wing in 1917.
