= Macdonald-Cartier Bridge =

Canadian bridge connecting Ottawa to Gatineau crossing the Ottawa River

Macdonald-Cartier Bridge Pont Cartier-Macdonald
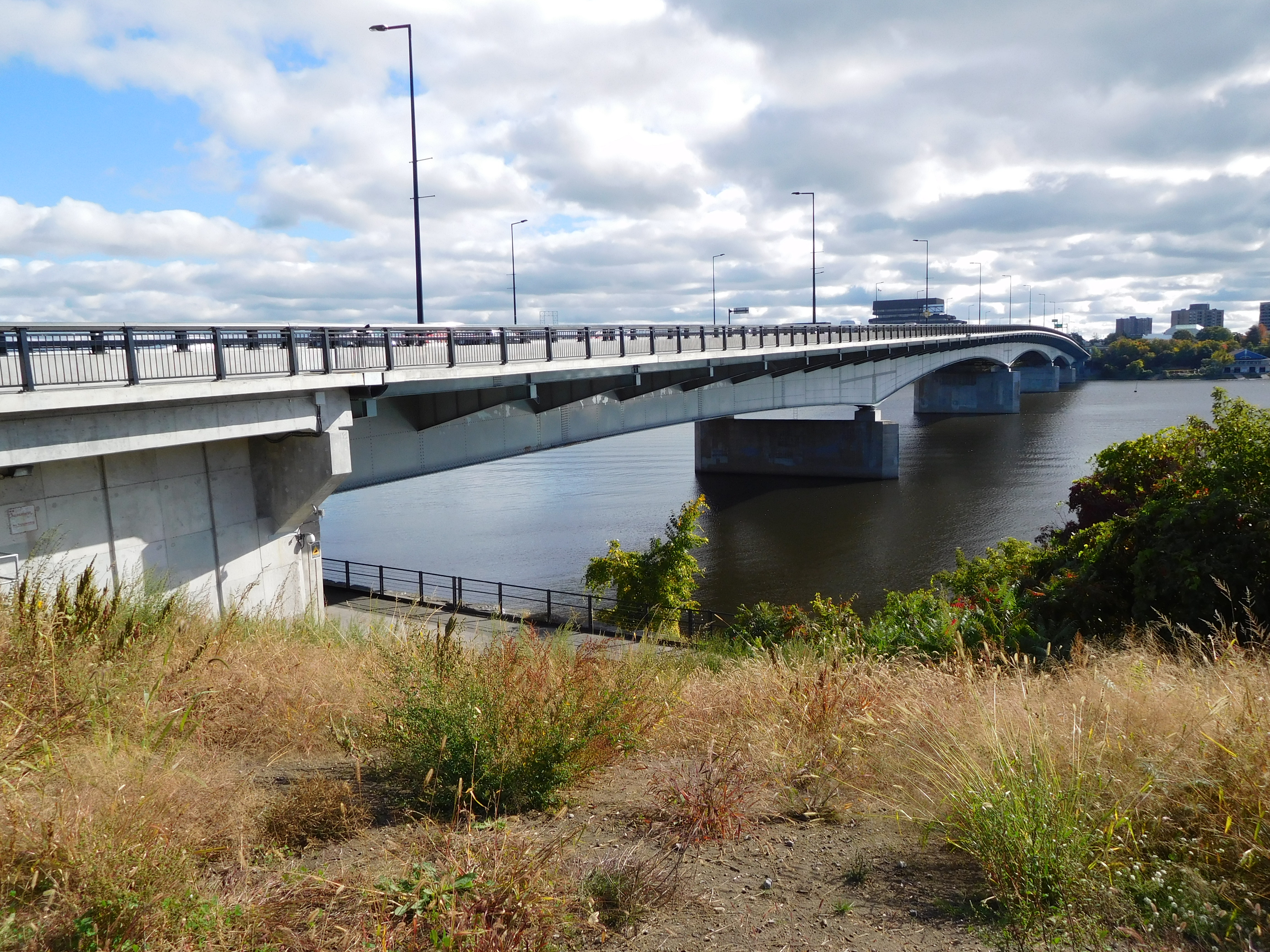
- The bridge seen from Jacques Cartier Park, Gatineau
- Coordinates: 45°26′12″N 75°42′9″W
- Carries: A-5; King Edward Avenue
- Crosses: Ottawa River
- Locale: Ottawa, Ontario; Gatineau, Quebec
- Official name: Macdonald-Cartier Bridge
- Owner: Government of Canada
- Maintained by: Public Services and Procurement Canada

Characteristics
- Design: steel girder truss bridge
- Total length: 618 metres (2,028 ft)

History
- Construction start: 1963
- Opened: October 15, 1965

Location
- Interactive map of Macdonald-Cartier Bridge; Pont Cartier-Macdonald

The Macdonald-Cartier Bridge (French: Pont Cartier-Macdonald) is a bridge connecting Ottawa, Ontario, with Gatineau, Quebec. The bridge is a 618-metre-long (2,028-foot) continuous steel box girder bridge and carries six lanes of traffic. It links King Edward Avenue and Sussex Drive in Ottawa with Autoroute 5 in Quebec. It is the easternmost bridge linking Ottawa to Gatineau, running just east of the Alexandra Bridge.

The bridge was built from 1963 to 1965 by the federal government and the governments of the two provinces. It is owned and maintained by Public Works and Government Services Canada. It was named after John A. Macdonald and George-Étienne Cartier, joint premiers of the Province of Canada, and the name is representative of the link between French and English Canada.

There are sidewalks on both sides of the bridge intended for use by pedestrians and cyclists. Immediately after the bridge on the Gatineau side, the road becomes part of the Autoroute where cyclists and pedestrians are prohibited. However, they can then use paths leading to Laurier Street.

The Ottawa side was to connect with Vanier Parkway, and some piers where it would cross the Rideau River remain from the Canadian Pacific Railway's Sussex Street Subdivision, but this was cancelled because the route would have taken much of New Edinburgh Park. Instead, King Edward Avenue was widened up to the one-way pair of St. Patrick Street and Murray Street to the St. Patrick Street Bridge over the Rideau River, which connects with the north end of Vanier Parkway. This provides a four-lane connection between the bridge and Highway 417. Construction is now underway to realign the entrance ramps on the Ontario side, removing any possibility of further extensions.

== See also ==
- List of bridges in Canada
- List of bridges in Ottawa
- List of crossings of the Ottawa River
