= Lower Town =

Lowertown
- Neighbourhood
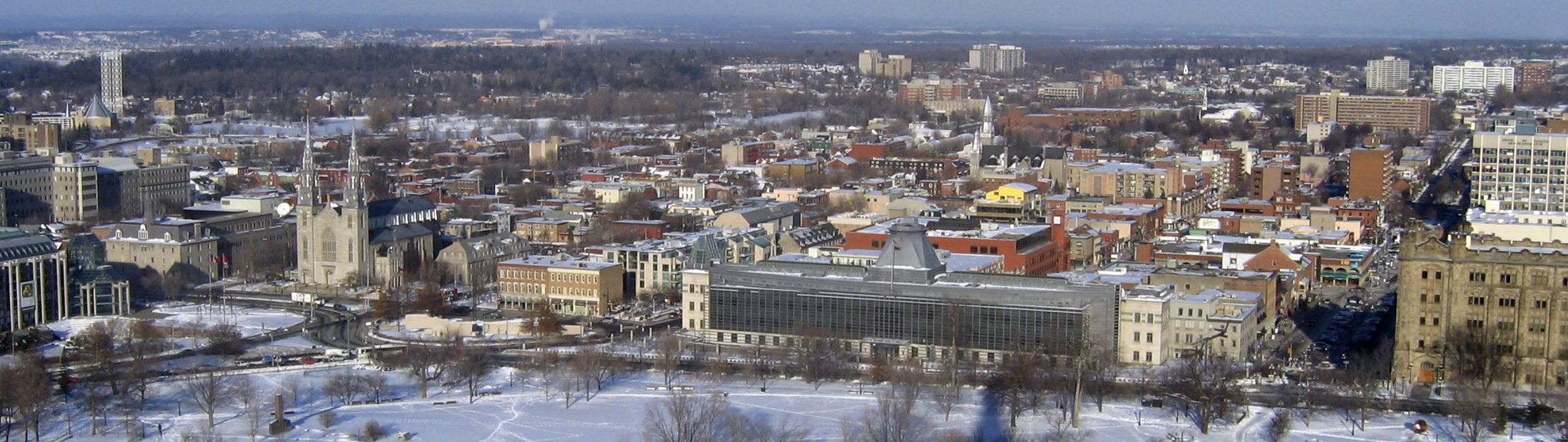
- View over Lowertown from the west

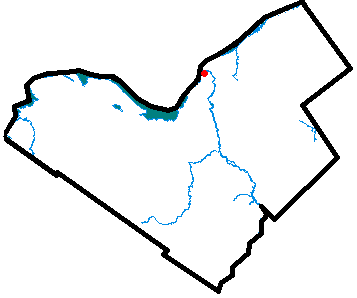
- Location of Lowertown in Ottawa
- Coordinates: 45°26′00″N 75°41′30″W
- Country: Canada
- Province: Ontario
- City: Ottawa

Government
  - MPs: Mona Fortier
  - MPPs: Lucille Collard
  - Councillors: Stéphanie Plante
  - Governing body: Lowertown Community Association
  - President: Sylvie Bigras
- Elevation: 60 m (200 ft)

Population (2021)
  - Total: 12,824
- Canada 2021 Census
- Time zone: UTC-5 (Eastern (EST))

Lower Town (also spelled "Lowertown" (French: la Basse-Ville) is a neighbourhood in Rideau-Vanier Ward in central Ottawa, Ontario, Canada, to the east of downtown. It is the oldest neighbourhood of the city, with construction beginning in 1826. It includes the commercial Byward Market area in the south-western part, and is predominantly residential in the north and east.

It was historically French Canadian and Irish, and is to this day home to many Franco-Ontarian families, businesses and institutions.

== Geography ==
Lowertown is bounded by Rideau Street to the south, the Ottawa River to the west and north and the Rideau River to the east.

=== Sub neighbourhoods ===
The neighbourhood is often divided into three distinct sections, Lowertown East (east of King Edward Avenue), Lowertown West (west of King Edward) and the Byward Market. Lowertown East can be further divided into "the Wedge" (also called Bordeleau Park), located north of St. Patrick Street, "English" Lowertown, located east of Cobourg Street, and "Lower Lowertown", located west of Cobourg. Both Lowertown West and the Byward Market were designated official heritage conservation districts by the city in 1994 and 1991, respectively.

== History ==
The neighbourhood is the oldest in the City of Ottawa, and was first settled in 1826 by labourers and workmen, many hired to build the Rideau Canal by Col. John By. The community was laid out in accordance to the instructions of Lord Dalhousie, Governor General of the Canadas, along with "Uppertown", today's Downtown Ottawa. The neighbourhood was built between two plateaus on the site of a cedar swamp, and was divided in a Georgian style of town planning.

Land was granted following the passing of the Vesting Act in 1843. Early development of the neighbourhood was mostly speculative with the establishment of a railway, and Ottawa being named the capital of the Province of Canada in 1857. The area experienced a construction boom from the 1870s onward until the outbreak of World War I.

For much of its history, it was home to a large working class French Catholic population, but was also home to Irish Catholics, Jews, and Italians. When the neighbourhood was settled, many of the French settlers were timber workmen, while the Irish helped build the Canal. In distinction to the wealthier Uppertown, properties in Lowertown could only be leased for 30 years, a restriction not lifted until the 1860s. Uppertown would be home to the city's wealthier Protestant populations of English and Scottish descent. Toward the end of the 19th Century, the Irish Catholic population decreased, as they moved to other parts of Ottawa. At the beginning of the 20th Century, the neighbourhood shifted from its working class roots as it began to be populated with civil servants.

After World War II, Lowertown East was targeted by the city for urban renewal projects, with the first homes being expropriated by the National Capital Commission in 1962. Following the construction of the Macdonald-Cartier Bridge in 1965, King Edward Avenue was expanded in an attempt to accommodate increased traffic volumes. From 1967 to 1977 the city continued to expropriate housing in Lowertown East, and built community housing in its stead. Approximately 1,400 families were forced to move as a result.

Beginning in the 1980s, developers began renovating and reselling homes in Lowertown West for much higher prices, and attracted more English speaking residents with higher incomes, causing that section of the neighbourhood to gentrify. The construction of the Rideau Centre in 1983 also caused property values to increase. Urban renewal in the east and gentrification in the west caused the neighbourhood's Francophone character to severely diminish during this time, as much of the Francophone middle class population moved to the suburbs.

== Cityscape ==
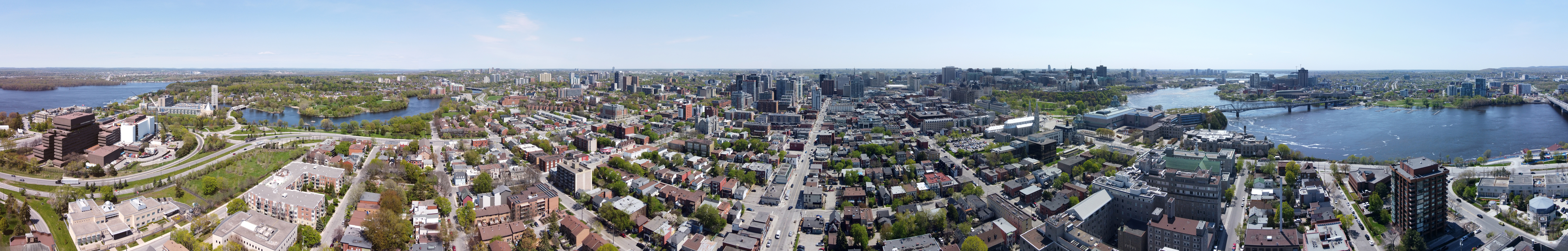
Aerial view of Lower Town in 2025

== Public facilities ==
- Lowertown Pool - a public in-ground swimming pool with rope & diving board. Sauna & change rooms on-site. Ample free parking available.
- Champagne Bath - a public swimming pool and gym that originally served as a bath house.

== Population ==
Historical population
Year	Pop.	±%
1951	24,247	—
1956	20,879	−13.9%
1961	19,944	−4.5%
1966	16,543	−17.1%
1971	12,828	−22.5%
1976	10,660	−16.9%
1981	9,790	−8.2%
1986	10,535	+7.6%
1991	10,545	+0.1%
1996	10,463	−0.8%
2001	11,134	+6.4%
2006	11,377	+2.2%
2011	12,183	+7.1%
2016	12,856	+5.5%
2021	13,529	+5.2%
Populations calculated by combining Census Tracts 5050055.00, 5050054.00, 5050056.00 and 5050053.00, and do not line up perfectly with neighbourhood boundaries. Source:

The total population of Lower Town (including Porter Island), according to the Canada 2021 Census, is 12,824.

=== Ethnic diversity ===
According to the City of Ottawa website, there are roughly 4,180 native English-speakers in Lower Town, 3,530 Francophones, and 2,235 with other mother tongues. Lower Town is home to a wide variety of immigrants and visible minorities, of which there are 2,495.

The Francophone population of Lower Town has declined significantly since the end of World War II. According to the 1961 Canadian census, there were 14,680 Francophones in Lower Town, compared to just 4,257 Anglophones. Anglophones began to outnumber Francophones in around the 1980s. In 1971, the neighbourhood was 68 per cent Francophone, dropping to 39 per cent by 1991.

Lowertown's population is rather diverse. Its main stretch along Rideau Street is very bustling and includes many African, Asian, South Asian, Caribbean, and Lebanese businesses, a large grocery store, the Rideau Branch of the Ottawa Public Library, and an Orthodox Jewish synagogue.

In combining the four census tracts that roughly correspond to the neighbourhood, the 2021 Canadian census reported that 21.7% of the population identified as ethnically French, French Canadian or Franco-Ontarian, 16.5% Irish, 13.2% English, 12.5% Scottish, 8.7% Canadian, 6.7% German, 5.2% Chinese, 3.7% Italian, 2.9% Indian, 2.1% Dutch, 1.9% Ukrainian, 1.8% Russian, 1.6% Welsh, 1.4% Somali, 1.4% Iranian, 1.3% Jewish, 1.3% Haitian, 1.2% Congolese, 1.2% Spanish, 1.2% Hungarian, 1.2% Lebanese, 1.1% Romanian, and 1.0% Rwandan. In terms of languages, 53.0% of the neighbourhood reported their mother tongue as being English, while 26.1% reported it being French. Other prevalent languages in Lowertown include Mandarin (3.2%), Arabic (3.0%), and Spanish (2.5%). About a quarter of the neighbourhood (25.5%) remains Catholic, 2.9% is Anglican, 1.9% Pentecostal, 1.4% Christian Orthodox, 1.4% United Church, 11.0% Other Christian, 8.4% Muslim, 1.5% Jewish and 1.4% Hindu. Four-in-ten (42.0%) reported no religion.

== Crime ==
Byward Market and Lower Town have been and are usually ranked among the top neighbourhoods for repeated calls for services and resources from the city. Byward Market and Lower Town had on average 6.5 shooting incidents each year from 2016-2019 out of a total of 73.5 yearly for the same period in Ottawa, representing roughly 9% of the city’s shooting incidents taking place in the neighbourhood. The Lowertown Community Association has been active in advocating for more resources for policing and support services. According to a 2018 report commissioned by the community association, crimes against individuals are 3 times higher and crimes against property are 2 times higher than the city average, due to the high number of bars in the neighbourhood as the nightlife and entertainment centre of the city. The Ottawa Police Service deployed a neighbourhood resource team to the ByWard Market and Lowertown since 2020. The Ottawa Police Services 2021 Annual Report found that Rideau Vanier had 5,593 crimes reported (11,165.9 crimes/100,000 people) the second highest rate after Somerset Ward.

== Modern Urbanization ==
As part of the Gréber Plan for Ottawa, new parkways, roads and bridges were constructed in the post-war period as a plan for urban renewal and "improvement" of Ottawa. This period saw major upheaval in the area as dozens of city blocks and hundreds of historic homes were systematically demolished to make way for expanded roads and new development. However, while the redevelopment was done in Lower Town, neighbouring areas opposed the plans, leaving the current incomplete solution to traffic through the area, heavy truck traffic, and poor urban streetscape for Lowertown residents to cope with.

=== King Edward Avenue ===
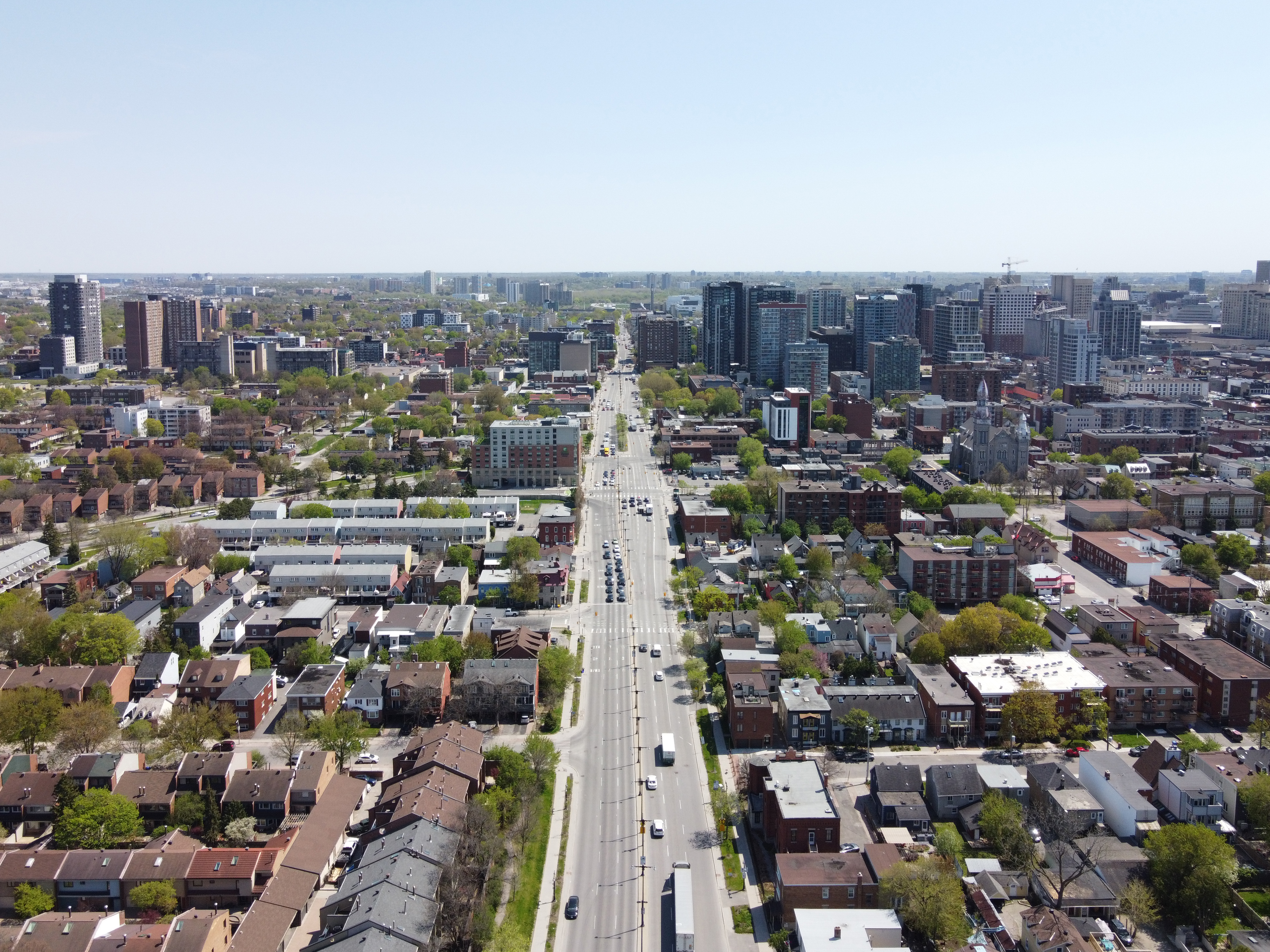
Aerial view of Kings Edward Avenue in 2025

Today, King Edward Avenue is a six lane main road running north–south through the centre of the neighbourhood. It is connected on its north to the MacDonald Cartier Bridge, a main connection with Gatineau, Quebec, which leads to heavy traffic travelling to and from Gatineau through the area. The traffic exits Lower Town either to the east along St. Patrick or to the south along Rideau and Nicholas to the 417 highway, as south of Rideau, King Edward is a four-lane (and further south, two-lane) road through the Sandy Hill residential neighbourhood with no heavy truck traffic allowed.

The street is so large and so busy that it exists as a major barrier between the east and west halves of Lowertown. Since it is the main truck route between Ottawa and Gatineau there are large numbers of tractor trailers travelling through the core of Ottawa daily, along with tens of thousands of commuters in cars. It is one of the highest accident sites in Ottawa.

The road from the bridge was intended to connect to a new Vanier Parkway to the north of the neighbourhood, across Green Island and Maple Island. This connector was never built because of political opposition, and instead St. Patrick Street east of King Edward was built into a major four-lane thoroughfare cutting through the neighbourhood. The end of the connector from the bridge instead connects to King Edward at a sharp turn where the connector would have continued directly to the east.

King Edward was itself rebuilt into a six-lane major thoroughfare from Sussex Drive to Rideau Street, and the plan was to continue the six-lane through Sandy Hill to connect to the Queensway (417) highway. This also was never built.

=== Rideau Street ===
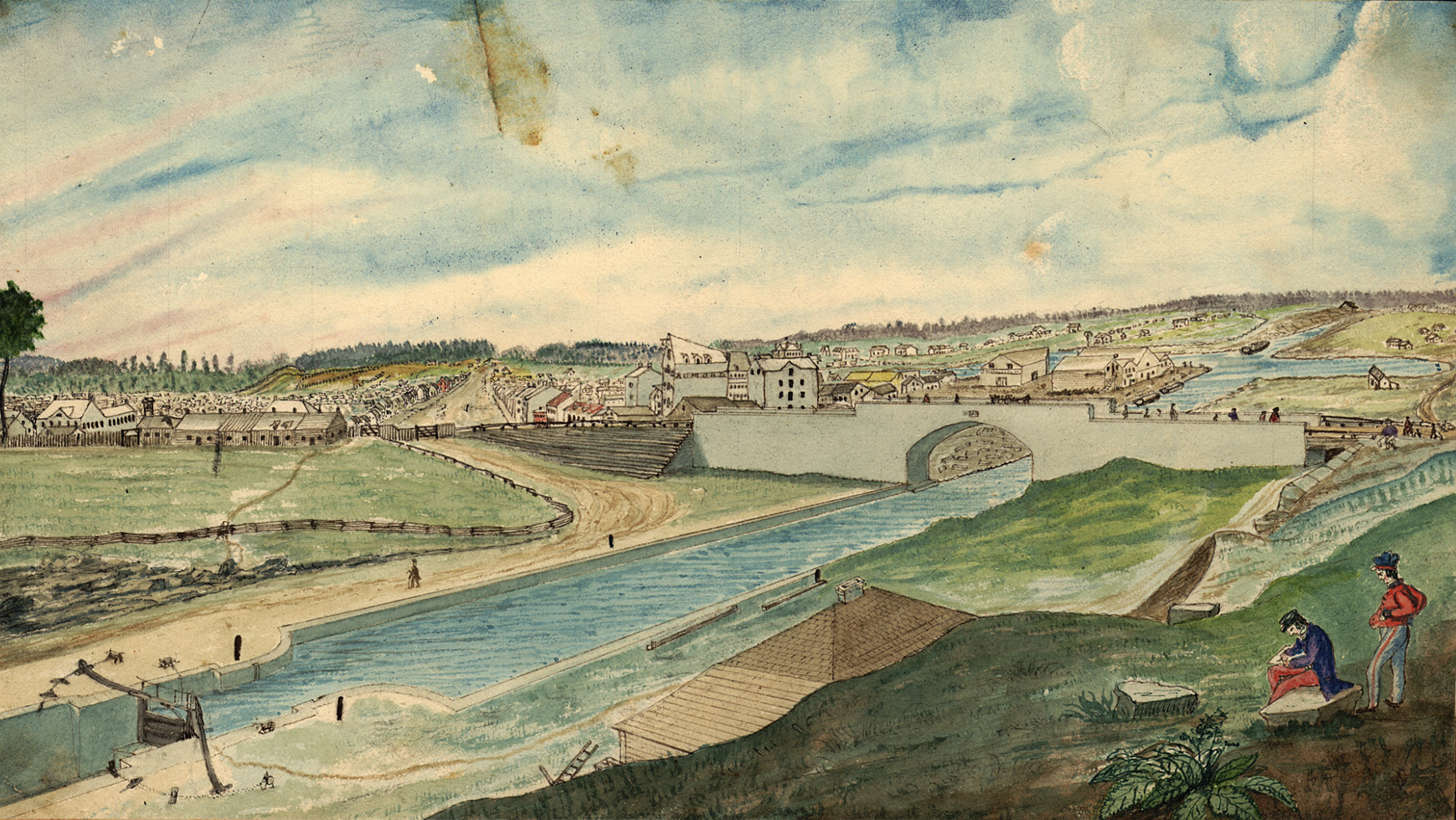
1845 painting of Sappers Bridge the Rideau Canal and Lower Town by Thomas Burrowes

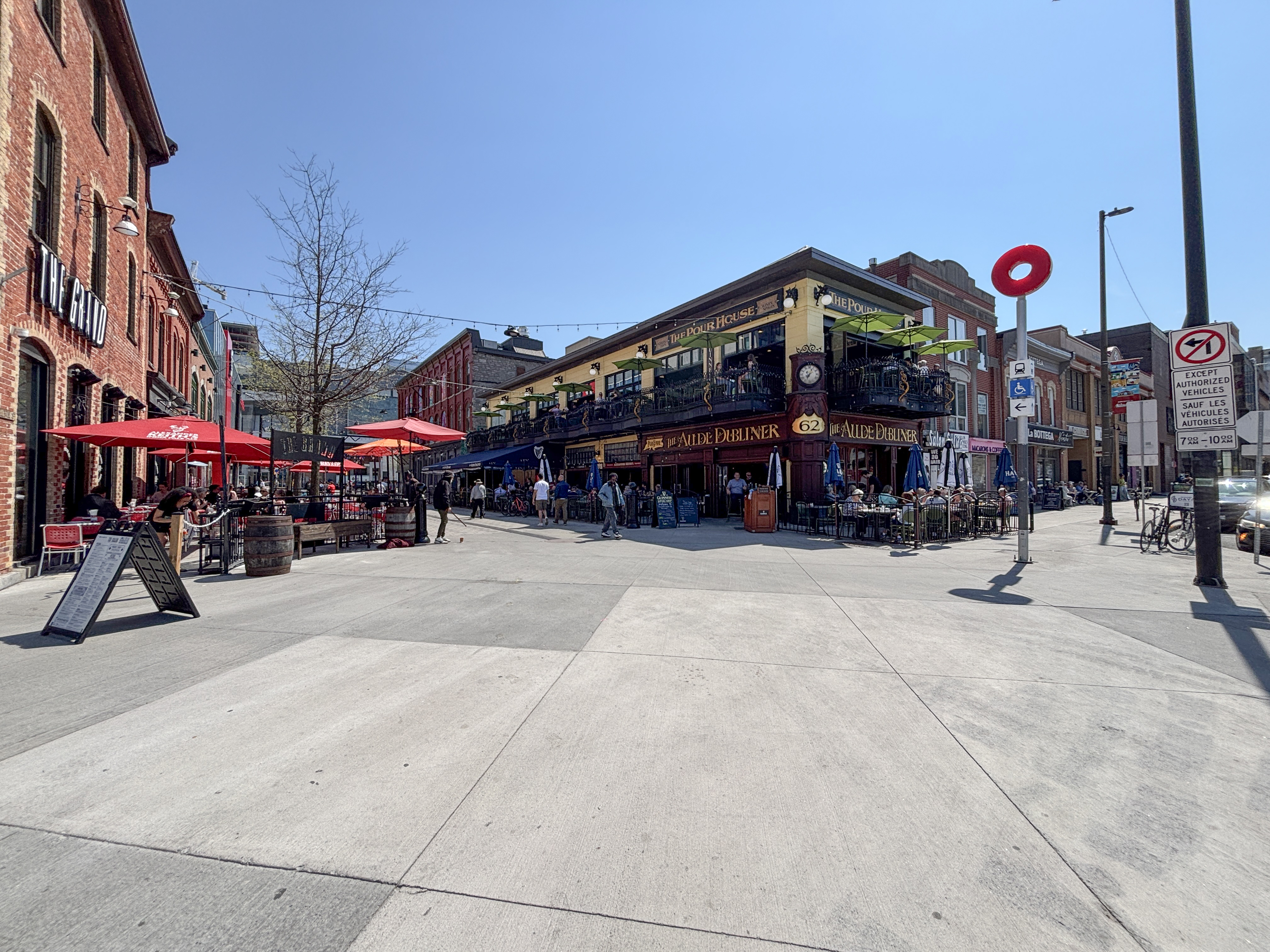
ByWard Market William Street walking area in 2025

Rideau Street has had its share of major development and redevelopment spanning over three decades. Prior to the typical appearance of shopping malls, the characteristic sign of modern suburbanization commonly seen as North American cities increase in size and population, Rideau Street west of King Edward was a popular shopping area of Ottawa. For many years, Rideau Street was one of Ottawa's primary retail thoroughfares, containing department stores such as Freimans, Ogilvy's, Woolworth, Caplan's and Metropolitan. Although the local department stores are gone, Rideau Street still features the Rideau Centre shopping mall, and the street is adjacent to shops of the Byward Market.

The Byward Market, to the north of Rideau Street has consistently thrived throughout ongoing development in surrounding areas. To the south, the Rideau Centre development, a four-level shopping centre, began construction in 1981 continuing through 1982 and upon completion, provided a shopping mall atmosphere upon its official opening on March 16, 1983, as retailers moved inside. As part of the construction, the section of Rideau Street between Sussex Drive & Dalhousie Street was turned into a major bus interchange, which would undergo many major changes in the decades to come, seeing the originally constructed enclosed bus shelters replaced for covered shelters in the 1990s.

Further development began once a 230,000 ft expansion of the Rideau Centre was undertaken by Cadillac Fairview on September 26, 2013. The transit shelters underwent another major change during this time, including their relocation and modernization, as construction of Rideau Station, one of 13 stops announced as part of O-Train Line 1, named the Confederation Line, began in August 2013, as part of Ottawa's existing light-rail system built and operated by OC Transpo. Rideau Street stretches throughout the traditional Lower Town district of Ottawa, of both commercial and residential areas which in the past was predominantly Francophone, but now has one of Ottawa's largest immigrant populations, notably including many Francophone Africans and Somalis. North of Rideau and west of King Edward is typically considered the commercial Byward Market area.

== Embassies ==
- Embassy of the People’s Republic of China
- Embassy of Denmark
- Embassy of Estonia
- Embassy of Japan
- Embassy of the Republic of Korea
- Embassy of the State of Kuwait
- High Commission of Malaysia
- Embassy of the Philippines
- Embassy of Romania
- Embassy of Saudi Arabia
- Embassy of Sweden
- Embassy of Turkey
- Embassy of the United Arab Emirates
- Embassy of the United States

== See also ==
- List of Ottawa neighbourhoods
- Rideau Street
