= Freimann =

Freimann or Freiman may refer to:

== Freimann ==
- Freimann (Munich U-Bahn), an underground railway station in Munich, Germany
- Israel Meir Freimann (1830–1884), Polish-born German rabbi
- Studentenstadt Freimann, a student housing complex in Munich, Germany
- Schwabing-Freimann, a city borough in the borough of Schwabing, Munich, Germany

== Freiman ==
- Freiman Mall, Ottawa, Canada
- Freimans, a defunct department store in Ottawa, Canada
- Alexander Freiman (1879–1968), Polish/Soviet linguist
- Archibald Jacob Freiman (1880–1944), Canadian Zionist
- Louis Freiman (1892–1967), Jewish playwright
- Gregory Freiman (1926–2024), Israeli mathematician
- Lexi Freiman (born c. 1983), Australian author
- Nate Freiman (born 1986), American baseball player
- Freiman's theorem, a combinatorial result in number theory proved by Gregory Freiman

== Freymann ==
- Sergey von Freymann (1882–1946), Russian-Uzbekistani chess player

== See also ==
- Foellinger-Freimann Botanical Conservatory, Fort Wayne, Indiana, U.S.
- Frey (disambiguation)
- Freeman (disambiguation)
