= Freiman Mall =

Shopping arcade in Ottawa, Ontario

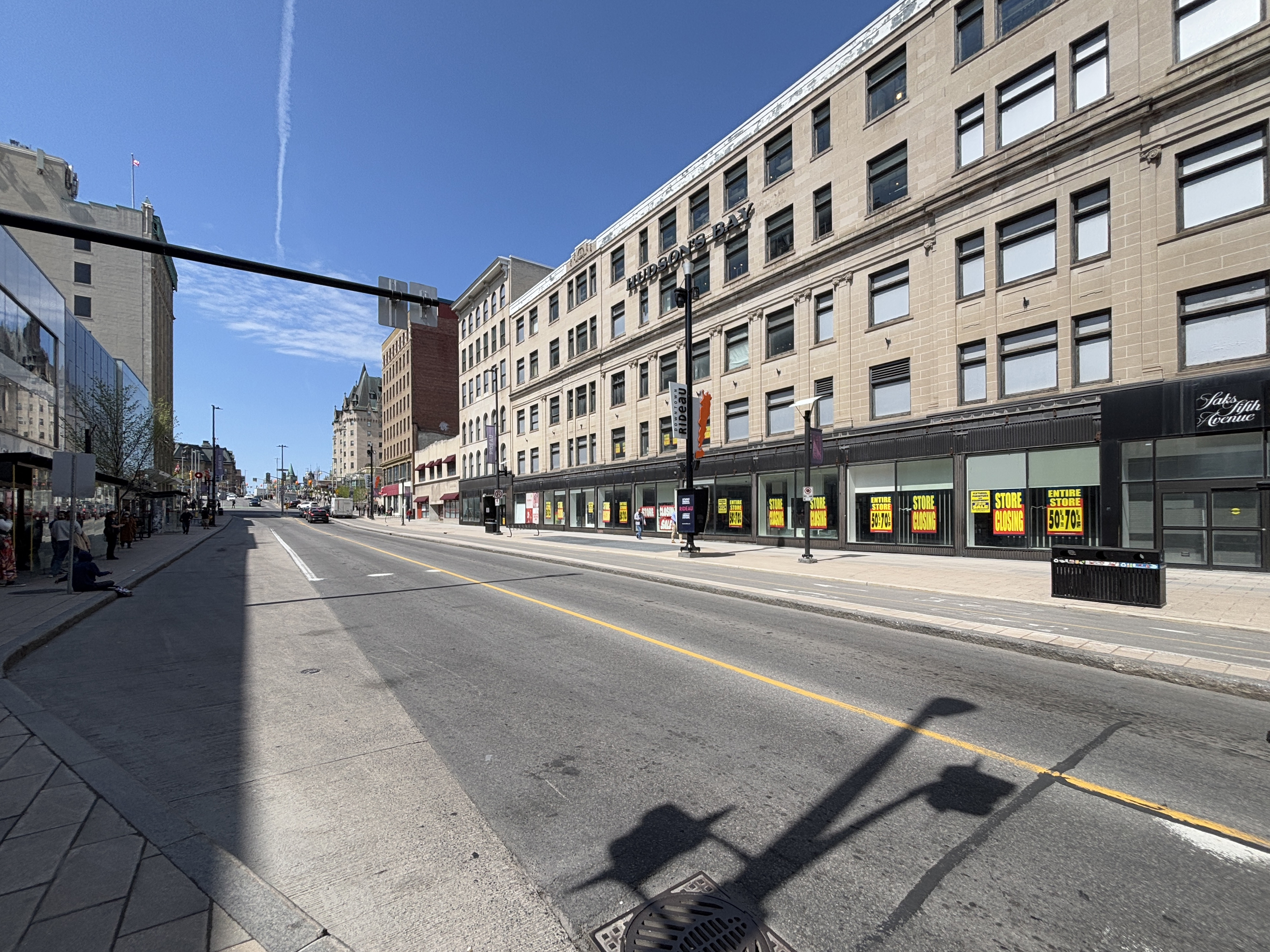
- Freiman Mall exterior view from Rideau Street (2025)
- Coordinates: 45.426°N 75.693°W
- Address: 73 Rideau Street; Ottawa, Ontario; K1N 5W8
- Opened: May 12, 1983
- Developer: Viking Rideau
- Owner: Hudson's Bay Company
- Floors: 1
- Public transit: OC Transpo Rideau, STO

Freiman Mall (French: Mall Freiman) is an enclosed shopping arcade between Rideau and George Streets in Ottawa, Ontario, Canada, east of Sussex Drive and west of William Street. The adjacent Hudson's Bay department store abuts the Freiman Mall on both its north and south sides, and can be accessed from the Freiman Mall interior in downtown Ottawa.

== History ==
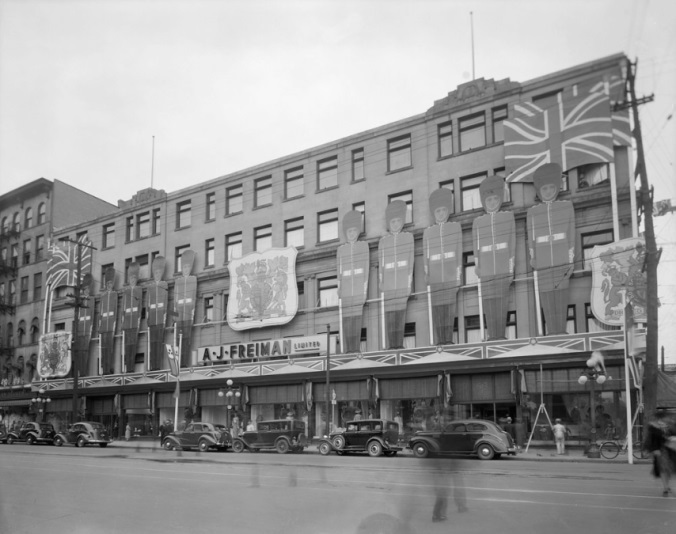
A.J. Freiman on Rideau, 1938

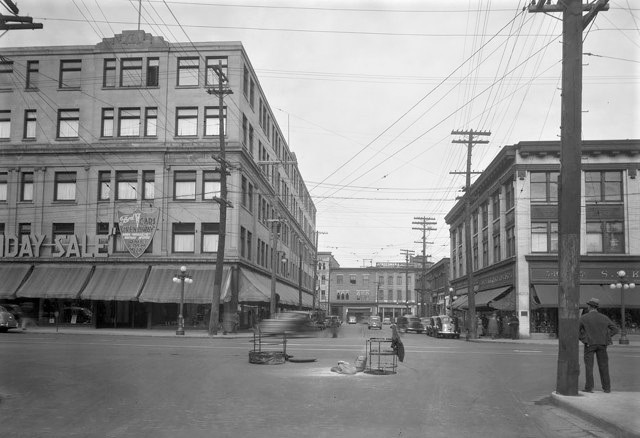
Mosgrove Street, from Rideau, 1938

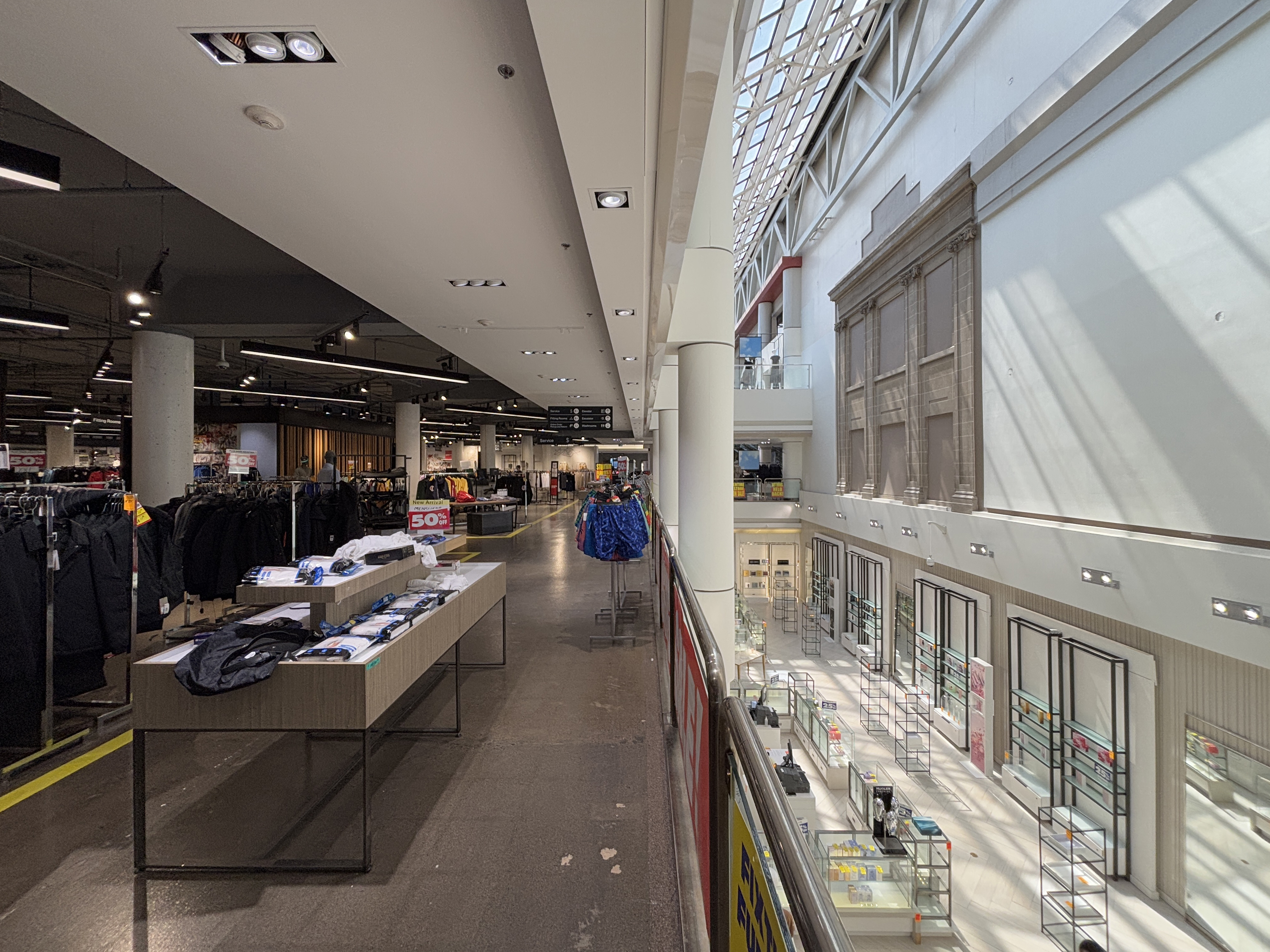
Interior of the mall in 2025

The current location of the Freiman Mall was once a public street called Mosgrove Street, located immediately to the east of the Freimans department store which was adjacent to the ByWard Market and the former Metropolitan department store. The street was later renamed Freiman Street after the department store and its founder, Archibald Jacob Freiman. The Freimans department store was acquired by the Hudson's Bay Company (HBC) in 1972 and rebranded as an outlet of the company's (then) "The Bay" chain.

In conjunction with the development of the Rideau Centre across the street, the City of Ottawa agreed in 1981 to close Freiman Street and to lease the land to the HBC for a term of 99 years in exchange for the construction of an enclosed, public pedestrian passageway connecting Rideau Street to George Street and the ByWard Market, to be open 24 hours per day. Under the terms of the lease, HBC was entitled to install three kiosks related to its store within the new Freiman Mall. The company and the city would share operating and security costs, with the city's share based on the proportion of public (non-retail) floor area and the amount of time the mall would be open past the store's operating hours.

The Freiman Mall was officially opened by Ottawa mayor Marion Dewar on May 12, 1983, at which time a commemorative plaque was unveiled within the mall honouring A. J. Freiman and his family.

In order to reduce the city's share of the operating and security costs, the lease was amended in 1992 to allow HBC to encroach into the Freiman Mall with its merchandise displays, as long as a minimum 6.1-metre (20 ft)-wide public passageway was maintained. So as to reduce security costs, the lease amendment also allowed the company to close the Freiman Mall during a portion of the night.
