= Freimanis =

Family name

Freimanis (feminine: Freimane) is a Latvian surname of German origin (from German surname Freimann). Individuals with the surname include:

- Andrejs Freimanis (1914–1994), Latvian SS officer awarded the Knight's Cross of the Iron Cross
- Eduards Freimanis (1919–1993), Latvian football player
- Mārtiņš Freimanis (1977–2011), Latvian musician
- Rolands Freimanis (born 1988), Latvian basketball player
