= Moses Bilsky =

Canadian Jewish merchant

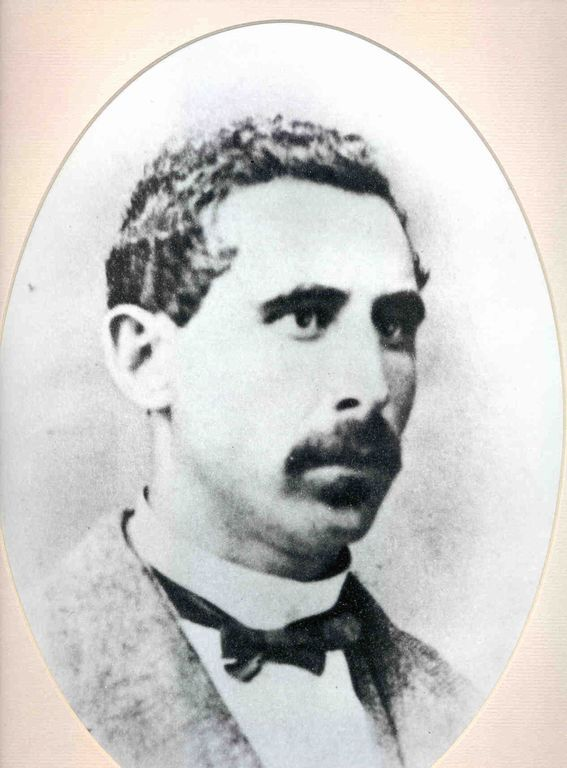
- Born: 10 December 1829; Kovno, Lithuania
- Died: 4 January 1923 (aged 93); Ottawa, Ontario, Canada
- Occupations: Merchant and communal leader

Moses Bilsky (10 December 1829 – 4 January 1923) was a Canadian merchant and Jewish community leader who is believed to be the first Jewish settler in Ottawa, Ontario.

== Life and career ==
Born in Kuvno, Lithuania, Moses was fourteen years old when he, along with his father Ely Bilsky, migrated to Canada in 1845. They first moved to Montreal, before settling in Kemptville, Ontario. Eventually his father decided to move to Palestine to spend his remaining days, leaving his son in the care of relatives living in Brooklyn, New York. In either 1856 or 1857, Moses decided to move back to Canada, and was attracted to the city of Ottawa. He would become the first Jewish settler in the city.

In the 1860s, Moses headed west to make a fortune in the Gold Rush. Eventually he returned to the East Coast, where he met his wife and started a family, and then moved to Ottawa with his family and opened a pawn shop in 1877. He later created a second business, a jewellery store, with his son Alexander in 1901 to form M. Bilsky and Son Limited. Both stores, located on Rideau Street, were successful. When he retired from the business in 1915, his business became known as Bilsky Limited.

== Jewish leadership ==
As Ottawa transformed from a bytown to the capital of Canada, Moses helped establish the Jewish community in the city. He established the first place of worship within his own residence. Once the Adath Jeshurun congregation outgrew his home in 1895, he helped found the first synagogue next to his shop on Murray Street, and later a more extravagant synagogue on King Edward Avenue in 1902.

== Personal ==
After 1876 Bilsky in Ottawa, except when he and his family lived in Mattawa (1882 to 1885) and Montreal (1885 to 1891).

One of his daughters, Lillian Freiman was head of the Canadian branch of the Women's International Zionist Organization and was awarded the Order of the British Empire for her work for war veterans.
