= Murphy-Gamble =

Coordinates: 45.42237°N 75.6982°W

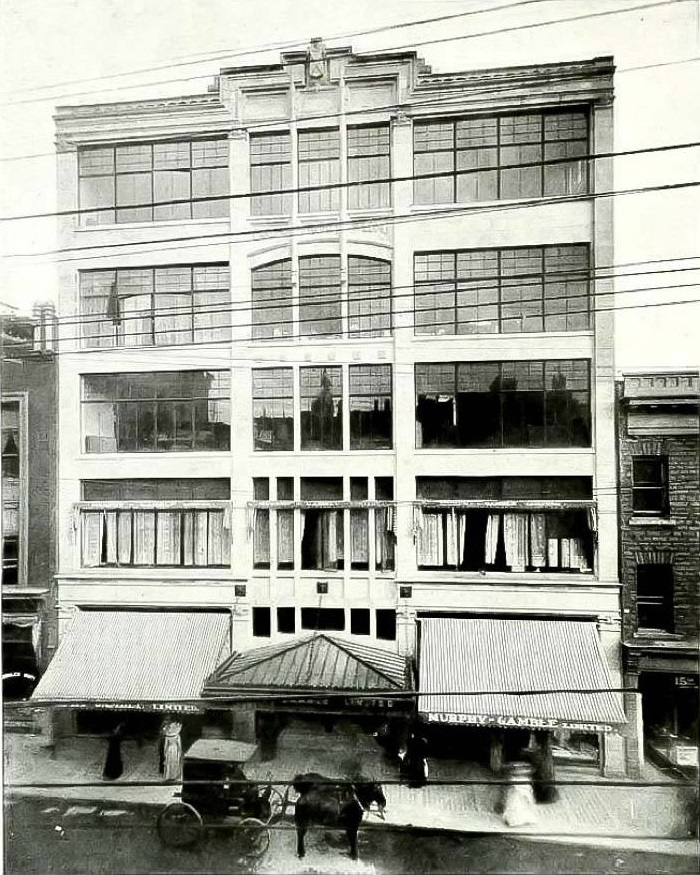
Murphy-Gamble, 118 Sparks Street

Murphy-Gamble Limited was a long-time department store in the City of Ottawa, Ontario, Canada.

The store was located at 118 Sparks Street in a 1909 building designed by C.P. Meredith, and for years used the slogan "Ottawa's Smart Store". Murphy-Gamble's fifth floor restaurant was known as the Rideau Room.

Sparks Street was home to many of Ottawa's department stores during the first half of the 20th century, including Murphy-Gamble, C. Ross and Bryson-Graham. Ogilvy's, Freimans and Caplan's were located further east, on Rideau Street. The success of local department stores in Ottawa discouraged the entry of most national chains into the National Capital Region until the 1950s.

Murphy-Gamble was purchased by Simpson's in 1971, and the store continued to operate under the Simpson's banner until 1983. The building is now occupied by a branch of Scotiabank. With the closing of the Zellers store in 2013, and the closure of Holt Renfrew at 240 Sparks Street in 2014, there were no department stores left in operation on Sparks Street until Winners moved into the previous Zellers location in 2015.

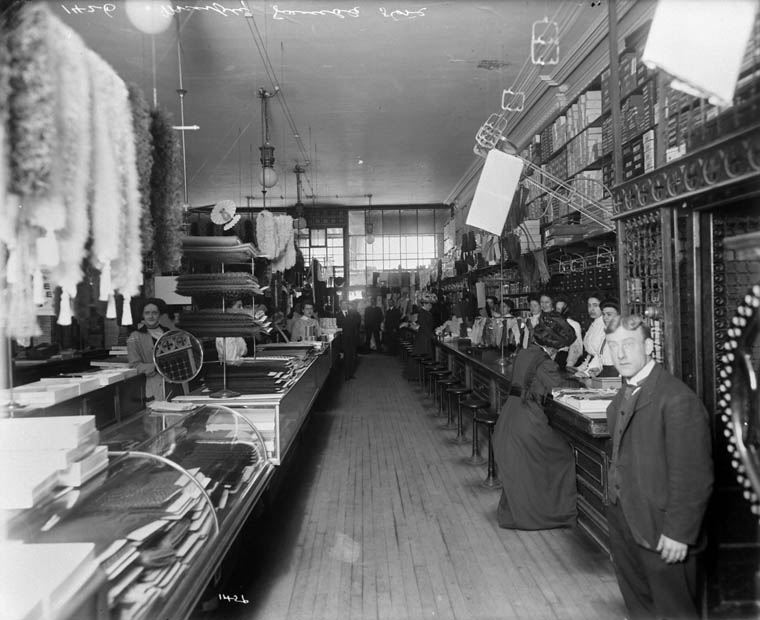
Inside of store

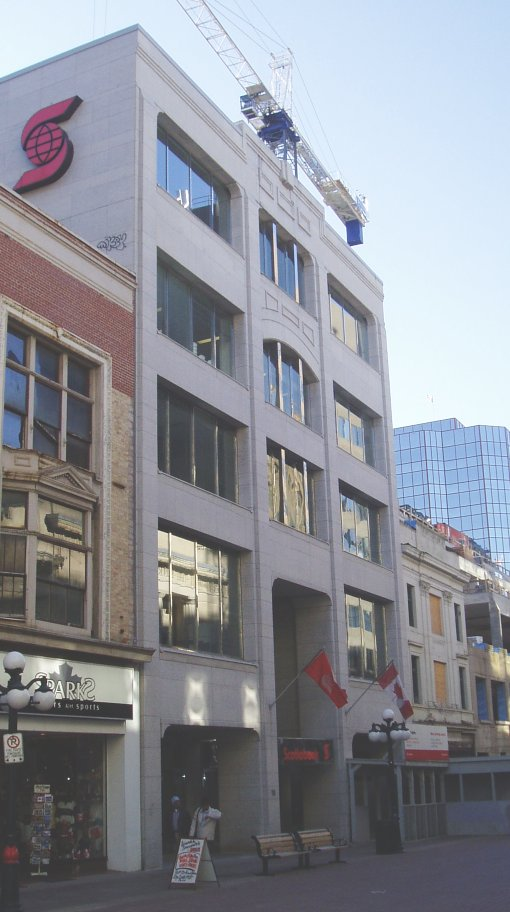
Today

== See also ==
- List of Canadian department stores
