= St. Laurent Shopping Centre =

Coordinates: 45.422°N 75.639°W

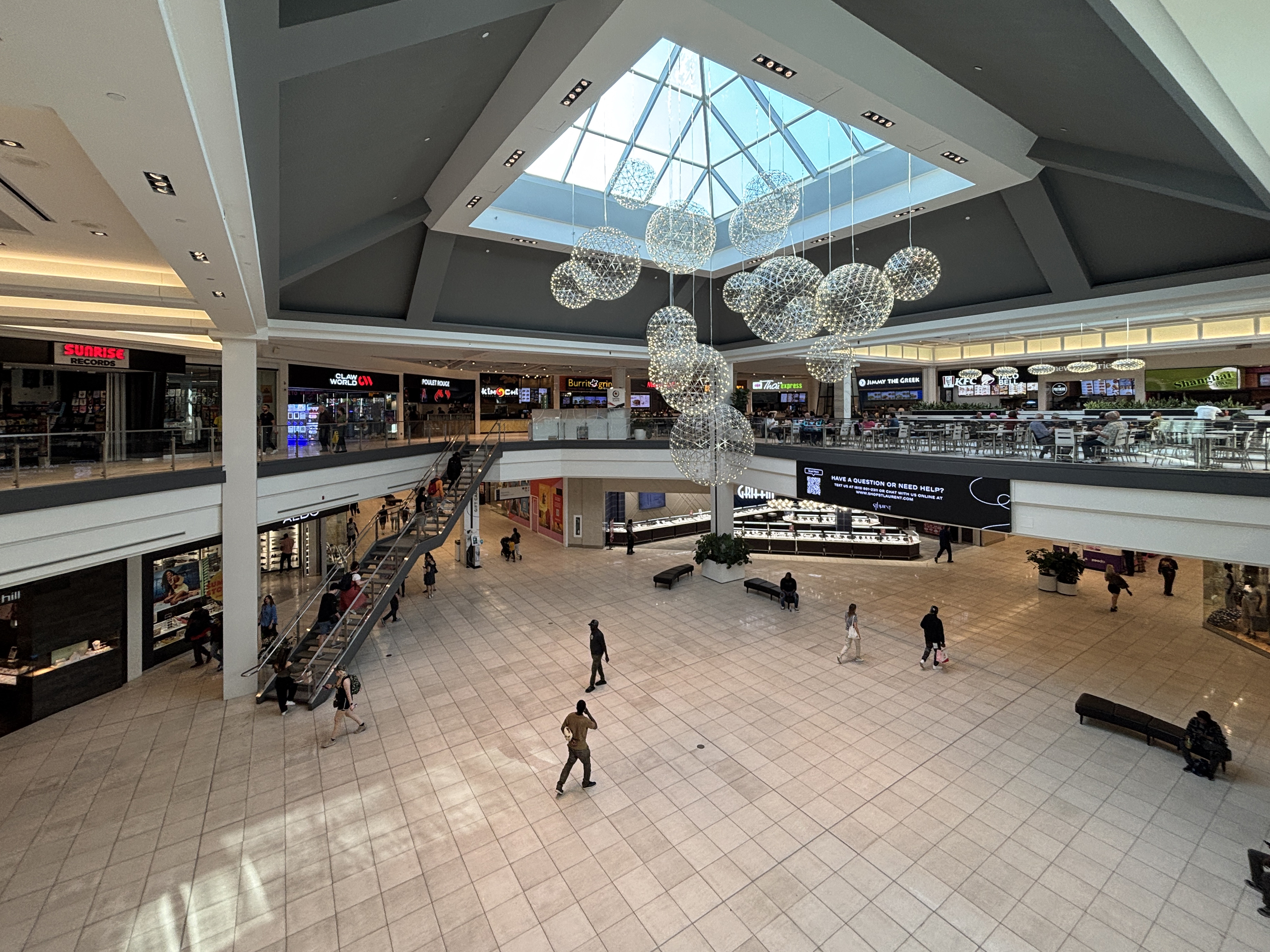
- The mall's Atrium in 2025
- Address: 1200 St. Laurent Boulevard; Ottawa, Ontario, Canada; K1K 3B8
- Opened: October 4, 1967
- Owner: Morguard REIT
- Num. of stores: 195
- Num. of anchor tenants: 2
- Floor area: 90,200 square metres (971,000 sq ft)
- Floors: 3
- Parking: over 4600 spaces
- Public transit: St-Laurent
- Website: Official website

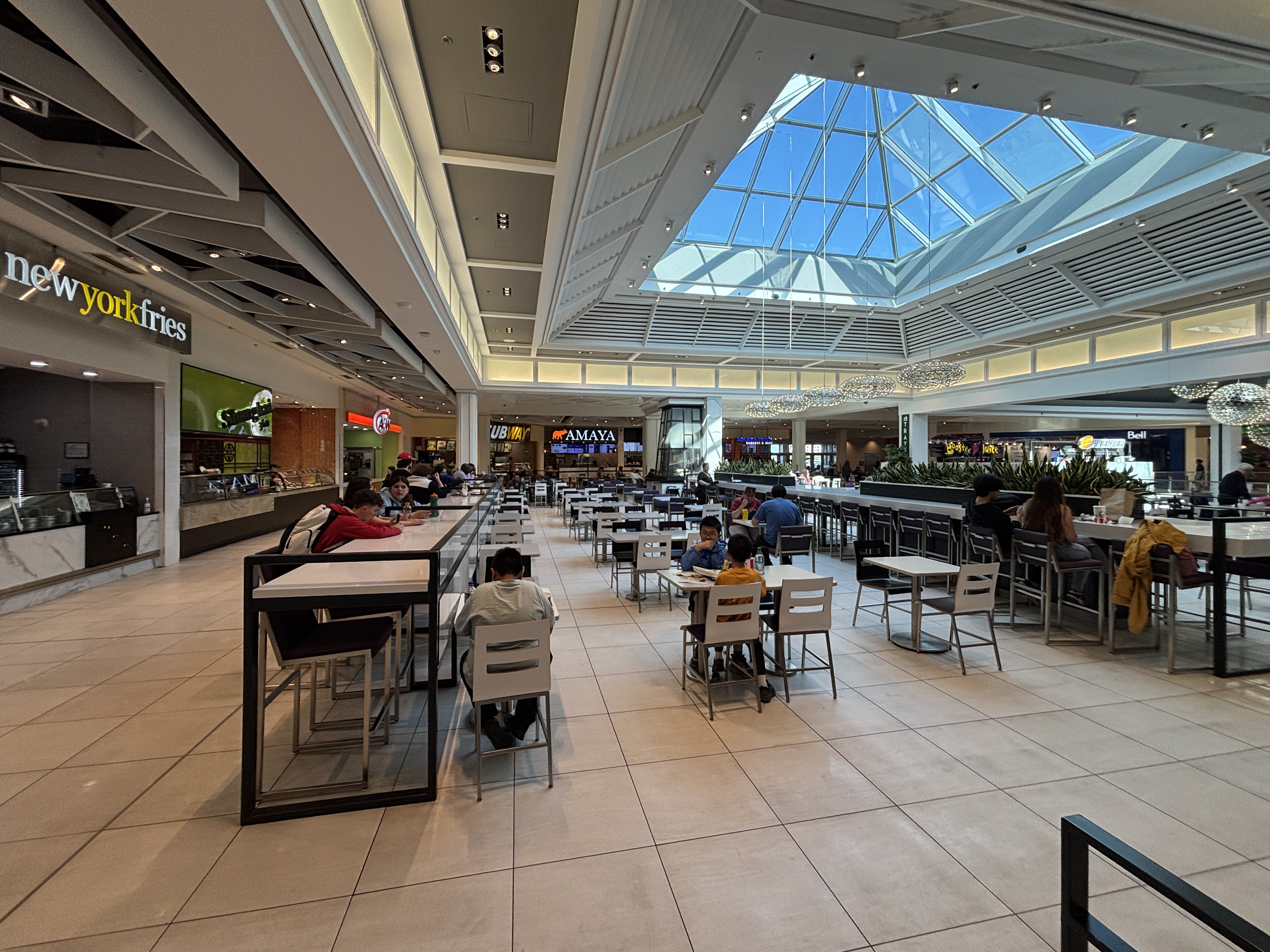
Food Court

The St. Laurent Shopping Centre (French: Centre St-Laurent) is a shopping mall located in Ottawa, Ontario, Canada. It is owned and operated by Morguard REIT. The shopping mall is located just north of Highway 417 at the corner of St. Laurent Boulevard and Coventry Road.

The mall opened in October 1967 housing 50 retailers with Simpson-Sears (later Sears), Freimans and Dominion as original anchors. Sears was the last original anchor to leave the mall, closing on January 8, 2018 due to bankruptcy of the chain. Hudson's Bay was the mall's oldest anchor tenant, having purchased Freimans in December 1971 and rebranding the store to The Bay in June 1973. On March 13, 1991, The Bay moved to a two-level location as part of a mall expansion. It is adjacent to the former space of The Bay and 50% larger. The former store was converted to a food court, office space, and other retailers. The mall was also formerly anchored by Toys "R" Us.

St. Laurent Centre is the third largest mall in terms of total space in the National Capital Region behind Rideau Centre and Bayshore Shopping Centre with 880,736 sq ft of leasable area, although a large portion of the mall's gross leasable area is utilized by non-retail tenants. It is currently the 27th largest mall in Canada. The mall's owner, Morguard, has applied to the City of Ottawa for land-use planning approvals to permit an expansion of the mall, bringing the overall size to 121,000 square metres (1,300,000 sq ft). If approved, the expansion would make St. Laurent Centre the 10th largest mall in Canada. The expansion plan is currently on hold indefinitely.

The mall has a total of 195 stores and services on three levels. The centre also hosts a large amount of non-retail tenants including office space, a dental clinic, a gym (GoodLife Fitness), a second-run theatre and a career college (Willis College).

OC Transpo's St-Laurent station is connected to the mall, and is served by O-Train Line 1, OC Transpo buses, and intercity service by Megabus and Rider Express.

On the afternoon of September 16, 2022, there was a physical altercation involving multiple people in their late teens and early 20s. The event took place just outside the mall's Dollarama. Marcus Maloney (19) was stabbed, and later pronounced deceased in hospital. Mohammed Osman (18) was later charged with second degree murder, along with two counts of aggravated assault and one count of breaching release conditions after being apprehended by Ottawa Police overnight.
