= Lillian Bilsky Freiman =

Canadian activist (1885–1940)

Lillian Bilsky Freiman OBE (1885 – November 2, 1940), nicknamed The Poppy Lady, was a Jewish-Canadian philanthropist, and Zionist. In 2008, she was designated a Person of National Historic Significance by the Canadian Government for being "a gifted organizer and philanthropist who worked to improve the health and welfare of her fellow citizens."

== Early life ==
In 1885, Lillian Freiman was born at Mattawa, Ontario to Pauline Reich, a homemaker, and Moses Bilsky, who was a Jewish-Canadian merchant and community leader, thought to have been the first Jewish settler in Ottawa. Her family was of Russian-Lithuanian descent.

She was the fifth of eleven children. Her sister Lucy would go on to marry Allan Bronfman, one of the founders of Joseph E. Seagram & Sons, the liquor distiller and marketer.

== Career ==
=== World War I ===
She should be better recognized because there’s so much commemoration about the First World War and she contributed so much towards the effort to help the soldiers

— Hagit Hadaya, historian

When the Great War broke out, Freiman set up 30 sewing machines in her home and organized Red Cross sewing circles to send blankets and clothing to the soldiers overseas. This sewing circle would become a Disraeli Chapter of the Daughters of the Empire. In addition, she co-founded The Great War Veterans Association, which would become the Royal Canadian Legion. The Association, by 1919, became the largest veterans' organization in Canada. Later, she was the first woman to become an honorary life member of the Royal Canadian Legion.

In 1919, the Vetcraft Shops, which employed returning servicemen to make furniture and toys, was created with Freiman's influence. When John McCrae's poem In Flanders Fields became famous, many campaigns were introduced to have the poppy adopted as a symbol of remembrance and a means of raising funds for veterans. In 1921, Freiman crafted the first Canadian poppies in her living room. In 1923, the Vetcraft Shops took over the poppy making. She was a member of the National Poppy Advisory Committee and chaired Ottawa’s annual poppy campaign nearly every year until her death.

=== Post-war activities ===
In 1918, she was summoned by the mayor of Ottawa to organize a 1500-volunteer relief effort. The project gained national attention. With media support, she launched a campaign disseminating not only progress reports but also information designed to help prevent the spread of the influenza.

In 1921, she assisted between 146 and 151 Jewish war orphans from Ukraine to emigrate to Canada. Among them was a 12-year-old orphan named Gladys Rozovsky was adopted by Freiman and her husband.

Freiman was the founder of the Canadian Hadassah - a woman's Zionist Organization. She accomplished this by raising money for the Helping Hand Fund of Hadassah, by traveling acrossing Canada, and securing about $200,000 from 120,000 Jews, most of them recent immigrants. She would head the organization for twenty-one years, from 1919-1940. By 1925, under her leadership, membership of the Hadassah was at 4,500 women in 68 chapters. Beyond this, she had been involved with leadership roles in the Ottawa Welfare Bureau, the Protestant Infants Home, the Canadian Institute for the Blind, the Red Cross Society, the Amputations Association of Great War Veterans of Canada, the Salvation Army, the Big Sisters’ Association, the YMCA, the Joan of Arc Society. She was also involved with the Girl Guides Association, the Ladies Hebrew Benevolent Association, the Ladies Auxiliary of Adath Jeshurun Congregation and the Ladies Auxiliary of B'nai B'rith.

In 1934, she chaired the United Palestine Appeal.

== Awards and accolades ==
In 1934, she was awarded the Order of the British Empire, becoming the first Jewish Canadian to receive the honour. The award was presented to her by King George V on New Year’s Day.

The Bytown Museum hosted an exhibit on Freiman’s life.

In 1924, delegates at the Canadian National Convention named a school after her.

In 1930, the publication Women of Canada dubbed Freiman as "Mother of the Jewish People of Canada".

In 1935, Canadian Hadassah dedicated the year to Freiman as tribute to her fiftieth birthday.

== Personal life ==
In 1903, she married prominent businessman A. J. Freiman, who owned the major department store "Freiman’s Department Store" on Rideau Street. It was one of only two Jewish department stores in Canada. The couple had three children, Dorothy (Alexandor, 1906–1986), Lawrence (1909–1986), and Queene Esther (Luxenberg, 1912–1997), and one adopted daughter.

== Death ==
On November 2, 1940, she died aged 55, due to failing health. Her funeral was attended by Prime Minister William Lyon Mackenzie King, Ottawa Mayor Stanley Lewis, and a Royal Canadian Legion honour guard.

In 1957, her Victorian-style mansion on 149 Somerset Street West in Ottawa was converted to the home of the Ottawa Army Officer's Mess.

On December 29, 1941, a tablet was unveiled by Major-General L.F. LaFleche, Associate Deputy Minister of National War Services at Trafalgar House that was inscribed:

In loving memory and to the honour of Mrs. A.J. (Lillian) Freiman, OBE, national officer and general convener in Ottawa of Canadian Legion Poppy Day. The friend of all soldiers and dependents who, in public and in private gave generous, warmhearted and always effectual service and assistance in their cause from the days of 1914-18 to the day of her passing November 2nd, 1940.

== See also ==
- Persons of National Historic Significance
- Moina Michael

== Works on Lillian Freiman ==
- Figler, Bernard. Lillian and Archie Freiman: biographies Montreal, 1961. Print
- Freiman at Jewish Women's Archive JWA
- Merna Forster 100 More Canadian Heroines: Famous and Forgotten Faces. Dundurn, 2012, google books pp 154 squ
