= Archibald Jacob Freiman =

- Aharon Yaakov Freiman
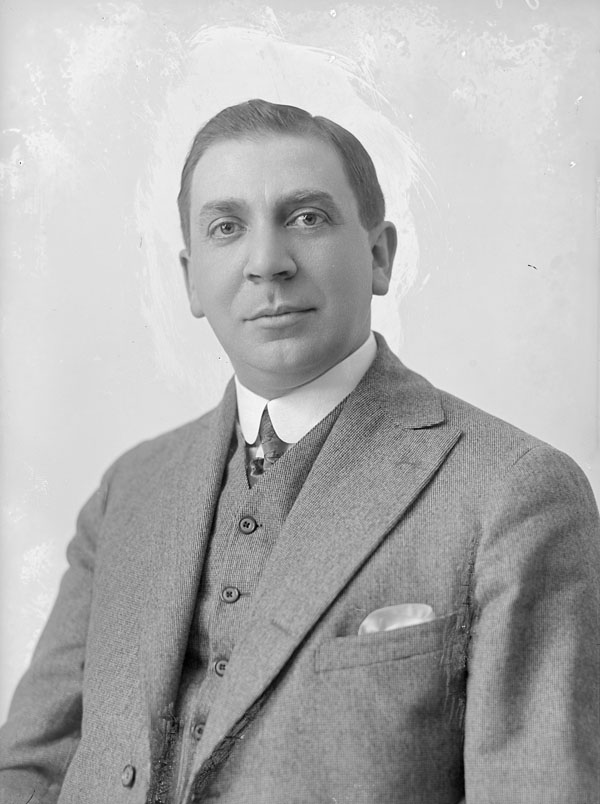
- Freiman in 1914

2nd President of the Zionist Organization of Canada
- In office 1921–1944
- Preceded by: Clarence De Sola
- Succeeded by: S.J. Zacks

Personal details
- Born: June 6, 1880 Virbalis, Lithuania
- Died: June 4, 1944 (aged 63) Ottawa, Ontario, Canada
- Citizenship: Canadian
- Spouse: Lillian Freiman
- Occupation: Businessman

Archibald Jacob "Archie" Freiman (June 6, 1880 – June 4, 1944) was a Lithuania-born Jewish Ottawa businessman and Zionist leader. According to Bernard Figler, Freiman was the most influential Canadian Jew of his generation. His wife was noted Zionist Lillian Freiman.

== Early life ==
Aharon Yaakov Freiman was born on June 6, 1880, the fourth child and first son of Lithuanian Jewish parents, Hersh and Hanna Freiman. In 1893 the Freimans left Virbalis, Lithuania for Canada and settled in Hamilton, Ontario. Modifying their names to fit Canadian norms, Hersh became Harris Freiman while Aharon Yaacov became Archibald Jacob Freiman, popularly known as "Archie."

Archie Freiman performed well in elementary and high school and was admitted to the Hamilton Business College. Harris Freiman had wanted his son to become a doctor, but Archie convinced him that a business career was a legitimate Canadian route to achievement and success.

== Business ==
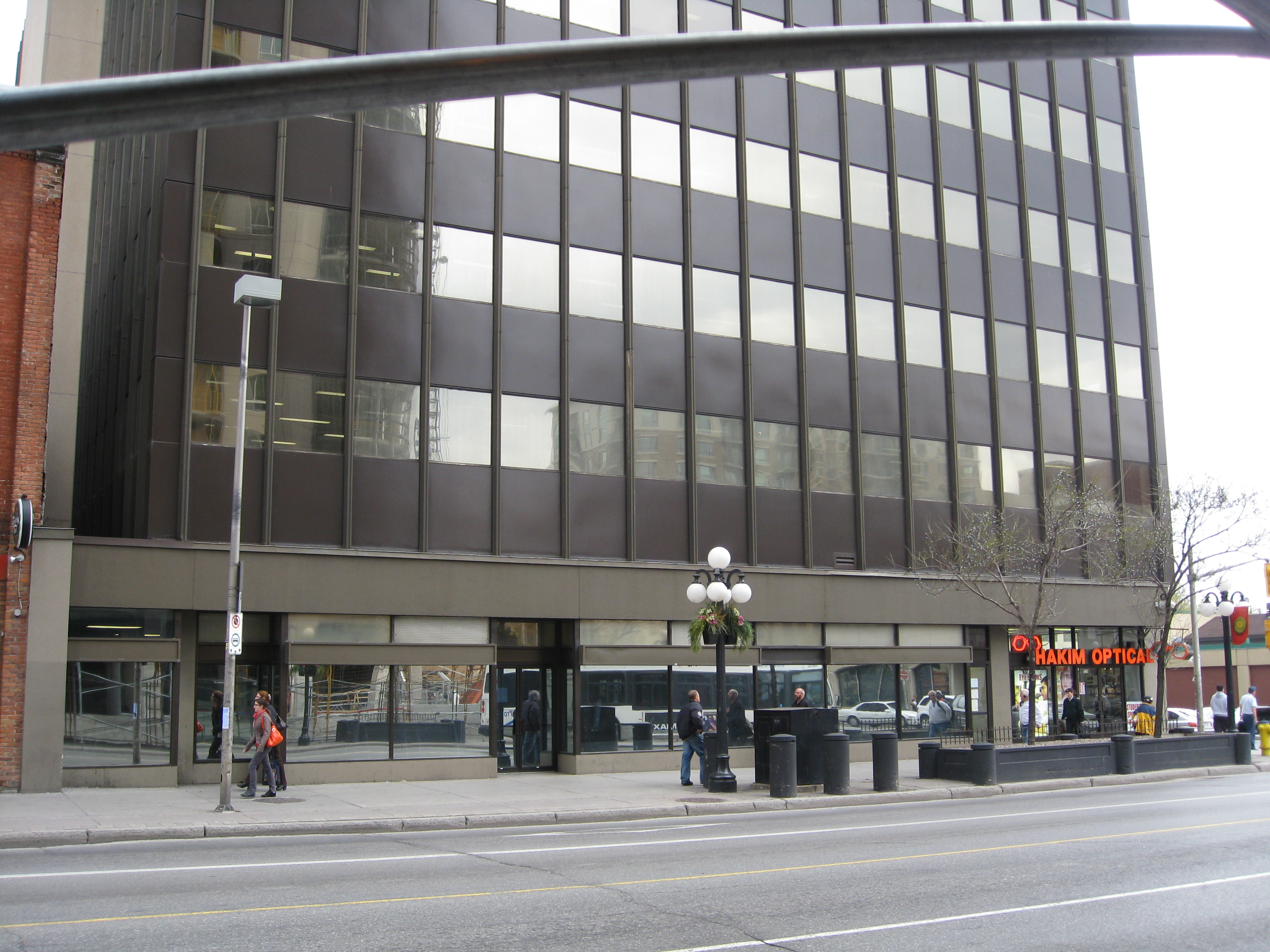
221–223 Rideau Street, former location of The Canada House Furnishing Company.

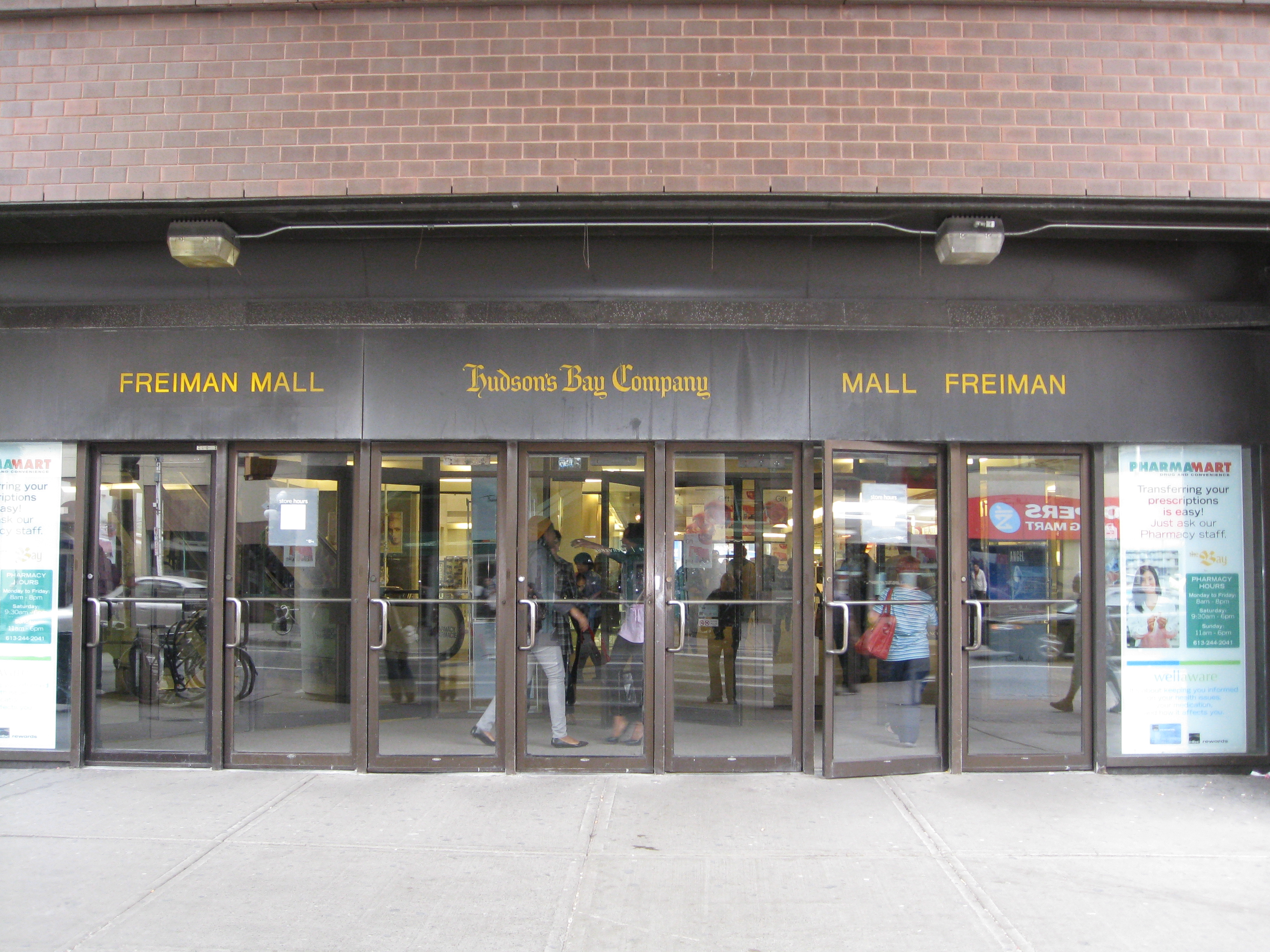
The entrance to the Freiman Mall arcade at 73 Rideau Street, located adjacent to the former location of H. Freiman & Son. The Freiman Mall is an indoor arcade that links Rideau Street to the Byward Market and replaced the former outdoor Mosgrove Street

In 1899, at the age of 19, Archie Freiman became the junior business partner of Moses Cramer. Together they opened the Canada House Furnishing Company on 223 Rideau Street in Ottawa. The store sold carpets and oil cloths, among other household furnishings. In 1900 the store was expanded to two more addresses, 221 and 222 Rideau Street. In 1902 the business was moved to 73 Rideau Street.

Archie Freiman's business methods were speculative and included signing for a year's worth of advertisement space with the Ottawa Citizen, a local newspaper, much to his partner's chagrin. When Archie suggested that a credit department be opened and installment sales offered, Cramer balked and dissolved their partnership. Harris Freiman, Archie's father, stepped in as senior new partner and the Canada House Furnishing Company was renamed H. Freiman & Son.

Having become more confident in his business acumen and backed by his new partner, Archie signed a year-long advertising contract worth fifty-dollars. In 1908, H. Freiman & Son was enlarged to the addresses of 67 to 73 Rideau Street. In 1917 83 Rideau Street was also acquired. In that same year Archie bought his father's share in the business, and having become sole owner decided to turn the business into a department store. After adding separate departments for men and women in 1918, the store was renamed The Archibald J. Freiman Department Store, and the overall company A.J. Freiman Limited in 1923.

== Charity and Philanthropy ==
Business success was never Freiman's ultimate goal in life. Rather, taking the Talmudic precept to 'separate not thyself from the community' he had learned in Hebrew School to heart, Freiman spent a considerable amount of time, energy and money on charitable and philanthropic causes.

The first cause to which Freiman contributed was the building of the Adath Jeshurun Synagogue on King Edward Avenue in downtown Ottawa around the turn of the 20th century. In 1903 he was elected President of the Congregation, maintaining the office for the following twenty-six years. He was similarly President of the Ottawa Jewish Community.

Helping the sick, Freiman supported the Ottawa Protestant Hospital, the Protestant Home for the Aged, and the Perley Home for Incurables. He aided the poor through his support of the Salvation Army, the Jean D'Arc Institute, various Jewish charities and the Ottawa Council of Social Agendas. Freiman contributed to Canadian economic life as part of the Ottawa Civic Foundation, the Board of Trade, the Retail Merchants Association of Canada and the Central Canada Exhibition.

Doing his part as a member of the British Empire, Freiman organized the 1927 celebration of Canada's Diamond Jubilee of Confederation. In war, he also lent his support: during the First World War Freiman offered his services to the government and became part of the Victory Loan Committee and was a vice-president of the Associated War Relief Societies of Canada. In the Second World War he was part of the National War Finance Committee.

Freiman also worked to help fellow Jews in Europe who had been affected by the world wars, directing the American Jewish Joint Distribution Committee which logistically provided for displaced Jews during and after the First World War. During the Second World War he chaired the United Jewish Refugee Committee of Ottawa and ran yearly fund-raising campaigns.

== Zionism ==
=== Beginning ===
Archie Freiman had a long and distinguished leadership role in Canadian Zionism, beginning when he was twenty-one years old. In December 1901, Freiman attended the Second Convention of the Federation of Zionist Societies, in Montreal, as an official delegate representing the Kingston Jewish Community. There he was elected member of the Zionist National Council.

In 1906, Freiman succeeded Samuel Bilsky as President of the Herzl Club and attended the Fifth Convention of the Federation of Zionist Societies, held in Toronto. By the end of 1906 he was chairman of the Ottawa Zionist Society.

Freiman attended the Tenth Zionist Convention in Montreal in 1909 and moved a resolution favouring the purchase of land in Palestine, having been appointed to study the proposal beforehand with others. In 1912, Freiman was chairman of the Twelfth Zionist Convention, held in Ottawa, and was there elected a vice-president of the Federation of Zionist Societies.

=== First World War ===
As the damage wrought upon European Jews became known, the idea of creating a Canadian Jewish Alliance became popular. In September 1915 Freiman moved a resolution "that the Federation of Zionist Societies shall call a conference of Canadian Jewry to decide what stand to take with regard to the proposed Jewish Congress to be held in the United States and that every Canadian Jewish organization be invited to the Conference." The resolution passed, and the conference, the first great gathering of Canadian Jewry, was held on November 14, 1915, with Freiman as a vice-chairman. During the conference Freiman and Louis Fitch moved a resolution, unanimously approved, that called for Jewish rights to be upheld in Palestine and Jews allowed to develop the land "without hindrance."

=== Inter-War Years ===
At the Sixteenth Zionist Convention in early January 1919, Clarence De Sola, then president of the Federation of Zionist Societies of Canada, retired. A provisional committee was formed to elect his successor, chaired by Freiman.

In December 1919 Freiman was elected Dominion Executive President of the Million Dollar Relief Campaign, an organization which helped Jews in Eastern Europe. In his very first year as President Freiman tripled the organization's fund-raising, reaching $214 000.

On April 20, 1920, word reached Canada that Britain had received the Mandate for Palestine with the "express obligation of carrying out the Balfour Declaration." Freiman said:

No longer are we a race without a country; no longer can we be regarded as wanderers on the face of the Earth. We are now a nation with a national home; that goal towards which our hearts have always yearned has been reached, and we Jews of this generation ought to count ourselves doubly blessed that we have lived to see this great day. World Jewry of to-day can be truly likened to a much-buffeted and battered ship that has weathered the storm of ages, of suffering and anxious hope, and now sails into the calm, placid waters of the home port.

In May 1920 Freiman and five others were appointed by the Zionist Council to attend the Zionist Conference in London. In October he was part of a group of Canadian Jews who sent a cable to British Prime Minister Lloyd George, calling for Palestine's northern boundaries to be fixed and the Balfour Declaration made part of the Mandate for Palestine.

At the Seventeenth Zionist Convention the provisional committee formed at the previous convention came to its conclusion and Freiman was chosen as the organization's new president.

Freiman's first great challenge as president was in responding to the White Paper, a British government declaration that reduced the proposed size of the Jewish state by two-thirds through the removal of Transjordan. Freiman chose to continue to be optimistic, focusing on the positive of any return to Palestine over the negative of the restrictive White Paper. In his 1922 New Year's message, Freiman said:

Today we have that very opportunity our fathers and forefathers prayed for, for nigh 2,000 years. Whereas they lived with the hope of return to our Homeland as a mirage, an ideal, we live with the return as a fact to be accomplished – if we only will it. Consider then what a magnificent privilege is ours today. O, how I wish that every Jew and Jewess would think in this way!

Freiman continued in his optimism at the Nineteenth Zionist Convention in January 1924, and targeted Israel Zangwill for his pessimism. Freiman also made clear that there were not enough donations, and outlined a plan of spending that would focus on land buying in Palestine. The donations were to always be a difficulty. The fund-raising Keren Hayesod Campaign, which Freiman founded in September 1924, estimated in 1920 that twenty-five million pounds sterling could be raised by 1925, a goal that was not even half reached by 1945. Freiman had to deal with Canadian Jews, well established in Canada, who were uninterested in emigrating to Palestine and swung from extreme optimism and pessimism with respect to the future of Zionism. It was this fund-raising role that Canadian Jews had also been called upon to provide as their contribution to world Zionism, and it was to Freiman to organize it.

Freiman's spirits were raised when in 1927 he first visited Palestine, at the age of 47. Discussing his experience at the Keren Hayesod campaigned dinner in March 1927, he said that:

Nowhere in the world have I seen that spirit, the pride of being a Jew, as in Palestine.

Preceding the Twenty-First Zionist Convention in Winnipeg Freiman's optimism and Presidency was put to its sternest test. In Ottawa was Mendel Ussishkin, President of the Jewish National Fund in Jerusalem. He offered a challenging proposition to Freiman, the redemption of Emek Hepher, Biblically known as the Plain of Sharon. It would cost $1,000,000 to buy at $100,000 a year, with an immediate payment of $300,000. Canadian Jews, however, had only contributed $25,000 a year towards the Jewish National Fund in the previous years. Freiman contemplated the challenge for two weeks while Ussishkin was a guest at his house in Ottawa. H.M. Caiserman was a guest for a week at the Freiman house and recounted later that:

In the summer of 1927, I spent a week in the summer home of the Freimans. Immortal Ussishkin was there too, with the proposal for Canadian Jewry to purchase Emek Hepher. Freiman doubted whether Canadian Jewry were prepared for such a great undertaking.

Freiman considered resigning instead of bringing the proposal to the convention. After further thought he brought the discussion to the Zionist Council, where it was successfully passed. At the Twenty-First Zionist Convention, taking place the following week, the proposal was brought forward after a speech by Ussishkin, who elaborated on the Jewish history of the region to be purchased. The proposal was unanimously passed. In the excitement that immediately followed conventioneers called out their donations to the cause: A. A. Levin alone promised $25,000. As Ussishkin spread word to the Fifteenth Zionist Congress in Basle, Switzerland, congratulatory messages were sent by such figures as Nahum Sokolow, Leo Motzkin, the Congress Presidium and Dr. Chaim Weizmann. The Jewish National Fund inscribed the name of the Canadian Zionist Organization into its fourth Jubilee volume of the Golden Book. In 1932 the bank loan that was required to finance the original $300,000 payment had been paid back.

Freiman's next challenge arrived in 1930 when a British Royal Commission of Inquiry formed to investigate violent Arab riots in Palestine concluded that Jewish immigration and development was the cause. A White Paper was thereafter published which limited Jewish immigration. Freiman responded with optimism and suggested that better efforts be made to share Jewish perspectives with the British, as he was convinced they had an "inherent sense of justice and fair play" and lack of information was the cause of their conclusions. Freiman said:

It is true that our task is similar to that of our ancestors in the days of Pharaoh, when told to make bricks without straw being given to them, for we are told to build a National Home without immigration or the right to acquire land. But even such seemingly insurmountable difficulties we will overcome. The Jewish will has never faltered and so with our perseverance and the help of God we will yet attain our goal.

=== Nazism and the Second World War ===
Freiman also supported Zionism through his own personal battles with anti-Semitism. In the 1930s, Canadian Nazi and anti-Semitic groups began to increase their preaching of discrimination and boycott of Jewish businesses. Jewish leaders were unable to curtail their efforts, and when in Montreal a Jewish merchant sued an anti-Semitic publication for "personal hurt and pecuniary loss through the libel of Jews as a people" the judge ruled that so long as a Jew was not singled out by name then no law was broken. It was in this climate that in 1935 Freiman was the target of an anti-Semitic publication, written by Jean Tissot, a detective of the Ottawa Police Department. Freiman sued Tissot for libel and won.

In September 1938, responding to the treatment of Jews in Germany, Freiman wrote that:

In this battle between the forces for good and evil, we who have in the past provided the world with a rallying cry must do so again. We were nurtured on the prophetic teachings of social justice, and we gave these to mankind for its own salvation. The issue to-day is clearcut; either the discordant cacophony of the devil's music or the clear God-like voice of freedom must prevail.

In April 1939, Freiman explained his response to Nazi treatment of Jews, with the statement that "The only solution to Jewish suffering is Zionism. Zionism is our Messiah."

In September 1939 word reached Ottawa that Germany had invaded Poland. Freiman, upon hearing the news, had a heart attack. After recovering he gave his thoughts, condemning the Nazis as barbaric and oppressive, destroyers of civilization, and pledging his support and that of Canadian Jews to the democracies.

A few years later, in 1941, Freiman shared an optimistic view on the implications of the war for Judaism, stating that as the Balfour Declaration was a result of the First World War so the new war would "reinstate us in our human value and rehabilitate us as individuals and as a people."

By 1943 Canada and the world had learned of the Nazi extermination of the Jews in Europe, and Britain had responded by allowing 30,000 Jewish immigrants into Palestine. Freiman, through the United Palestine Appeal, began fund-raising to finance the emigration, calling on Canadian Jews to "do our part" in aiding European Jews.

By September 1943 Freiman had become certain in the eventual victory of the Allied Powers. In his New Year's message he focused on the eventual rebuilding of Judaism, calling for more than "mere existence." He explained that Jews could only improve by living "on their own soil, in their own land, the land of their Fathers – in Eretz Israel."

Freiman's final speech on Zionism was read aloud at the Twenty-Seventh Zionist Convention in Montreal, on January 30, 1944, he being too sick to attend. His statement ended with a call for Jewish redemption:

It is only consonant with the war aims of the United Nations that our suffering and sacrifices in these last years should be recognized by the equalization of our status with that of every other people, by being granted the opportunity to rebuild Palestine as a Jewish Commonwealth within the framework of the British Commonwealth of Nations, thus assuring to us the opportunity of living our lives as normal people. The peace shall be won only to the extent that we, the weakest of the people, shall be meted justice.

== Death ==
On Sunday, June 4, 1944, Freiman and the greater Ottawa Jewish community attended Adath Jeshurun Synagogue for the unveiling of a tablet dedicated the memory of Rabbi J Mirsky. Freiman gave a speech before unveiling the tablet, beginning with an explanation that his doctor had advised him against attending. After his dedication finished he unveiled the tablet, stepped down from the pulpit, and turned to look at the stained glass window that had been dedicated to his wife. As he returned to the congregation and chanted the memorial prayer to the dead, El Mole Rachamin, Freiman slumped over. Two doctors present immediately came to his aid, and the congregation was ordered outside by the Cantor to give space. The doctors were unable to help Freiman, and at just before five-o'clock his death was announced to the waiting congregation. He was sixty-three years old.

=== Funeral ===
Freiman's funeral was held two days later, on June 6. It was attended by Prime Minister William Lyon Mackenzie King, who had been a personal friend, Ottawa mayor Stanley Lewis, representatives of the War Information Bureau, the Judiciary, Young Judea, the Canadian Jewish Congress, Histadrut, the Zionist Organization of America, the Red Cross, War veterans and an honor guard consisting of forty members of the Air Force.

Rabbi Fasman gave the eulogy:

The greatness of Archibald Jacob Freiman was not lodged in an ivory tower, was not embodied in a character that shunned realities and toyed with ideas far from the affairs of men. People loved him because they sensed that all his power as a personality was derived from a wholesome grasp upon their everyday problems. Business man that he was, he dealt with situations as they were, not as somebody might dream they ought to be ... In no country in the world has Zionism attained so dignified a stature as that height to which Archibald Jacob Freiman carried it in Canada ... Either a man lives forever or not at all. Archibald Jacob Freiman lived the only way to live – forever!

== Bibliography ==
- Abella, Irving (1990). A Coat of Many Colours: Two Centuries of Jewish Life in Canada. Toronto: Lester & Orpen Dennys Ltd. ISBN 0-88619-263-3.
- Azrieli, David J. (2008). Rekindling the Torch: Story of Canadian Zionism. Toronto: Key Porter Books Ltd. ISBN 978-1-55263-977-1.
- Bilsky, Anna (2009). A Common Thread: A History of the Jews of Ottawa. Renfrew, Ontario: General Store Publishing House. ISBN 978-1-897508-46-6.
- Figler, Bernard (1962). Lillian and Archie Freiman: Biographies. Montreal: The Northern Printing and Lithographing Co.
- Tulchinsky, Gerald (2008). Canada's Jews: A People's Journey. Toronto: University of Toronto Press. ISBN 978-0-8020-9386-8.
