= Ogilvy's =

Department store in Ottawa, Ontario, Canada

Coordinates: 45.42625°N 75.690442°W

Charles Ogilvy Limited
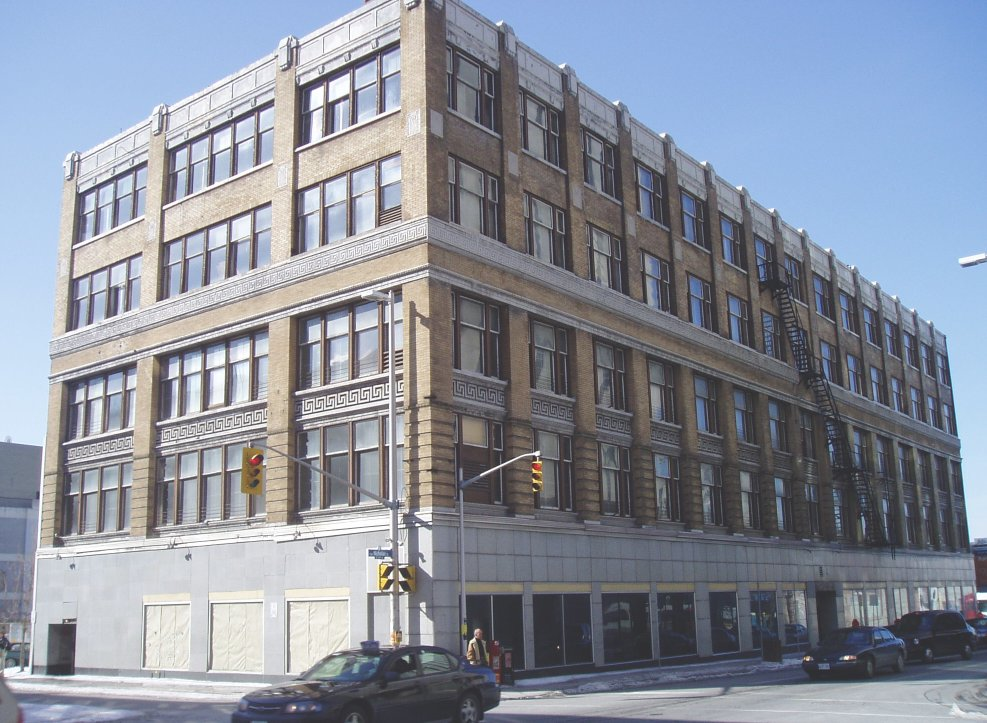
- The former Ogilvy's department store on Rideau Street
- Industry: Retail
- Founded: 1887
- Defunct: 1992 as Robinson's
- Fate: Merged with Robinson's, liquidated 1992, assets sold to The Bay
- Successor: Robinson's
- Headquarters: Ottawa, Ontario, Canada

Charles Ogilvy Limited, or Ogilvy's, was a department store in Ottawa, Ontario, Canada, founded in 1887. For much of the 20th century, Ogilvy's was one of Ottawa's higher-end department stores.

Charles Ogilvy (1861-1950) was born in Edinburgh, Scotland and emigrated to Canada with his family in 1863. His father, James Ogilvy, established a stationery store in Ottawa, and Charles followed in the retail business by opening his own dry goods shop at 92 Rideau Street in 1887. The business prospered and moved to new premises at 126 Rideau Street in 1907. The new store was designed by Ottawa architect W.E. Noffke, and the building was expanded in 1917, 1931 and 1934 (top two floors built in 1931 and 1934 were designed by architect A.J. Hazelgrove). Ogilvy's was a thriving retail enterprise, famous for its "tartan boxes". The success of Ottawa's local department stores, such as Ogilvy's, Freimans, Murphy-Gamble and Caplan's discouraged the expansion of national chains (including Eaton's, Simpson's, Simpsons-Sears and The Bay) into the National Capital Region until the 1950s (Simpsons-Sears opened its Carlingwood outlet in 1955).

The store's appearance was modernized in the 1940s, removing the original "ribbed" bricks on the front in favor of a more "refined" look. The larger windows were removed in the 1950s and smaller ones added with granite tops.

Over time, Ogilvy's opened a woodworking shop in Westboro and a number of small satellite stores in proximity to its Rideau Street store. In the 1960s, Ogilvy's opened a second location at the suburban Billings Bridge Plaza in south Ottawa. In later years, new suburban outlets at Lincoln Fields (in the west end) and Place d'Orléans (in the east end) were opened.

A fire occurred on December 29, 1969 at the downtown store which caused water damage to the main section, and the collapse of a warehouse/addition next door affected the store for a 2-month closure while they cleaned up the interior of "126 Rideau", which suffered major smoke and water damage, and rebuilt the warehouse next door that was totaled by fire. Followed by the expansion of national department store chains into Ottawa and the harsh economic climate of the 1980s, proved disastrous for Ogilvy's. The chain merged with the southern-Ontario Robinson's chain, and operated under the Robinson-Ogilvy banner for a number of years in the late 1980s and early 1990s. Eventually, the "Ogilvy" was dropped from the store name, and the small chain became known as "Robinson's". An era in Ottawa retailing was over.

The Place d'Orléans Robinson's store was the first to close in 1992, and the closure of the remaining Ottawa locations followed soon thereafter. In 1996, the Hudson's Bay Company acquired the remaining assets of Robinson-Ogilvy Ltd, although by that time the firm had been absent from Ottawa for four years.

Ogilvy's former Rideau Street store remained vacant in a corner of the Rideau Centre shopping mall property until 2013, when partial demolition began in preparation for a planned expansion of the mall. Since the building was designated under the Ontario Heritage Act in 2000, the original 1907 building's Rideau and Nicholas Street façades were preserved for incorporation into the new addition.

Work on the incorporation project started in December 2012 with removal of "test bays" in preparation of the removal of the façades to be kept and remounted on the new addition. Partial deconstruction of the 3rd, 4th, and 5th floors got underway in early March 2013, but on March 23, 2013, collapse of the northeast corner of the building temporarily halted demolition and closed streets surrounding the entire block cornered by Rideau, Nicholas and Besserer Streets. The collapse had no effect on the 2015 rebuild of the façade as all the necessary bricks had already been taken down and stored offsite for the rebuilding along with the original windows and decorative pieces.

In March 2013, the Charles Ogilvy Ltd Facebook Page was created by a fan to document/preserve the past, present, and future of the building and company. It is updated regularly with new photos and tidbits regarding the company and its future.

== See also ==
- List of Canadian department stores
