= Freimans =

Coordinates: 45.426148°N 75.692587°W

A.J. Freiman Limited
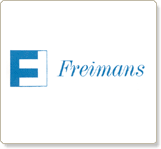

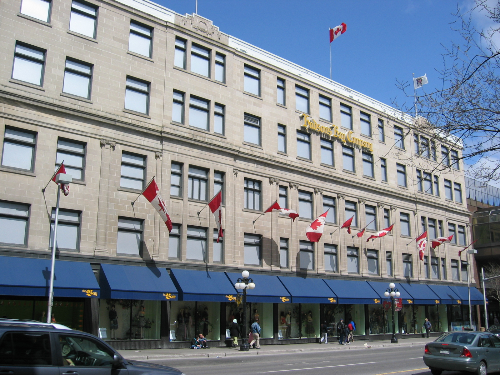
- Exterior of the former Freimans store (2006)
- Trade name: Freimans
- Type: Subsidiary
- Industry: Retail
- Genre: Department stores
- Founded: 1918; 108 years ago in Ottawa, Ontario, Canada
- Founder: Archibald Jacob Freiman
- Defunct: 1973; 53 years ago
- Fate: Acquisition by Hudson's Bay Company
- Successor: The Bay
- Headquarters: 73 Rideau Street, Ottawa, Ontario, Canada
- Area served: National Capital Region
- Parent: Hudson's Bay Company (1972–1973)

A.J. Freiman Limited (doing business as Freimans (Note: /ˈfriːmənz/ FREE-mənz)) was a Canadian department store founded in 1918 by Archibald Jacob Freiman.

== History ==
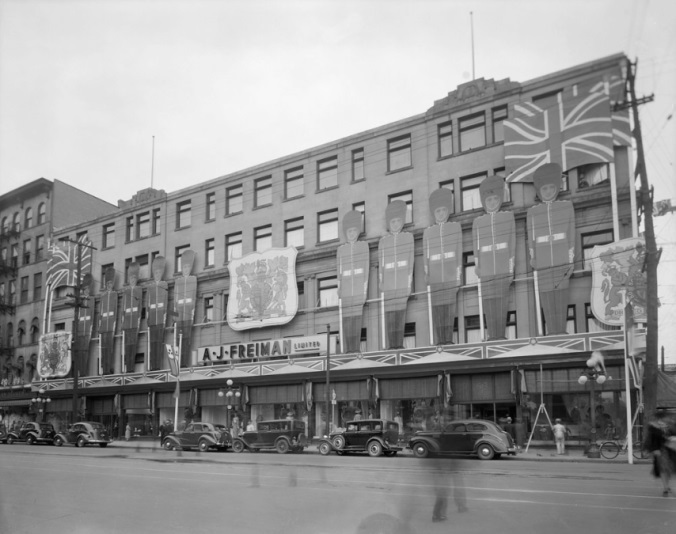
Freimans department store on Rideau Street, 1938

Archibald Jacob Freiman was born in Lithuania in 1880, and emigrated to Hamilton, Ontario. Freimans rose to become the most successful department store in Ottawa because of its prominent location at Mosgrove and Rideau Streets, its aggressive marketing and its low prices. The company also operated stores in Westgate and St. Laurent Shopping Centres, as well as discount stores called Freimart in Shoppers City West and Shoppers City East.

Then owned by A.J. Freiman's son, Lawrence (who wrote a book about the store), Hudson's Bay Company acquired the company in 1972 and rebranded it to The Bay in 1973. The former Freimans store continued to operate as a retail store of The Bay until the chain's closure in 2025, and an adjoining arcade linking Rideau Street to the Byward Market is named the Freiman Mall in honour of the longtime Ottawa retailer. In addition, the laneway around the north side of the nearby National Arts Centre which provides access to the box office has been named Lawrence Freiman Lane.

Freimans was also the centre of an important battle against antisemitism. In the 1930s, Ottawa police officer Jean Tissot, affiliated with Adrien Arcand's fascist movement, attempted to rally Christian Canadians to boycott Jewish businesses. Freimans, as the most prominent Jewish owned business in Ottawa was at the centre of his attacks. As a result, Freiman filed suit against Tissot, who was subsequently found guilty of criminal libel. The staunch condemnations of Tissot in the mainstream press and the utter failure of his movement to find support among the people led to a sound defeat for antisemitism in Ottawa.

== See also ==
- List of Canadian department stores
- Ogilvy's
- Murphy-Gamble
- Caplan's
