= Caplan's =

Department store in Ottawa, Canada

Caplan's (C. Caplan Limited) was a department store in Ottawa, Ontario, Canada. Caplan's began as a small dry goods shop in 1897, and operated over time at various locations throughout Ottawa. In 1916, the store moved to Rideau Street, where it grew into a department store and went on to become a retail landmark in the city. Sam Caplan, born in 1898, ran the store for many years, and became a noted figure in Ottawa's business and Jewish communities.

Along with Ogilvy's, Freimans and Murphy-Gamble, Caplan's was one of the local department stores that dominated Ottawa retailing for much of the twentieth century. In fact, Ottawa was unique among larger Canadian cities, as its local department stores were sufficiently successful to discourage the expansion of most national chains (including Eaton's, the Bay, and Simpson's) into the city until the 1950s.

In 1967, Caplan's acquired Shaffer's Limited, a neighbouring clothing store on Rideau Street, and another longtime Ottawa retailer. The acquisition allowed for the further expansion of Caplan's premises and its customer base. However, retailing trends over the subsequent decade and a half did not favour independent department stores such as Caplan's. The construction of the Rideau Centre across the street from the Caplan's store further reduced sales, and Caplan's closed on July 28, 1984 after more than 80 years in business. Sam Caplan had died one year earlier, and did not witness the closing of his eponymous store.

After the closure of the store, 1960s-era building extensions and design features were removed to reveal turn-of-the-century commercial façades that had been largely preserved. Shopping centre and office uses were proposed for the Caplan's site, but never reached the construction stage. In 2000, Ottawa City Council approved the construction of a cinema on the site, but that project also did not proceed. The city resisted subsequent efforts by the landowner to demolish the old Caplan's store façade, although neglect eventually lead to the fire marshall ordering its demolition in November 2003. As the site was located in a heritage conservation district protected under the Ontario Heritage Act, the city was able to secure the condition that a replica of the Rideau Street elevation be reconstructed as part of any future redevelopment on the site.

The former Caplan's warehouse, built in 1920 on King Edward Street, was transformed in 1969 into an off-site theatre studio of the National Arts Centre. Today, it serves as "La Nouvelle Scène", a francophone theatre venue.
