= ByWard Market =

Retail and entertainment district in Ottawa, Canada

- Market building in 2026
- Location: 55 ByWard Market Square Ottawa, Ontario K1N 9C3; 45.4271°N 75.6923°W
- Goods sold: Produce, Souvenirs, Food, Jewellery
- Website: www.byward-market.com
- Interactive map of ByWard Market

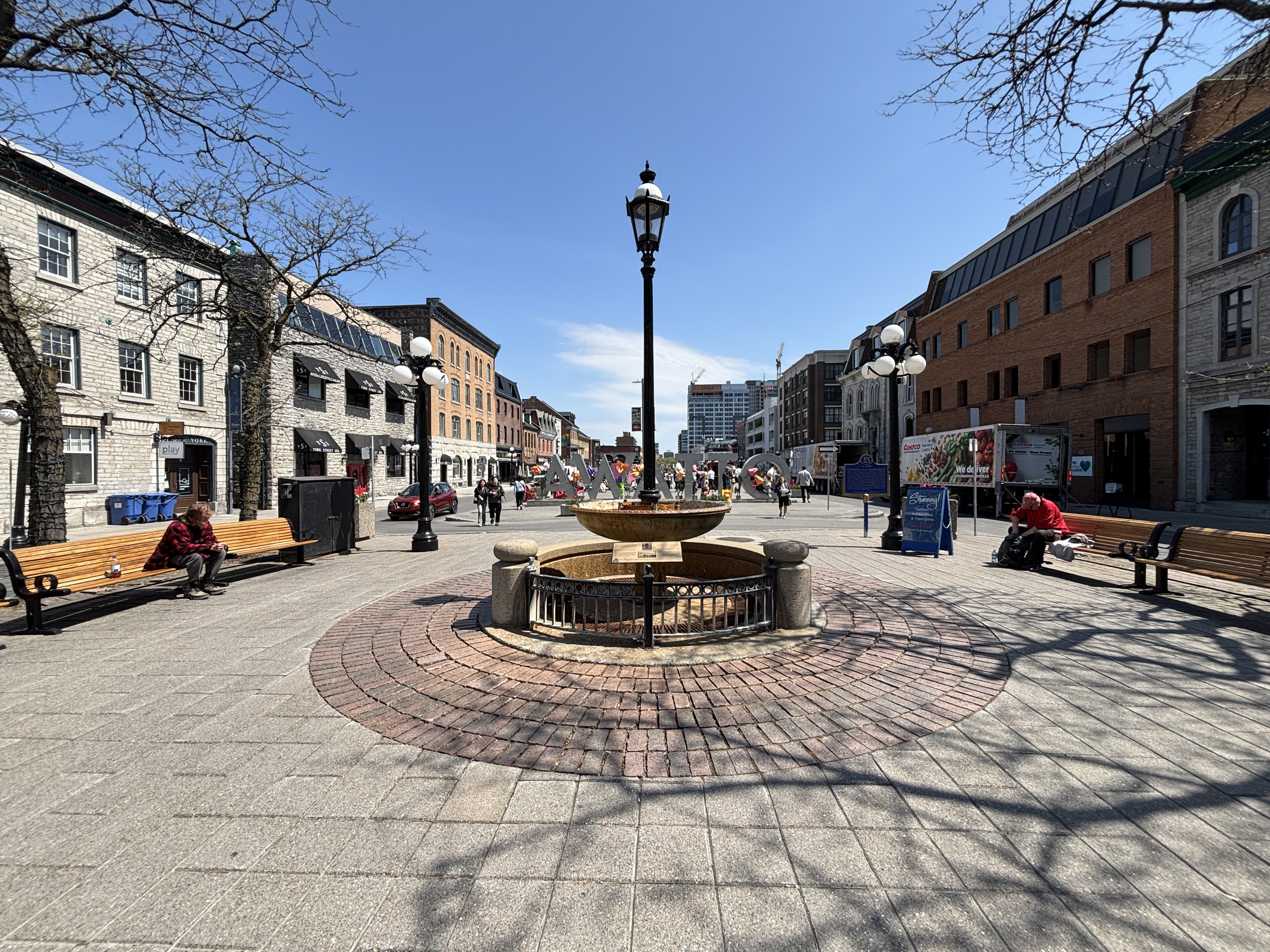
York Street Millennium Fountain in the ByWard Market

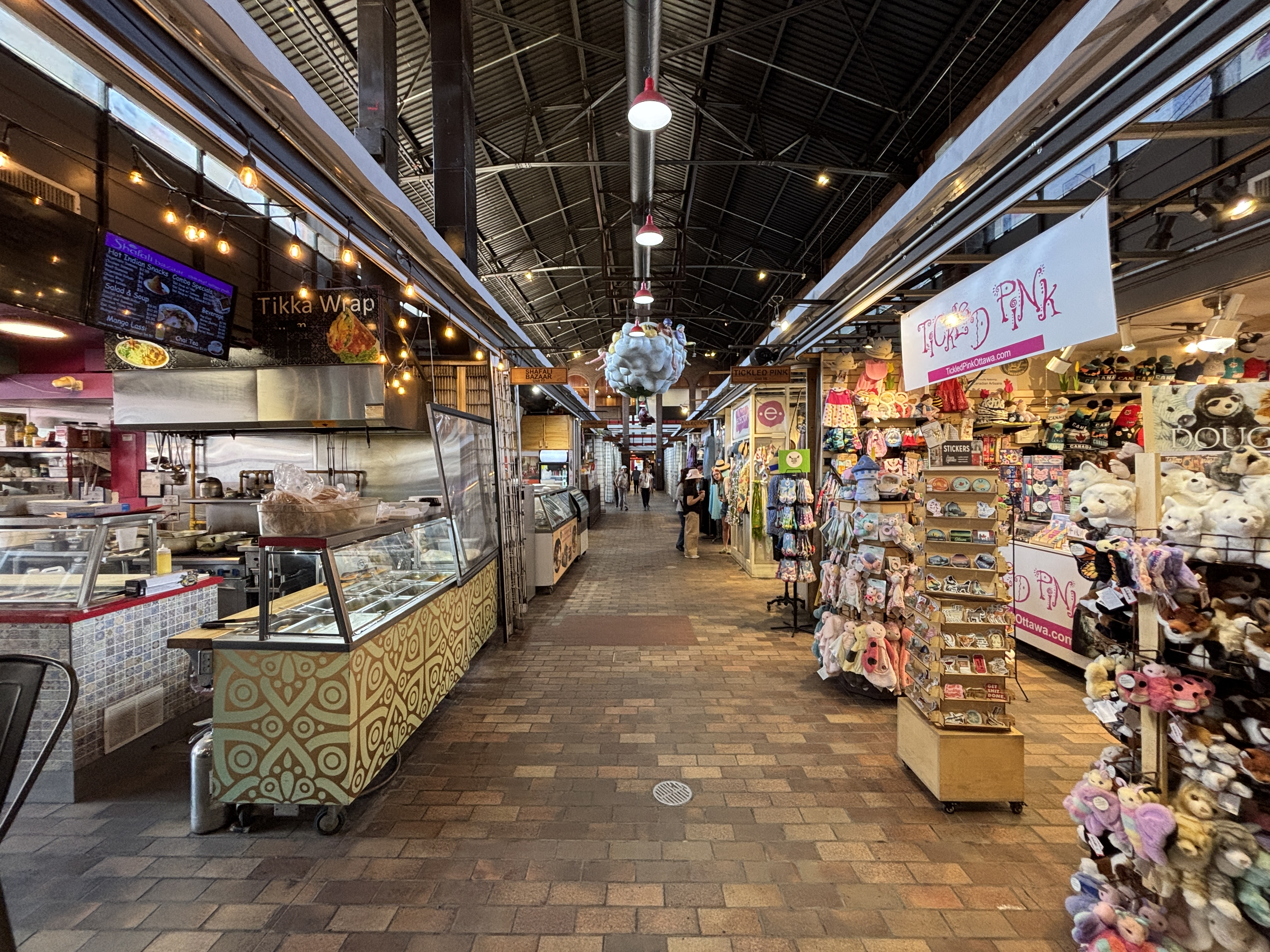
The Byward Market Building interior

The ByWard Market (French: Marché By) is a retail and entertainment district in the downtown core of Ottawa, Ontario, Canada to the east of Parliament Hill and Major's Hill Park. The market buildings are open all year long. Weather permitting, vendors at the outdoor markets along George, York, ByWard, and William streets sell fresh produce, flowers, crafts, and souvenirs.

The district is bounded by:

- Sussex Drive and Mackenzie Avenue (to the west),
- Cumberland Street (east)
- Cathcart Street (north), and
- Rideau Street (south).

The market's name refers to the old "By Ward" of the City of Ottawa, named after the engineer and surveyor John By. The district comprises the main commercial part of the historic Lower Town area of Ottawa.

According to the Canada 2011 Census, the population of the area was 3,063.

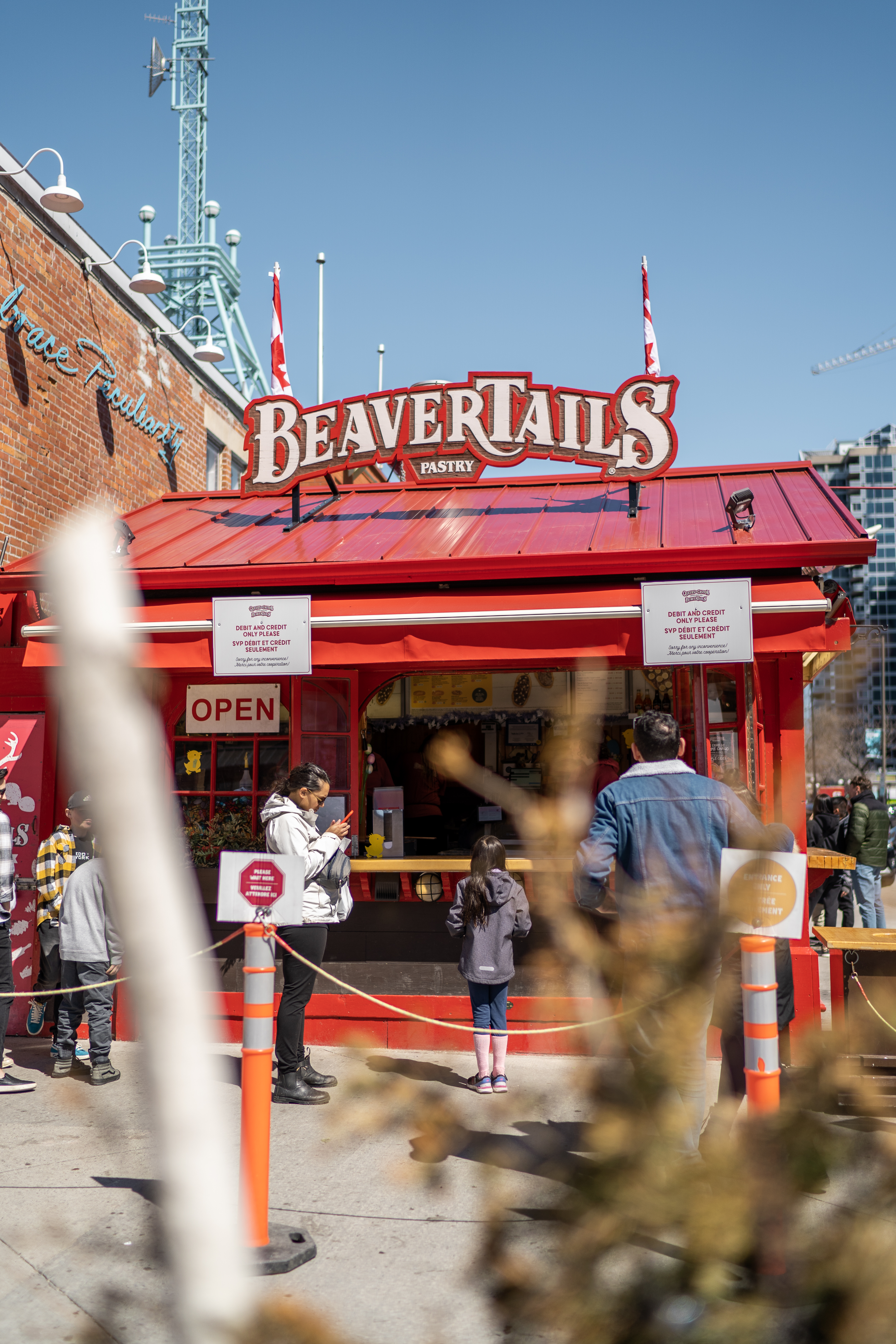
The BeaverTail is a fried dough pastry that is sold in a variety of flavours.

The market is regulated by a City of Ottawa through the ByWard Market District Authority. The Authority also operates the smaller west-end Parkdale Market. The Authority is run by a nine-member board of directors.

In February 2009 Obama visited the market on his way to Ottawa Macdonald–Cartier International Airport and purchased BeaverTails and then went to Le Moulin de Provence, a local French bakery to purchase maple leaf shaped cookies for his daughters that became known as "Obama Tail" and "Obama cookies", respectively.

== Neighbourhood ==
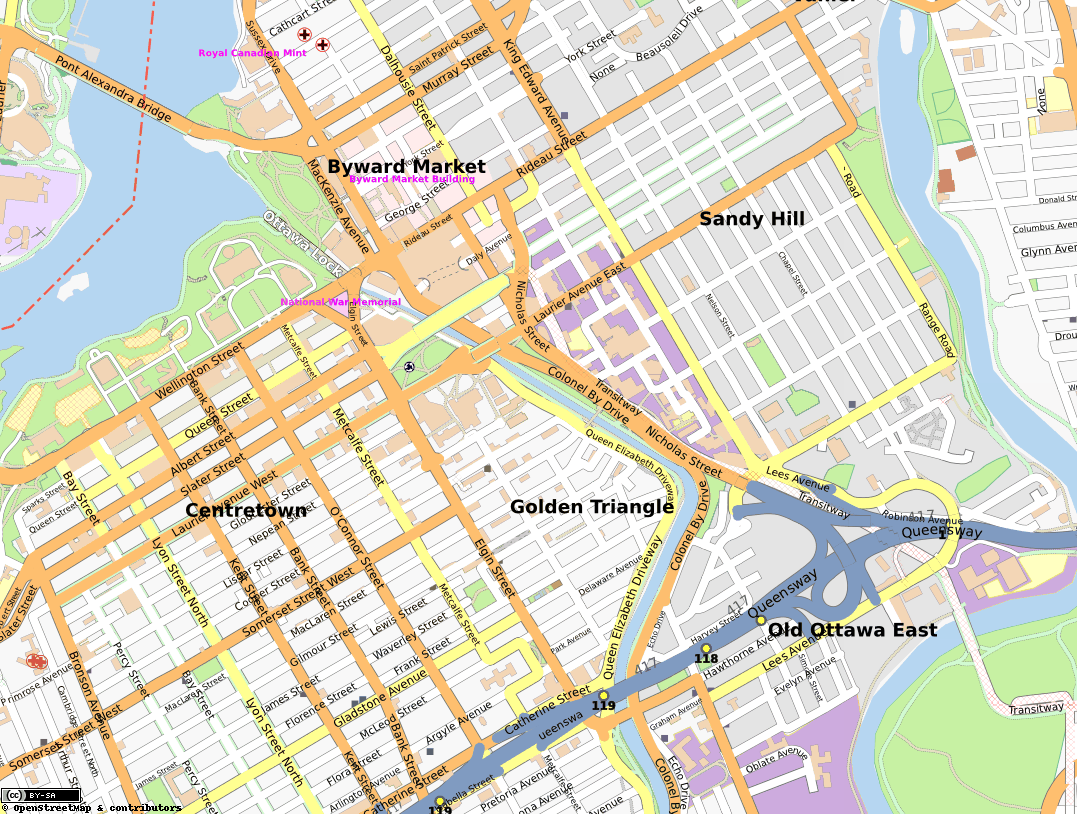
Map of the east-end of Downtown Ottawa

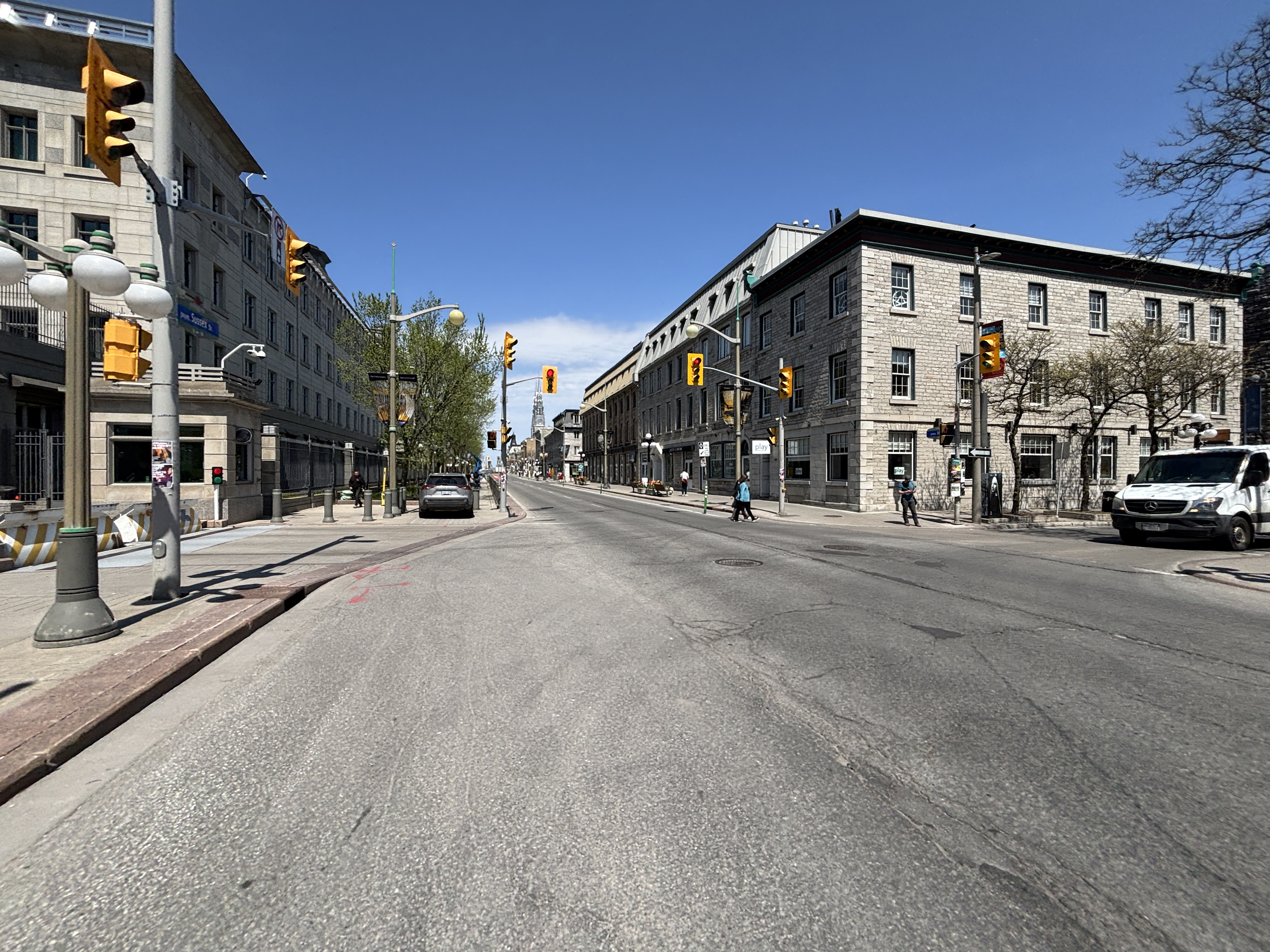
Sussex Drive near York Street

Traditionally, the ByWard Market area has been a focal point for Ottawa's French and Irish communities. The large Catholic community supported the construction of the Notre-Dame Cathedral Basilica, one of the largest and oldest Roman Catholic churches in Ottawa. The shape of the cathedral was taken into account in the design of the National Gallery of Canada, which was built across Sussex Drive.

The ByWard Market has been an area of constant change, adapting to the increasingly cosmopolitan nature of downtown Ottawa, as well as trends in Canadian society as a whole. Recently, a multitude of restaurants and specialty food stores have sprouted around the market area, making this neighbourhood one of the liveliest in Ottawa outside of normal business hours. A four-block area around the market provides the densest concentration of eating places, bars, and nightclubs in the National Capital Region. The areas beyond this zone also offer boutiques and restaurants in abundance, and are frequented by a considerable number of buskers. Having acquired a reputation as the city's premier bar district, the Byward Market is thronged (brimming) at night with university students and other young adults.

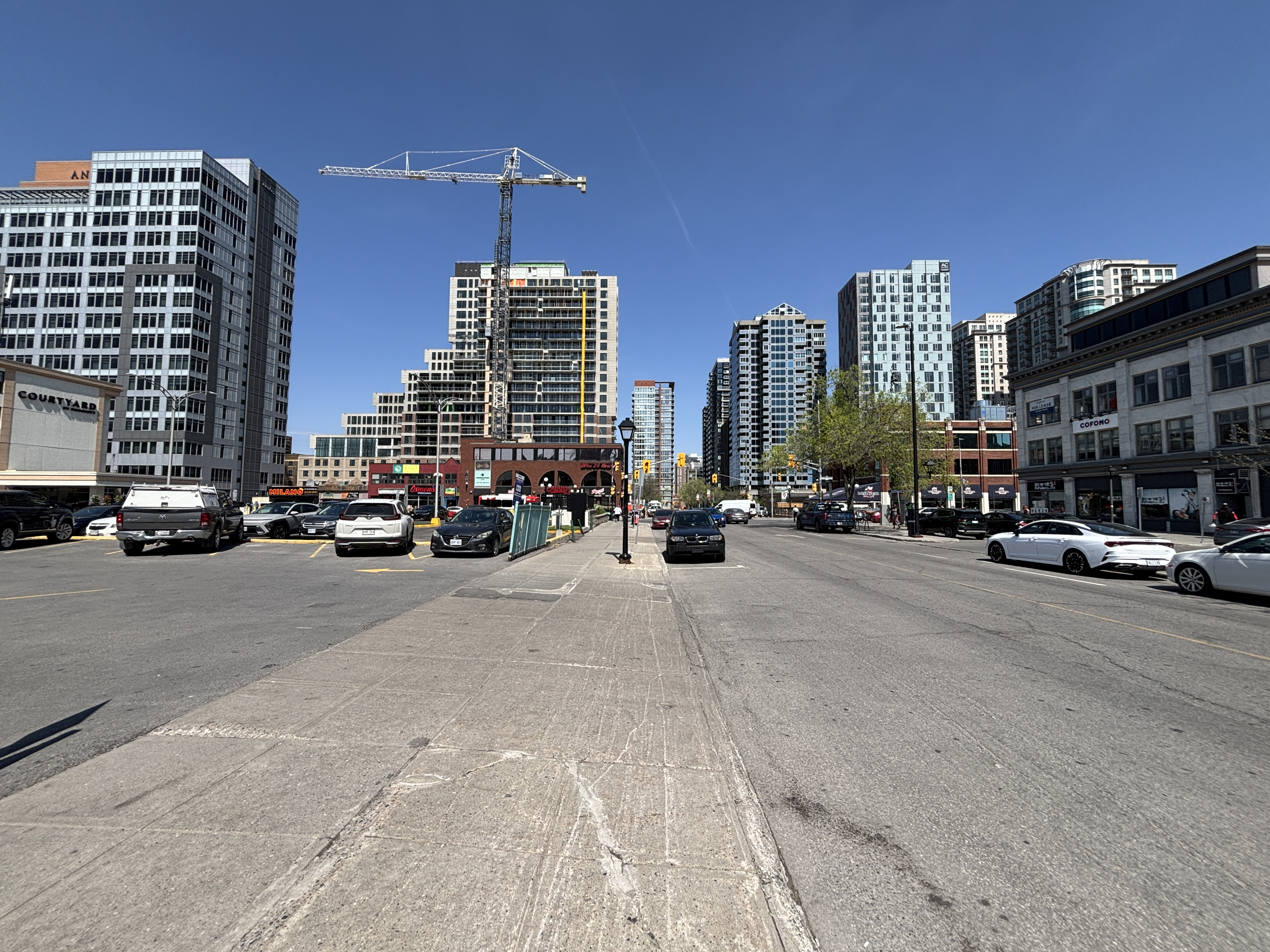
Condominium view from George Street

Over the years, the city has developed five open-air courtyards immediately east of Sussex Drive, stretching from Saint Patrick Street to George Street. These cobblestone courtyards are filled with flowers, park benches, fountains, and sculptures. Several of the houses surrounding them are historic buildings. On the west side of Sussex Drive is the United States Embassy. The building's design, by noted architect David Childs, was supposedly widely criticized by surrounding residents, as one particular Ottawa Sun newspaper article reported that the bronze building-block sculpture created by Joel Shapiro and dedicated by Hillary Clinton was "glaringly and gratingly American", whereas some critics declared that the building's new design "reflected a cautious world view".

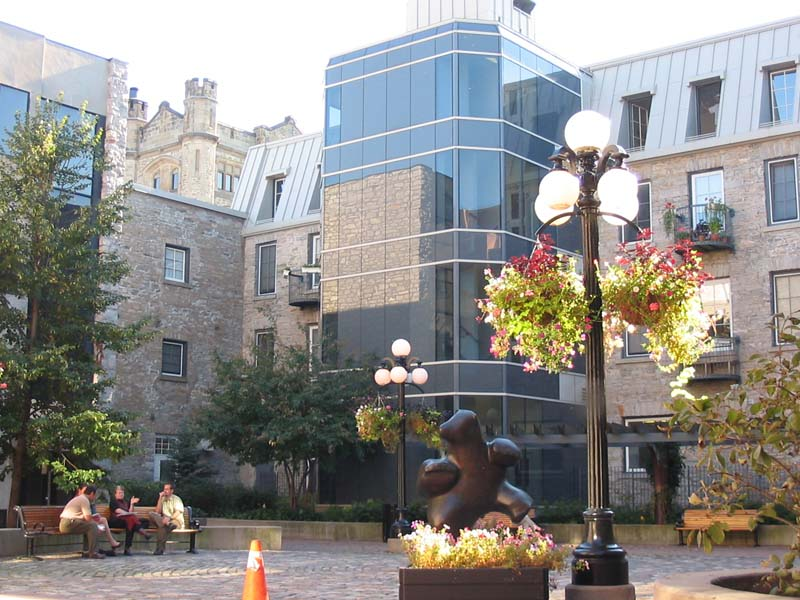
Jeanne D'Arc Court, the courtyard at George and Sussex

The neighbourhood today is markedly heterogeneous; being visited by a mix of young professionals, many families, and tourists. The area is mainly English-speaking, but there exists a significant francophone population as well. The Market is located in close proximity to the downtown Rideau Centre shopping mall, to Parliament Hill, and to a number of foreign embassies.

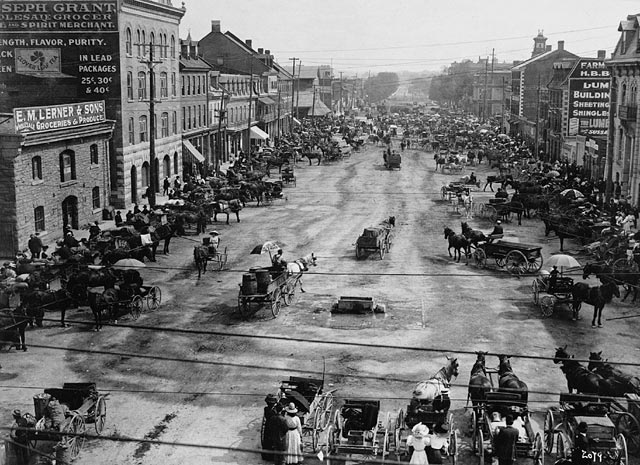
York Street in the ByWard Market c. 1911

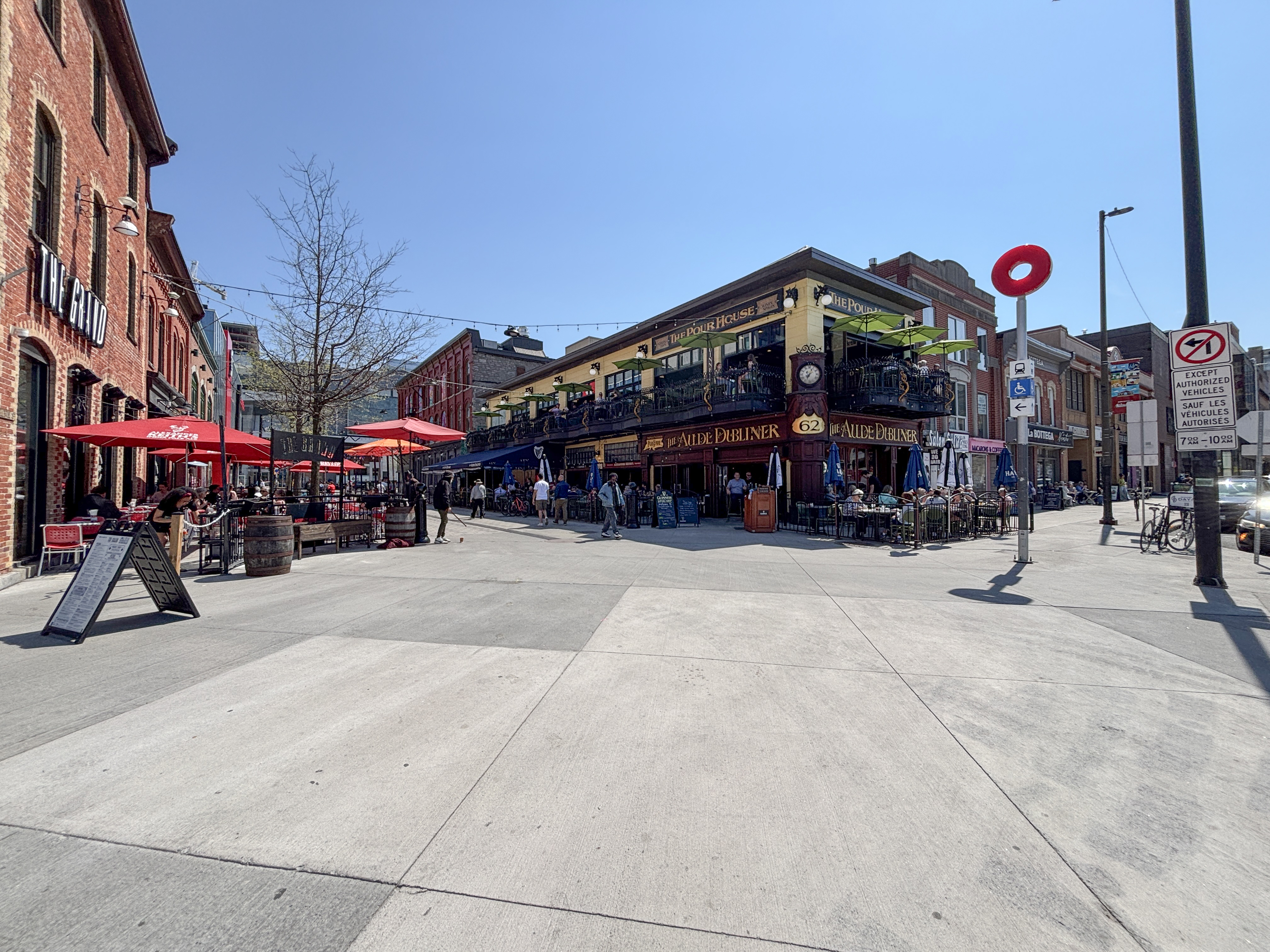
William Street walking area in 2025

In October 2000, broadcaster CHUM Limited opened a new studio complex in the ByWard Market at 87 George Street, known as the CHUM MarketMediaMall. CHUM's then-NewNet station CHRO moved its primary operations from its original facilities in Pembroke to the new building (including a Speaker's Corner video booth); the facility also housed CHUM Radio stations CKKL-FM, CJMJ-FM, CFRA and CFGO. The facility came under CTV ownership when CTVglobemedia bought CHUM Limited in 2006, and then under Bell ownership when Bell Media re-purchased the CTV assets in 2011. When a fire broke out at the studio complex of CTV owned-and-operated station CJOH-DT in Nepean in 2010, destroying it, this meant CJOH moved into the MarketMediaMall complex as well.

== See also ==
- List of Ottawa neighbourhoods
- List of designated heritage properties in Ottawa
