= Rideau Street =

Street in Ottawa, Ontario, Canada

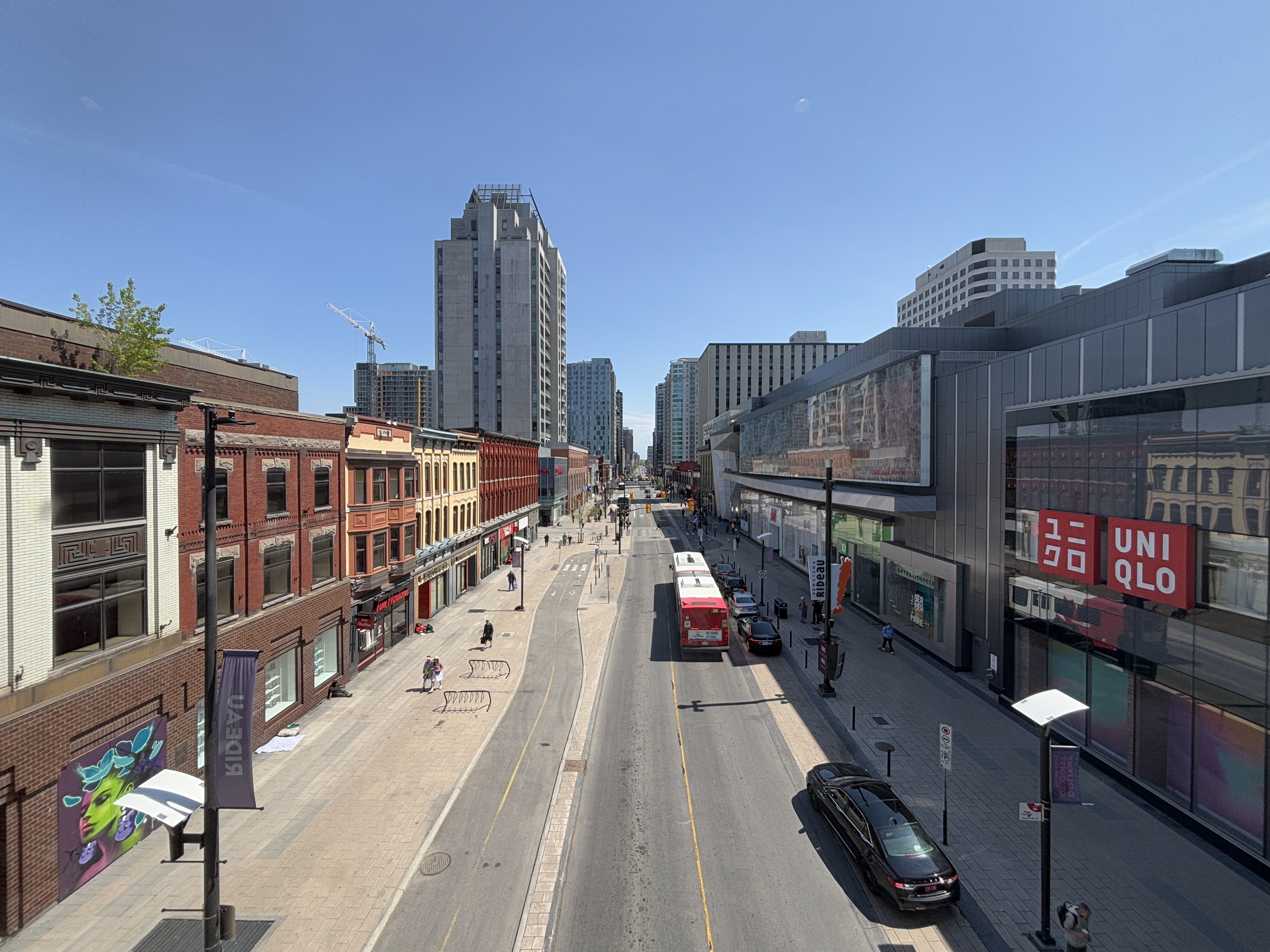
Rideau Street near CF Rideau Centre in 2025

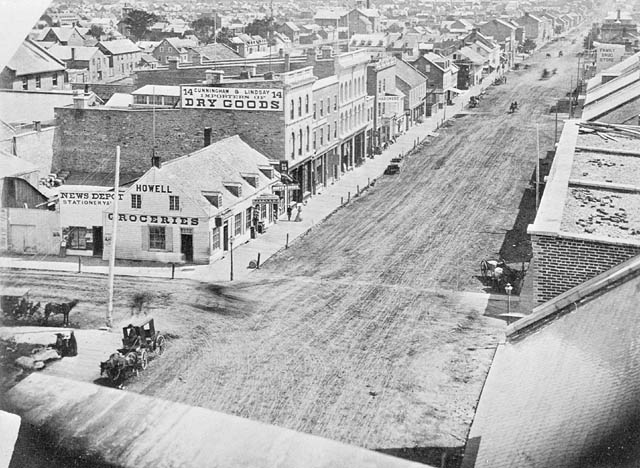
Rideau and Dalhousie in 1860

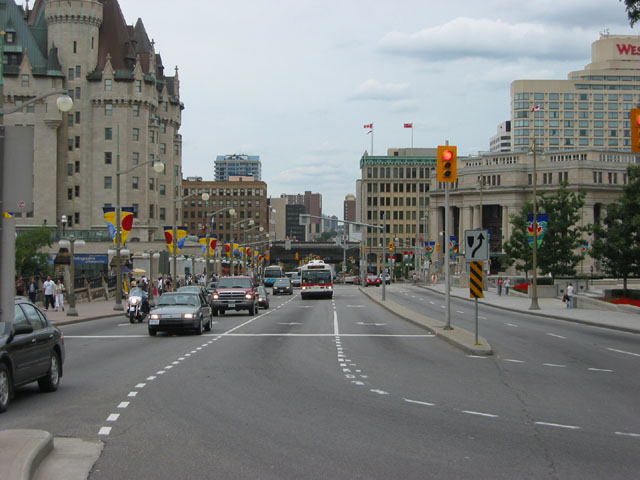
View toward Rideau Street from Confederation Square

Rideau Street (French: Rue Rideau) is a major street in downtown Ottawa, Ontario, Canada, and one of Ottawa's oldest and most famous streets running from Wellington Street in the west to Montreal Road in the east where it connects to the Vanier district. Rideau Street is home to the Château Laurier, the CF Rideau Centre and the Government Conference Centre (Ottawa's former central train station). Along with Wellington Street and Sussex Drive it was among the first streets in Ottawa to be host to businesses; it was created with the founding of the earlier settlement Bytown. The Plaza Bridge by the Rideau Canal is at its westernmost point and the Cummings Bridge is at its easternmost point.

For many years, Rideau Street was one of Ottawa's primary retail thoroughfares, containing department stores such as Freimans, Ogilvy's, Woolworth, Caplan's and Metropolitan.

In November 1979, then mayor Marion Dewar examined a plan to create what became the 'Rideau Street Bus Mall.' Sidewalks from Sussex to Dalhousie were enclosed in a continuous glass-and-steel structure. The heated mall was expected to allow pedestrians to shop in comfort year-round. However, the structure had an unanticipated downside, in that it attracted large numbers of homeless and late-night drinkers. Many establishments along the affected stretch of Rideau Street failed as a result. The decision was made to tear the shelters down, and in the end the cost for dismantling them was almost as much as the $6.5 million incurred in their construction. Although the local department stores are gone, Rideau Street still features the Rideau Centre shopping mall, and the street is adjacent to shops of the Byward Market. The street had been designated Highway 17B before the Ontario government discontinued it in 1998.

To the north of Rideau, east of King Edward Avenue is the traditional Lower Town district of Ottawa, a residential area which in the past was predominantly Francophone, but now has one of Ottawa's largest immigrant populations, notably including many Francophone Africans and Somalis. North of Rideau and west of King Edward is the commercial ByWard Market area.

To the south of Rideau Street is the Sandy Hill neighbourhood, with its mix of embassies, older houses, low- and high-rise apartment buildings, and student housing.

The portion of the street between Nicholas Street and King Edward Avenue is designated as part of Canada's National Highway System, as part of an interconnecting route between Highway 417 and Quebec Autoroute 5 in Gatineau.

== 2016 sinkholes ==
A section of Rideau Street was closed to all traffic from June 8 to July 2, 2016, after it collapsed in the vicinity of excavations being made for the Rideau station of the Confederation Line. Later that year, on October 2, a much smaller sinkhole opened in the same area as the June 8 sinkhole. Due to the sinkholes, Rideau Street was closed to regular traffic from Sussex to Dalhousie until further notice. Only buses, taxis, construction vehicles, and delivery vehicles were permitted.

The street did not fully reopen to regular traffic until the middle of December 2020.

== See also ==
- Rideau Street Chapel
- Rideau Street McDonald's
- Sussex Drive
- Wallis House
- Wellington Street (Ottawa)
