= Canada–Iraq relations =

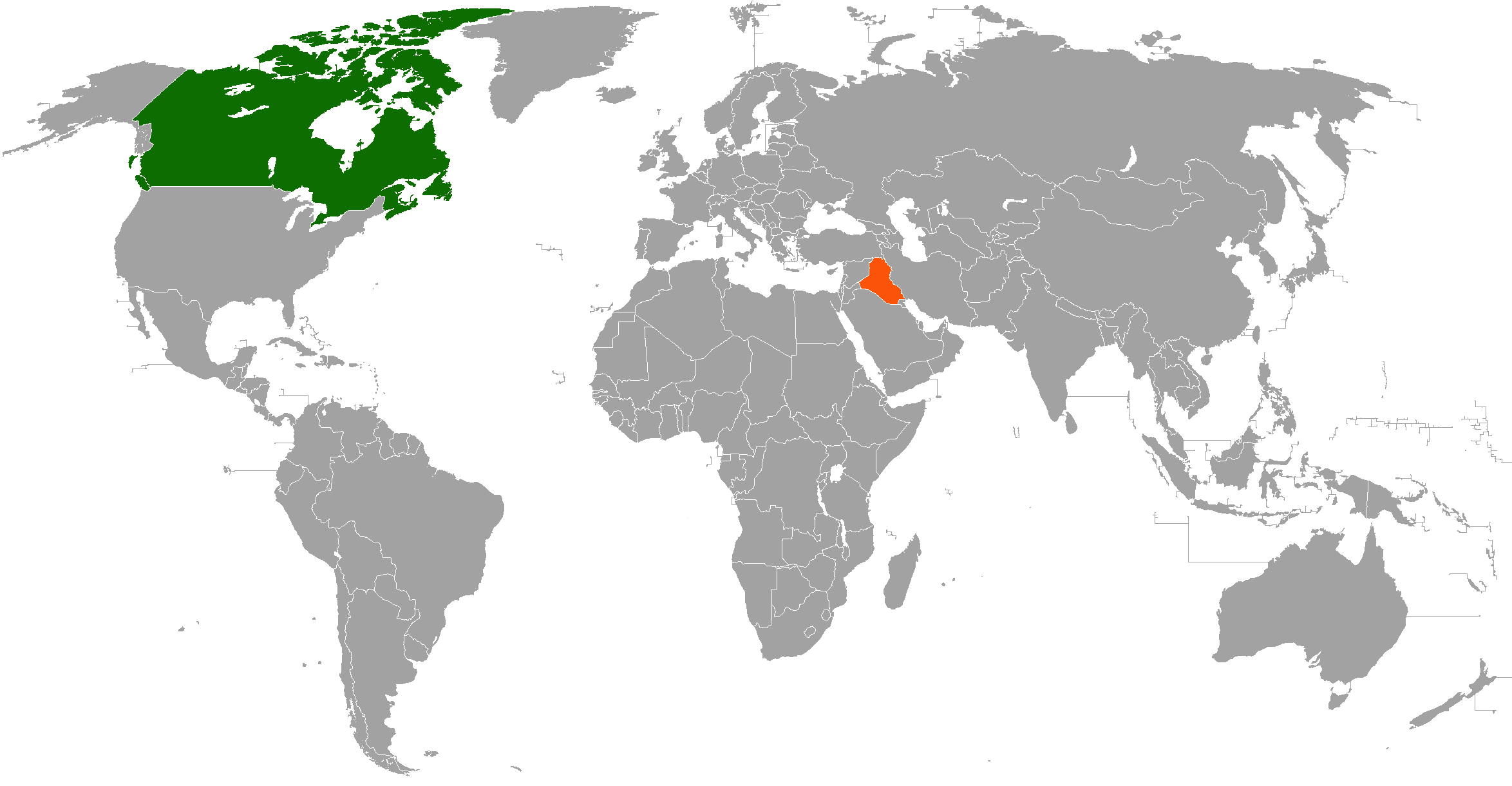

- Canada: Iraq

The Canada–Iraq relations are the bilateral relations between Canada and Iraq. Both countries established embassies in their respective capitals in the 1960s. Canada is diplomatically accredited within the British embassy in Baghdad and a Consulate-General in Erbil. Iraq has an embassy and a Consulate-General in Ottawa and two Consulate-Generals in Montreal and Mississauga. Though both had been part of the British Empire, only Canada is part of the Commonwealth, Iraq is not.

== History ==
Diplomatic relations between Canada and Iraq were established in 1961.

== Iraqi diplomatic mission in Ottawa ==
Embassy of Iraq in Ottawa
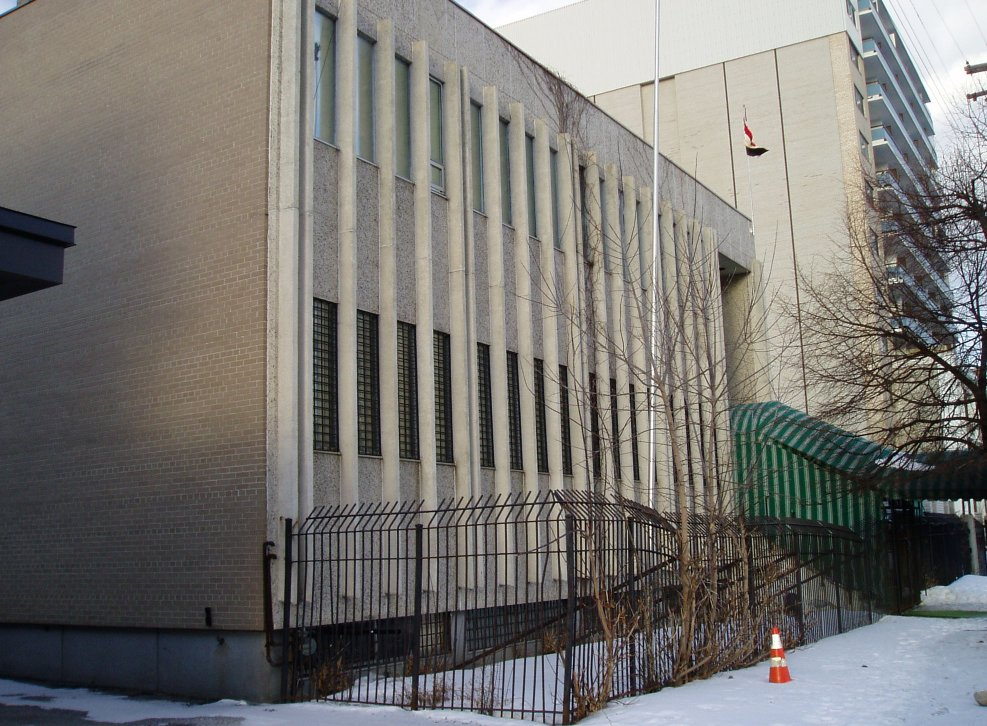
- The old chancery at 215 McLeod Street. The embassy has since moved to Laurier Avenue.
- Location: Ottawa, Ontario, Canada
- Address: 189 Laurier Ave. East
- Coordinates: 45°24′49″N 75°41′19″W
- Ambassador: Dr. Abdlu-Rahman Al-Hussaini

The Embassy of Iraq, Ottawa is the embassy of Iraq in Ottawa, Ontario, Canada. It is located at 189 Laurier Ave. East having moved there since 2014 with the former McLeod Street location now an honorary consulate. In the 1980s, the diplomatic embassy in Ottawa was situated at 215 McLeod Street, in a building constructed in 1957 and was best known for its gala party held each year at the Château Laurier to celebrate Iraq National Day. In the late 1980s, plans were underway to build an elaborate new chancery costing $5 million in Lower Town, next door to the Chinese embassy.

The 1991 Iraqi invasion of Kuwait and the culmination of the ensuing Gulf War was irreversibly devastating on the embassy conduction of service. Four of Iraq's diplomats were expelled from Canada. Hisham Ibrahim al-Shawi, a respected intellectual and career diplomat remained as ambassador but had his activities severely curtailed. The plans for the new chancery were scrapped. In April 1991, in response to events in Iraq, a Kurdish mob attacked the embassy with stones and Molotov cocktails, but little damage and no injuries resulted. In 1994, months before he was set to retire and return to Iraq, al-Shawi flew to London with US$155,950.85 and CA$273,530 of the embassy's money, which he publicly declared and deposited in a trust fund to be used by a future government of Iraq. In London, he defected and became involved in the Iraqi opposition.

Iraqi former President Saddam Hussein never replaced al-Shawi as an ambassador and for a number of years, the embassy was run by more junior officers. In the late 1990s the embassy was perennially short of cash and got in trouble for paying employees in alcohol and cigarettes. The Canadian government did not bow to U.S. pressure to close the embassy during the 2003 invasion of Iraq, but Canada did expel a number of diplomats on suspicion of espionage. The lone Iraqi diplomat who remained, chargé d'affaires Mamdouh Mustafa, shuttered himself inside the embassy, attending few functions and refusing to talk to the media. In December 2003 Mustafa returned to Iraq, leaving the embassy vacant. In May 2004 the embassy reopened with a staff dispatched by the new Iraqi government, and a new then-ambassador Howar Ziad arrived at the end of the year.

== Canadian diplomatic consulate in Baghdad ==
Embassy of Canada in Baghdad
- Location: Baghdad, Iraq
- Address: British Embassy Compound, International Zone, Baghdad
- Coordinates: 33°18′43″N 44°23′44″E
- Ambassador: Christopher Boehm

After having closed its diplomatic mission in Baghdad in 1991 due to the Gulf war, relations were re-established in 2019, with an accredited diplomatic consulate inaugurated within the British embassy in the International Zone. Christopher Boehm serves as the envoy Canadian ambassador having been appointed by Mélanie Joly, Minister of Foreign Affairs on September 5, 2024. On October 15, 2024, Deputy Prime Minister and Foreign Minister Fuad Hussein received Boehm's credentials.

== See also ==
- Foreign relations of Canada
- Foreign relations of Iraq
- Iraqi Canadians
- List of diplomatic missions in Canada
- List of diplomatic missions of Canada
- Iraqi diplomatic missions
