= Howar =

Howar is both a surname and a given name. Notable people with the name include:

- Tim Howar (born 1969), Canadian actor, singer and dancer
- Howar Ziad, Iraqi diplomat

== See also ==
- Howard
