= List of diplomatic missions in Iraq =

This is a list of diplomatic missions in Iraq. There are 59 embassies in Baghdad, and several other countries maintain consulates in Erbil, Basra, Mosul and Najaf.

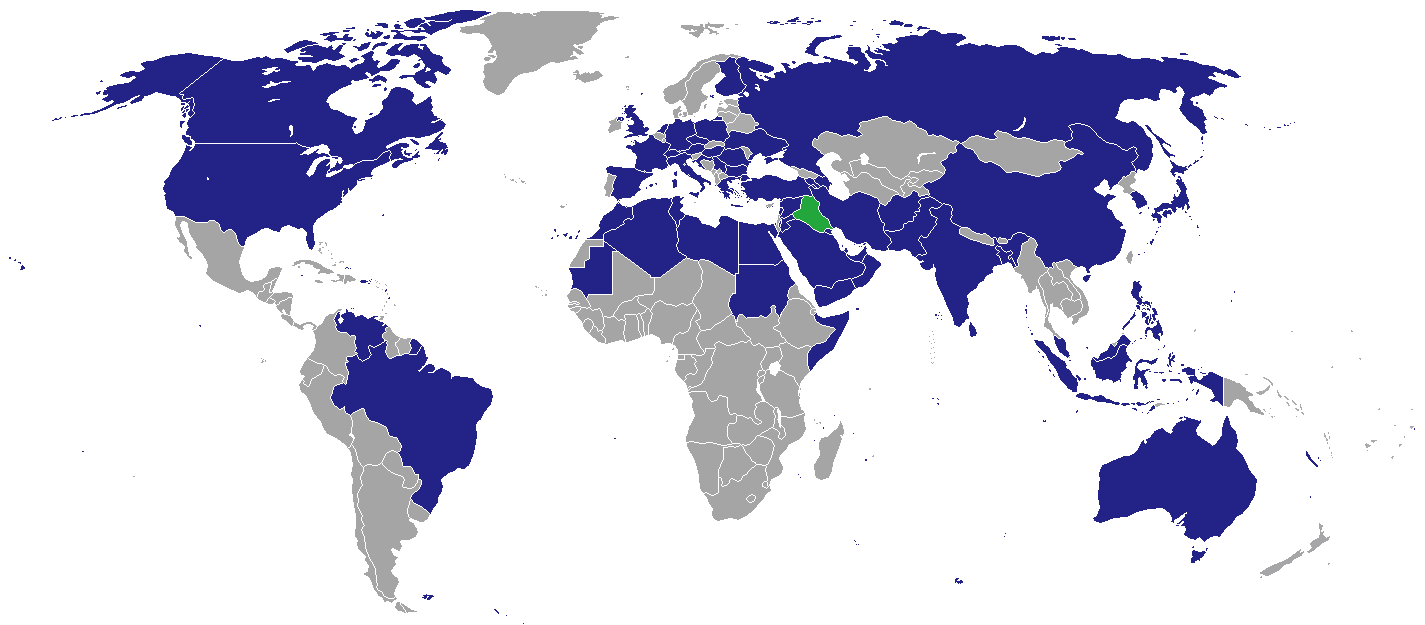
Map of diplomatic missions in Iraq

== Resident missions in Baghdad ==
=== Embassies ===
1. Afghanistan
2. Algeria
3. Armenia
4. Austria
5. Australia
6. Azerbaijan
7. Bahrain
8. Bangladesh
9. Brazil
10. Bulgaria
11. Canada
12. China
13. Croatia
14. Czechia
15. Egypt
16. Finland
17. France
18. Germany
19. Greece
20. Holy See
21. Hungary
22. India
23. Indonesia
24. Iran
25. Italy
26. Japan
27. Jordan
28. Kuwait
29. Lebanon
30. Libya
31. Malaysia
32. Mauritania
33. Morocco
34. Netherlands
35. Oman
36. Pakistan
37. Palestine
38. Philippines
39. Poland
40. Qatar
41. Romania
42. Russia
43. Saudi Arabia
44. Serbia
45. Somalia
46. South Korea
47. Spain
48. Sri Lanka
49. Sudan
50. Switzerland
51. Syria
52. Tunisia
53. Turkey
54. Ukraine
55. United Arab Emirates
56. United Kingdom
57. United States
58. Venezuela
59. Yemen

=== Gallery ===
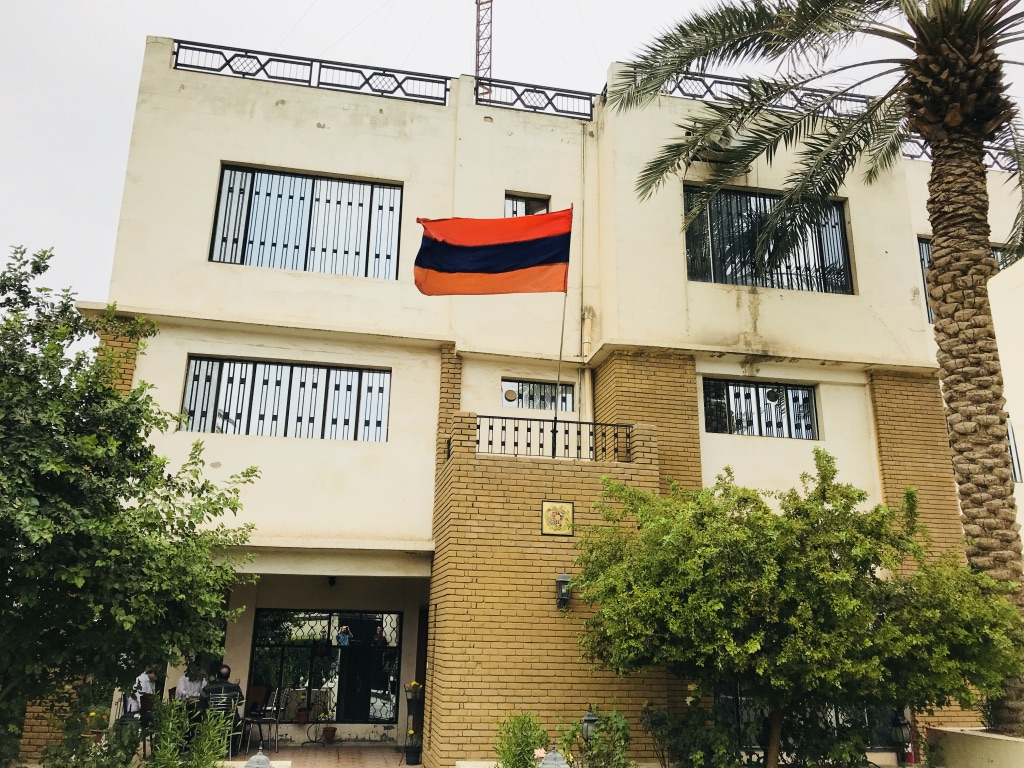
Embassy of Armenia

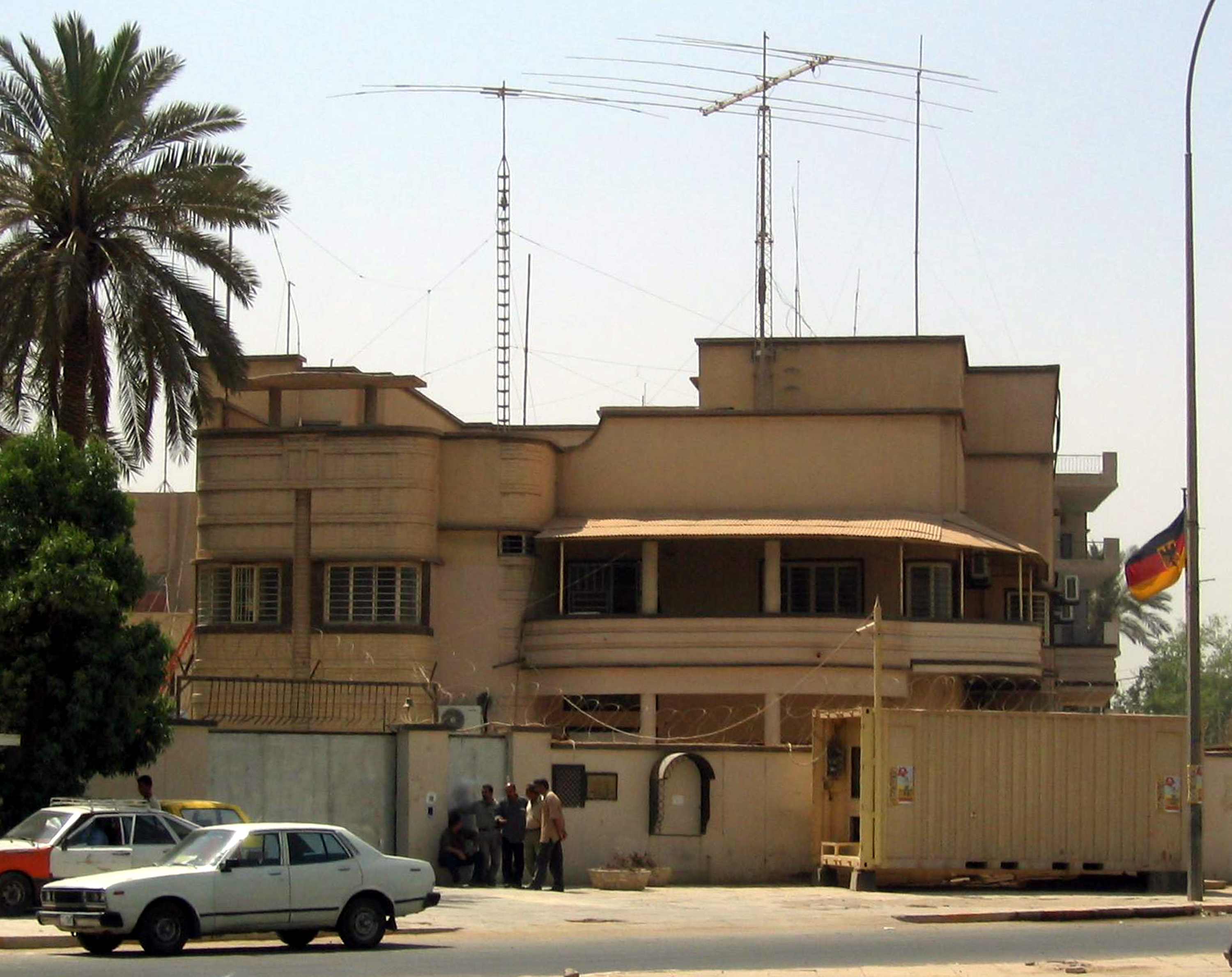
Embassy of Germany

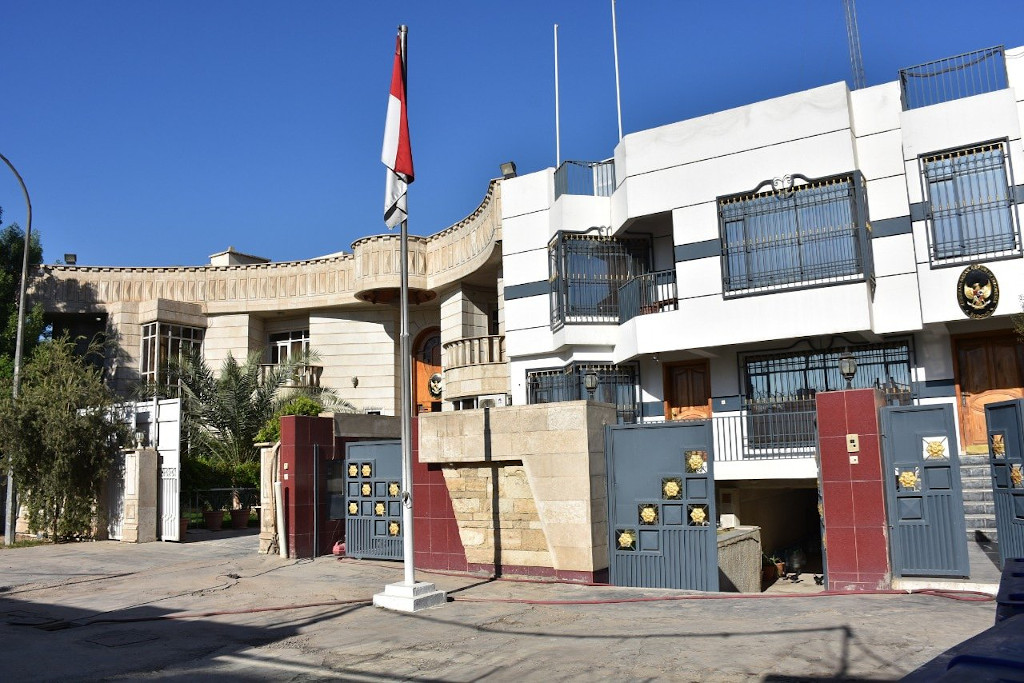
Embassy of Indonesia

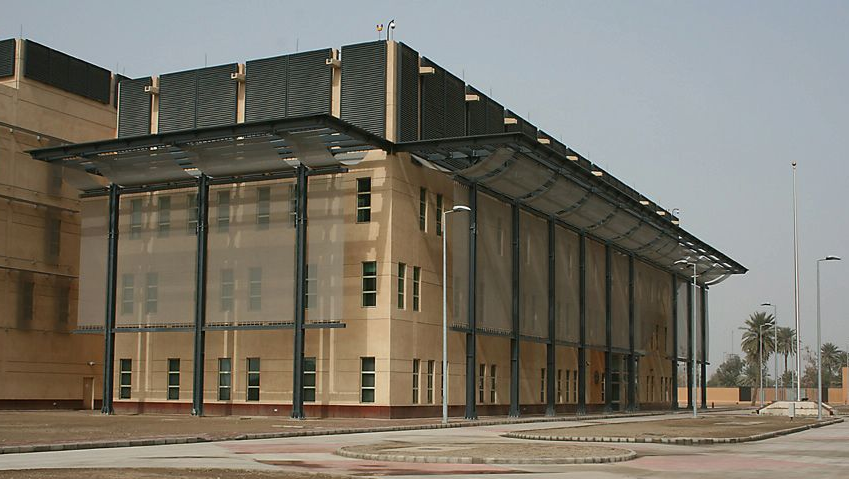
Embassy of the United States

== Consular missions ==
=== Basra ===
- China
- Egypt
- Iran
- Kuwait
- Russia
- Turkey

=== Karbala ===
- Iran

=== Erbil, Kurdistan Region ===
- Armenia
- China
- Czech Republic
- Egypt
- France
- Germany
- Greece
- Hungary
- India
- Iran
- Italy
- Japan (Consular Office)
- Jordan
- Kuwait
- Netherlands
- Palestine
- Poland
- Qatar
- Romania
- Russia
- Saudi Arabia
- South Korea
- Sudan
- Turkey
- United Arab Emirates
- United Kingdom
- United States

=== Sulaymaniyah, Kurdistan Region ===
- Iran

=== Mosul ===
- Turkey

=== Najaf ===
- Bahrain
- Iran

== Non-resident embassies accredited to Iraq ==
- Albania (Ankara)
- Andorra (Madrid)
- Angola (Ankara)
- Antigua and Barbuda (Beirut)
- Argentina (Tehran)
- Bahamas (New Delhi)
- Belarus (Ankara)
- Belgium (Amman)
- Belize (Abu Dhabi)
- Benin (Kuwait City)
- Bolivia (Amman)
- Botswana (Kuwait City)
- Bosnia and Herzegovina (Amman)
- Brunei (Kuala Lumpur)
- Burkina Faso (Ankara)
- Burundi (Ankara)
- Cabo Verde
- Cambodia (Ankara)
- Chile (Cairo)
- Congo-Brazzaville (Ankara)
- Congo-Kinshasa (Ankara)
- Cameroon (Cairo)
- Central African Republic (Cairo)
- Chad (Ankara)
- Colombia (Riyadh)
- Comoros (Abu Dhabi)
- Costa Rica (Ankara)
- Côte d'Ivoire (Ankara)
- Cuba (Tehran)
- Cyprus (Amman)
- Djibouti (Ankara)
- Dominica (Abu Dhabi)
- Dominican Republic (Cairo)
- Ecuador (Doha)
- El Salvador (Doha)
- Equatorial Guinea (Riyadh)
- Eritrea (Abu Dhabi)
- Estonia (Cairo)
- Eswatini (Abu Dhabi)
- Ethiopia (Kuwait City)
- Fiji (Abu Dhabi)
- Gabon (Cairo)
- Gambia (Ankara)
- Georgia (Amman)
- Ghana (Kuwait City)
- Grenada (Dubai)
- Guatemala (Abu Dhabi)
- Guinea (Tehran)
- Guinea-Bissau (Tehran)
- Guyana (Kuwait City)
- Haiti (Doha)
- Honduras (Kuwait City)
- Iceland (New Delhi)
- Ireland (Amman)
- Jamaica (Kuwait City)
- Kazakhstan (Amman)
- Kenya (Riyadh)
- Kiribati (Beijing)
- Kyrgyzstan (Ankara)
- Laos (Kuwait City)
- Latvia (Ankara)
- Lesotho (Kuwait City)
- Liberia (Istanbul)
- Liechtenstein (Berlin)
- Lithuania (Abu Dhabi)
- Luxembourg (Ankara)
- Madagascar (Riyadh)
- Malawi (Kuwait City)
- Mali (Ankara)
- Malta (Kuwait City)
- Marshall Islands (Tokyo)
- Mauritius (Cairo)
- Mexico (Abu Dhabi)
- Moldova (Ankara)
- Monaco (Berlin)
- Mongolia (Ankara)
- Montenegro (Ankara)
- Mozambique (Dubai)
- Myanmar (Cairo)
- Namibia (Cairo)
- Nauru (Bangkok)
- Nepal (Kuwait City)
- New Zealand (Abu Dhabi)
- Niger (Ankara)
- Nigeria (Amman)
- North Korea (Cairo)
- North Macedonia (Ankara)
- Norway (Amman)
- Palau (Tokyo)
- Panama (Amman)
- Papua New Guinea (New Delhi)
- Paraguay (Ankara)
- Peru (Cairo)
- Portugal (Abu Dhabi)
- Rwanda (Abu Dhabi)
- Saint Kitts and Nevis (Dubai)
- Saint Lucia (London)
- Samoa (Tokyo)
- San Marino (Jakarta)
- Sao Tome and Principe (Libreville)
- Senegal (Ankara)
- Seychelles (Abu Dhabi)
- Sierra Leone (Tehran)
- Singapore (Doha)
- Slovakia (Beirut)
- Slovenia (Ankara)
- Solomon Islands (Jakarta)
- South Africa (Amman)
- South Sudan (Ankara)
- Suriname (Tokyo)
- Tajikistan (Kuwait City)
- Tanzania (Ankara)
- Thailand (Amman)
- Timor-Leste (Kuala Lumpur)
- Togo (Kuwait City)
- Trinidad and Tobago (New Delhi)
- Turkmenistan (Abu Dhabi)
- Tuvalu (Brussels)
- Uganda (Tehran)
- Uruguay (Riyadh)
- Uzbekistan (Kuwait City)
- Vietnam (Tehran)

== Missions to open ==
=== Baghdad ===
- Ireland
- Georgia
- Belgium
- Tanzania
- Turkmenistan
- Tajikistan
- Thailand
- Norway
- Nigeria
- Portugal
- Kenya
- Ethiopia
- Sweden
- Vietnam

=== Mosul ===
- France (Consulate-general)

=== Najaf ===
- Pakistan (Consulate-general)
- Turkey (Consulate-general)

== Closed missions ==
Host city	Sending country	Mission	Year closed	Ref.
Baghdad	Argentina	Embassy (Note: Resident in Tehran, Iran)	1992	
Baghdad	Belgium	Embassy (Note: Resident in Amman, Jordan)	Unknown	
Baghdad	Belarus	Embassy (Note: Resident in Ankara, Turkey)	2017	
Baghdad	Cyprus	Embassy	Unknown	
Baghdad	Denmark	Embassy	2024	
Baghdad	Ethiopia	Embassy (Note: Resident in Kuwait City, Al Asimah, Kuwait)	Unknown	
Baghdad	Georgia	Embassy	Unknown	
Baghdad	Ireland	Embassy	1990	
Baghdad	Kazakhstan	Embassy	2003	
Baghdad	Mexico	Embassy (Note: Resident in Abu Dhabi, UAE)	1986	
Baghdad	New Zealand	Embassy	2020	
Baghdad	Nigeria	Embassy	Unknown	
Baghdad	Norway	Embassy	Unknown	
Baghdad	Senegal	Embassy	Unknown	
Baghdad	South Africa	Embassy	Unknown	
Baghdad	Sweden	Embassy	2023	
Baghdad	Slovakia	Embassy (Note: Resident in Beirut, Lebanon)	Unknown	
Baghdad	Thailand	Embassy	Unknown	
Baghdad	Tanzania	Embassy	Unknown	
Baghdad	Uzbekistan	Embassy	2003	
Baghdad	Vietnam	Embassy	2018	
Basra	United Kingdom	Consulate	2012	
Basra	United States	Consulate-General	2018	

== See also ==
- Foreign relations of Iraq
- List of diplomatic missions of Iraq
