= Panet House =

Historic building in Ottawa, Canada

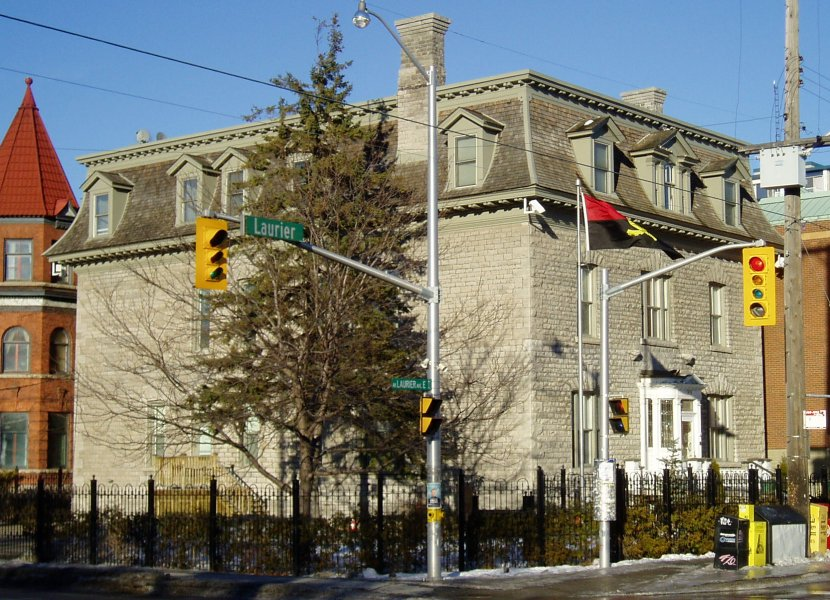
- Panet House in 2005

General information
- Status: Houses the embassy of Iraq in Canada
- Location: 189 Laurier Avenue East, Ottawa, Ontario, Canada
- Coordinates: 45.425625°N 75.682776°W
- Completed: 1877

Panet House is a historic building in Ottawa, Canada. Built by Charles-Eugène Panet, it is located at the corner of Laurier Avenue and King Edward Avenue, near the University of Ottawa. The building currently houses the embassy of Iraq in Canada. From 1998 to 2018, the building served as the embassy of Angola.

== History ==
Panet House was built between 1876 and 1877 for Colonel Charles-Eugène Panet, Deputy Minister of Militia and Defence, at the corner of Laurier Avenue and King Edward Avenue, then called Theodore Street and King Street, respectively. The limestone building featured a mansard roof with decorative cornices. Following Panet's death, his successor as deputy minister, Lieutenant-Colonel L.F. Pineaut, assumed ownership.

In 1915, another owner added on a third storey, replacing the original mansard roof with a flat roof, and the building was converted into a 12-unit apartment building, the Elmscourt Apartments.

The building was expropriated by the City of Ottawa in 1969 when there was talk of demolishing it to make way for the proposed King Edward Expressway from the Macdonald-Cartier Bridge to the Queensway. However, these plans were abandoned in the mid-1970s.

In 1982, the building was again considered for demolition as part of the City's plan to relocate seven fire stations. However, heritage groups objected to this plan and Action Sandy Hill presented a petition with 2,000 signatures at a public meeting in March 1983. The new station was ultimately built across the street. On September 21, 1983, the Ottawa City Council created the King Edward Avenue Heritage Conservation District. In 1986, the district was amended to include Panet House, protecting it under the Ontario Heritage Act.

In 1987, the building was sold to Andrex Holdings Ltd., which restored it, rebuilding its mansard roof and converting its first two floors into office space with six bachelor apartments on its top floor. The project earned the building a heritage award for adaptive reuse from the City in 1989. Following its restoration, the building was sold to a group of four national arts organizations – the Canadian Crafts Council, the Canadian Artists' Representation, the Canadian Music Council, and the Canadian Conference of the Arts – which used it as their headquarters.

The building was purchased by the Republic of Angola in May 1998 and converted into an embassy. The embassy was closed in 2018.

Panet House currently houses the embassy of Iraq in Canada.

== Architecture and style ==
The building was designed in the Second Empire style, and features a mansard roof with dormers and decorative cornices, limestone cladding, and stone chimneys.

== See also ==
- List of designated heritage properties in Ottawa
