= List of diplomatic missions of Iraq =

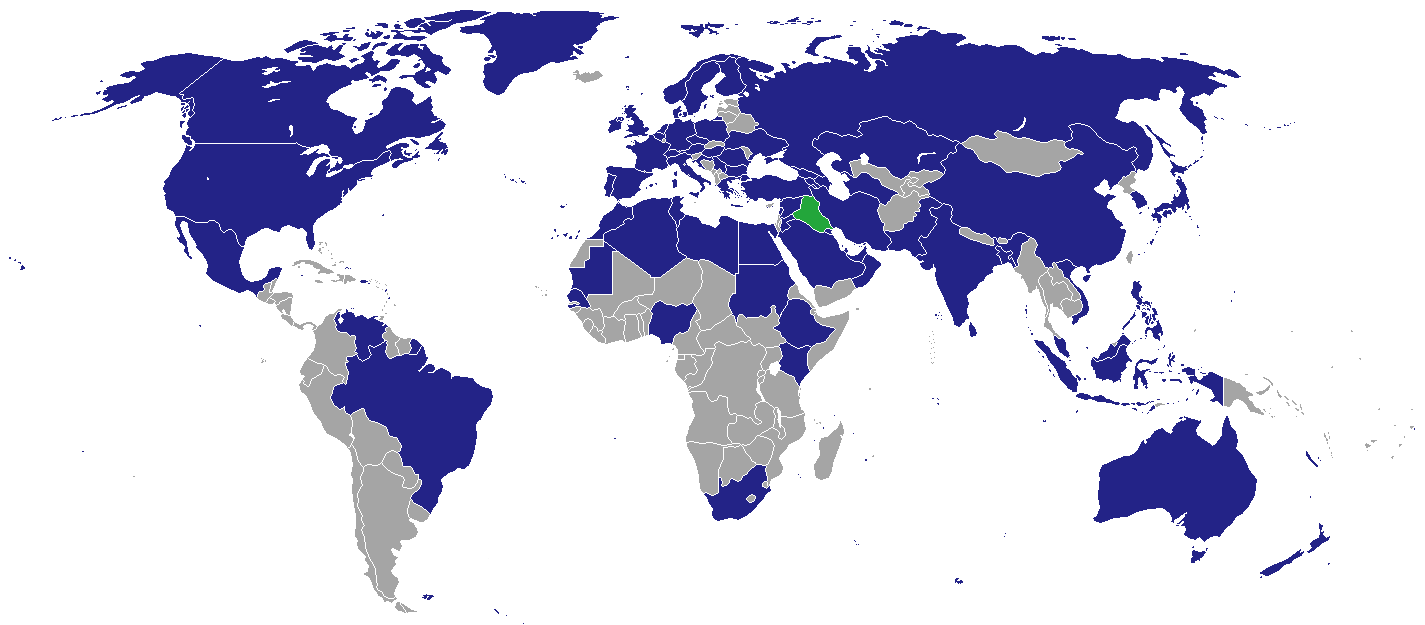
Map of Iraqi diplomatic missions

This is a list of diplomatic missions of Iraq. Iraq maintains a network of diplomatic missions abroad. While the country has re-opened its missions in Washington, London, Tehran and the capitals of other states it was previously hostile to, Iraq does not have diplomatic relations with Israel.

Honorary consulates are excluded from this listing.

== Current missions ==
=== Africa ===
| Host country | Host city | Mission | Concurrent accreditation | Ref. |
|---|---|---|---|---|
| Algeria | Algiers | Embassy | | |
| Egypt | Cairo | Embassy | Multilateral Organizations: Arab League | |
| Ethiopia | Addis Ababa | Embassy | | |
| Kenya | Nairobi | Embassy | Countries: Mauritius; Multilateral organizations: United Nations; United Nations Environment Programme; United Nations Human Settlements Programme | |
| Libya | Tripoli | Embassy | | |
| Mauritania | Nouakchott | Embassy | | |
| Morocco | Rabat | Embassy | | |
| Nigeria | Abuja | Embassy | | |
| Senegal | Dakar | Embassy | | |
| South Africa | Pretoria | Embassy | | |
| Sudan | Khartoum | Embassy | | |
| Tunisia | Tunis | Embassy | | |

=== Americas ===
| Host country | Host city | Mission | Concurrent accreditation | Ref. |
|---|---|---|---|---|
| Brazil | Brasília | Embassy | | |
| Canada | Ottawa | Embassy | | |
| Canada | Montreal | Consulate-General | | |
| Canada | Toronto | Consulate-General | | |
| Mexico | Mexico City | Embassy | Countries: Guatemala | |
| United States | Washington, D.C. | Embassy | | |
| United States | Detroit | Consulate-General | | |
| United States | Houston | Consulate-General | | |
| United States | Los Angeles | Consulate-General | | |
| Venezuela | Caracas | Embassy | Countries: Cuba; Colombia; Peru; Trinidad and Tobago | |

=== Asia ===
| Host country | Host city | Mission | Concurrent accreditation | Ref. |
|---|---|---|---|---|
| Armenia | Yerevan | Embassy | | |
| Azerbaijan | Baku | Embassy | | |
| Bahrain | Manama | Embassy | | |
| Bangladesh | Dhaka | Embassy | | |
| China | Beijing | Embassy | | |
| China | Guangzhou | Consulate-General | | |
| Georgia | Tbilisi | Embassy | | |
| India | New Delhi | Embassy | Countries: Nepal | |
| India | Mumbai | Consulate-General | Countries: Nepal | |
| Indonesia | Jakarta | Embassy | Countries: Singapore; Multilateral organizations: Association of Southeast Asian Nations | |
| Iran | Tehran | Embassy | | |
| Iran | Ahvaz | Consulate-General | | |
| Iran | Isfahan | Consulate-General | | |
| Iran | Kermanshah | Consulate-General | | |
| Iran | Mashhad | Consulate-General | | |
| Japan | Tokyo | Embassy | | |
| Jordan | Amman | Embassy | Countries: Palestine | |
| Kazakhstan | Astana | Embassy | Countries: Kyrgyzstan; Tajikistan; Uzbekistan | |
| Kuwait | Kuwait City | Embassy | | |
| Lebanon | Beirut | Embassy | | |
| Malaysia | Kuala Lumpur | Embassy | Countries: Brunei; Thailand | |
| Oman | Muscat | Embassy | Countries: Yemen | |
| Pakistan | Islamabad | Embassy | | |
| Pakistan | Karachi | Consulate-General | | |
| Philippines | Manila | Embassy | | |
| Qatar | Doha | Embassy | | |
| Saudi Arabia | Riyadh | Embassy | | |
| Saudi Arabia | Jeddah | Consulate-General | | |
| South Korea | Seoul | Embassy | | |
| Sri Lanka | Colombo | Embassy | Countries: Maldives | |
| Syria | Damascus | Embassy | | |
| Turkey | Ankara | Embassy | | |
| Turkey | Gaziantep | Consulate-General | | |
| Turkey | Istanbul | Consulate-General | | |
| Turkmenistan | Ashgabat | Embassy | | |
| United Arab Emirates | Abu Dhabi | Embassy | Multilateral organizations: International Renewable Energy Agency | |
| United Arab Emirates | Dubai | Consulate-General | Multilateral organizations: International Renewable Energy Agency | |
| Vietnam | Hanoi | Embassy | Countries: Cambodia | |

=== Europe ===
| Host country | Host city | Mission | Concurrent accreditation | Ref. |
|---|---|---|---|---|
| Austria | Vienna | Embassy | Countries: Slovenia; Slovakia; Multilateral Organizations: United Nations | |
| Belgium | Brussels | Embassy | Countries: Luxembourg; Multilateral organizations: European Union | |
| Bulgaria | Sofia | Embassy | Countries: Albania | |
| Croatia | Zagreb | Embassy | | |
| Czech Republic | Prague | Embassy | | |
| Denmark | Copenhagen | Embassy | | |
| Finland | Helsinki | Embassy | Countries: Estonia | |
| France | Paris | Embassy | | |
| France | Cannes | Consulate-General | | |
| Germany | Berlin | Embassy | | |
| Germany | Frankfurt | Consulate-General | | |
| Greece | Athens | Embassy | Countries: Cyprus | |
| Holy See (Note: The Iraqi Embassy to the Holy See is located outside Vatican territory in Rome.) | Rome | Embassy | | |
| Hungary | Budapest | Embassy | | |
| Ireland | Dublin | Embassy | | |
| Italy | Rome | Embassy | Countries: Malta; San Marino; Multilateral organizations: International Fund for Agricultural Development | |
| Netherlands | The Hague | Embassy | International Organizations: Organisation for the Prohibition of Chemical Weapons | |
| Norway | Oslo | Embassy | | |
| Poland | Warsaw | Embassy | Countries: Latvia; Lithuania | |
| Portugal | Lisbon | Embassy | | |
| Romania | Bucharest | Embassy | | |
| Russia | Moscow | Embassy | Countries: Belarus | |
| Serbia | Belgrade | Embassy | Countries: Bosnia and Herzegovina; Montenegro | |
| Spain | Madrid | Embassy | Multilateral Organizations: UN Tourism | |
| Sweden | Stockholm | Embassy | Countries: Iceland | |
| Switzerland | Bern | Embassy | | |
| Ukraine | Kyiv | Embassy | | |
| United Kingdom | London | Embassy | | |
| United Kingdom | Glasgow | Consulate-General | | |
| United Kingdom | Manchester | Consulate-General | | |

=== Oceania ===
| Host country | Host city | Mission | Concurrent accreditation | Ref. |
|---|---|---|---|---|
| Australia | Canberra | Embassy | | |
| Australia | Melbourne | Consulate-General | | |
| Australia | Sydney | Consulate-General | | |
| New Zealand | Wellington | Embassy | | |

=== Multilateral organizations ===
| Organization | Host city | Host country | Mission | Concurrent accreditation | Ref. |
|---|---|---|---|---|---|
| United Nations | New York City | United States | Permanent Mission | | |
| United Nations | Geneva | Switzerland | Permanent Mission | | |
| UNESCO | Paris | France | Permanent Mission | | |

== Gallery ==
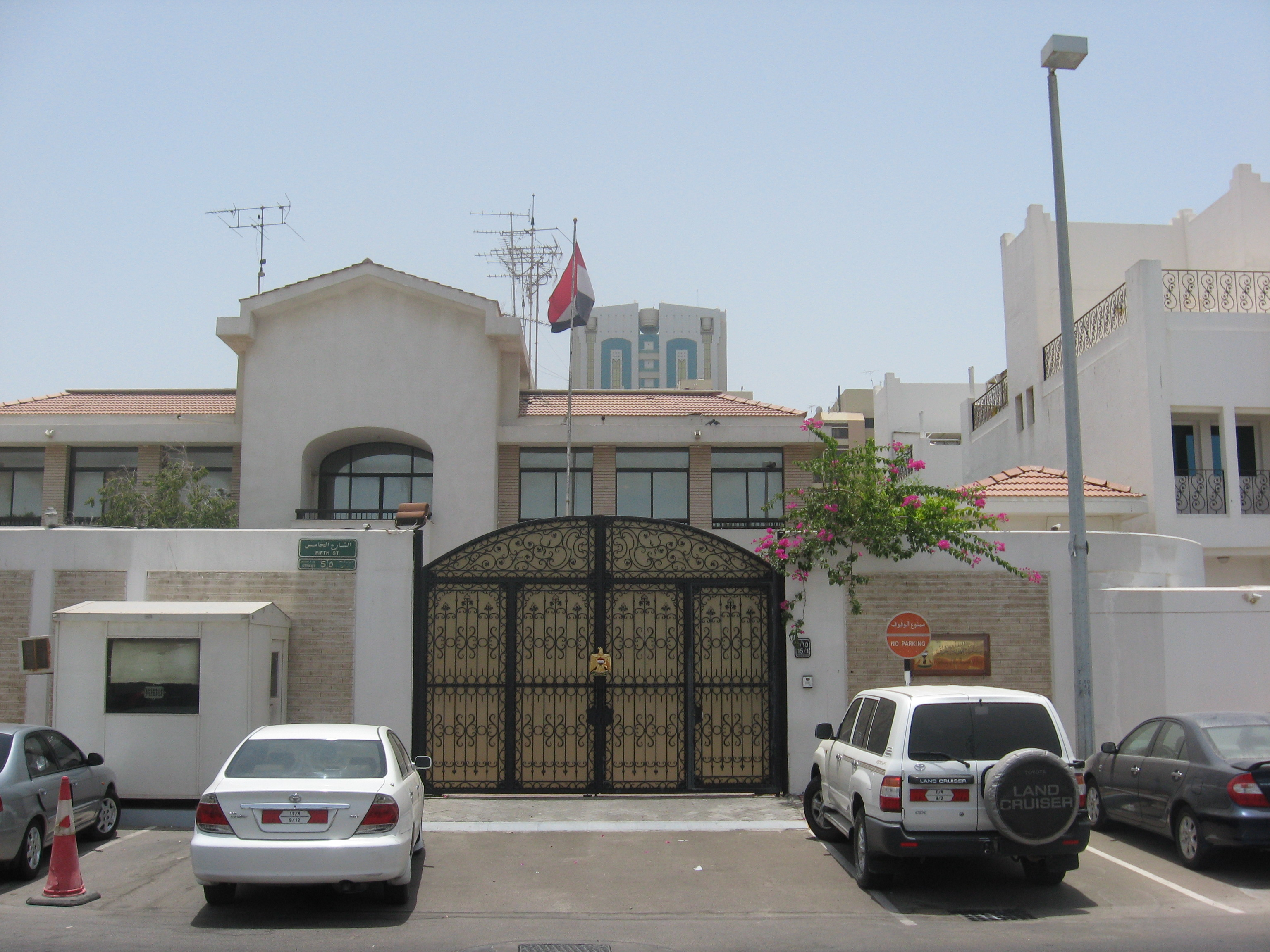
Embassy in Abu Dhabi

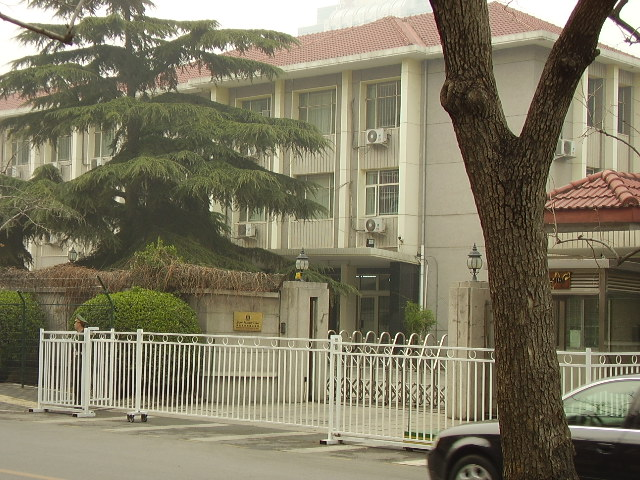
Embassy in Beijing

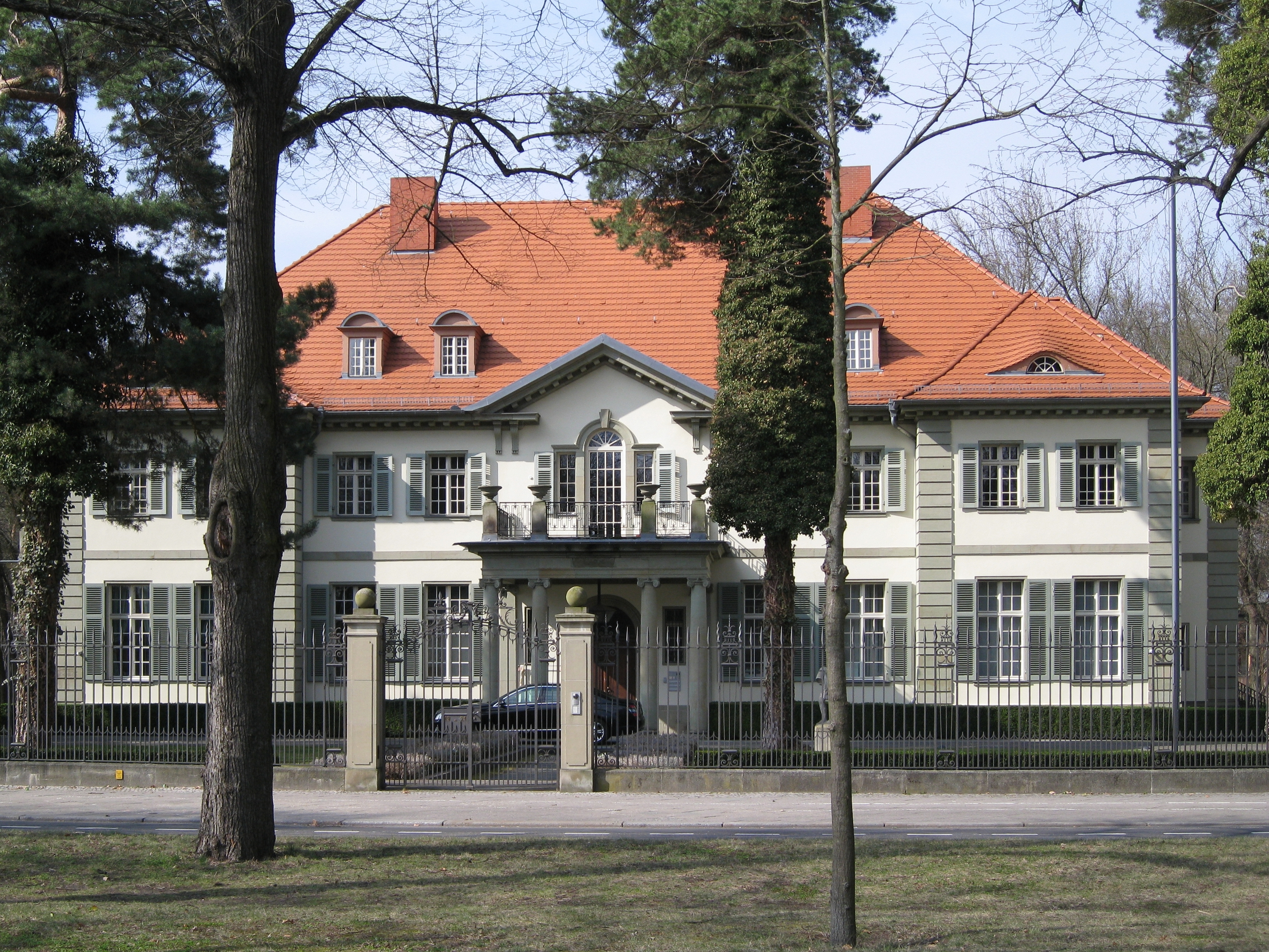
Embassy in Berlin

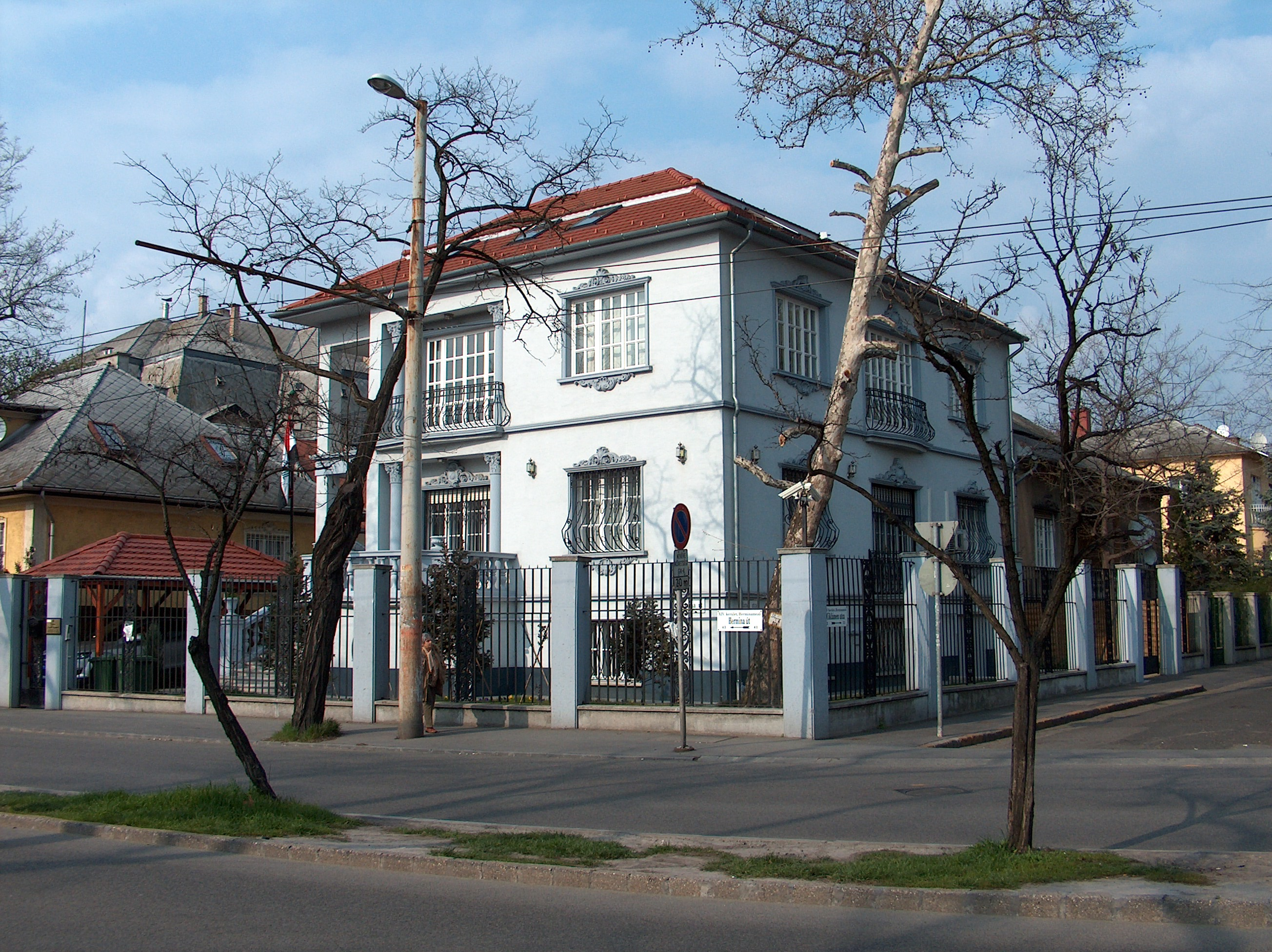
Embassy in Budapest

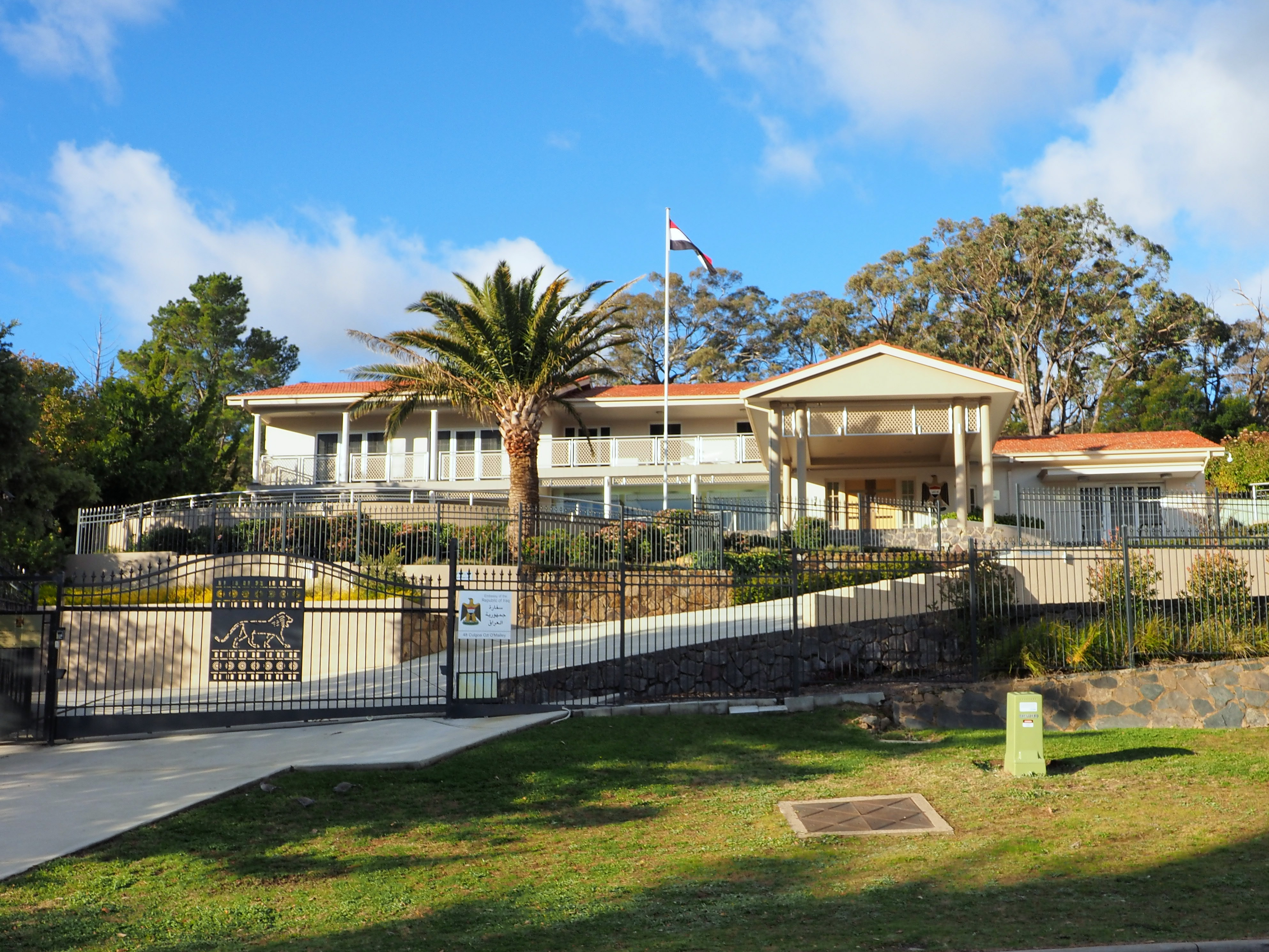
Embassy in Canberra

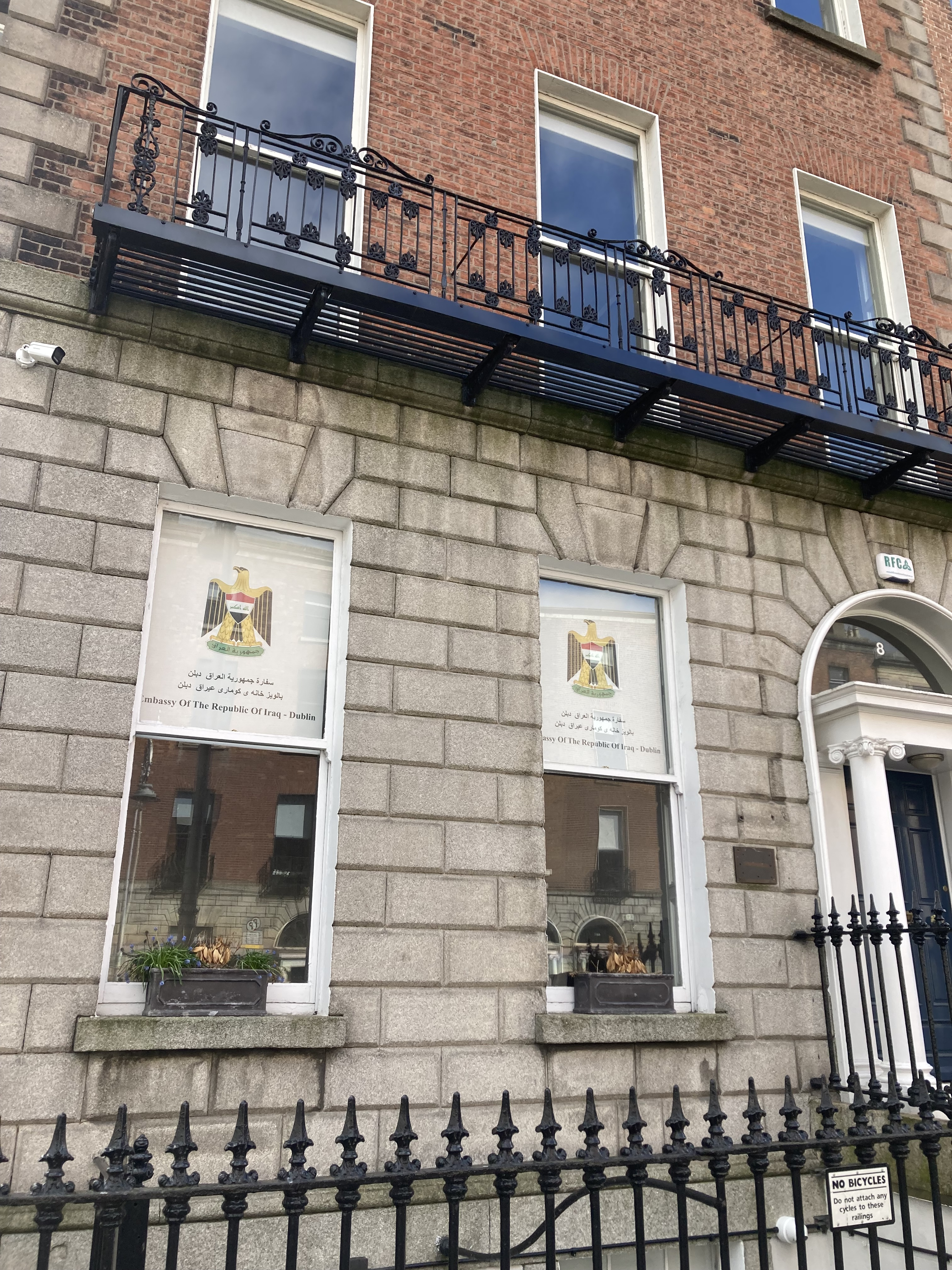
Embassy in Dublin

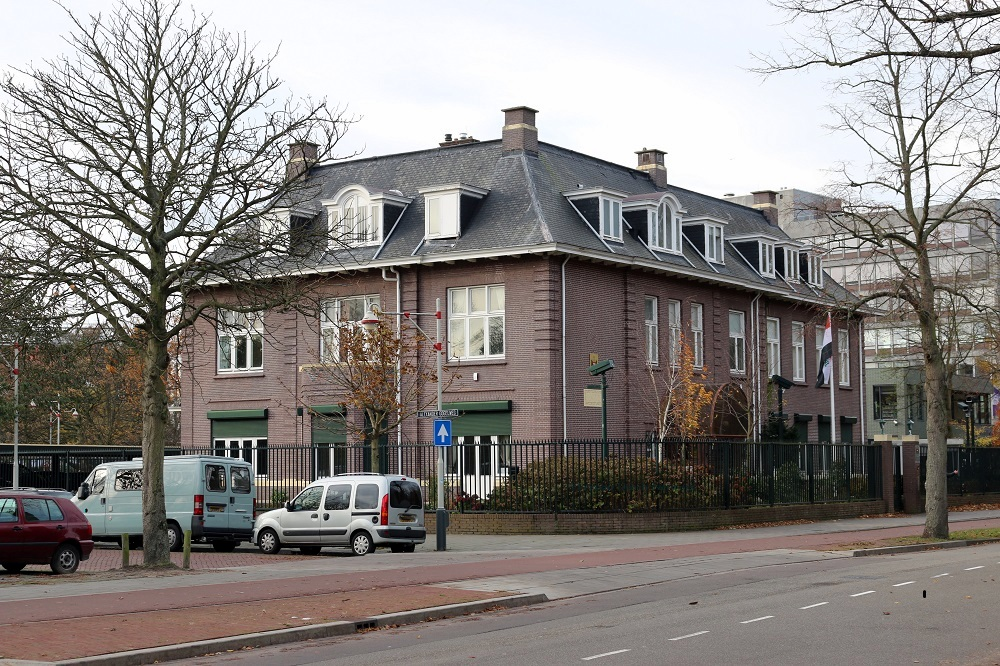
Embassy in The Hague

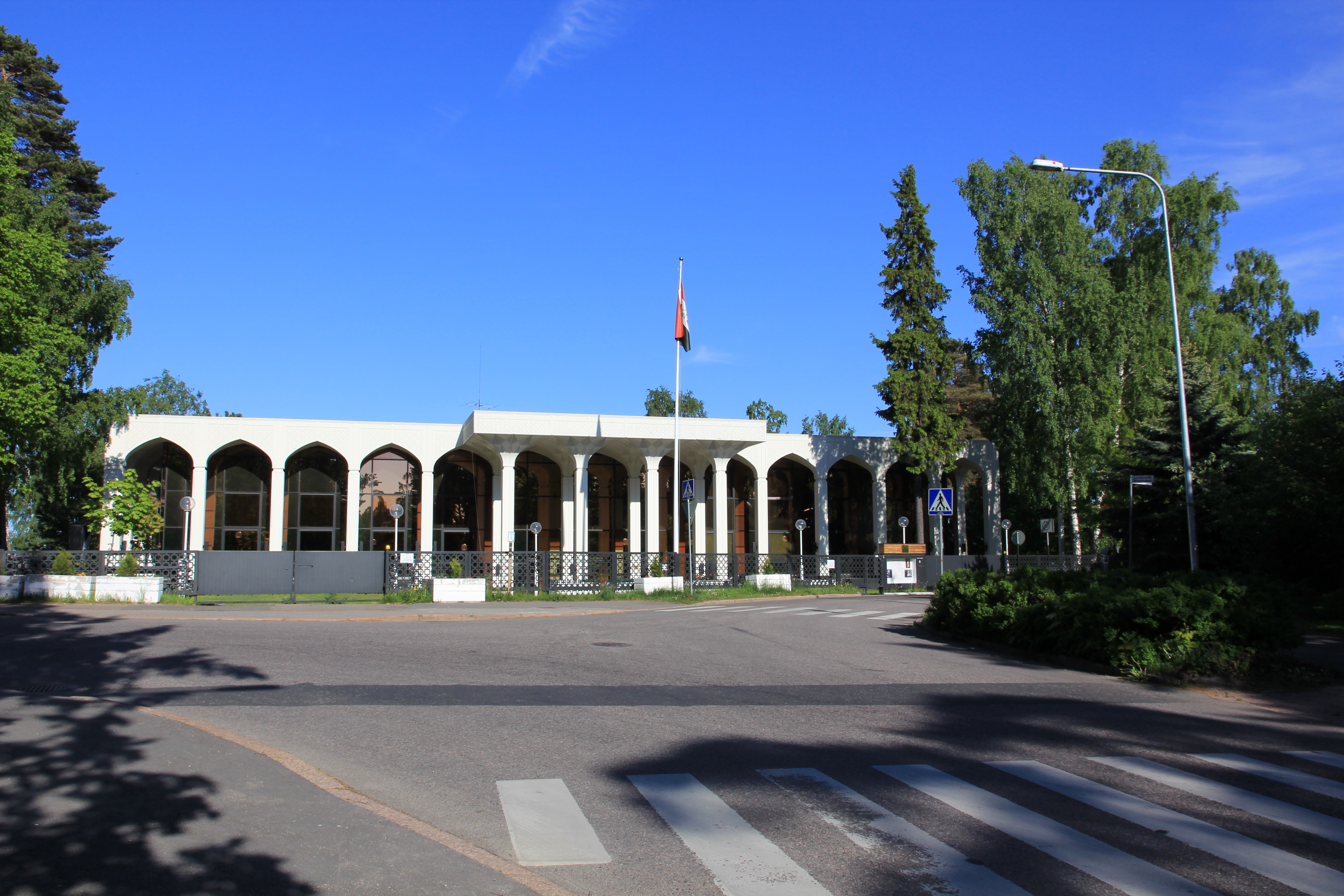
Embassy in Helsinki

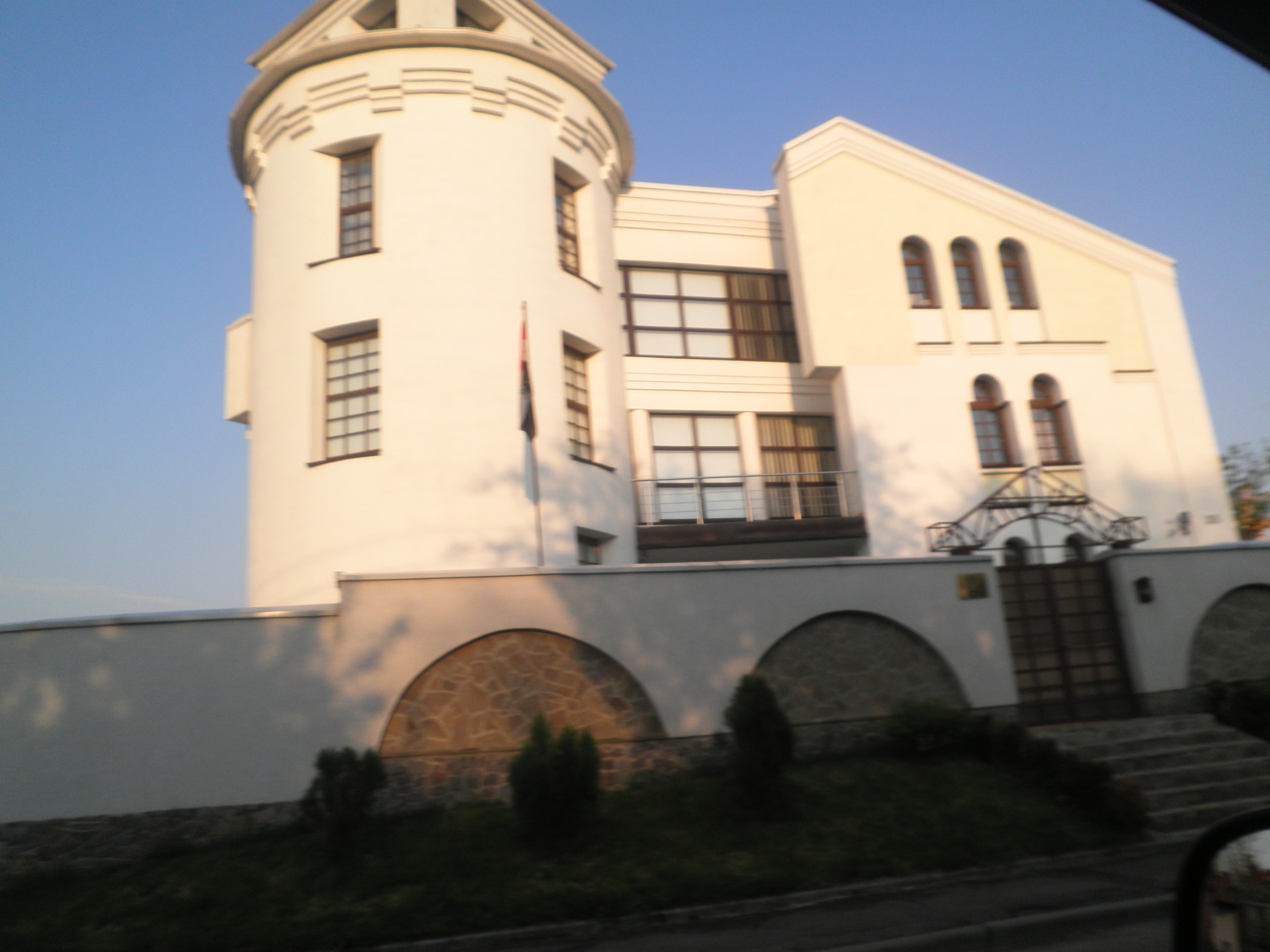
Embassy in Kyiv

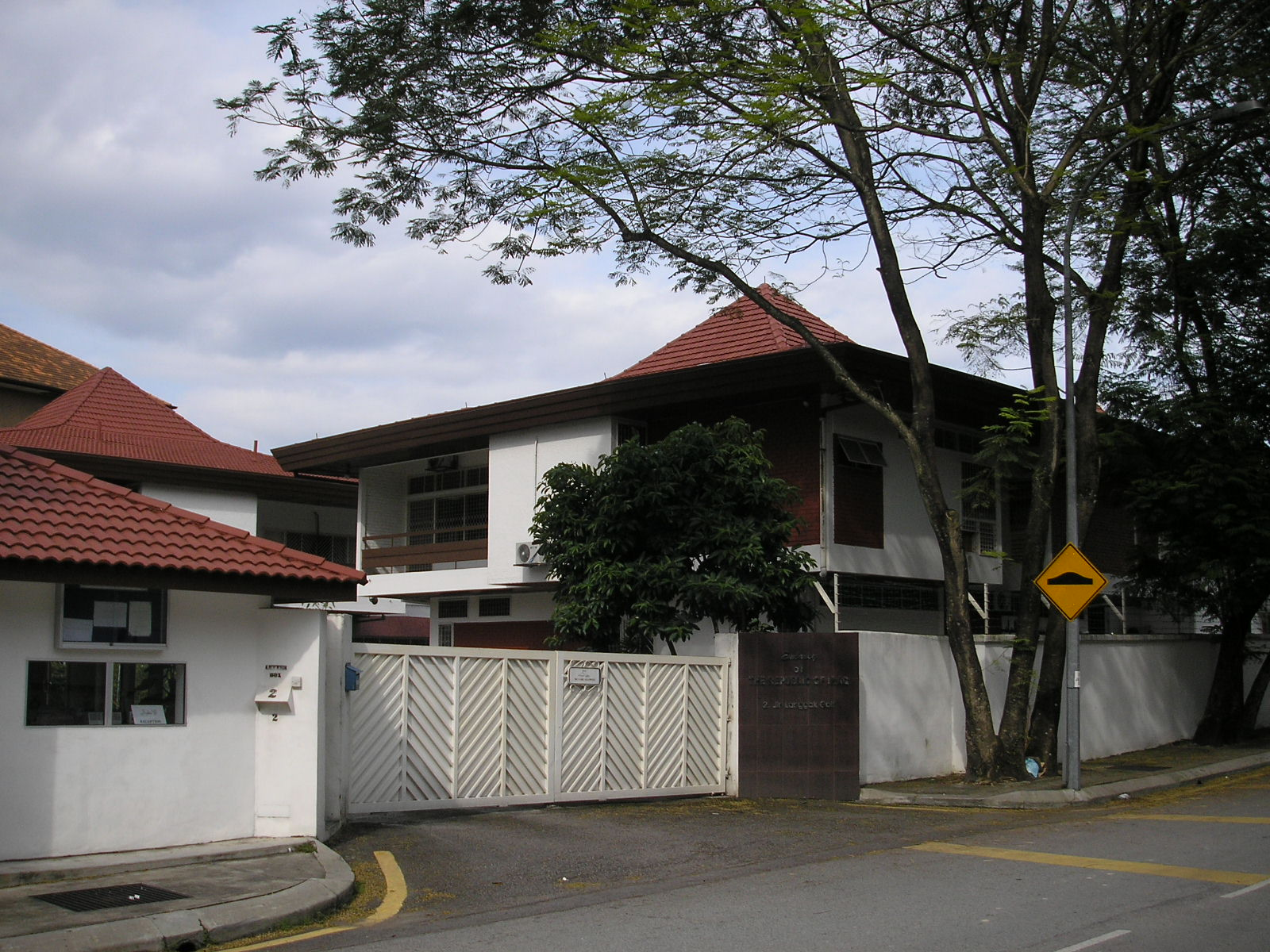
Embassy in Kuala Lumpur

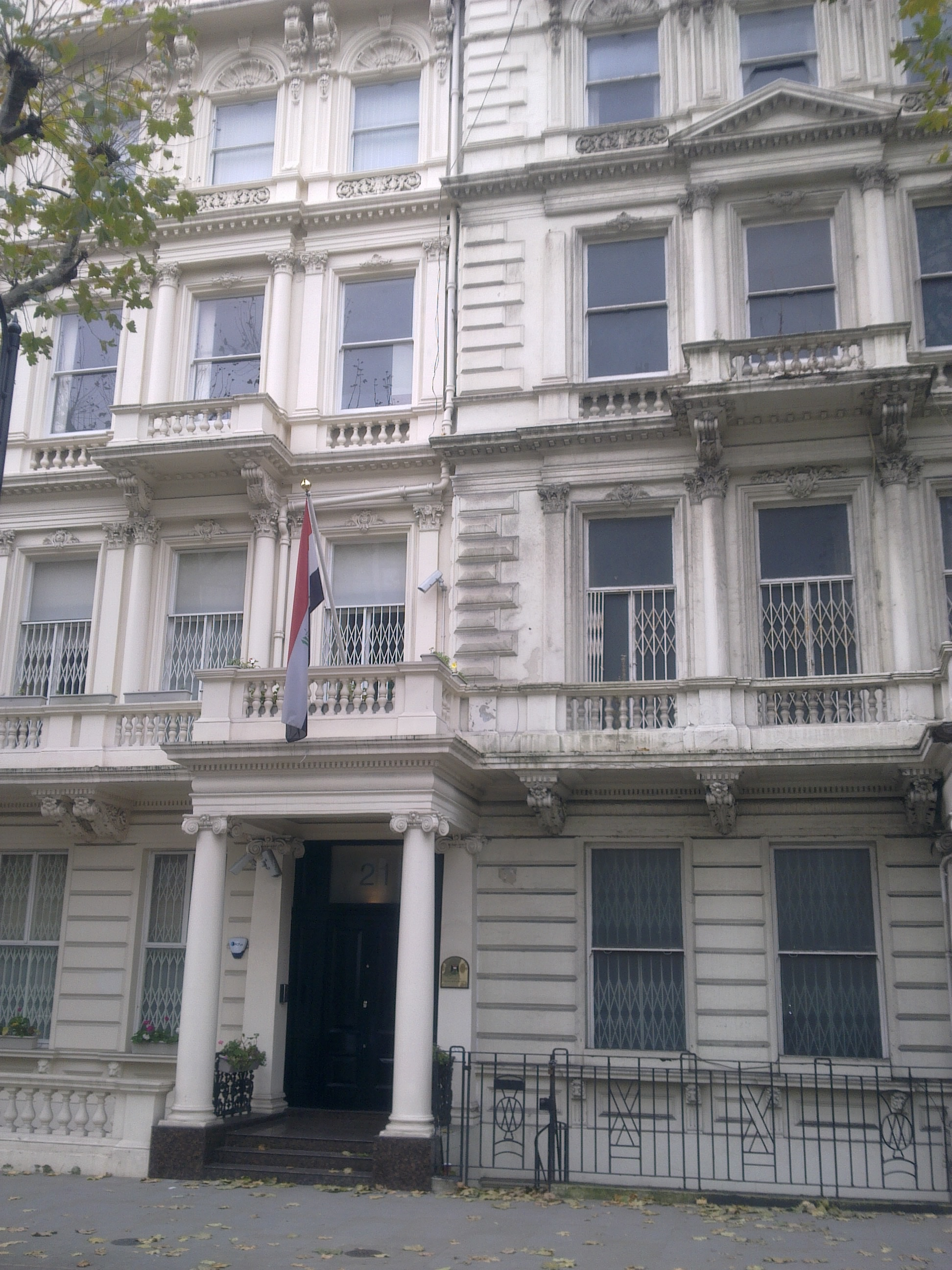
Embassy in London

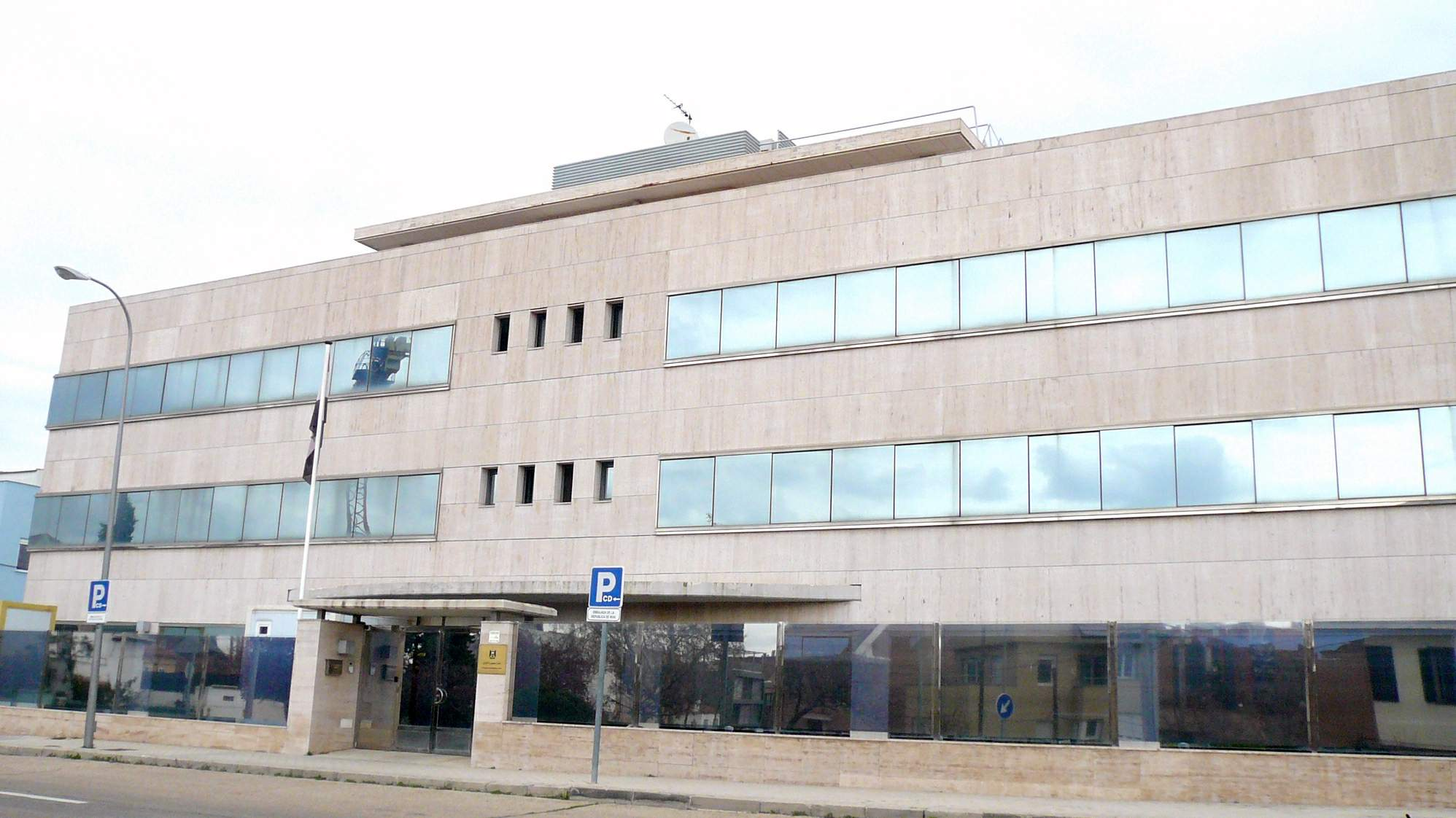
Embassy in Madrid

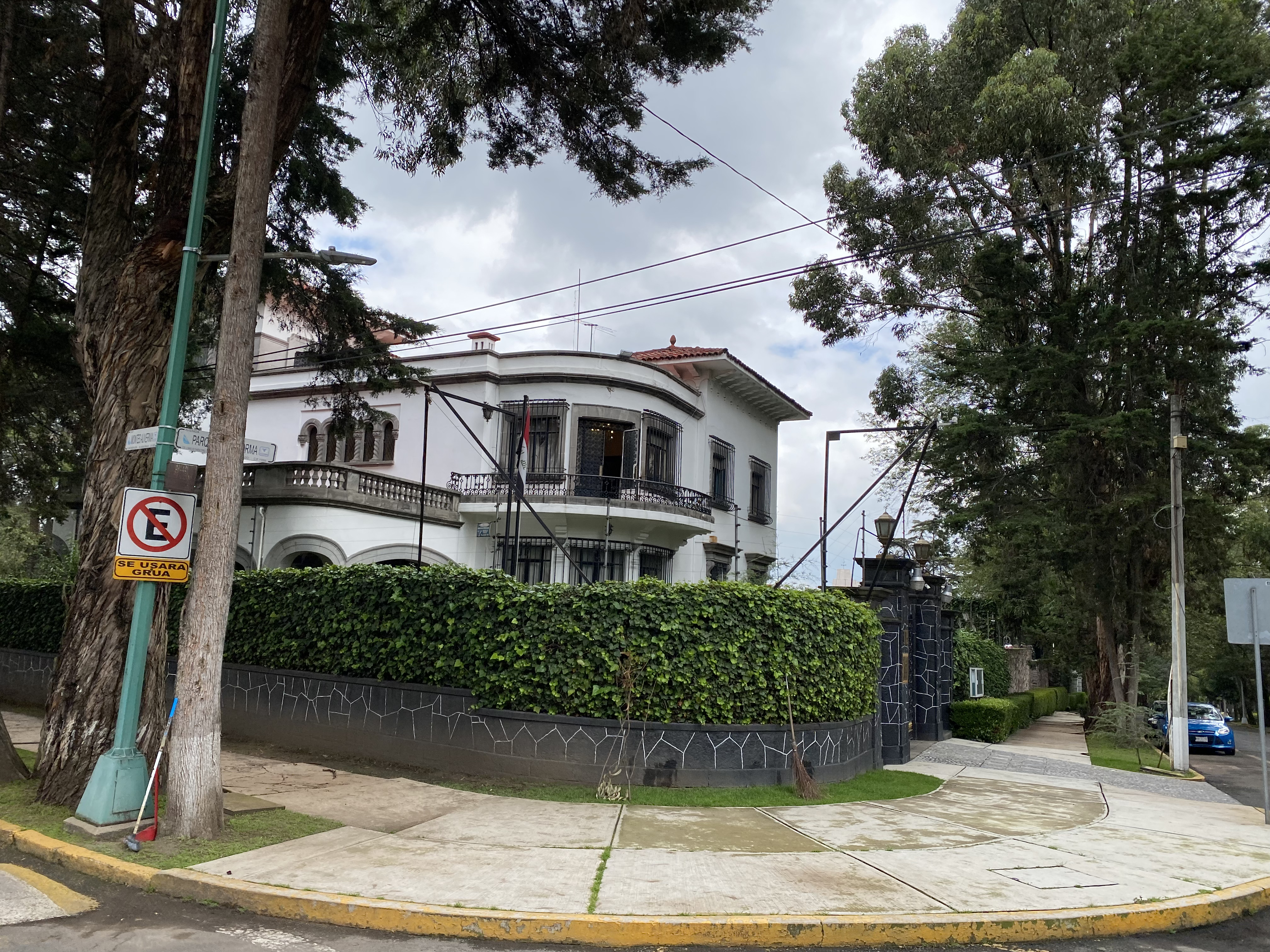
Embassy in Mexico City

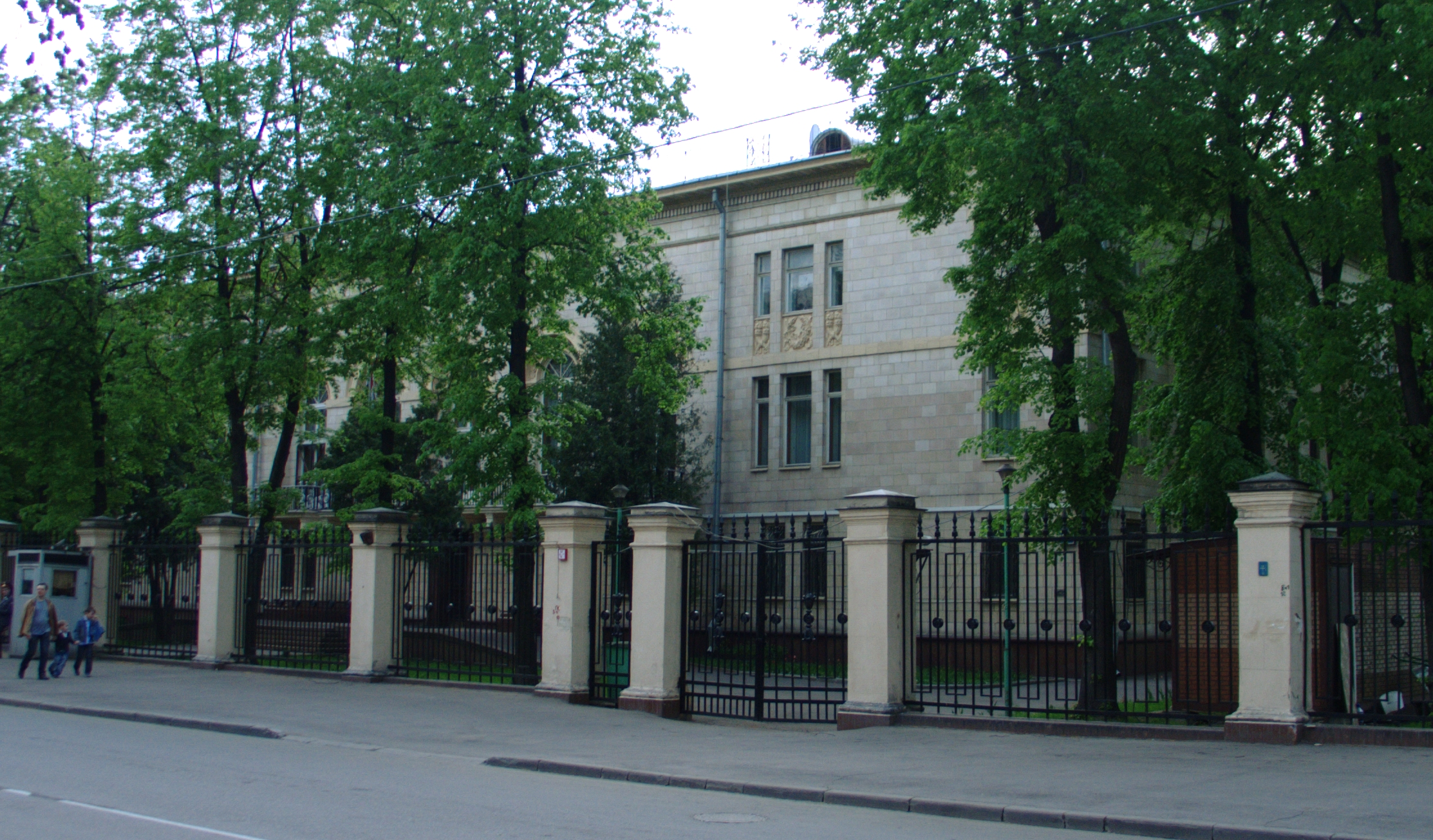
Embassy in Moscow

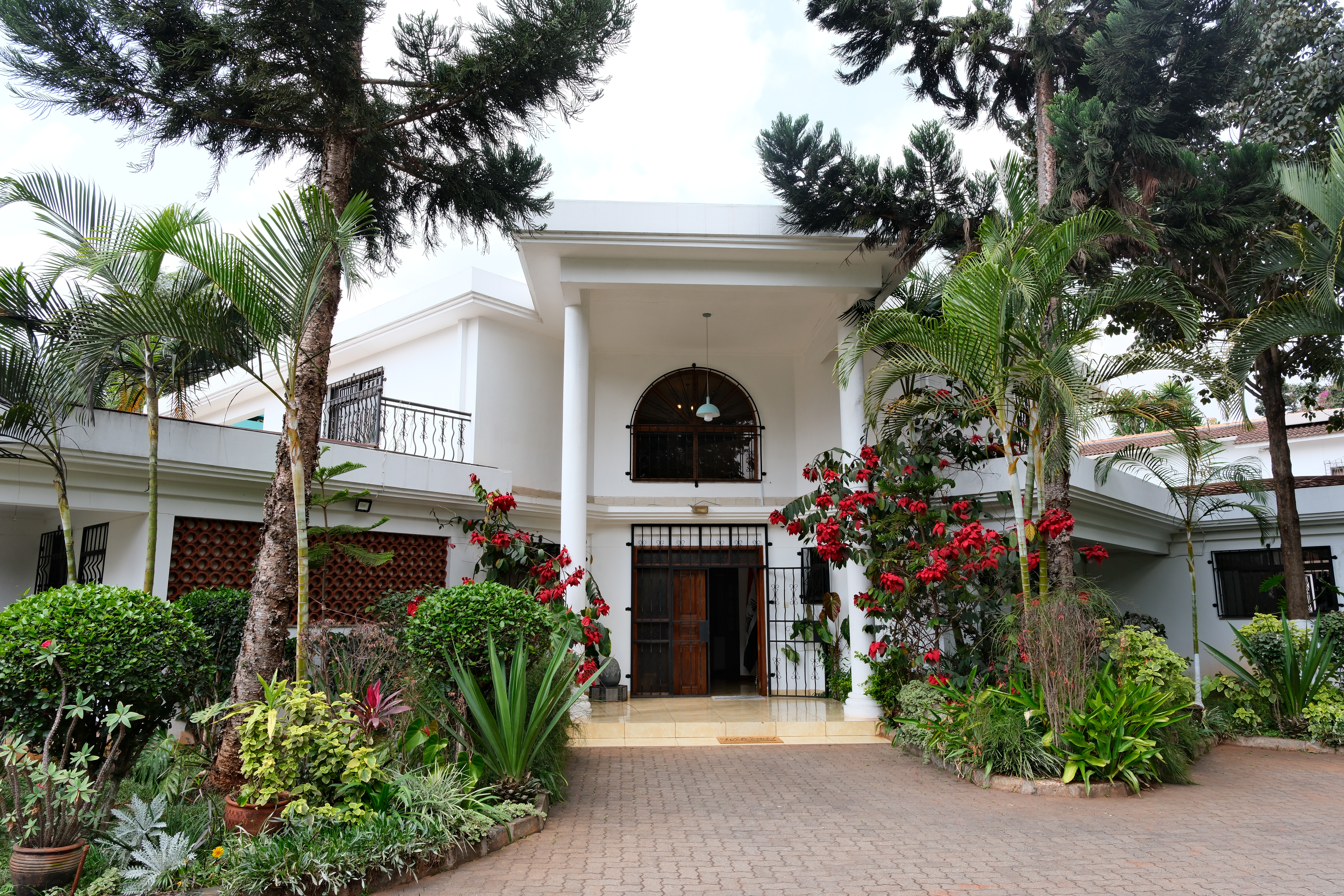
Embassy in Nairobi

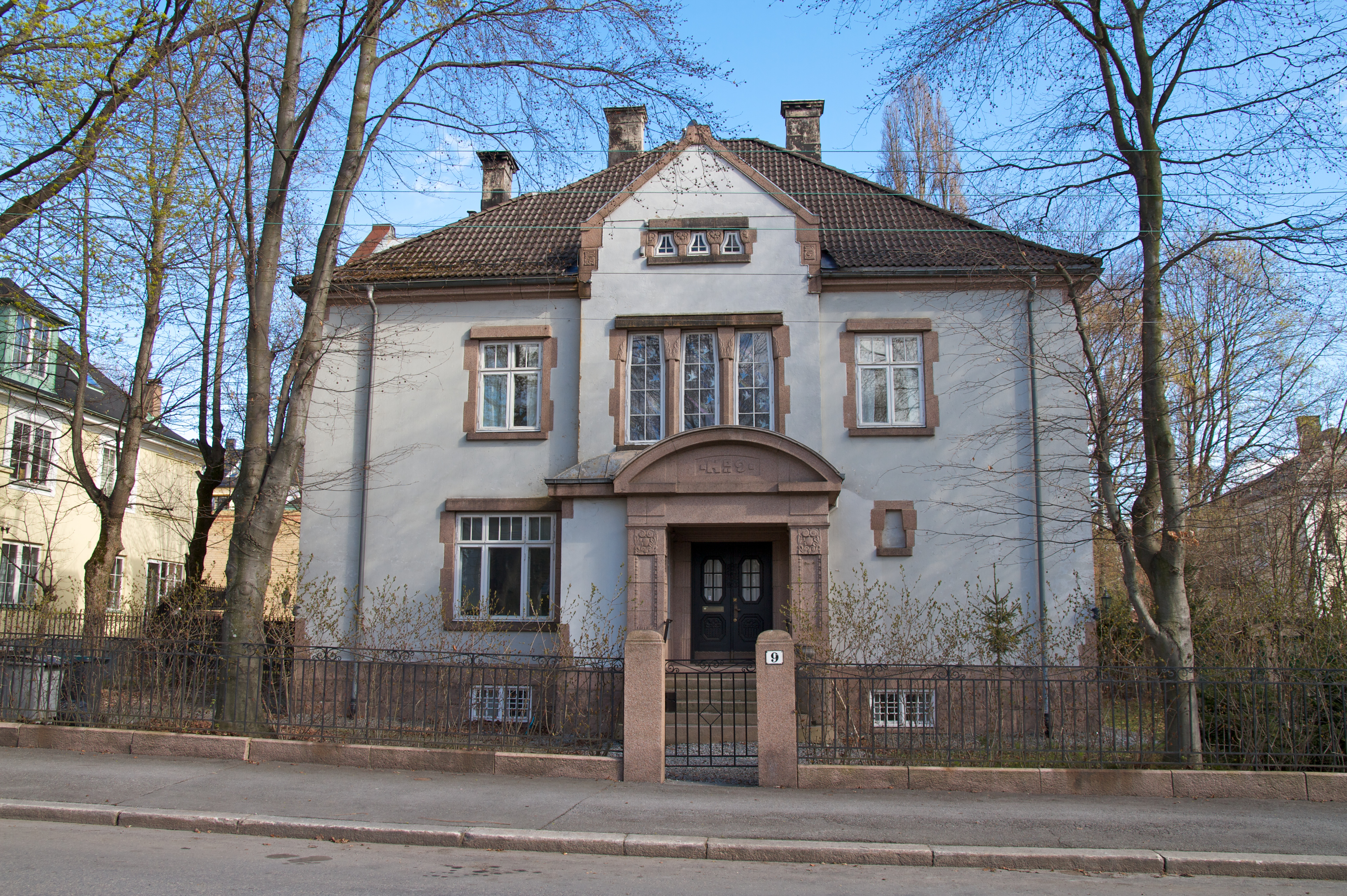
Embassy in Oslo

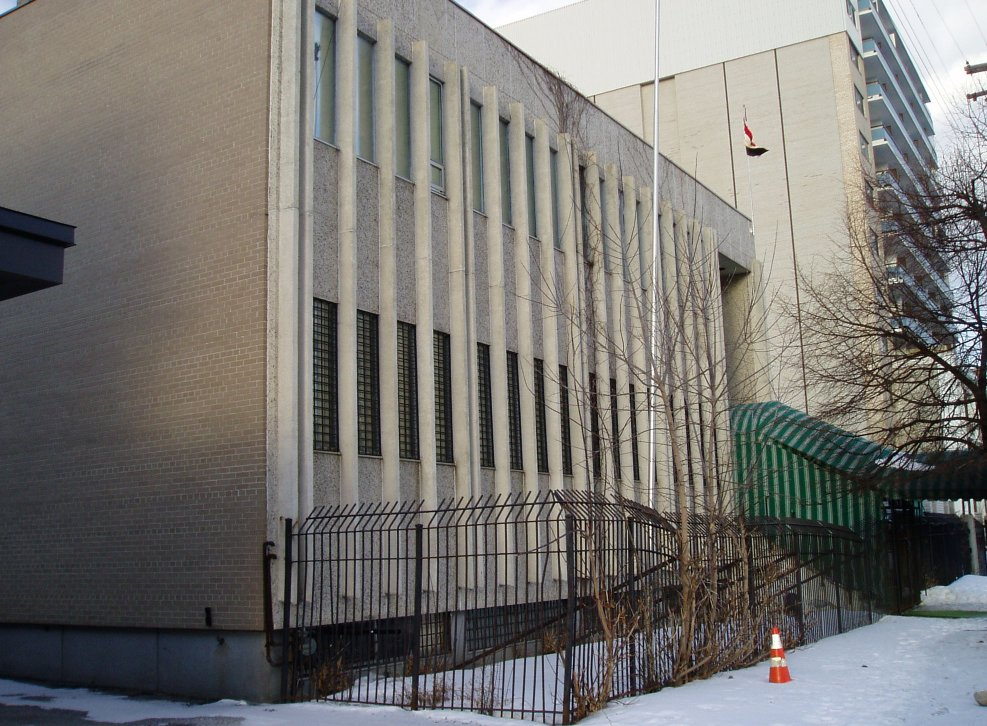
Embassy in Ottawa

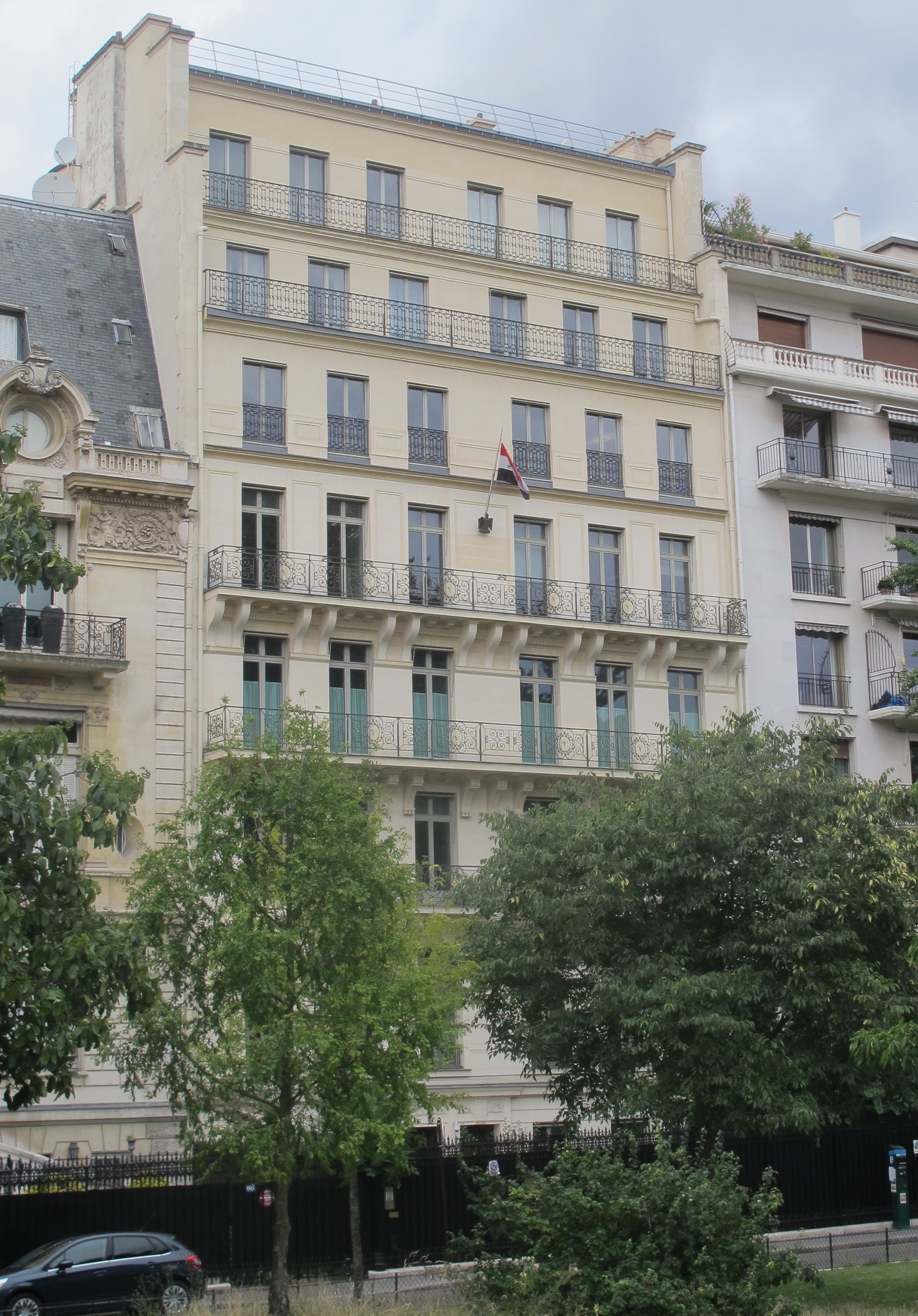
Embassy in Paris

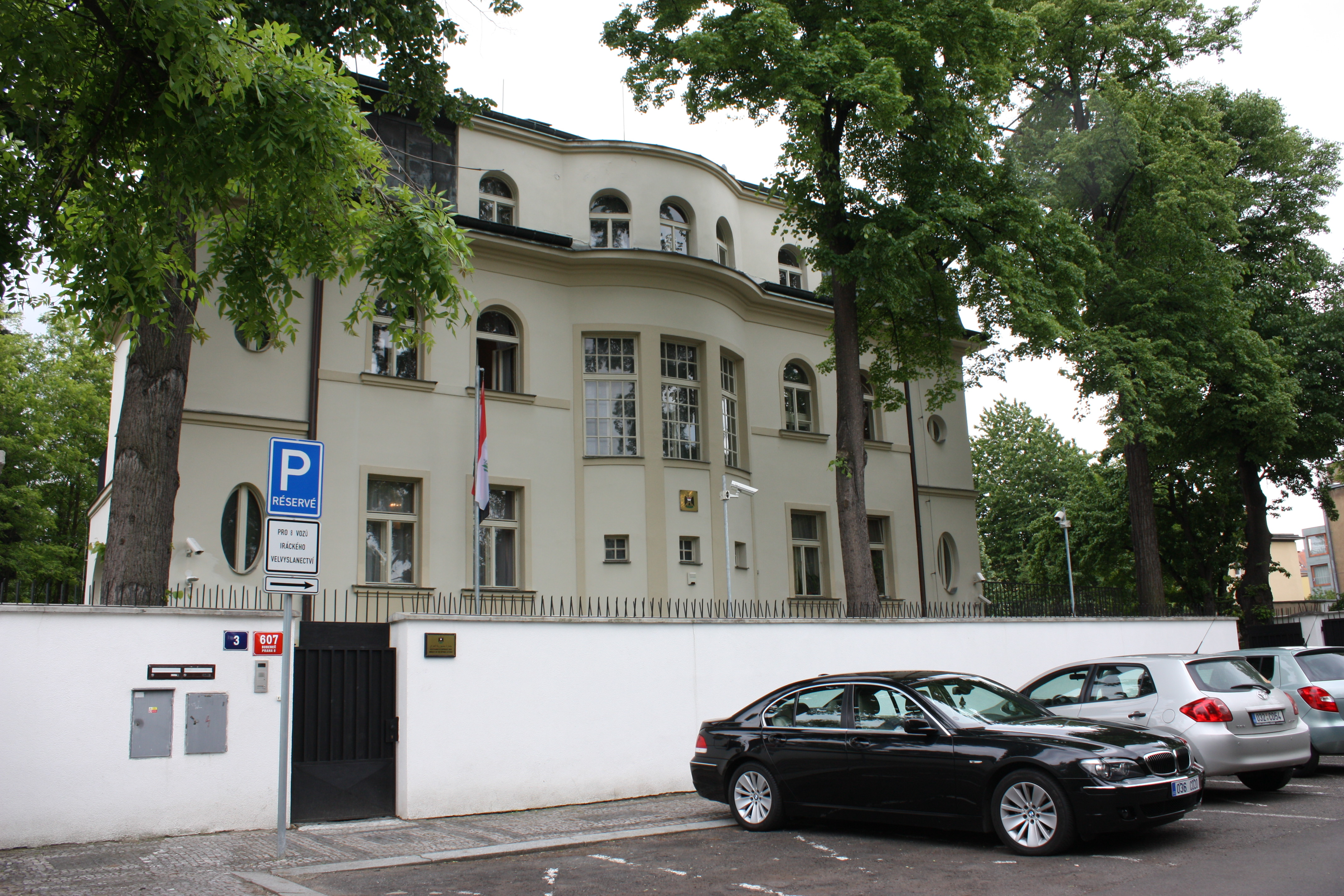
Embassy in Prague

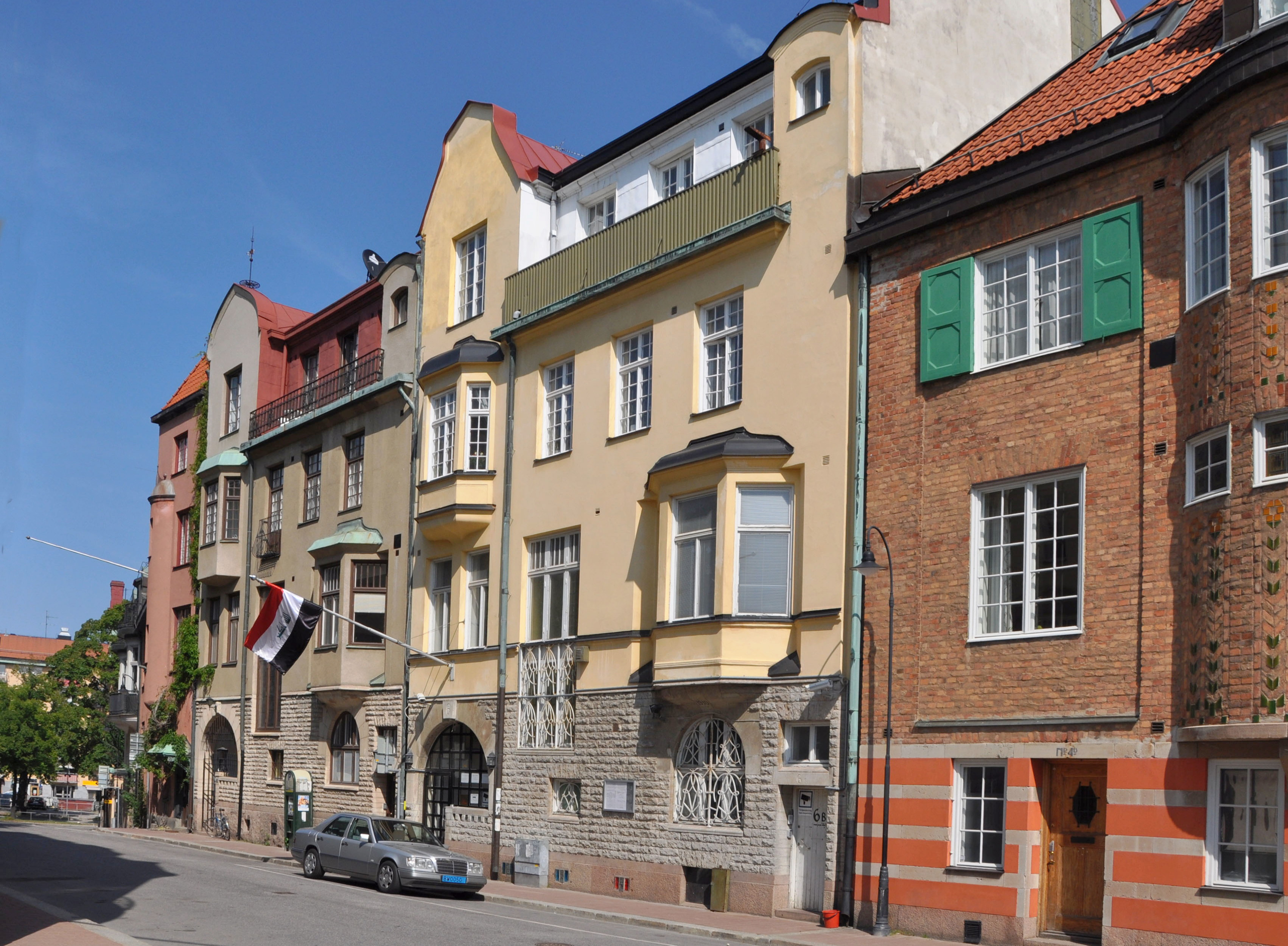
Embassy in Stockholm

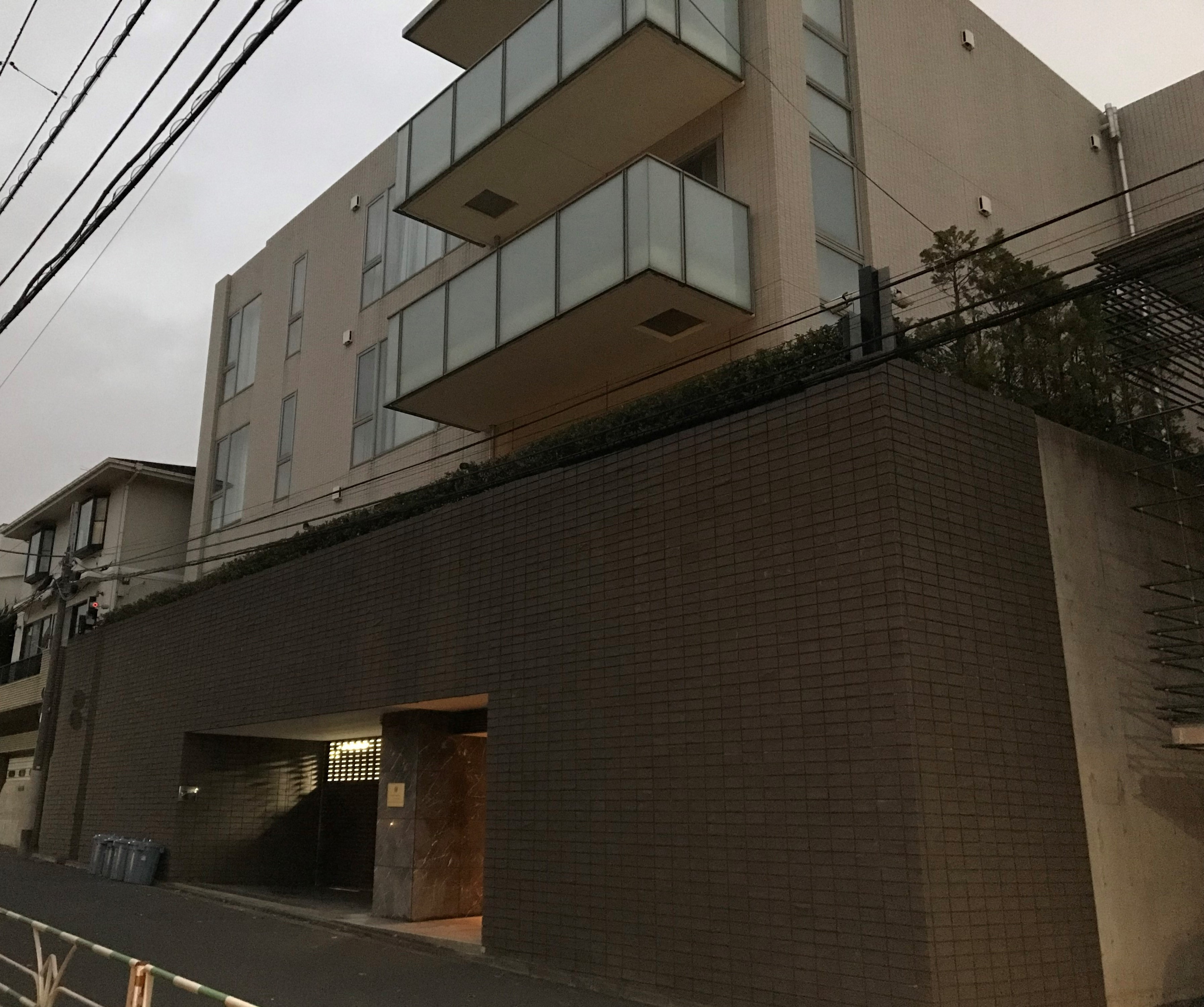
Embassy in Tokyo

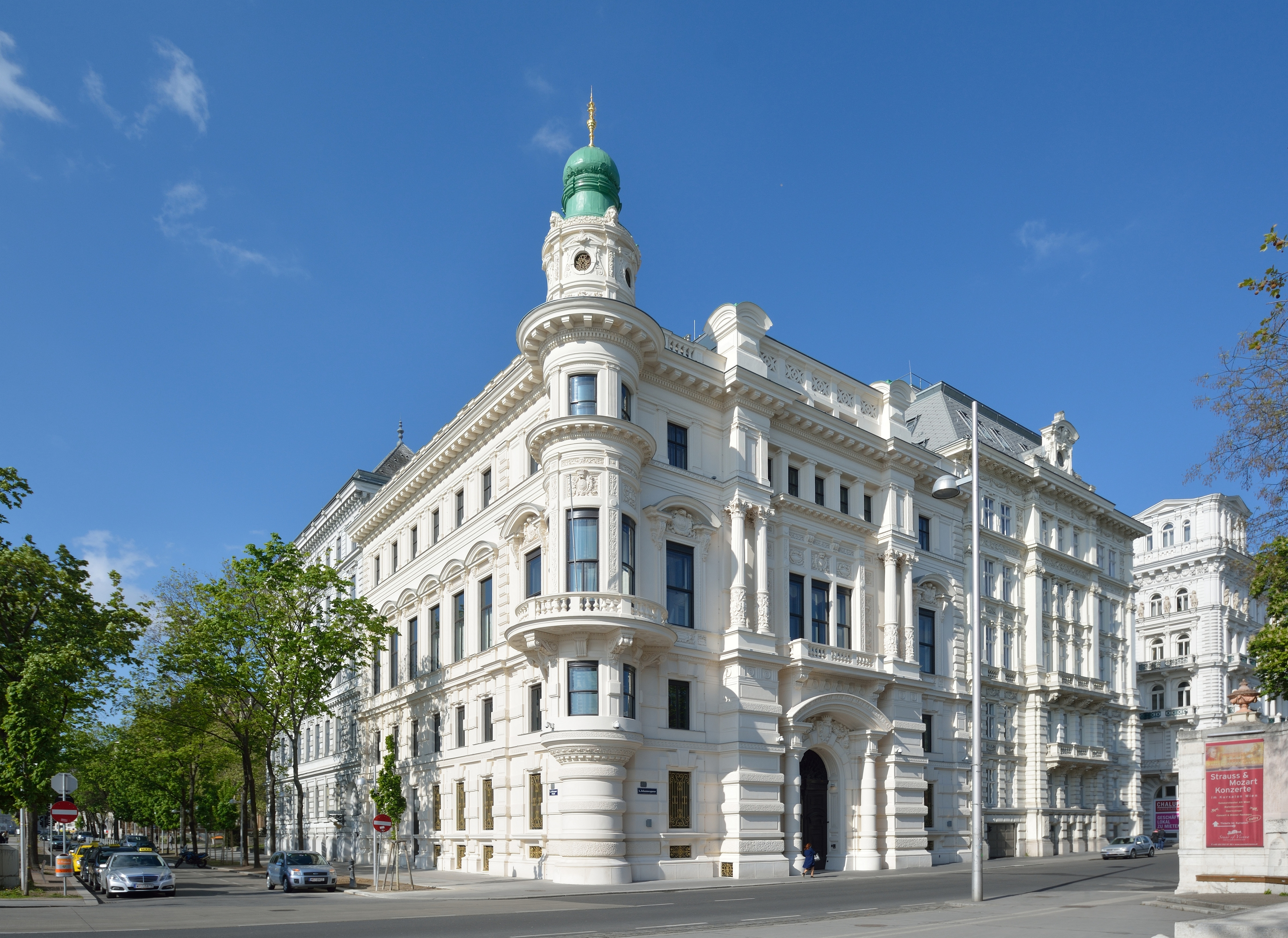
Embassy in Vienna

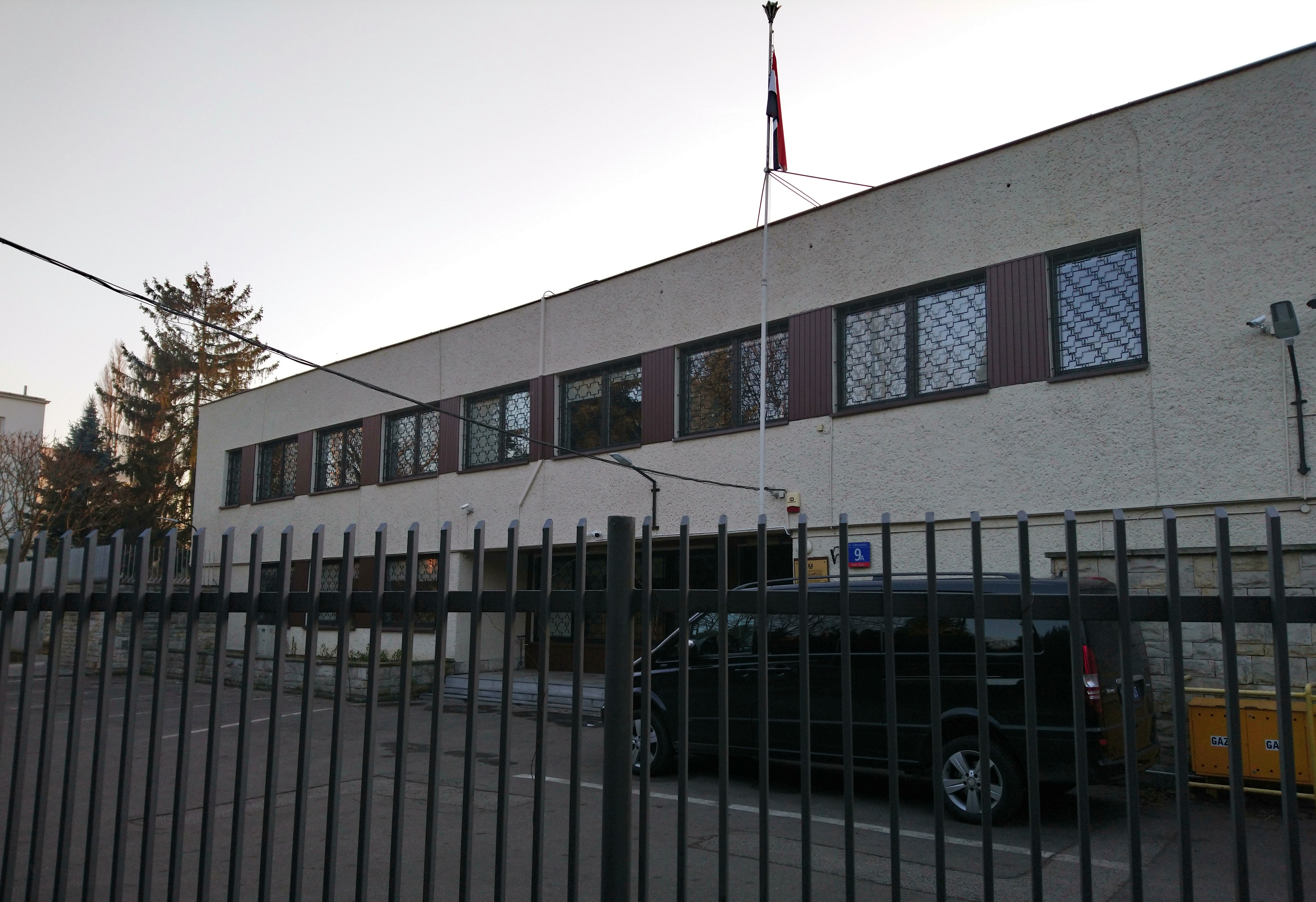
Embassy in Warsaw

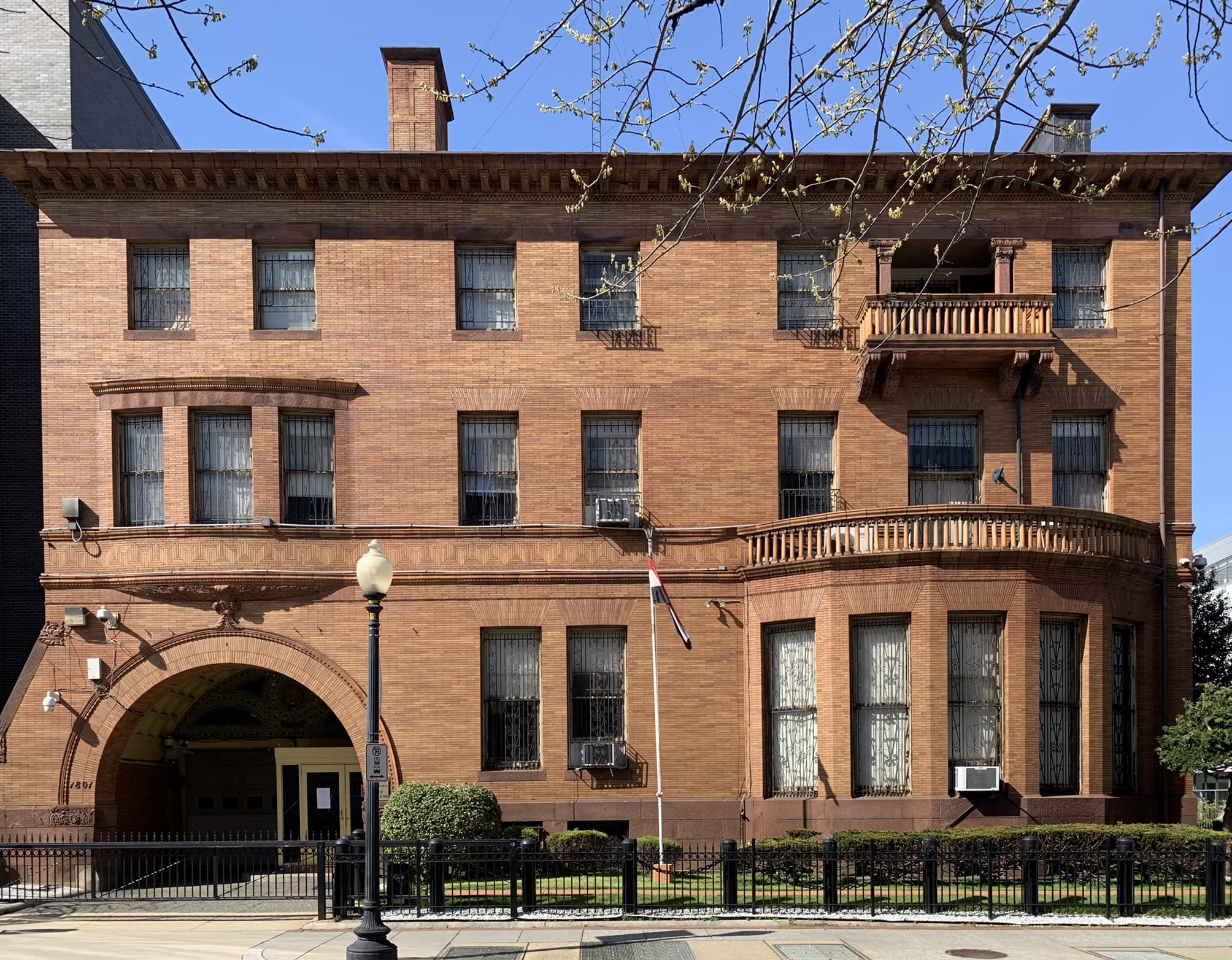
Embassy in Washington, D.C.

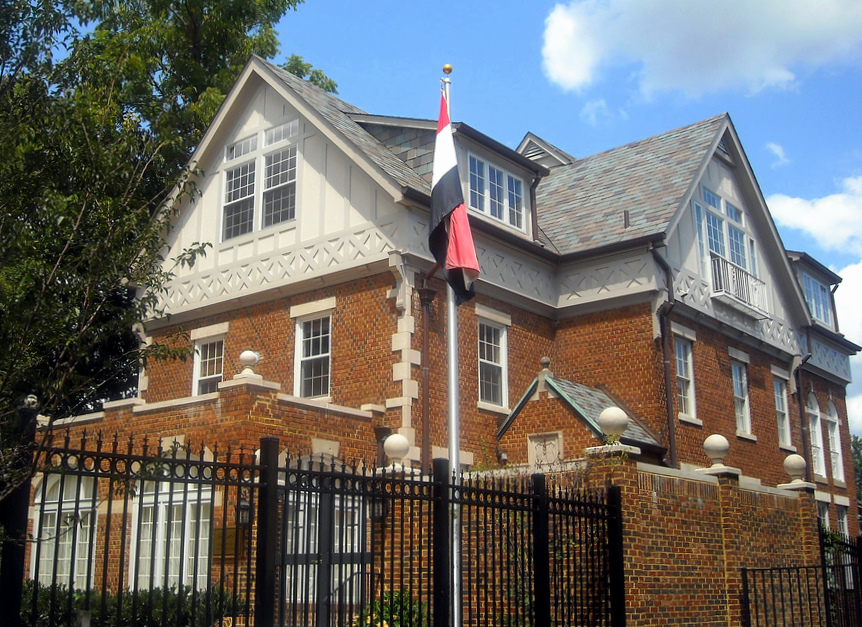
Consular section of the Embassy in Washington. D.C.

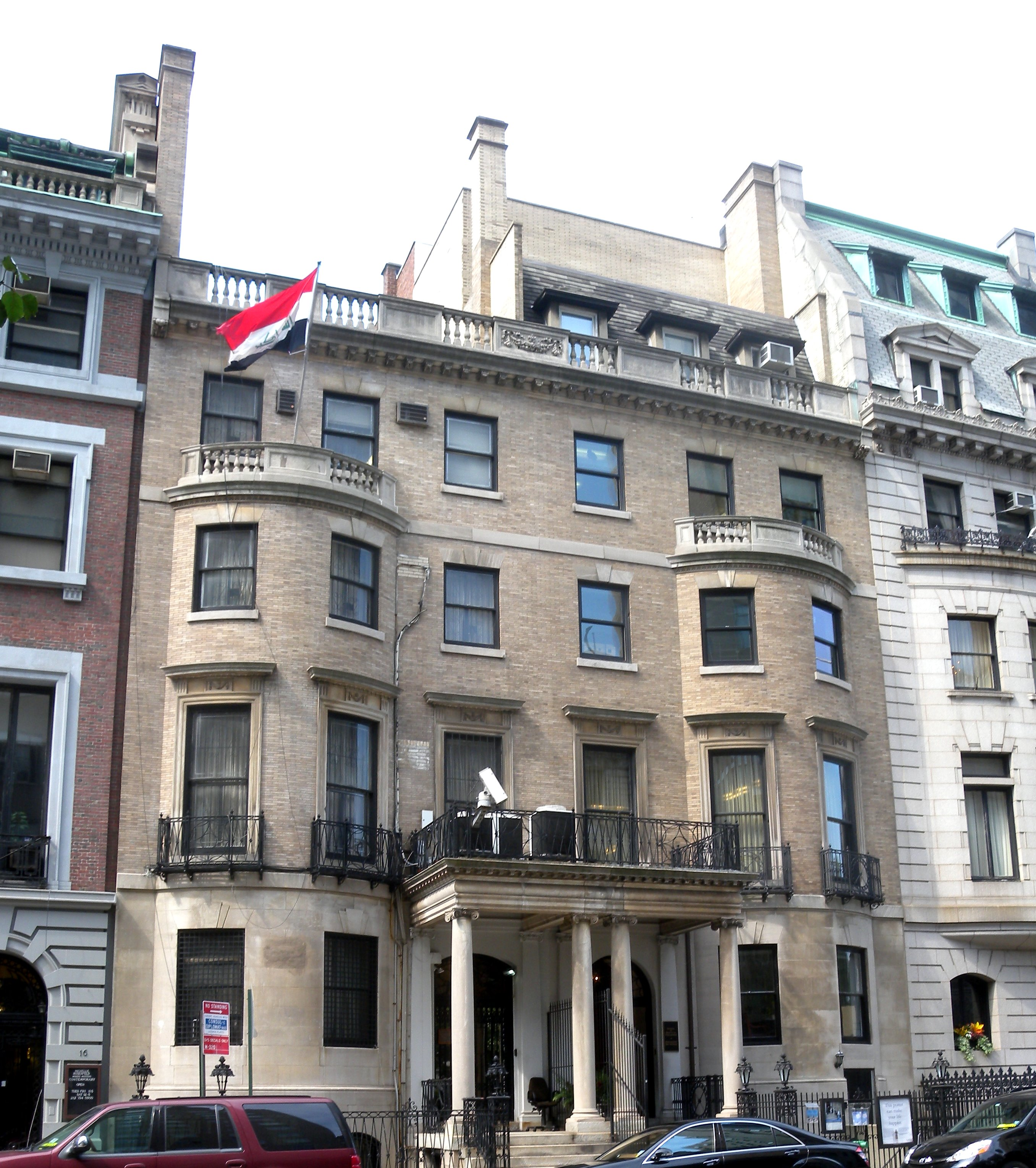
Permanent Mission to the U.N. in New York City

== Closed missions ==
=== Africa ===
| Host country | Host city | Mission | Year closed | Ref. |
|---|---|---|---|---|
| Somalia | Mogadishu | Embassy | Unknown | |
| Tanzania | Dar Es Salaam | Embassy (Note: To be reopened.) | Unknown | |

=== Americas ===
| Host country | Host city | Mission | Year closed | Ref. |
|---|---|---|---|---|
| Argentina | Buenos Aires | Embassy | 1993 | |

=== Asia ===
| Host country | Host city | Mission | Year closed | Ref. |
|---|---|---|---|---|
| Syria | Aleppo | Consulate | 1975 | |
| Thailand | Bangkok | Embassy | 2003 | |
| Yemen | Sanaa | Embassy | Unknown | |

=== Europe ===
| Host country | Host city | Mission | Year closed | Ref. |
|---|---|---|---|---|
| Belarus | Minsk | Embassy | 2017 | |
| Slovakia | Bratislava | Embassy | Unknown | |

== See also ==
- Foreign relations of Iraq
- Visa policy of Iraq
- List of diplomatic missions in Iraq
