= Howar Ziad =

Iraq Ambassador to Canada
- In office 2004–2010
- Succeeded by: Abdulrahman Hamid Mohammed Al-Hussaini

Howar Ziad was the ambassador of Iraq to Canada. He is also a senior advisor to Jalal Talabani, the former president of Iraq. Prior to his diplomatic career, Ziad and his family had a long history of participation in the Kurdish freedom movement. His father, Kaka Ziad was the Vice President of the KDP in the 1950s and was also a famous Kurdish leader of his time.

As a young man, Howar Ziad was active in the Kurdish student movement while studying in Europe. He went on to represent Kurdish interests abroad for many years, including a five-year stint as representative of the Kurdistan Regional Government at the United Nations (1999–2004).

Ambassador Ziad studied at Baghdad College and has a BSc in Economics from the London School of Economics.
