= Canada–Saudi Arabia relations =

- Canada: Saudi Arabia

Diplomatic mission
- Embassy of Canada, Riyadh: Embassy of Saudi Arabia, Ottawa

Envoy
- Ambassador Jean-Philippe Linteau: Ambassador Nayef bin Bandar al-Sudairi (withdrawn)

Canada and the Kingdom of Saudi Arabia have had a generally cordial relationship marred by periods of diplomatic tension. Both countries, however, share robust economic ties: Saudi Arabia is Canada's largest trading partner in the Middle East, and is also one of the largest recipients of Canadian military equipment. In February 2014, the Saudi government had purchased Canadian armaments worth CA$15 billion in total. Until August 2018, there were over 16,000 Saudi students enrolled in Canadian schools on government scholarships.

Since 2018, bilateral relations have gradually soured since a high-profile diplomatic spat began over the Canadian government's public condemnation of the Saudi government's human rights abuses. Canada had called for the immediate release of Saudi activist Raif Badawi and his sister Samar Badawi on 5 August 2018 after they were arrested by Saudi authorities on varying charges. In response, the Canadian government was accused of interfering in Saudi Arabia's internal affairs; the Canadian ambassador in Riyadh was declared persona non grata and expelled from the country, having been given 48 hours to leave. The Saudi ambassador in Ottawa was also recalled, and the Saudi government suspended all new trade (excluding oil sales) with Canada, terminated all flights and services of Saudia to Toronto, and cancelled the scholarships of thousands of Saudi students in Canada.

== History ==
=== Human rights abuses ===
In April 2000, Canadian Prime Minister Jean Chrétien made a state visit to Saudi Arabia. In the same year, Canadian William Sampson was arrested by the Saudi government for complicity in a suicide bombing in Riyadh, while maintaining his innocence. He was imprisoned and later criticized the Canadian government for not coming to his aid. He was freed by British intervention after being imprisoned for two years.

Since 2006, a Canadian citizen Nathalie Morin is stuck in Saudi Arabia with an abusive husband, fighting to go back to Canada along with her four children. With the ongoing escalated tensions between Saudi Arabia and Canada, the future of Morin remains unclear. According to Morin's mother Johanne Durocher, Morin is cut off from the world, locked in an apartment in Dammam, victim of physical, psychological and sexual violence from her spouse. Durocher has not had any contact with her daughter or grandchildren since August 2018.

In March 2008, Canadian citizen Mohamed Kohail was sentenced to death in Saudi Arabia over the killing of a 19-year old. His death sentence was revoked in 2010, and he was released in December 2012. During Kohail's imprisonment, several Canadian diplomats visited Saudi Arabia on Kohail's behalf.

=== August 2018 diplomatic row ===
Chrystia Freeland
(@cafreeland)
tweeted:

Very alarmed to learn that Samar Badawi, Raif Badawi's sister, has been imprisoned in Saudi Arabia. Canada stands together with the Badawi family in this difficult time, and we continue to strongly call for the release of both Raif and Samar Badawi.

2 August 2018

((Foreign Policy CAN))
(@CanadaFP)
tweeted:

Canada is gravely concerned about additional arrests of civil society and women's rights activists in #SaudiArabia, including Samar Badawi. We urge the Saudi authorities to immediately release them and all other peaceful #humanrights activists.

3 August 2018

Canadian Minister of Foreign Affairs Chrystia Freeland issued a statement via Twitter on 2 August 2018 expressing Canada's concern over the recent arrest of Samar Badawi, a human rights activist and sister of imprisoned Saudi activist Raif Badawi. Freeland advocated their release. Other Canadian diplomats and the Canadian Embassy in Riyadh later released statements of their own in which they called for the release of all peaceful human rights activists detained in the kingdom.

==== Saudi reaction ====
You can criticize us about human rights, women's rights … that's your right. You can sit down and talk about it, but demand the immediate release? What are we, a banana republic? Would any country accept it?

— Adel al-Jubeir, Saudi Foreign Minister

In response to Canada's criticism, the Saudi Ministry of Foreign Affairs published an official statement in which it "expressed disbelief" in the comments made by Freeland and the Canadian Embassy in Riyadh, which it considered to "not be based [on] any accurate or true information". The ministry went on to denounce the statements as "blatant interference in the Kingdom's domestic affairs". The Saudi government suspended all new trade and investment relations with Canada and expelled Canada's ambassador; it named Dennis Horak as persona non grata and gave him 24 hours to leave the country. Saudi Arabia also said it would recall its envoy to Canada temporarily but a statement said the country maintained "its right to take further action".

The Saudi freeze on all new trade with Canada included instructing staff to sell off all Canadian holdings, including equities, bonds and cash even if that means doing so at a loss. Saudi Arabia announced on 8 August that it would put a halt to its medical programs in Canada and move all Saudi patients receiving care in Canadian hospitals to hospitals in other countries. By that date, Saudi Arabia had begun selling all its Canadian assets to foreign investors.

Saudi students studying in Canada on Saudi Arabian scholarships were ordered to relocate to another country or risk losing financial assistance. Roughly 16,000 students were sponsored by such scholarships at the time of this decree. For the 2018–2019 school year, the University of Toronto had 216 postgraduate medical residents and fellows and 77 undergraduate students, while the University of Western Ontario had 75 undergraduate and graduate students. Western University also created a checklist for the students who have been ordered to leave Canada by 31 August 2018.

The state airline Saudia declared that all its flights to Toronto Pearson International Airport would be terminated as of August 13. Saudia operated regular passenger service to Toronto from King Khalid International Airport in Riyadh and King Abdulaziz International Airport in Jeddah.

As part of the economic sanctions, the Saudi Grains Organization (SAGO) advised that it would no longer accept wheat or barley of Canadian origin. However, an official statement from the Saudi energy minister, Khalid A. Al-Falih indicated that the diplomatic crisis would not impact the sale of oil to Canada by Saudi Aramco.

In response to suggestions in the news media about the possibility of outside mediation, Saudi Foreign Minister Adel al-Jubeir said on 8 August that his country would not engage in negotiations until Canada retracted its original statement calling for the release of human rights activists. The Toronto Star reported that the consensus among analysts indicated that the actions taken by Crown Prince Mohammad bin Salman were a "warning to the world — and to Saudi human rights activists — that his Saudi Arabia is not to be trifled with".

In an interview with the CBC, Iyad el-Baghdadi, President of the Al-Kawakibi Democracy Transition Center (an NGO) made this prediction as to the future of the relationship between the two countries. "Mohammad bin Salman has a tendency to start large actions that end up as quagmires, and I think unfortunately this is going to last for a while", and noted that while this was the first time Saudi Arabia had reacted this way to a Western country, such reactions from Saudi Arabia had become "routine within the region".

On 27 August, the Saudi Ministry of Education informed the 1,053 Saudi medical residents and fellows in Canada that they can "continue in their positions" and they no longer have to leave Canada by 31 August.

According to the Canadian network Global News, Saudi state-owned television Al Arabiya "has suggested that Canada is the worst country in the world for women, that it has the highest suicide rate and that it treats its Indigenous people the way Myanmar treats the Rohingya – a Muslim minority massacred and driven out of Myanmar en masse" which was described by Global News as "fake news" published by the Saudi television outlet.

===== Halting non-oil economic ties with Canada =====
There was some question as to how the Saudi sell-off would affect Canada's economy; year to date, Canada had exported C$1.4 billion in goods to Saudi Arabia, according to Statistics Canada. Middle East expert Rex Brynen of McGill University predicted that negative short-term economic effects were possible, but that the strategy would "mostly hurt Saudi-owned firms". Canadian grain farmers were concerned, however. The president of Cereals Canada said that barley trade especially would be affected since Saudi Arabia accounted for seven per cent of the annual exports; wheat sales were much more modest. An analyst with LeftField Commodity Research said in an interview with Reuters that "there will be plenty of opportunities for Canada to sell barley and wheat elsewhere". Global supplies of grain were already becoming tighter due to weather-related issues in Russia, Europe, and Australia. The former Canadian Wheat Board, now G3, is partly owned by the Saudi Arabian agriculture company SALIC.

The value of the Canadian dollar dropped slightly, but, on 8 August, it reached its highest level in over seven weeks due to data indicating economic growth and record high exports in recent months. The total impact of the Saudi sell-off on Canadian currency should be "ephemeral" according to Bipan Rai, executive director and North America Head of FX Strategy at CIBC Capital Markets.

The 800 to 1000 medical trainees sponsored by Saudi Arabia, who were at the Resident and Fellow level, were providing direct care to Canadian patients at no cost to the healthcare system. Hospitals were uncertain as to how these services could be replaced if the trainees were to leave Canada. As of late August 2018, they were allowed to remain until "an alternative assignment can be arranged", according to the Saudi Ministry of Education.

===== Infographic KSA's 9/11 post depicting Toronto's CN Tower =====
A Saudi Arabian youth organization named "Infographic KSA" uploaded an image to Twitter on 6 August of a passenger plane flying towards the CN Tower in the skyline of Toronto. It was widely perceived as a threat of a terrorist attack by Western media as an allusion to the September 11 attacks in which 15 of the 19 hijackers were citizens of Saudi Arabia. The group immediately deleted the post and released a public apology to "those who were offended", explaining that the picture was not meant to represent a terrorist attack and was instead meant to symbolize Canadian ambassador Dennis Horak's flight back to Canada. The Ministry of Culture and Information of Saudi Arabia launched an investigation into the incident and ordered the group to suspend its Twitter account.

==== Canadian response ====
Foreign Minister Freeland responded to the expulsion of Ambassador Horak at a press conference on 6 August. "Canada will always stand up for human rights in Canada and around the world, and women's rights are human rights."

On 8 August, Prime Minister Justin Trudeau told reporters that he refused to apologize for his country's involvement in promoting human rights, saying that "Canadians have always expected our government to speak strongly, firmly and politely about the need to respect human rights around the world" and that Canada will continue to "speak strongly, firmly and politely" about this issue. "We will continue to stand up for Canadian values and human rights. It's something that I will always do", he added.

In another comment about the "diplomatic difference of opinion", Trudeau said his country would continue a relationship with Saudi Arabia. "We have respect for their importance in the world and recognize that they have made progress on a number of important issues.

Former Conservative minister of foreign affairs John Baird appeared on Saudi Al Arabiya television to comment on the dispute and urged Prime Minister Justin Trudeau to fly to Riyadh to apologize in person to the Saudi royal family. Baird was working as a consultant and has business interests in Saudi Arabia at the time he made the comments, but in January 2015 while minister of foreign affairs in the Harper government, he had also protested Raif Badawi's case to the Saudis, specifically with Prince Turki bin Faisal Al Saud, a prominent member of the Saud family. A New Democratic Party member of Parliament, Charlie Angus called the appearance "stunning" and suggested that the ethics commissioner should investigate the incident.

==== International reaction ====
After the incident, the Saudi government has received official backing from the vast majority of the Arab League, while Canada received support from some members of the European Parliament. The day after Saudi Arabia downgraded ties, Yemen's Hadi government, the United Arab Emirates and Bahrain expressed support to Saudi Arabia.

The Arab Interior Ministers Council and Gulf Cooperation Council (GCC) secretary general Abdullatif bin Rashid Al Zayani in a statement expressing GCC reaction, condemned any interference in Saudi Arabia's sovereignty. However, Qatar, a GCC member, distanced itself from the remarks made by Al Zayani and stated that his comments "do not reflect its opinion" while mentioning that it maintains cordial relations with Canada.

Several countries indicated support for the measures taken by Saudi Arabia on 7 August, including the Palestinian Authority, Jordan, Djibouti, Mauritania, and Sudan. On 8 August, three more countries professed solidarity with the Saudi position: Egypt, Comoros, and Lebanon. Russia was critical of Canada, with Maria Zakharova of the Russian Foreign Ministry criticizing Canada for "politicizing human rights". Official support for the Saudi position was also expressed by Pakistan. and Somalia. Oman and Kuwait reprimanded Canada for what they considered meddling, but also conveyed their desires for hasty resolution of the dispute.

Canada's NATO ally Turkey backed Saudi Arabia in its dispute with Canada, rejecting the Canadian actions as a "form of interference in other countries' internal affairs". The United States declared that it would not get involved in the dispute. State Department spokesperson Heather Nauert said: "It is up for the Government of Saudi Arabia and the Canadians to work this out. Both sides need to diplomatically resolve this together. We cannot do it for them."

Sources told Reuters on 6 August that Canada was seeking help from its allies the United Kingdom and the United Arab Emirates to defuse the diplomatic dispute. The UK Foreign and Commonwealth Office urged restraint from both sides of the dispute and said that it had raised its concerns about the recent arrest of human rights defenders to the Saudi Arabian government. A Bloomberg article on 10 August cited an unnamed "senior U.S. official" as stating that unspecified persons were trying to do behind-the-scenes damage control. It is believed that the Canadian government received support from the British, German and Swedish governments through back-channels.

== Economic relations ==
Saudi Arabia is Canada's 17th largest trading partner. Saudi Arabia imported $1.5 billion worth of Canadian goods in 2015 according to the World Bank. Canada imported $1.5 billion worth of Saudi goods in 2015.

From the end of 2012 until the middle of 2018, Saudi Arabia had become Canada's second largest export market in the Middle East. Much like Israel, most of the success of the former Canadian-Saudi relations was attributable to opposition to Iran and other countries in the region. On the bilateral relations with Saudi Arabia, economic and trade interests used to be at the forefront of all discussions and meetings.

Several private Islamic schools in Canada have been directly financed by Saudi Arabia to the tune of hundreds of thousands of dollars. This has proved controversial, with detractors claiming that these schools can be used to propagate Saudi Arabia's strict form of Islam known as Wahhabism.

== Military relations ==
=== Iraqi invasion of Kuwait ===
During the Gulf War, both Canadian and Saudi forces cooperated with the coalition forces to quell the invasion of Kuwait and the advancement of the Iraqi military. In February 1991, Canada opened up a field hospital in Saudi Arabia in the north-eastern village of Qaisumah to treat both coalition and Iraqi troops.

=== War on Terror ===
Both countries reached in an agreement in February 2014 under which Saudi Arabia would purchase C$15 billion worth of military equipment from Canada. According to the CBC, this deal included 928 light armoured vehicles, specifically, a model known as LAV-6. Among these LAV-6s, 119 were categorized as heavy assault. Also included under this deal is a 14-year provision of technical assistance. This deal solidified Saudi Arabia as the second-largest export destination for Canadian arms after the US. The CBC reported that the first shipment of vehicles would arrive in Saudi Arabia by 2017.

Although the deal was penned by Stephen Harper's Conservative government, Liberal Prime Minister Justin Trudeau gave the go-ahead for the deal to proceed in April 2016 when he assigned permits allowing for the export of the vehicles. When Trudeau was confronted about the possibility of Saudi Arabia using the vehicles against its civilian population, he stated that he was obliged to respect the deal made by his predecessor. In August 2017, Canadian Foreign Minister Chrystia Freeland initiated an investigation into Saudi usage of Canadian-made vehicles and in February 2018 the investigative team concluded that there was no definitive evidence that Saudi Arabia had ever inflicted human rights abuses using vehicles originating from Canada.

==== Canada's support for the Saudi-led intervention in Yemen ====
This deal immediately came under fire from numerous Canadian politicians and news outlets who believed that the vehicles may be misused by Saudi Arabia to commit human rights violations, particularly against its minority Shiite population. Furthermore, when Saudi Arabia invaded Yemen in 2015, questions were raised over whether the vehicles would be used against Yemeni civilians.

A panel of independent experts monitoring the Yemen conflict for United Nations, included the name of Canada in their report for the period ending in June, 2020, in fueling the war in Yemen by selling weapons to Saudi Arabia that were later used in the Yemen war causing the biggest humanitarian crisis. In response, a letter dated 17 September was sent to Canada's Prime Minister Justin Trudeau by 39 human rights, arms-control and labor groups, urging to stop arms sales to Saudi Arabia.

On 1 March 2021, Canada-Wide Peace and Justice Network wrote an open letter to the Canadian PM, urging the government to end its arms sales to the Kingdom of Saudi Arabia due to the latter's role in Yemen war. The letter was also undersigned by a total of 68 organizations, who also called out the Canadian government to increase its humanitarian aid to Yemen. In 2021, the Minister of International Development pledged a $69.9 million worth of humanitarian aid to Yemen. However, according to human rights groups the government has also sanctioned arms sale worth $6 billion since 2015 and $2.7 billion in 2019 to Saudi Arabia.

== Cultural relations ==
The embassy of Saudi Arabia helps organize annual Saudi National Day celebrations in Ottawa; in collaboration with the Saudi Arabian Cultural Bureau in Canada.

=== Educational exchange ===
The Saudi Arabian Cultural Bureau in Canada (SACB) whose head of mission is the Saudi Arabian cultural attaché, launched in May 1978 as a subsidiary of the Saudi Ministry of Education and is responsible for the management of Saudi students in Canada. One of its most important departments is its academic relations unit, which controls the submission of important documents to Canadian universities, such as transcripts and admission documents, and is also active in organizing official visits and signing cooperative agreements. Other departments of the SACB include an English language preparation unit and an admissions unit, which provides enrolment advice to Saudi students and monitors the status of admissions.

There were more than 15,000 Saudi students in Canada in 2007, including 800 resident physicians and specialists who provided care to the Canadian population, offsetting Canadian aid to Saudis. In 2015, Saudi Arabian students represented 3% of total foreign students in Canada. Official figures provided by the SACB indicated that in 2014 there were 16,000 Saudi scholarship students in Canada and 1,000 medical trainees.

In mid 2018, most educational ties were downgraded.

== Diplomatic relations ==
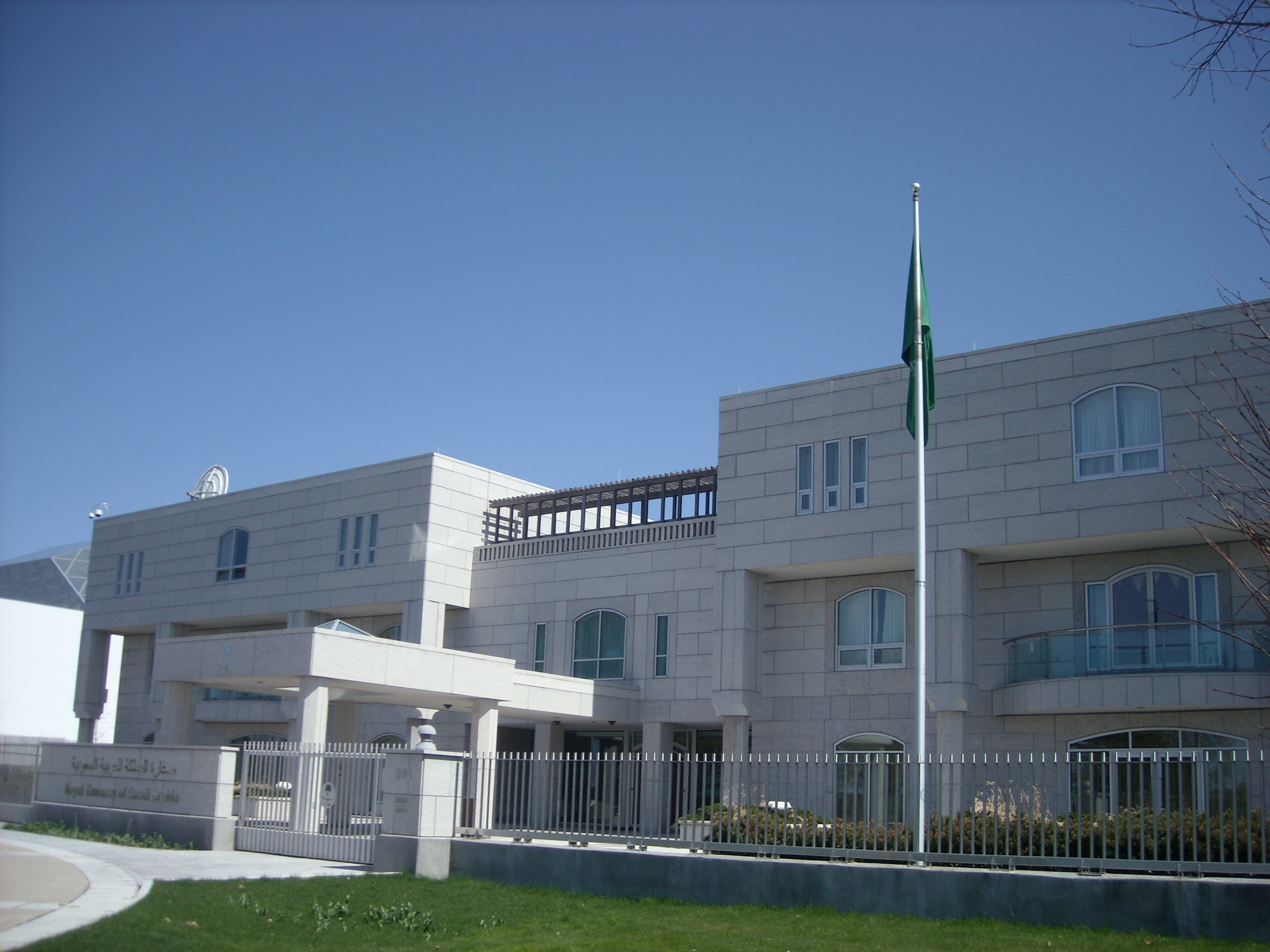
Embassy of Saudi Arabia to Canada in Ottawa. Both countries maintain an embassy in the other's capital.

Both countries maintain an embassy in the other's respective capital cities, with the embassy of Saudi Arabia to Canada based in Ottawa, and the embassy of Canada based in Riyadh.

In a meeting held in Ottawa in December 2015, Canada's minister of foreign affairs Stéphane Dion met with his Saudi counterpart Adel al-Jubeir to discuss matters pertaining to human rights in Saudi Arabia. During the meeting, the Saudi government's detainment of human rights activist Raif Badawi was brought up.

Following the 2016 Saudi Arabia mass execution in which 47 civilians convicted of terrorism were executed, Stéphane Dion requested that Saudi Arabia respect due process and to follow international norms in regards to human rights.

Global Affairs Canada also voiced concerns over the possibility that these executions could renew sectarian friction in the Middle East.

In May 2023, Canada and Saudi Arabia restored their diplomatic ties.

== See also ==
- List of ambassadors of Canada to Saudi Arabia
- Foreign relations of Canada
- Foreign relations of Saudi Arabia
- Human rights in Saudi Arabia
- Royal Embassy of Saudi Arabia in Ottawa
- Saudi Canadians
