= Al-Ha'ir prison =

Saudi Arabian prison

Coordinates: 24.449°N 46.813°E

al-Ha'ir prison (Arabic: سجن الحائر), also known as al-Hayer al-Hayar or al-Haer, is a Saudi Arabian political, maximum-security, Mabahith-affiliated prison located approximately 25 miles south of Riyadh. It is the largest prison complex in Saudi Arabia and houses both men and women. It includes isolation cells and torture rooms. Reportedly, a number of members of al-Qaeda are held there. There is also confirmation of people unfavored by the royal family being held there, including princesses and princes, journalists, business rivals, political rivals, international prisoners, and alleged dissidents or persons needing to be silenced, made an example of, and destroyed psychologically and physically. Many people have been held without charge, have no current, pending, or even past court dates, nor a future release date. Past prisoners report being subjected to constant psychological, environmental, physical, social, and sexual torture. Many noted persons are confirmed to be held there under these conditions. Many other individuals are suspected to be held there, as the Saudi government limits communication for captives and refuses to provide information concerning certain detainees as a policy.

== Prison conditions ==
In 2015, journalist Kevin Sullivan of The Washington Post visited al-Ha'ir prison, including one cell that looked "spartan but clean", in which an inmate described the conditions as "good". Sullivan's host described the prison as illustrating the "government’s strategy of showering inmates with perks rather than locking them down in harsh, Guantanamo Bay-style conditions". Gary Hill of the International Corrections and Prisons Association spent over two decades visiting Saudi Arabia advising on prison warden training and stated to Sullivan that he expected prisoners in Saudi Arabian prisons "to be treated nicely — that's their religion". As of 2015, Hill had never visited any Saudi prison. Sullivan also interviewed Ministry of Interior spokesman Mansour al-Turki, who stated that the recidivism rate for terrorist incidents by ex-detainees was twenty percent, and Sevag Kechichian of Amnesty International, who stated that "allegations of mistreatment and torture of prisoners in Saudi prisons are widespread" and that "torture can still happen even in nice-looking prisons — when no one is looking".

During the 2011–2012 Saudi Arabian protests, security forces fired live bullets in the air on 19 August 2012 at a protest at al-Ha'ir Prison.

== Notable inmates ==
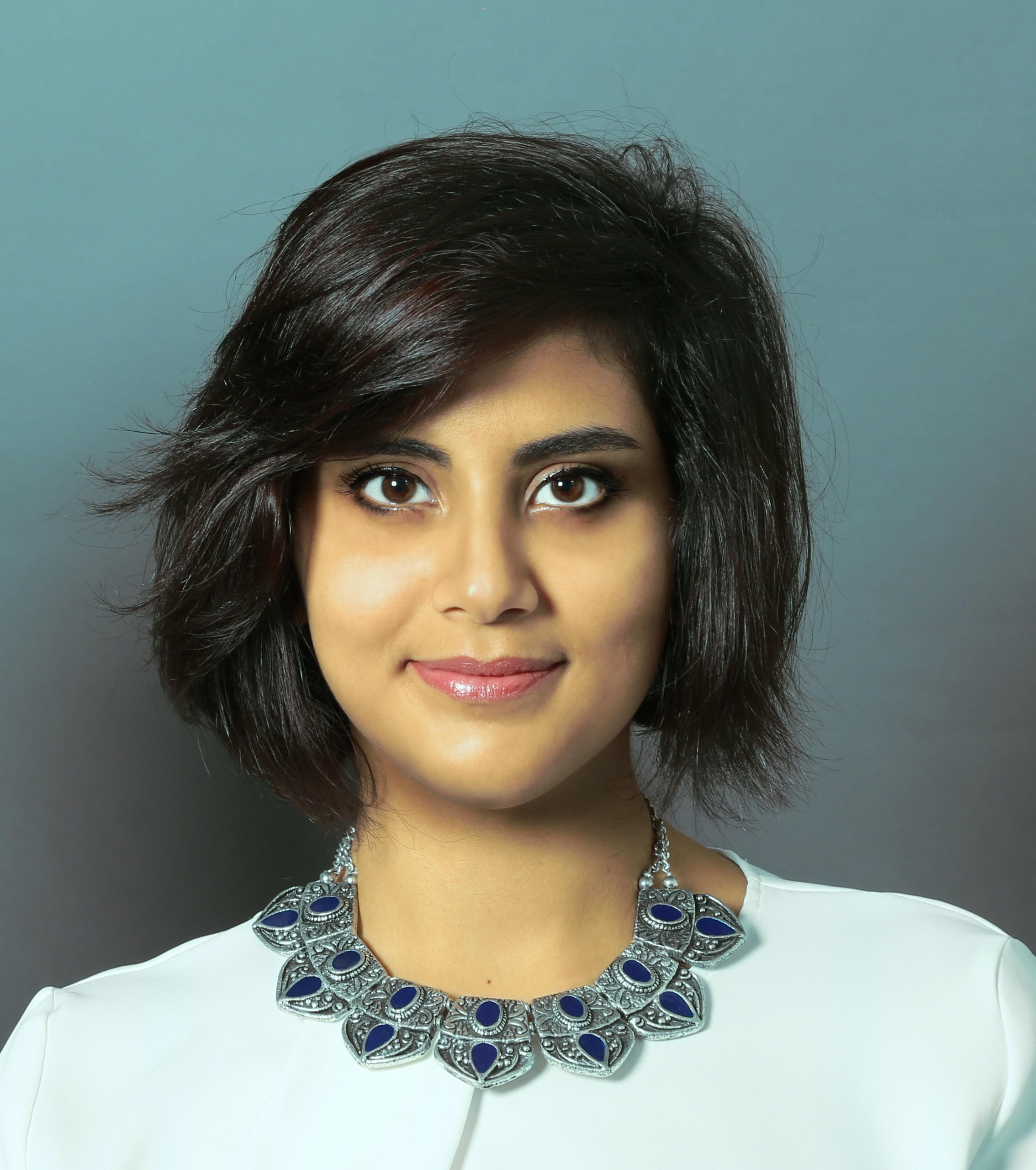
Loujain al-Hathloul, 2016

- William Sampson, a British-Canadian man tortured and kept in solitary confinement for 31 months, and Sandy Mitchell, one of Sampson's co-accused, were detained from 2001 to 2003.
- Mohammad al-Harbi, a Saudi high-school chemistry teacher who was accused of blasphemy and preventing students from performing ablutions and sentenced to 750 lashes and 40 months of imprisonment.
- Hani al-Sayegh, a Saudi controversially accused of complicity in the Khobar towers bombing, was detained starting from 2000.
- Prince Al-Waleed bin Talal, a billionaire Saudi investor who was detained during the 2017 Saudi Arabian purge and initially held at The Ritz-Carlton, Riyadh.
- Eleven princes of the House of Saud were detained at al-Ha'ir on 6 January 2018, after they publicly protested in opposition to a new government policy requiring royal family members to pay their own electricity and water bills and with a request for monetary compensation for a death sentence against one of their cousins.
- Loujain al-Hathloul was released from the prison on 10 February 2021.
- Princess Basmah bint Saud bin Abdulaziz al-Saud, a 56-year-old Saudi royal family member was detained from March 2019 until January 2022 for publicly questioning government policy.
- Osama Khalid, a Wikipedia administrator who was sentenced to 32 years in 2022 for posting content "deemed to be critical about the persecution of political activists in the country".

== Lawsuit ==
In October 2004, former detainees William Sampson, Sandy Mitchell and Les Walker, part of a group of nine foreign nationals convicted of bombing, terrorism and espionage (and subsequently released on royal pardon), were given permission by the Court of Appeal of England and Wales to sue individuals (but not the Saudi government itself) for redress for wrongful conviction and torture. Named in the suit were:

- Prince Naif, Minister of Interior
- Mohammed Said, governor of al-Ha'ir Prison
- Ibrahim al-Dali, officer of the Mabahith (the Saudi Arabian general intelligence service)
- Khaled al-Saleh, officer of the Mabahith

In 2006, the Saudi government appealed the decision on the basis of the State Immunity Act. The original judgement was subsequently overturned by the Law Lords. The plaintiffs appealed to the European Court of Human Rights, which agreed Britain's decision did not violate the Human Rights Convention.

== See also ==
- Human rights in Saudi Arabia
