= Kacem El Ghazzali =

Moroccan blogger, writer, activist (born 1990)

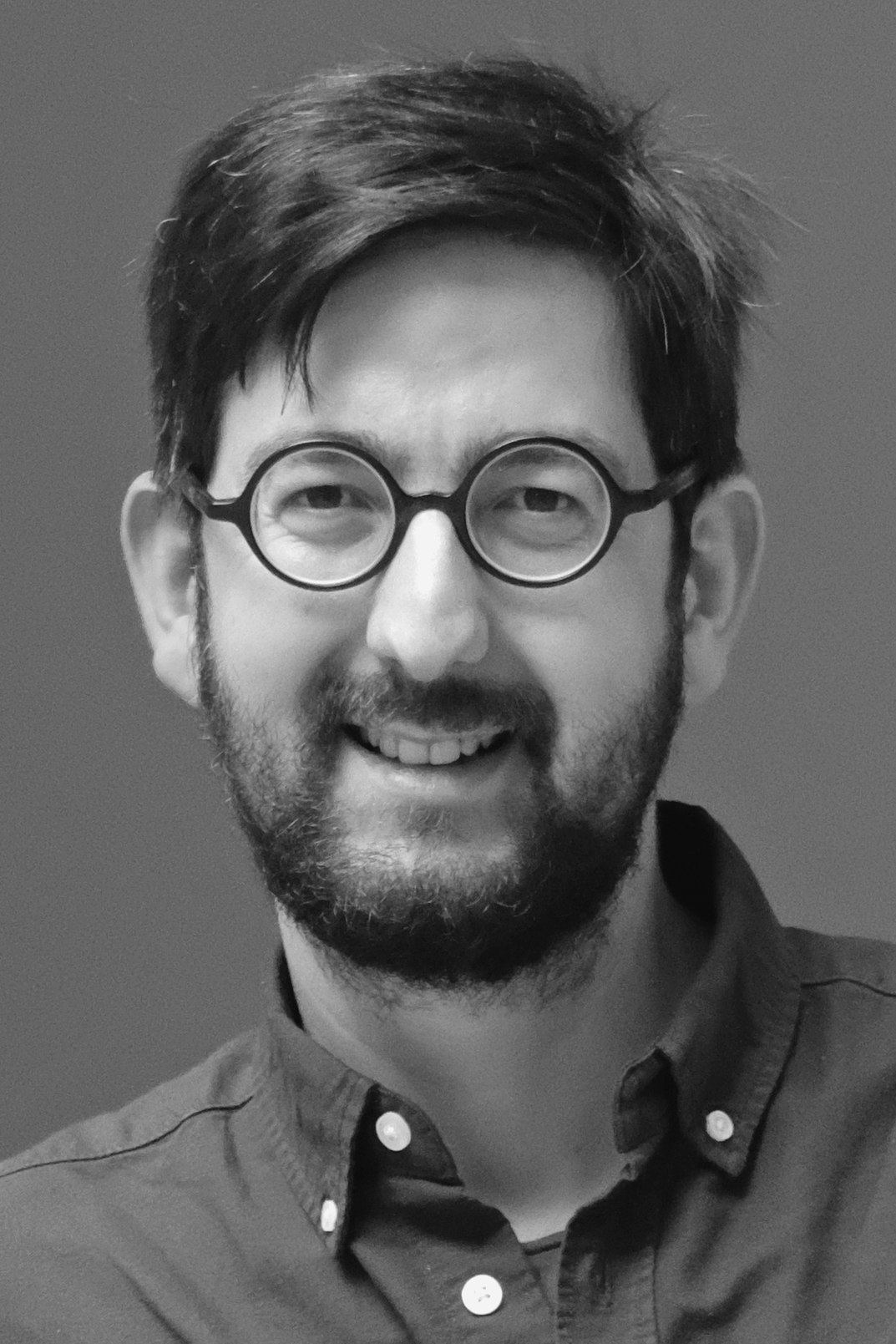
- El Ghazzali in 2020
- Born: 24 June 1990 (age 36); Sidi Kacem, Morocco
- Occupations: Essayist, human rights activist
- Known for: International representative of IHEU at the UNHRC
- Website: kacemelghazzali.com

Kacem El Ghazzali (Berber languages: ⵇⴰⵙⵎ ⵍⵖⴰⵣⴰⵍⵉ, Arabic: قاسم الغزالي; born 24 June 1990), is a Moroccan-Swiss secularist essayist and activist and is one of the few publicly atheist Moroccans. He graduated in Middle Eastern and Islamic studies from the University of Bern. Kacem speaks English, as well as German, French, Arabic and Berber. Mostly known for his publicly voiced atheism, his writings stress the importance of freedom of thought which, in his view, is lacking in countries dominated by Islam. His articles have been published in/by the Richard Dawkins Foundation, Huffington Post, Le Monde, Neue Zürcher Zeitung, Frankfurter Allgemeine Zeitung, Basler Zeitung, Tages Anzeiger, Berlingske and others.

In 2017, El Ghazzali was granted Swiss citizenship, and was chosen as one of the 14 most influential Swiss intellectuals of the year by the Basler Zeitung. El Ghazzali was also named Swiss of the Year 2018 by the Sunday newspaper SonntagsZeitung among 30 other personalities. In the same year he was one of the 200 most prominent Zurich personalities of the Swiss Magazine Who is Who.

== Biography ==
El Ghazzali comes from a Sufi Berber family. His grandfather built a mosque in his village, his father, a dentist, wanted to have the son trained as an imam. Although Sufism preaches a mystical, undogmatic Islam, Kacem found the religion restrictive and controlling.

=== Blogging and activism ===
El Ghazzali was the author of the Bahmut blog, one of the most controversial blogs in the Arab and Amazigh world, and has received a number of death threats because of his views. His blog discusses issues ranging from freedom of expression to political Islam. He used to be the head of the Youth Chapter at the Moroccan Center for Human Rights and is a member of the Executive Board of the Moroccan Blogger Association and CyberDissidents.org Blogger Board and one of its founders.

El Ghazzali is one of the few atheist activists in Morocco and is a proponent of religious and sexual freedom. When he publicly declared his atheism in 2010, it caused outrage in Moroccan society, and resulted in public protests and numerous death threats against him. He has been living as a refugee in Switzerland since 2011. He has appeared repeatedly in international media, including television.

In 2012, he launched the "Masayminch" initiative, which calls on Moroccans who do not observe Ramadan to eat publicly. Moroccans born in non-Jewish families are forbidden by law to drink, eat, or smoke in public during Ramadan. In the same year, El Ghazzali founded the Association of Ex-Muslims of Switzerland, which in December 2012 successfully raised public pressure to ban Saudi fundamentalist imam Mohamad al-Arefe from entering Switzerland to preach.

His novel Casablanca Geneva flight number: 8J540 (2013) is named after the airplane 'flight to freedom' that brought him from Morocco to Switzerland.

El Ghazzali was a speaker at the 47th session of the St. Gallen Symposium on 3–5 May 2017 and was one of the members of the Symposium Leaders of Tomorrow-knowledge pool.

=== Human rights at the UN HRC ===
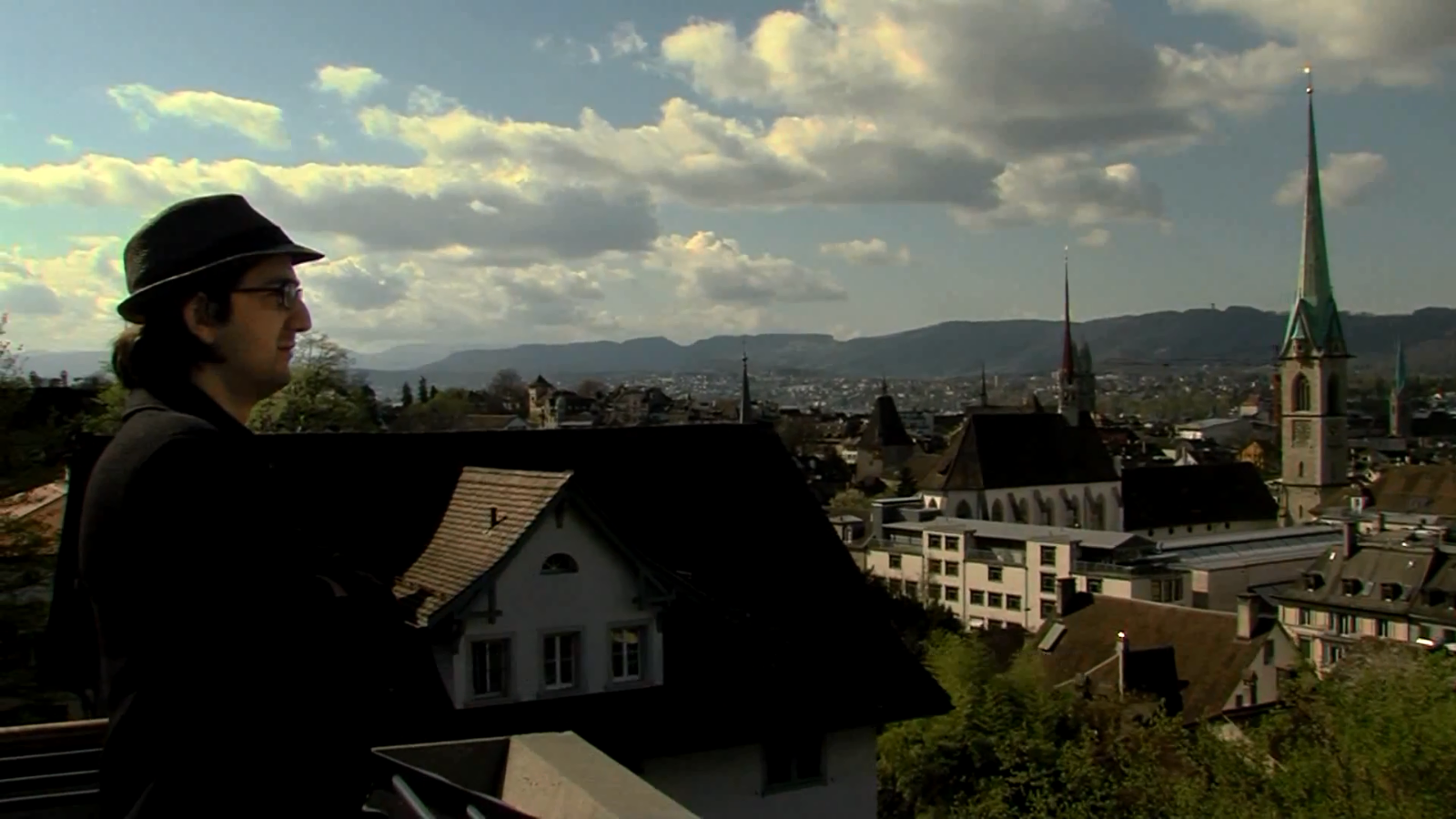
El Ghazzali looking over Zürich, 2014

Since 2012 El Ghazzali has been serving as International Humanist and Ethical Union Representative at the United Nations Human Rights Council, Geneva, where he criticized Saudi Arabia for persecuting freethinkers and liberals like the poet Hamza Kashgari and the blogger Raif Badawi. El Ghazali also criticised his home state of Morocco for unconstitutionally silencing the voices of atheists. During the 25th Session of the Human Rights Council, El Ghazzali criticised the fact that several states in which convicted ‘blasphemers’ are currently in jail are also current members of the Human Rights Council.

At the beginning of the 37th session of the Human Rights Council, Iran's Justice Minister Alireza Avayi criticised “self-identified champions of human rights who, through finger pointing, unjustly and widely blame others for violations of human rights” at the United Nations. In his intervention, El Ghazzali criticised the fact that Iran prevents girls and women from attending certain sporting events and forces them to wear the veil. Addressing the council, El Ghazzali also said that "Iran’s human rights record brings shame on us all."

=== Raif Badawi Foundation ===
In September 2015, Ensaf Haidar announced the formation of the Raif Badawi Foundation, named for her husband who is now carrying out a decade-long prison term, sentenced to 1000 lashes for his religious and political dissent. El Ghazzali was chosen as a member of the international advisory board (as co-director) of Raif Badawi Foundation for Freedom.

== Works ==
- Casablanca Geneva flight number: 8J540 (Novel in Arabic), 2013.
