= Embassy of Saudi Arabia, Ottawa =

Diplomatic mission of Saudi Arabia in Canada

Embassy of Saudi Arabia in Ottawa
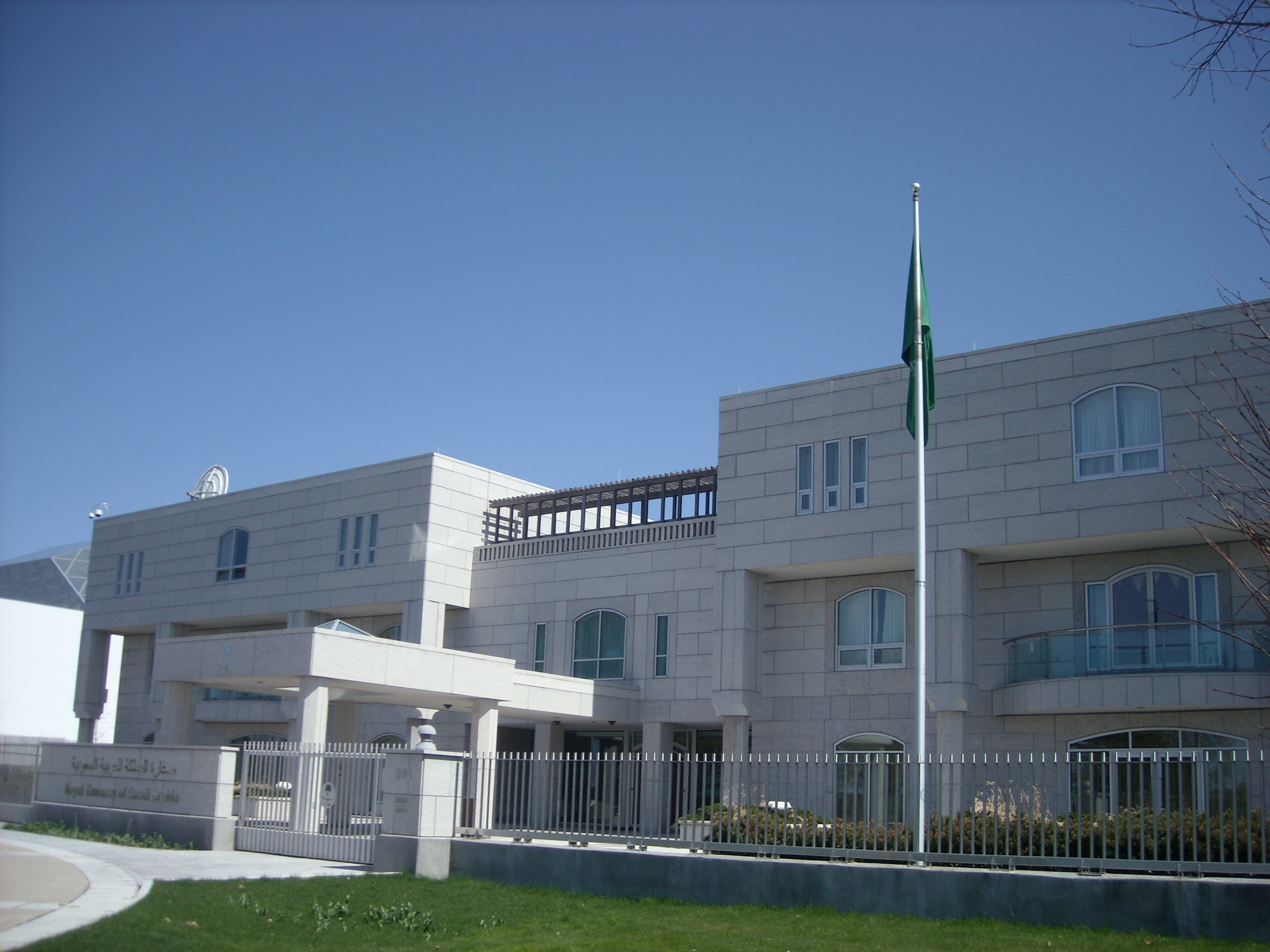
- Location: Ottawa
- Address: 201 Sussex Drive
- Coordinates: 45.434434°N 75.698408°W
- Chargé d'affaires: Abdulaziz bin Mohammed Al-Badi

Royal Embassy of Saudi Arabia in Ottawa (Arabic: سفارة المملكة العربية السعودية الملكية في أتاوا Sifāra al-Mamlaka al-`Arabīya as-Su`ūdīya al-Malikīya fī Uttāwā) is Saudi Arabia's diplomatic mission to Canada. The building is located at 201 Sussex Drive in Ottawa, overlooking the Ottawa River. Prior to 2005, it was located in an office in the Clarica Centre on Bank Street.

== Planning and construction ==
The Saudis bought the prime land in 1978 for $900 000 and top Canadian architect Arthur Erickson was hired to do the design. It was many years before construction began; however, as Saudi cut backs in the 1980s halted the lavish scheme. Plans to build a somewhat smaller structure were announced in 1989. In the meantime, the National Capital Commission had striven to turn Sussex Drive into a ceremonial boulevard and it balked at the Saudi design, threatening to take back the land. The project again came to a halt.

In 1997, a new design was developed, but neighbours complained vigorously about the number of armed guards that would surround it and the loss of green space. The plan was approved by Ottawa City Council, except for the guard houses and access road. The Saudis stated that without them the embassy could not function and shelved the $25 million project. The city and embassy negotiated and the Saudis made compromises on the size of the guardhouses and in other areas and city council, to the displeasure of local residents, approved the plan in May 1998.

The exterior of the building was completed in 2001; however it remained empty for some time, reportedly due to the strained Canadian-Saudi relations over the case of William Sampson. The Saudi embassy reported that its staff were too busy with diplomatic matters in the aftermath of the 9/11 attacks to take time off to move to new quarters. Work on the interior resumed in March 2004 and was opened in August 2005.

== See also ==
- Canada–Saudi Arabia relations
- Saudi Canadians
