= Abd al-Rahman al-Kawakibi =

Syrian theologian and philosopher (c.1850-c.1902)

- عبد الرحمن الكواكبي
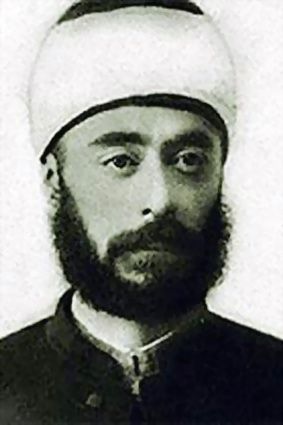
- Born: 8 July 1854; Aleppo, Ottoman Empire
- Died: 22 June 1902 (aged 47); Cairo, Egypt, British Africa

Philosophical work
- Era: 19th-century philosophy
- Region: Islamic Philosophy
- School: Arab nationalism
- Main interests: Islamic philosophy, anti-colonialism, Arab unity
- Notable ideas: Separation of state and religion, Islamic constitutionalism, Arab independence

Abd al-Rahman al-Kawakibi (Arabic: عبد الرحمن الكواكبي; 8 July 1854 - 22 June 1902) was a Syrian political and social pioneer from Aleppo. He is best known for his critique of despotism, political corruption, and the abuse of religion by unjust governments. Writing in the context of increasing Ottoman authoritarian governance, al-Kawakibi argued that tyranny was a principal cause of political and social decline in Arab societies and that the Arab world needed justice, education, public accountability, and institutional reform to rise again.

His most influential works, Taba'i' al-Istibdad wa Masari' al-Isti'bad (The Nature of Tyranny And the Struggle Against Enslavement) and Umm al-Qura (Mother of All Villages), are important texts in Arab reformist thought. In these texts, Al-Kawakibi critiques Ottoman governance and calls for moral and intellectual renewal, while also advancing an early framework for Arab solidarity and political revival to counter colonial influence. His critiques helped influence subsequent thinking by constitutionalists, reformists, and anti-colonial thinkers in the Arab world. His texts revolved around liberty, separation of church and state, and governance. He died in Cairo in 1902 due to alleged poisoning by Ottoman agents.

== Early life ==
Al-Kawakibi was born in Aleppo to an influential Syrian family. He received a thorough traditional education in religious and legal studies and studied Arabic, Turkish, and Persian. Raised in Aleppo during a period of political change in Ottoman Syria, he grew up in a city known for its intellectual and civic life, where he developed an early interest in literature and politics. His entry into public life came at an early age: by twenty-two, he had been appointed editor of Aleppo's official newspaper, and he later worked on Furat (the city's official paper) from 1875 to 1880. These early experiences in education and journalism helped shape his later career as a leading Arab intellectual, political reformer, and one of the most influential early critics of authoritarian rule in the modern Arab world.

== Career ==
After working at Furat and al-Manar, Al-Kawakibi started his own literary journal called the al-Sahba. The journal vehemently criticized the despots and dictators of his time, and alluded to the tyranny of the Ottoman Empire. He especially focused his criticism on the new Vali of Aleppo, Jamil Pasha. Due to Al-Kawakibi's political outspokenness, the journal was shut down by the local Ottoman government after only 15 issues. After his work as editor, Al-Kawakibi entered politics more directly, and worked for various positions in the Ottoman civil service in Aleppo. Despite his opposition to the Ottoman Empire, Al-Kawakibi wanted to serve Arabs. During this point in his career, he became an honorary member of the board of lawyer examinations. Al-Kawakibi, along with other Aleppans, complained about the Vali to the central government in Istanbul. These criticisms fell on deaf ears until Istanbul sent a representative to Aleppo to investigate, and immediately threw Al-Kawakibi and his followers into prison for false complaints. Once released from prison, Al-Kawakibi's popularity rose and he became the mayor of Aleppo in 1892. Later on Al-Kawakibi went to Istanbul to study the Ottoman Empire's despotism and problematic leadership more extensively. With his newfound knowledge, he returned to Aleppo and began working for the Ottoman government again. Because of his opinions, he was subject to harassment and intimidated on a regular basis. He decided to publish his book Umm al-Qura (The Mother of Cities: Mecca) in Egypt, rather than in Syria, and finally left his home country in 1899, moving to Egypt where he was welcomed by other Islamic intellectuals residing there.

Al-Kawakibi was influenced by the teachings of Jamal al-Din al-Afghani as well his disciple Muhammad Abduh. Al-Afghani preached Pan-Islamic identity – with this as his basis, Al-Kawakibi went one step further, incorporating Al-Afghani's theories into Pan-Islamic Arabic solidarity. Another contemporary of Al-Kawakibi was the Islamic scholar and advocate for Arab independence, Sayyid Rashid Rida who was based in Egypt at the same time. Rida and Al-Kawakibi discussed ideas of Pan-Arabism as well as Quranic interpretations. Al-Kawakibi believed that Arabs should be representatives of Islam, not the Ottomans. Rida believed that blind-following (taqlid) was the reason for downfall of Muslims. They both advocated the revival of independent Islamic thinking (ijtihad).

== Ideas ==
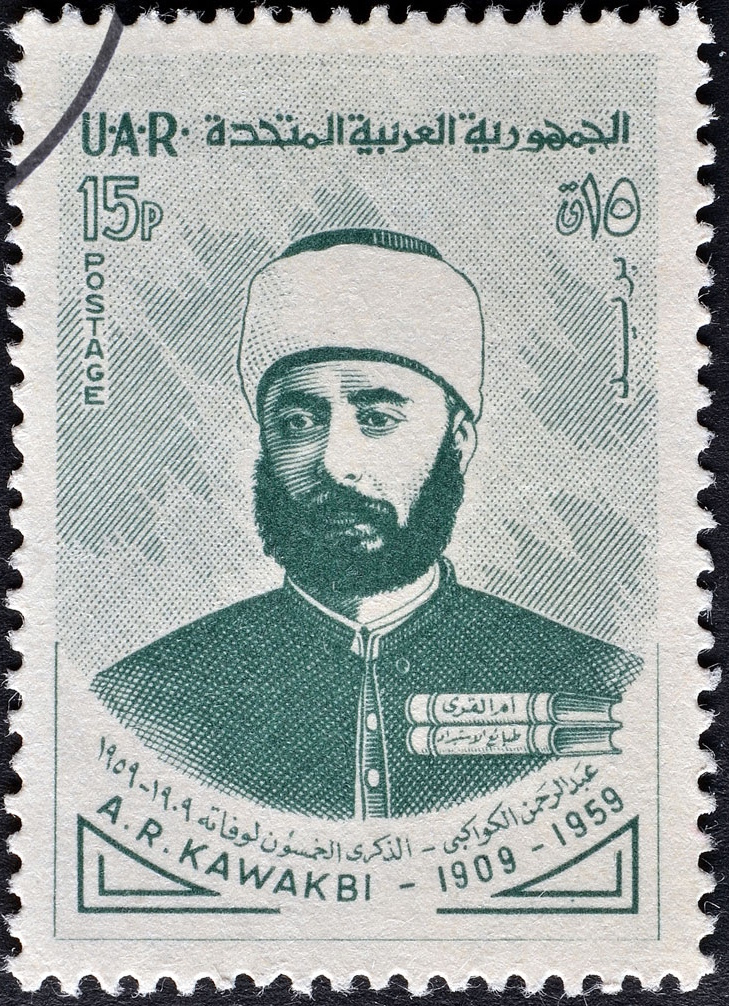
Al-Kawakibi on a stamp issued in 1960, celebrating the 50th anniversary of his death.

Al-Kawakibi, in his earlier writings, was careful not to specifically criticize the Ottoman rulers, but rather critiqued despots and imperialists in general, though his implied target was clear. In one of his most influential books Tabai al-Istibdad wa-Masari al-Isti’bad (The Nature of Despotism), he said that tyranny violated Islamic teachings and that tyrants were responsible for Muslim nations' weakness and struggle. Al-Kawakibi believed that the demise of the Muslims in the Arab world was due to the oppressive rule of the Ottoman Empire. He was a vocal opponent of the Sultan of the Ottoman Empire and believed that the Sultan had no right to control the Arab people. Al-Kawakibi said "If I had an army at my command I would overthrow Abdulhamid’s (Sultan of the Ottoman Empire) government in 24 hours." He also invoked Muhammad's sayings in order to rally people behind his cause. He believed that the Arabs were united unlike other Muslims and that there was no racial or sectarian segregation among Arabs. He stated that Arabs were, "of all nations the most suitable to be an authority in religion and an example to the Muslims; the other nations have followed their guidance at the start and will not refuse to follow them now."

According to Line Khatib, a political scientist and Middle East expert, Abd al-Rahman al-Kawakibi's contributions to liberal thought in the Arab world continue to resonate today. However, in Western academic discourse, Al- Kawakibi is often framed primarily as an Arab nationalist and Islamic reformer. Yet, as Khatib observes, "his political vision and his work on autocratic governance and democratic rule are equally impressive." This distinction stems from his seminal work, Taba’i‘ al-Istibdad wa Masari‘ al-Isti‘bad (1902) ["The Characteristics of Despotism and the Destructions of Enslavement"], which addresses what Al-Kawakibi viewed as the primary challenge facing the Arab region: despotism. The book stands as a liberal manifesto par excellence, delivering a scathing critique of Ottoman autocracy and repression while offering a systematic analysis and denunciation of despotism (istibdad). Al-Kawakibi identified tyranny as a profound affliction, describing it as “unaccountable, unlimited, arbitrary, self-serving, and exclusive rule”. In the preface, he boldly asserts that the root cause of the region's backwardness is “political despotism,” and its remedy lies in “constitutional democracy.” A;-Kawakibi viewed despotism as the origin of all societal maladies, or “the malady,” as he termed it. Political and social backwardness, he argued, are direct consequences of despotism, which fosters slavery (isti‘bad) and perpetuates ignorance. He elaborates on the vicious cycle created by this triad: despotism stifles knowledge and encourages ignorance—particularly in the social sciences and philosophy, disciplines that empower individuals to understand their rights and recognize freedom as essential to life. Ignorance, in turn, reinforces subjugation and undermines the social fabric. Ultimately, Al-Kawakibi saw despotism as the fountainhead of all corruption: “It corrupts the mind, religion, education, science, and morals. It is the source of injustice, humiliation, ignorance, poverty, unemployment, and ruin.”

According to Elizabeth F. Thompson, a historian of social movements and liberal constitutionalism in the Middle East at American University in Washington D.C., Al-Kawakibi's thoughts on Islamic democracy influenced an entire generation of Arab reformers. Al-Kawakibi published a newspaper in his hometown, Aleppo, that promoted equal rights for Armenians, Christians, and Jews. The truest expression of Islamic politics was democracy, Al-Kawakibi claimed, as long as it was based on the brotherhood and unity of Arabs regardless of religion and ethnicity.

Al-Kawakibi believed that there were a few reasons beyond the Ottoman's influence for the decline of Muslims at the time period. He believed that imitation (taqlid) caused the Muslims to be stagnant when it came to their religion and other forms of knowledge. Instead of continuously trying to interpret the Quran and hadiths, Muslims relied on interpretations from centuries ago. Other reasons for the decline of Muslims were he believed, that Muslims abandoned Islamic values and relied on superstitions, and also that they disregarded science and, by extension, were not able to keep up with modern society. However, Al-Kawakibi noted that the tyrannical nature of regimes was the root cause of the struggle of Arabs. The Ottomans prohibiting Arabs from education and imposing foreign rules, established in Istanbul, on Arabs under the control of the Ottoman Empire only elevated the position of the Turks and kept the other Muslims, especially Arabs in the dark. He believed that religion was used as an excuse by the Ottomans to unfairly rule over Arabs and other Muslims without understanding the cultural and local customs.

Al-Kawakibi argued that religious fanaticism had nothing to do with the original Islam of the Prophet and his companions. He blamed the Seljuk Turks for misinterpreting Islam goaded as they were by the Christian religious fanaticism exhibited by the crusaders. For him, the crusades served as the trigger for the spread of the ‘virus of religious fanaticism’ in the Middle East.

Al-Kawakibi additionally believed that Mecca should be the capital of the Islamic world, not Istanbul. He was a proponent of historical Arab exceptionalism as the founding location of Islam. He believed that the rightful Caliph should come from the Quraysh tribe as Muhammad did. His book Umm al-Qura (The Mother of Villages) reflects these ideas. His book contained a fictional story of an Islamic conference taking place in Mecca, thus illustrating the importance of Mecca to the Islamic world.

== Criticism ==
Al-Kawakibi's ideas were controversial to some. His critics alleged that he was a proponent of socialism. According to author Charles Tripp, the idea of “Islamic socialism” was advocated by Al-Kawakibi. Islamic socialism is the belief that the Quran permits redistribution of wealth, although that point is disputed by many Muslim scholars.

== Legacy ==
Although Al-Kawakibi did not have a tremendous amount of support during his lifetime, his ideas influenced entire future generations of Arab reformers and leaders, such as Faisal I, the King of the Arab Kingdom of Syria or Greater Syria in 1920 and King of Iraq from 23 August 1921 until his death. Additionally, Al-Kawakibi's message and legacy passed onto Pan-Arab nationalists such as Gamal Abdel Nasser, even though Al-Kawakibi was not a Pan-Arab nationalist but instead believed in Arab unity and solidarity.

According to the contemporary Lebanese historian, social commentator, and writer, Jean Dayeh, Al-Kawakibi was a Muslim political pioneer due to his ideas championing the separation of state and religion.

The Kawaakibi Foundation is named after him. Kawakibi's great-grandson, Salam Kawakibi, is a Paris-based intellectual and the director of the Arab Centre for Research and Policy Studies, who has co-published a collection of Kawakibi's essays "On Despotism" in French. For their virulent attacks on 'Abdul Hamid II and the autocratic rule of the Ottomans, ‘Abd al-Rahman al-Kawakibi, alongside the Lebanon-born Islamic reformer Rashid Rida (d. 1935), remain influential cultural icons in Pan-Arab circles.

== Death ==
Al-Kawakibi died in 22 June 1902 and many of his family and supporters alleged that he had been poisoned by Turkish agents. This has never been proven. Following Al-Kawakibi's death, the Ottomans were able to confiscate and destroy all but two books, The Nature of Tyranny and Umm al-Qura, written by Al-Kawakibi.

== See also ==
- Al-Kawakibi Democracy Transition Center
