= Sandy Mitchell =

Sandy Mitchell may refer to:

- Sandy Mitchell (prisoner)
- Sandy Mitchell (novelist)
- Sandy Mitchell (racing driver)
