= Saudi Canadians =

Canadians of Saudi origin

Saudi Canadians سعوديون كنديون
Total population
- 7,955 (2011 Canada Census)

Regions with significant populations
- Montreal, Toronto, Ottawa, Quebec City, Calgary

Languages
- Arabic (one of the dialects of Saudi Arabia), English and French

Religion
- Islam

Saudi Canadians (Arabic: سُعُودِيُّونْ كَنَدِيُّونْ, romanized: suʿudiyyūn kanadiyyūn) are Canadians of Saudi descent or Saudis who have Canadian citizenship. According to the 2011 Census there were 7,955 Canadians who claimed Saudi ancestry.

== Demography ==
=== Population ===
According to the 2011 Census there were 7,955 Canadians who claimed Saudi ancestry.

Until August 2018, there were over 16,000 Saudi students on government scholarships in Canada. There were more than 15,000 Saudi students in Canada in 2007, including 800 resident physicians and specialists who provided care to the Canadian population. In 2015, Saudi Arabian students represented 3% of total foreign students in Canada. Official figures provided by the Saudi Arabian Cultural Bureau in Canada (SACB) indicated that in 2014 there were 16,000 Saudi scholarship students in Canada and 1,000 medical trainees. As of 2026, there are currently 2,311 Saudi Arabian students studying in Canada.

=== Language ===
Most Saudi Canadians speak Arabic, English or French.

=== Religion ===
Saudi Canadian demography by religion
Religious group	2021 (Note: Religious breakdown proportions based on "Saudi Arabian" ethnic or cultural origin response on the 2021 census.)	
Religious group	Pop.	%
Islam	3,125	79.42%
Irreligion	595	15.12%
Christianity	180	4.57%
Hinduism	15	0.38%
Other	20	0.51%
Total Saudi Canadian population	3,935	100%

== Notable people ==
- Ensaf Haidar, Raif Badawi's wife and children were granted political asylum by the Government of Canada in 2013 and currently reside in Sherbrooke, Quebec. Haidar and her three children with Badawi became Canadian citizens on Canada Day, 2018. On the same day, Haidar called for the niqab to be banned.

== See also ==
- Canada–Saudi Arabia relations
- Embassy of Saudi Arabia, Ottawa
- Arab Canadians
- Saudi Americans
- Saudi Australians
- Arab diaspora
