= Raif Badawi =

Saudi Arabian writer and activist (born 1984)

- رائف بدوي
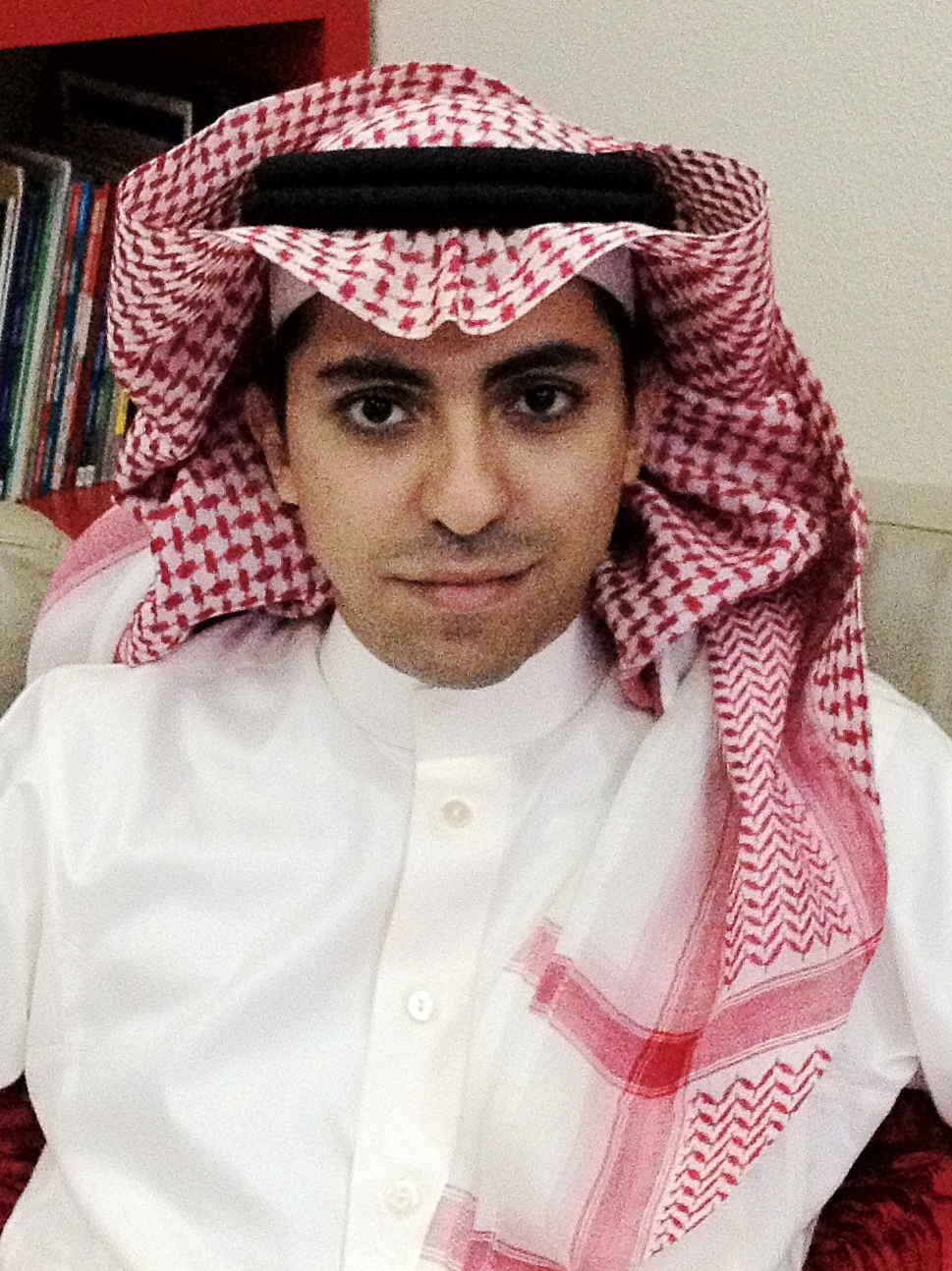
- Badawi in 2012
- Born: 13 January 1984 (age 42); Khobar, Eastern Province, Saudi Arabia
- Occupations: Author, writer and activist
- Known for: Blogging, apostasy charge
- Criminal charge: Insulting Islam
- Criminal penalty: 10 years in prison; 1000 lashes; fine of SAR 1 million
- Criminal status: Released 11 March 2022; banned from traveling abroad until 2032
- Spouse: Ensaf Haidar (m. 2002)
- Children: 3
- Relatives: Samar Badawi (sister)

Raif bin Muhammad Badawi (Arabic: رائف بن محمد بدوي, romanized: Rāʼif ibn Muḥammad Badawī, also transcribed Raef bin Mohammed Badawi; born 13 January 1984) is a Saudi writer, dissident and activist, the creator of the website Free Saudi Liberals.

Badawi was arrested in 2012 on a charge of "insulting Islam through electronic channels" and brought to court on several charges, including apostasy. In 2013, he was convicted on several charges and sentenced to seven years in prison, and 600 lashes. In 2014 his sentence was increased to 10 years in prison, 1,000 lashes, and a fine of one million Saudi riyals. The flogging was to be carried out over 20 weeks. The first 50 lashes were administered on 9 January 2015. The second flogging was postponed more than twelve times. The reason for the most recent postponement is unknown, but the previous scheduled floggings were delayed due to Badawi's poor health. Badawi is known to have hypertension, and his health worsened after the flogging began.

His wife, Ensaf Haidar, who took refuge in Canada after her life was threatened in Saudi Arabia, said that Badawi would not survive further flogging. Ensaf Haidar has given a series of televised interviews about Badawi's plight, including at the 2016 Geneva Summit for Human Rights and Democracy.

The Canada-based Raoul Wallenberg Centre for Human Rights acts as Badawi's international legal counsel. The organization has led both public advocacy campaigns as well as private diplomatic efforts to help secure Badawi's release from prison.

While his exact location was unknown, it was reported that Badawi was imprisoned in Dhahban Central Prison. On 11 March 2022, his family reported that after 10 years Badawi was released from prison. While he is no longer in prison, his 10-year passport ban continues and he may not leave the country. Al Jazeera quoted an anonymous interior ministry official as saying on 12 March, "the sentence handed down to Raif was 10 years in prison followed by a travel ban for the same length of time. The court ruling holds up and is final. ... He cannot leave the kingdom for another 10 years unless a [royal] pardon is issued."

== Early life ==
Raif Badawi was born on 13 January 1984 in Khobar, Saudi Arabia, to Najwa, a Lebanese Christian mother, and Muhammad Badawi, a Saudi Muslim. His Saudi grandmother explained to him at a young age that Saudi society historically was not as strict and men and women used to work together in the fields.

Badawi's mother died young at an unknown age. He was presumed to be raised by his father and grandmother, who had low income. Badawi attended school until the age of thirteen when his father reported him for parental disobedience, a crime in Saudi Arabia, and spent six months in a teenage detention centre: subsequent bullying, Wahhabi indoctrination, and flogging caused him to be scarred deeply.

== Free Saudi Liberals ==
=== Influence by reading and Diwaniya ===
Badawi started an online forum known as "Saudi Liberal Network" on 13 August 2006.

He was influenced by numerous books by Arab authors who refused to view the world from a purely religious standpoint, including The Universe Judges God by Abdullah al-Qasemi, Arab Culture in the Age of Globalization by Turki al-Hamad, and Prisoner 32 by Mohammed Saeed Tayeb, an author whom Raif admires deeply and who had taken him under his wing.

Additionally he was influenced by Diwaniya, a traditional evening meeting of journalists, poets, thinkers, philosophers, and authors who all shared and discussed the dream of a more open, tolerant, secular, and liberal society in Saudi Arabia. Raif frequented these meetings where he expressed his hopes for the development of civil society and the lessening of oppression in the name of religion. He sought to make Saudi citizens aware of their rights and responsibilities so that they would demand their rights.

=== Headlines, apostasy, indirect criticism, and the Mutawwa ===
Badawi's blog made headlines soon after it went online, as it was a space where Saudis could openly speak about liberalism in a conservative country where the king was known as the custodian of the two holiest sites of Islam, Mecca and Medina. He said (in Arabic), "To me, liberalism means simply to live and let live." Very few Saudis dared to publicly speak about liberalism, because (under the prevailing Saudi interpretation of Islam) it constitutes apostasy, a crime punishable by death; but Raif believed that freedom was worth the risk of such a sacrifice.

On his blog Badawi protested actions of the Mutawwa (the "religious police"), but never directly criticized them. He also never directly criticized the Saudi Government, as he considered himself a patriot and admired the King of Saudi Arabia. Posts on his blog primarily questioned and challenged the established rules of the kingdom, such as why women needed a male guardian to walk down the street or why it was so difficult for women to access the labor market and employment. Badawi also questioned the logic of requiring all Saudis to believe in Islam. Despite his Muslim faith, he stated that Islam cannot explain everything and people should be free to believe in whatever religion they choose to follow. He explained to others in a Diwaniya meeting that they are human beings and that they have the right to express themselves and think what they want to.

By the end of 2007, Badawi's blog had at least 2,000 members that debated on the methods of governing Saudi Arabia. Badawi's writings were not tolerated by the religious police who arrested him in late 2007. For many hours Badawi was interrogated regarding his activities, but was eventually released with no charges made against him. Unsatisfied by the interrogation, the religious police made a surprise raid at Badawi's home a few days later to search for forbidden books, but left with nothing. The religious police began to interrogate Badawi frequently, frightening his wife, Ensaf Haidar, despite Badawi's frequent attempts to reassure her that the interrogations would not lead to charges and punishment, and that the police had nothing on him.

== Trials and sentences ==
=== Arrest, trial and first sentence ===
First detained on apostasy charges in 2008, Badawi was released after a day of questioning. He was prevented from leaving Saudi Arabia, and both his and his wife's bank accounts were frozen in 2009. The family of Badawi's wife subsequently filed a court action to forcibly divorce the couple on grounds of Badawi's alleged apostasy. On 17 June 2012, he was arrested on a charge of "insulting Islam through electronic channels", and the following December he was also cited for apostasy, a conviction which carries an automatic death sentence. However, Badawi was confirmed to be a Muslim after reciting the Shahada in court, and also stated that people should have the right to choose their faith. Human Rights Watch stated that Badawi's website had hosted material criticizing "senior religious figures". Badawi had also suggested that Imam Muhammad ibn Saud Islamic University had become "a den for terrorists."

Following the 2012 arrest, Amnesty International designated Badawi a prisoner of conscience, "detained solely for peacefully exercising his right to freedom of expression", and said: "Even in Saudi Arabia where state repression is rife, it is beyond the pale to seek the death penalty for an activist whose only 'crime' was to enable social debate online". Calling for the government to drop the charges, Human Rights Watch stated: "The charges against him, based solely to Badawi's involvement in setting up a website for peaceful discussion about religion and religious figures, violate his right to freedom of expression". Moroccan human rights activist Kacem El Ghazzali also criticized Saudi Arabia authority.

Charged with "setting up a website that undermines general security", "ridiculing Islamic religious figures", and "going beyond the realm of obedience", Badawi appeared before a district court in Jeddah on 17 December 2012. The judge referred the charge of apostasy to a higher court, saying he "could not give a verdict in a case of apostasy." On 22 December, the General Court in Jeddah found merits in the apostasy charges. And then it referred the case back to the lower court, as the latter is said to require the wisdom of higher court to try apostasy.

On 30 July 2013, Saudi media reported that Badawi had been sentenced to seven years in prison and 600 lashes for founding an Internet forum that "violates Islamic values and propagates liberal thought". The court also ordered the website closed.

=== Sentence increased ===
On 26 December 2013, Badawi's wife Ensaf Haidar told CNN a judge had ruled that her husband should go before a high court for the apostasy charge which would result in a death penalty if convicted. On 7 May 2014, Badawi's sentence was increased to 1000 lashes, 10 years in prison, and a fine of ر.س 1,000,000 (equivalent to about US$267,000 at the time and US$363,000 currently) for "insulting Islam". In mid-January 2015, the case was passed to the Saudi Supreme Court for review. On 1 March 2015, Badawi's wife told reporters that judges in Saudi Arabia's criminal court wanted to retry him for apostasy, and that if found guilty he would be sentenced to death.

== Ensaf Haidar takes refuge in Canada ==
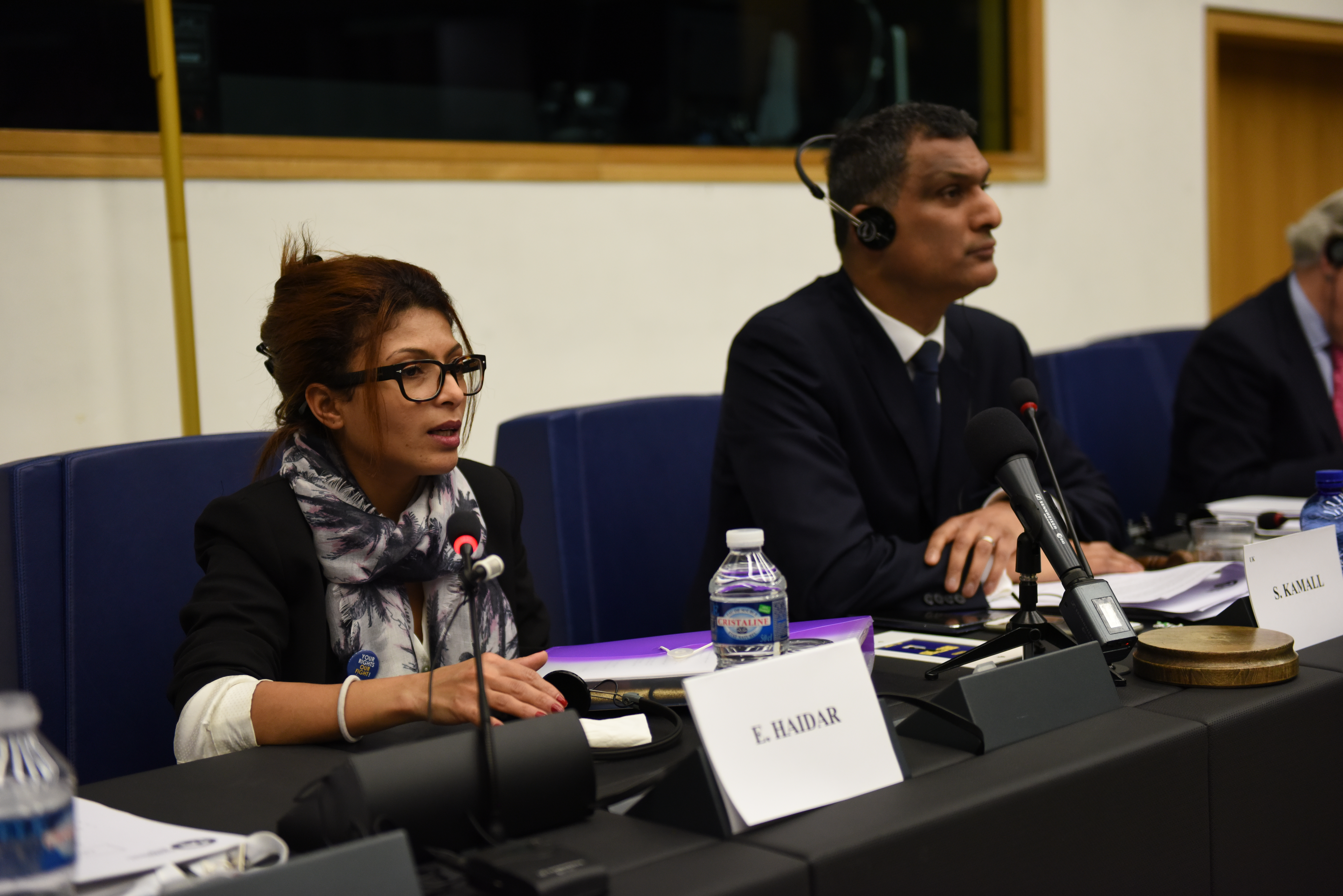
Ensaf Haidar, wife of Raif Badawi speaking in 2015

A few days after a court hearing, Badawi's wife Ensaf Haidar started receiving anonymous death threats. She fled to Sherbrooke in Quebec, Canada with their three children. On 27 January 2015, Canadian politician Marc Garneau announced in an opinion piece that he and his political colleague Irwin Cotler would "[assist] Badawi's wife in her efforts to save her husband." Addressing the UN Human Rights Council as a representative of the International Humanist and Ethical Union (IHEU), Kacem El Ghazzali criticized Saudi Arabia for sentencing Badawi to 7 years in prison and 600 lashes (since increased to 1000 lashes, 10 years in prison, and a fine of ر.س 1,000,000), calling it a "gratuitous, violent sentence".

== Prosecution and imprisonment of Badawi's lawyer ==
Badawi's lawyer Waleed Abulkhair (also transcribed as Abu al-Khair) was imprisoned after setting up Monitor of Human Rights in Saudi Arabia, a Saudi human rights organization. He is charged with "setting up an unlicensed organization" and "breaking allegiance with the ruler". His requests to license the organization were denied. On 7 July 2014, Abulkhair was sentenced to 15 years imprisonment, followed by a 15-year travel ban. The Specialized Criminal Court in Jeddah found him guilty of "undermining the regime and officials", "inciting public opinion", and "insulting the judiciary".

Abulkhair told BBC that Badawi had confirmed in court that he was a Muslim and had told the judge, "Everyone has a choice to believe or not believe."

== Public flogging ==
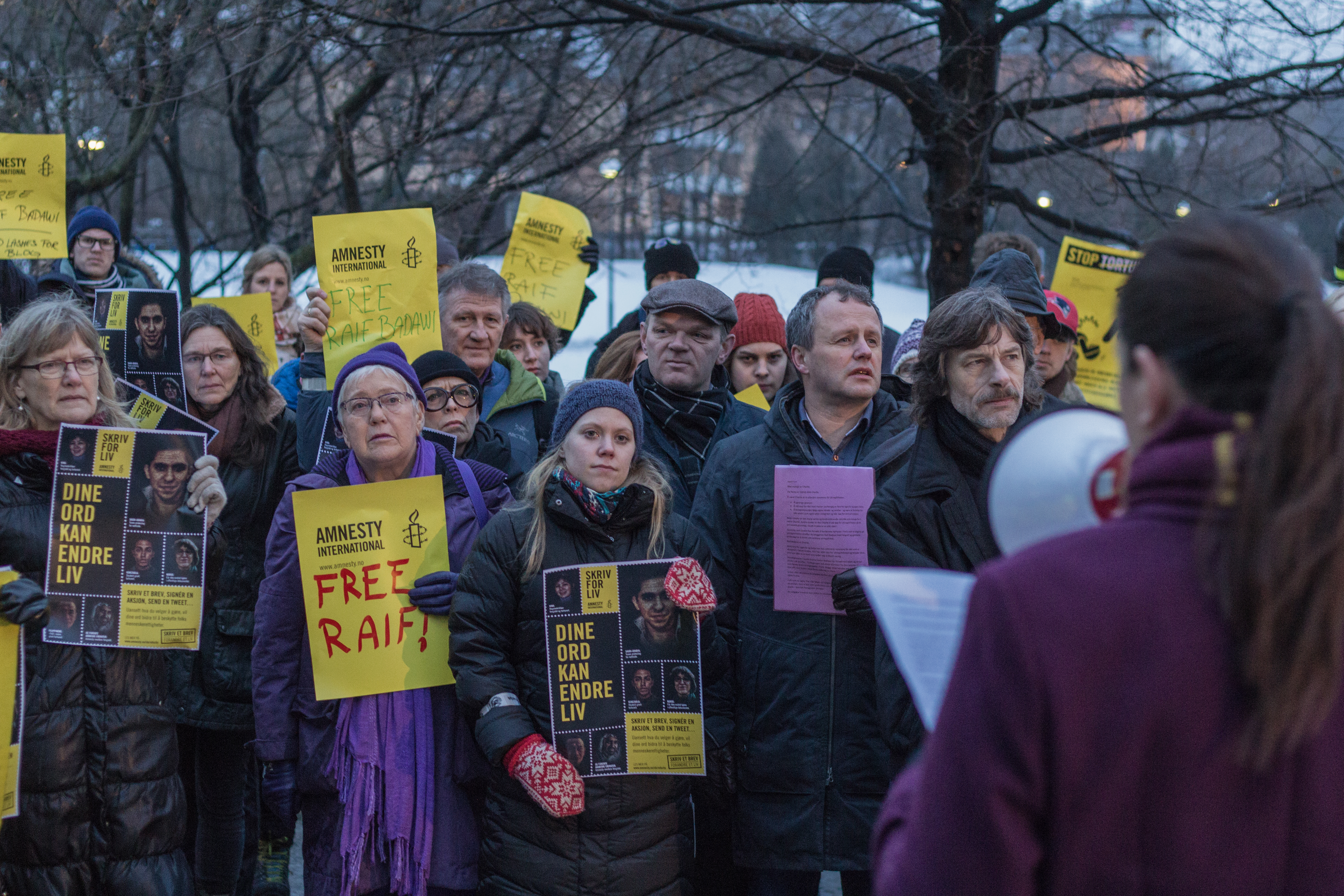
A group protests against the flogging of Badawi outside the Royal Embassy of Saudi Arabia in Oslo, Norway, 16 January 2015

On 9 January 2015, Badawi received 50 lashes before hundreds of spectators in front of a Jeddah mosque, the first of a total of 1,000 lashes to be administered over twenty weeks. The incident was condemned by Amnesty International's Deputy Director for the Middle East and North Africa, Said Boumedouha: "The flogging of Raif Badawi is a vicious act of cruelty which is prohibited under international law. By ignoring international calls to cancel the flogging, Saudi Arabia's authorities have demonstrated an abhorrent disregard for the most basic human rights principles." Prince Zeid bin Ra'ad of Jordan said: "Such punishment is prohibited under international human rights law, in particular the convention against torture, which Saudi Arabia has ratified. I appeal to the king of Saudi Arabia to exercise his power to halt the public flogging by pardoning Mr Badawi, and to urgently review this type of extraordinarily harsh penalty". Sebastian Usher, Middle East analyst for the BBC said he suspected that Saudi leaders had been unprepared for the scale of international protest in response to the flogging. In May 2022, photographer John Elliott, a former U.S. State Department official stationed in Jeddah and who witnessed the 2015 flogging, released the only two photographs documenting the public spectacle. Included with the photos were extensive and hitherto unrevealed details of the experience.

Raif Badawi's wife Ensaf Haidar said after hearing about the flogging: "What I felt was indescribable. It was an indescribable mixture of sadness and pain [...] It was painfully horrible to imagine what was happening to Raif." She also said, "I appreciate all the attention that Raif's case has been getting. I hope that all the governments in the world will intensify their efforts to pressure the authorities to stop what they intend doing [sic] to my husband. I believe they can do it, if they speak directly to the government in Saudi". Further lashings were postponed because the injuries from the first had not healed and Badawi was in poor medical condition. Badawi is a diabetic with a slim build. He was to receive the punishment 50 lashes at a time every Friday for 20 weeks until the sentence was complete.

=== International reaction ===
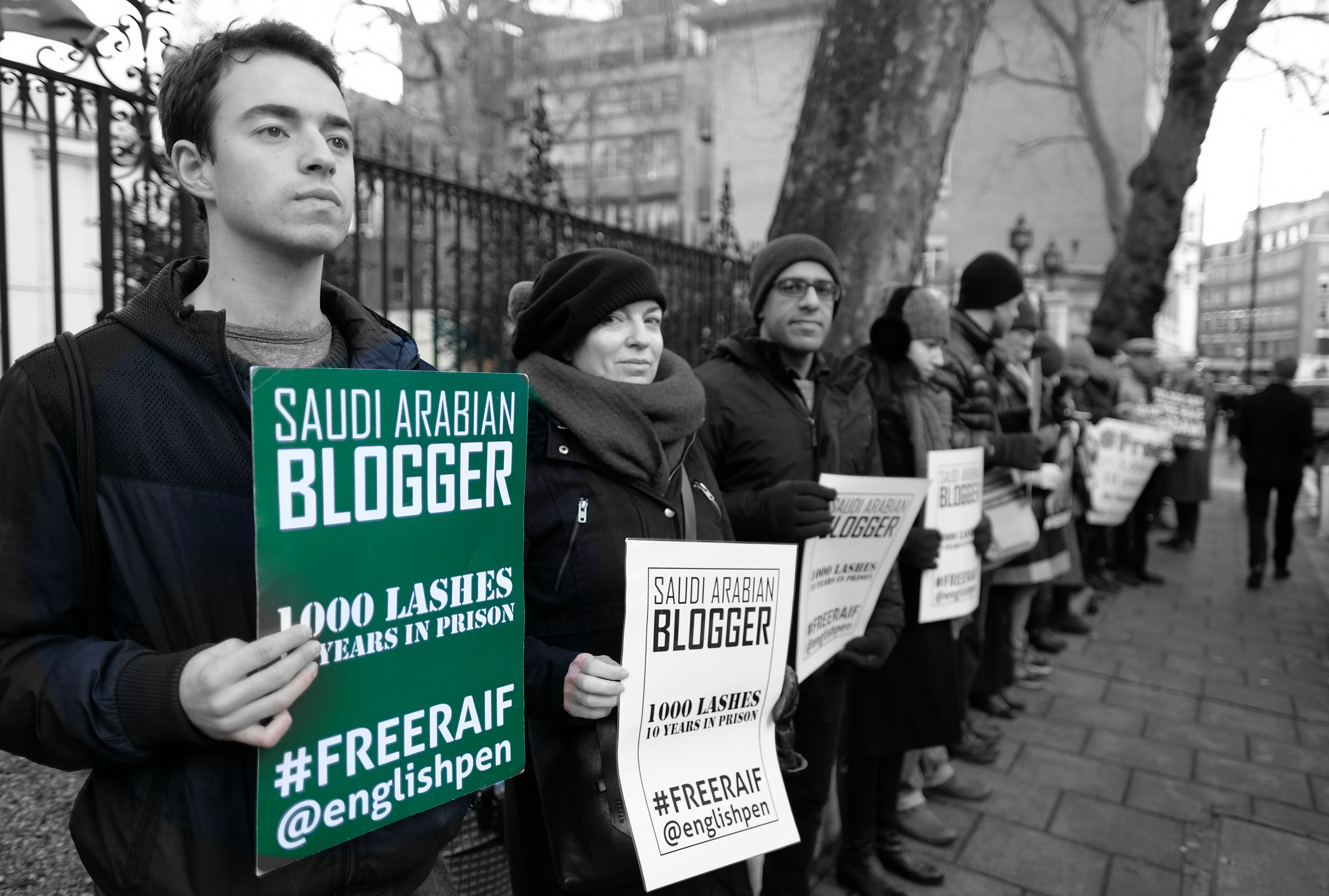
A protest outside the Saudi Arabian Embassy in London, 13 January 2017

There was an international campaign to free Badawi, comprising street protests, petitions, letters, and social media activity. The hashtag "JeSuisRaif", echoing Je suis Charlie, trended in January 2015. The readiness of some Saudi doctors to perform medical assessments prior to floggings has been questioned, and described as doctors participating in acts of torture. UK Foreign Secretary Philip Hammond raised the issue with the Saudi ambassador for the United Kingdom, and a Foreign Office spokesperson said: "We are seriously concerned by Raif Badawi's case. The UK condemns the use of cruel, inhuman or degrading punishment in all circumstances."

Eighteen Nobel laureates signed an open letter urging Saudi academics to condemn the flogging of Badawi. The Independent commented that many leading western scientists, uneasy about working with Saudi academics because of the "inexcusable" human rights situation there, may refuse to work with Saudis if the open letter is disregarded.

As of 22 January 2015, Amnesty International's petition to release Badawi from prison had nearly 800,000 signatories. Badawi was again a trending topic on Twitter a week later and his wife told the BBC that the family suffered "perpetual anxiety". Urging Canadian Prime Minister Stephen Harper to intervene with Saudi authorities, she also told an all-party group of Canadian Members of Parliament that "Raif's health condition is getting worse and worse" according to several doctors who had examined her husband in the previous week, and that she was "very concerned about him. It is impossible for a human being to be able to withstand 50 lashes weekly."

After the second series of lashes was postponed for the third time on 30 January 2015, with no reason given, there was hope that Badawi might be released. On 5 February 2015, it was reported that he had appeared in court the day before the next scheduled flogging. Amnesty and others again expressed concern. In Québec, where Badawi's family now live as refugees, and where his situation is seen as symbolic of the worldwide struggle for free speech, the public have taken up his case and protests in Sherbrooke and elsewhere are regular. The flogging was postponed a fourth time, with the postponement announced close to the scheduled time, keeping Badawi and those concerned about him in suspense. The following week, the National Assembly of Québec unanimously passed a motion condemning Badawi's flogging and calling on the governments of Québec and Canada to do everything possible to secure his freedom. By the end of February, the next flogging had been postponed seven times.

Sixty-seven members of the United States Congress sent a bipartisan letter to the King of Saudi Arabia on 3 March 2015, calling for the release of all prisoners of conscience, including Raif Badawi and Waleed Abu Al-Khair. The same day, South Africa's Archbishop Desmond Tutu sent a letter to King Salman in support of Badawi, saying "We are all members of faiths that underscore mercy and forgiveness." On 6 March, a group of Northern Ireland trade union leaders including journalists Eamonn McCann and Felicity McCall published an open letter in the Belfast Telegraph condemning the "barbaric punishment" of Raif Badawi and calling for his release, and German journalist Constantin Schreiber announced that Badawi's first book would be published in April.

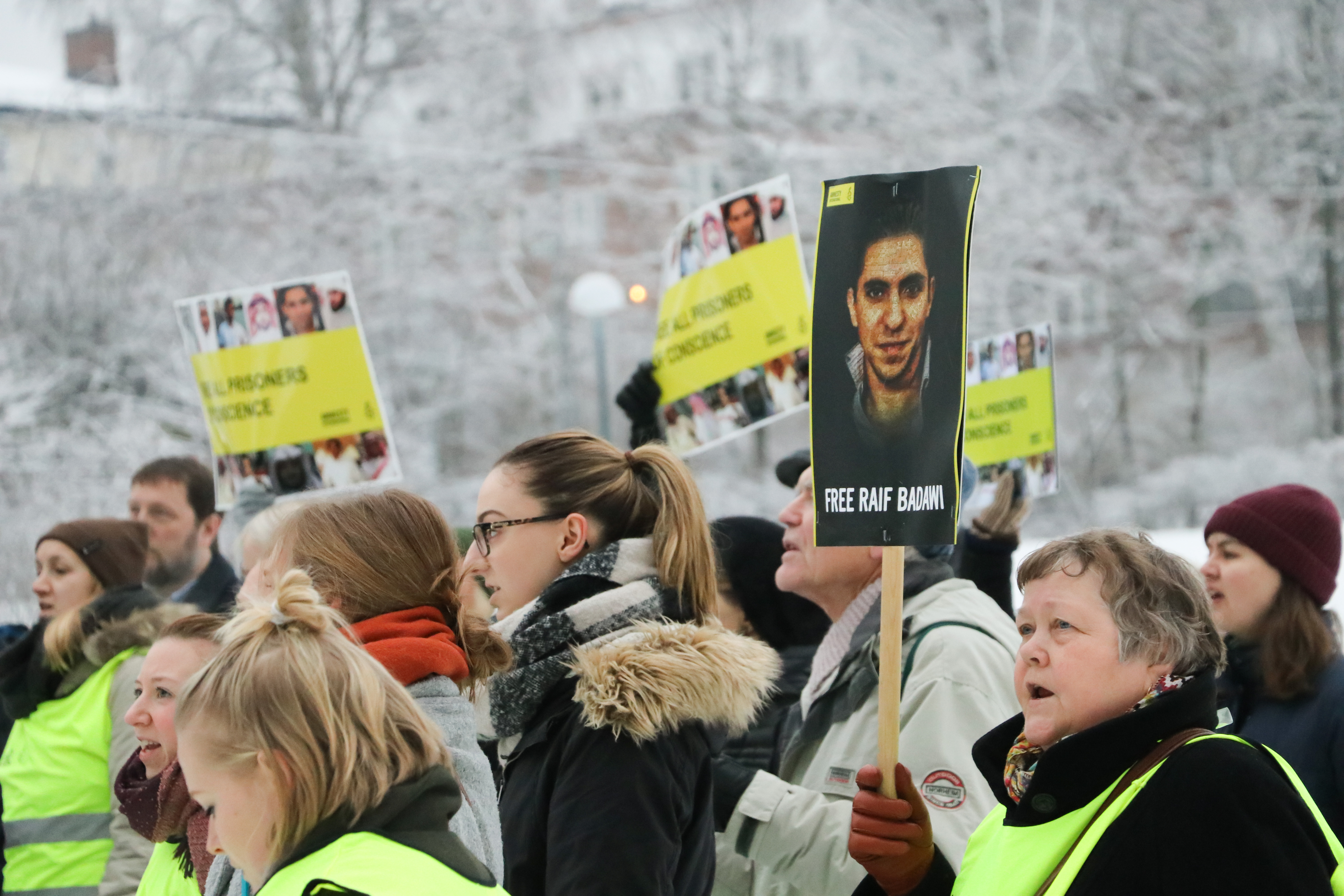
Oslo protest against Saudi Arabia's detention of Badawi, 3 February 2017

In early March 2015, Ensaf Haidar petitioned Sigmar Gabriel, Germany's Vice-Chancellor and Minister of Economic Affairs, to use his influence to free Badawi during an upcoming visit to Saudi Arabia. Katrin Göring-Eckardt, a German parliamentary leader, also called on Gabriel to bring up the case during his visit. As Gabriel left for Saudi Arabia on 7 March, protesters at the airport urged him to support Badawi. Gabriel said he intended to broach the subject of Badawi with the royal family. In Riyadh he told reporters, "I think it's quite normal that people the world over are interested in something like this. And that shouldn't surprise anyone here." He added, "The harshness of this sentence, especially the corporal punishment, is something unimaginable for us, and of course it weighs on our relations (with Saudi Arabia)." The Saudi Arabian government responded by rejecting criticism of its human rights record and asserting that "it does not accept interference in any form in its internal affairs."

Sweden's foreign minister, Margot Wallström, has spoken publicly about Badawi's case and other Saudi Arabian human rights issues. In March 2015, Saudi Arabia blocked Wallström's speech at an Arab League meeting in Cairo to which she had been invited as an honorary guest. Sweden then cancelled its longstanding arms agreement with Saudi Arabia. German news magazine Der Spiegel reported in March that Badawi had written from prison that he "miraculously survived 50 lashes [...] [while he was] surrounded by a cheering crowd who cried incessantly 'Allahu Akbar' ('God is greatest')". Protests and vigils outside Saudi embassies continued.

On 6 August 2018, Saudi Arabia expelled the Canadian ambassador Dennis Horak, and froze all trade with Ottawa. This came after the Canada's Minister of Foreign Affairs Chrystia Freeland, expressed concern over the arrest of Samar Badawi, a human rights activist in Saudi Arabia and sister of Raif Badawi, and demanded the release of both Samar and Raif.

In July 2019, U.S. Vice President Mike Pence urged Saudi Arabia to free Badawi.

=== Renewed threat of flogging in 2015 ===
Wikipedia co-founder Jimmy Wales calls for Badawi's freedom on 17 June 2015 "Day of Action for Raif".

The Saudi Supreme Court upheld the sentence and there were fears Badawi could be flogged again after Friday prayers on 12 June 2015. The punishment was delayed again, hours before it was due to be inflicted. Badawi's wife believes he is in poor physical and psychological health, and fears his sentence may be "a slow death".

=== Renewed threat of flogging in 2016 ===
The Independent reported in October 2016 that sources close to Badawi's family feared flogging could restart imminently, at any time during the year. Governments with ties to Saudi Arabia were urged to make representations on Badawi's behalf. Ensaf Haidar, Badawi's wife said, "I was totally shocked by the news. I'm worried and scared that they'll carrying [sic] on whipping him. (...) I'm concerned about Raif's health, which is not good—either mentally or physically. I really hope that Saudi Arabia will not go ahead and implement the sentence. I would hope that the Saudi authorities strip Raif of his citizenship and then deport him to Canada to be with us." Badawi has reportedly been on sustained hunger strike at least twice. Then Canadian Foreign Affairs Minister Stephane Dion said "We are trying to have the most accurate information possible, because if this information is true, it would be shameful. Canada completely condemns this type of lashing."

=== Release ===
On 11 March 2022, his family reported that Badawi was released from prison, but not allowed to leave the country. With the support of the Giordano Bruno Foundation and other organizations, a GoFundMe campaign was created to help Badawi's family raise funds to cover the fines imposed on him prior to his release.

== Personal life ==
Raif Badawi met his wife, Ensaf Haidar, accidentally when Badawi misdialed Haidar. Haidar called back, under the presumption that it was a call from a job agency offering her a teaching position at a Madrasa. Badawi called back Haidar repeatedly to her anger because of her "lovely voice", and Haidar repeatedly declined out of fear for family honour. Haidar eventually began to talk to Badawi in secret, prompting one of Haidar's brothers to steal her phone and Badawi to travel to Jizan, Haidar's hometown, and give her another phone in secret and a rose.

Raif Badawi married Ensaf Haidar in 2002 in Saudi Arabia, with Haidar giving birth in 2003 at the Jeddah Public Hospital to their first child, Najwa bint Raif Badawi, in his absence. In the following year, Haidar gave birth to their son, Doudi "Tirad" bin Raif Badawi, in 2004 in Badawi's presence; as well as the birth of their second daughter, Miriyam bint Raif Badawi in 2007.

Badawi and Haidar lived in Jizan with their children until Haidar's brothers began to harass her and demand her to divorce from Badawi, prompting their move to Jeddah, a more liberal city. He was the founder and head of a women's education system until he sold it following his dissidence.

Badawi's wife and children were granted political asylum by the Government of Canada in 2013, where they now live.

Badawi is Muslim and has made Umrah with his three children. His wife denied allegations of apostasy and said in a NPR interview that he is a "good Muslim" and promoted a "live-and-let-live philosophy".

== Awards, honours and nominations ==
=== Awards ===
- Günter Wallraff Prize for journalism 2019, shared with European Journalism Observatory (EJO).
- International Laïcité Award 2018, by Comité Laïcité République shared with Ensaf Haidar.
- Daniel Pearl Award 2018, by Los Angeles Press Club.
- Montreal Press Club Freedom Award 2018.
- Liberty Victoria "Empty Chair" award 2016.
- Deschner Prize 2016, by the Giordano Bruno Foundation, shared with Ensaf Haidar
- Salam Prize for Peace (Frankfurt) 2016.
- Liberal International Prize for Freedom 2016.
- Prix Voltaire 2016, from IPA Freedom to Publish committee.
- Sakharov Prize 2015, from the European Parliament, for the defence of freedom of thought and human rights
- Swiss Freethinker Prize 2015, shared with Ensaf Haidar and Waleed Abulkhair
- Sir Karl Popper Prize 2015, from the Österreichischer Freidenkerbund
- PEN Pinter Prize 2015, shared with British poet and literary critic James Fenton
- Strasbourg Award Medal of Honor 2015
- Franco-German Journalism Prize 2015
- Thomas Dehler medal, from the Free Democratic Party, Germany
- Press Freedom Prize 2015, from Reporters Without Borders, Sweden
- Freedom of Speech Award 2015, from Deutsche Welle
- Courage Award 2015, from the Geneva Summit for Human Rights and Democracy
- Aikenhead Award 2015, from the Scottish Secular Society
- One Humanity Award 2014, from PEN Canada
- Netizen Prize 2014, from Reporters without Borders.

=== Honorifics ===
- The honorary membership 2019, by Cambridge Union shared with Ensaf Haidar.
- Honorary Doctorate, from Université de Sherbrooke
- Honorary citizenship Montreal
- Université de Sherbrooke university honored him by giving the master's program in law and int'l politics 2017–18 "DIPIA" his name.
- One of the Leading Global Thinkers of 2015, By Foreign Policy.
- One of the Boss List 2015, By AskMen.
- Honorary citizenship, Sherbrooke, Quebec
- Honorary Title for Freedom of Expression, bestowed by Brussels University Alliance (VUB and ULB), 2015.
- Honorary membership, PEN Canada.
- Honorary membership, PEN Denmark.
- Honorary membership, PEN Germany.
- Man of the Year 2015, By The Fifth Column.
- The honorary membership 2017, by Fédération professionnelle des journalistes du Québec.

=== Nominations ===
- Nobel Peace Prize, 2015
- Nobel Peace Prize, 2016
- 2014 Freedom Award, from Spain's Individual Freedom Party (P-LIB)
- Freedom to Publish Prize 2014, from the International Publishers Association.

== Books ==
- Badawi, Raif; Schreiber, Constantin, editor; Hetzl, Sandra, translator, 1000 Peitschenhiebe : weil ich sage, was ich denke [1000 Lashes: Because I Say What I Think]. Ullstein, Berlin 2015, ISBN 978-3-550-08120-0 (germ.)
- Badawi, Raif; Schreiber, Constantin, editor; Ahmad Danny Ramadan, translator, 1000 Lashes: Because I Say What I Think. Vancouver 2015, ISBN 978-1771642095 (Canada)

== See also ==
- Human rights in Saudi Arabia
- Legal system of Saudi Arabia
- Religion in Saudi Arabia § Irreligion, Irreligion in Saudi Arabia
