= SciTech - Our World Tomorrow =

- سايتك عالمنا غداً
- Countries of origin: Germany; Egypt; Oman
- No. of seasons: 3
- No. of episodes: 10 (2012); 24 (2013); 24 (2014)

Production
- Running time: 20-30 minutes
- Production companies: Boekamp & Kriegsheim GmbH

Original release
- Network: ONTV (Egypt); Sultanate of Oman Television
- Release: 2012 – present

SciTech - Our World Tomorrow (Arabic: سايتك عالمنا غداً) is the title of two separate but related German-Arabic science television series, one airing on the ONTV (Egypt) television network, the other airing on Oman TV.

The series is a collaboration between the German Federal Foreign Office, ONTV (Egypt) and Sultanate of Oman Television. The topics of the series deal with research and inventions in various fields such as energy, transport, environment and technology, with focus on Arabic-German collaborations. The series, hosted by the German journalist Constantin Schreiber in Arabic, is produced in Egypt, Oman and Germany and is broadcast monthly. A new feature in the second season is a talk (Arabic: لقاء الخبراء) in which experts and decision makers are interviewed.

The launch ceremony in Muscat was held in June 2012, under the auspices of Dr. Abdullah al Harrasi, chairman of the public authority for radio and television as well as the former German ambassador Angelika Storz-Chakarji. In Egypt, the series was launched on April 19, 2012.
