= Roderick Bell =

Canadian diplomat (1947–2014)

Roderick Bell (October 6, 1947 - March 29, 2014) was a Canadian diplomat.

In 1976 he was Second Secretary next the Headquarters of the United Nations.

In 1995 he was acting director Federation Ombudsmen of the Organization for Security and Co-operation in Europe. From 1997 to 2000 he was director of the unit "United Nations & Commonwealth Affairs. From 2003 to 2007 he was Ambassador Extraordinary and Plenipotentiary to Saudi Arabia with concurrent accreditation to the Arab Republic of Yemen, Bahrain and Oman. From 2000 to 2003 he was Ambassador Extraordinary and Plenipotentiary to JordanAmbassador Roderick L. Bell. (Also covers Iraq.) .

Diplomatic posts
Preceded by Michael J. Molloy	Ambassador Extraordinary and Plenipotentiary to Jordan; 2000-2003	Succeeded by John T. Holmes
Preceded by Melvyn MacDonald	Ambassador Extraordinary and Plenipotentiary to Saudi Arabia; 2003-August 31, 2007	Succeeded by Ronald Davidson
Preceded by Melvyn MacDonald	Ambassador Extraordinary and Plenipotentiary to the Arab Republic of Yemen; 2003-2007	Succeeded by Ronald Davidson
Preceded by Daniel Edward Hobson	Ambassador Extraordinary and Plenipotentiary to the Bahrain; 2003-2007	Succeeded by Ronald Davidson
Preceded by Melvyn MacDonald	Ambassador Extraordinary and Plenipotentiary to the Oman; 2003-2007	Succeeded by Ronald Davidson
