= Constantin Schreiber =

German journalist (born 1979)

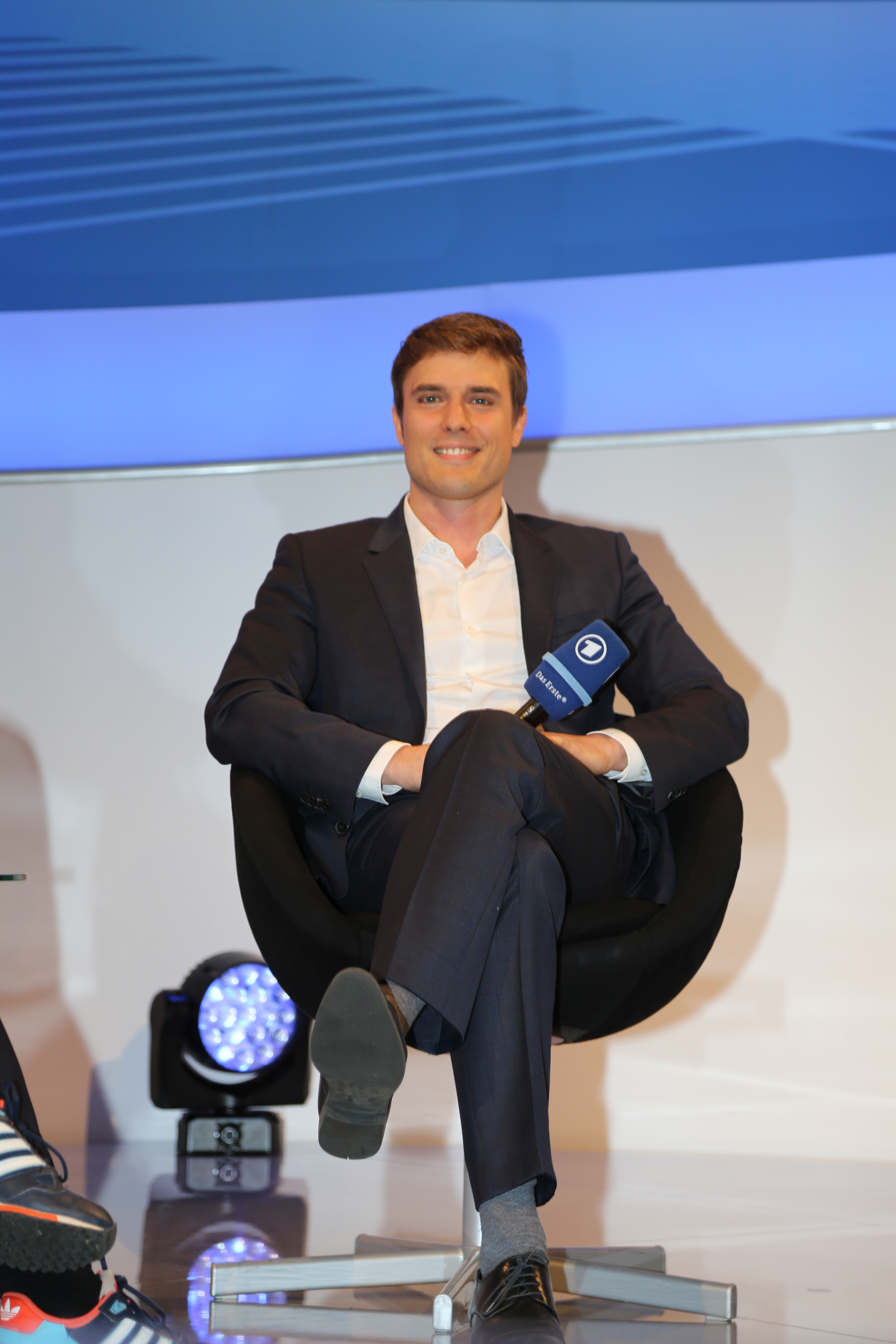
- Schreiber in 2016
- Born: 14 June 1979 (age 46); Cuxhaven, West Germany
- Occupations: News presenter; journalist
- Known for: Anchorman at the ARD (2017–2025)

Constantin Schreiber (born 14 June 1979) is a German journalist working for German and Arabic language TV stations.

== Life ==
Constantin Schreiber was born in Cuxhaven. As a teenager, Schreiber learned Arabic while spending time in Syria. He holds a law degree and worked as a journalist for the Lebanese newspaper Daily Star from 2006 to 2007. After that, he was a news correspondent for Deutsche Welle in Dubai and accompanied German Chancellor Angela Merkel on her first trip through the Middle East. From 2009 to 2011, Schreiber served as a media consultant for the Middle East at the German Federal Foreign Ministry.

Since 2012, Schreiber has worked as a host and Middle East expert for the German TV channel n-tv. In addition, he also hosts the German-Arabic TV series SciTech - Our World Tomorrow which is aired on ONTV (Egypt) and Sultanate of Oman Television.

In January 2017, Schreiber switched to ARD aktuell, where he hosted the early and weekend editions of the Tagesschau, as well as the Nachtmagazin. From March 2017 to December 2020, Schreiber also hosted the NDR program Zapp – Das Medienmagazin as the successor of Inka Schneider.

In 2017, his German book Inside Islam. Was in Deutschlands Moscheen gepredigt wird. (English translation: Inside Islam – What's Preached in Germany's Mosques) appeared in the German Econ Verlag as well as the TV series Moscheereport (English translation: Mosque Report) on tagesschau24. For the research of these two works, Schreiber and a camera crew visited almost 20 ordinary mosques in Germany and translated their Khutbah. The research was harshly criticized by the German newspaper Die Tageszeitung in March 2017 and German radio station Deutschlandfunk Kultur in April 2017.

In September 2020, it was announced that he and Julia-Niharika Sen would be part of the news team of the 8 p.m. Tagesschau from 2021. He read his first 8 p.m. edition on 4 January 2021, and he last time hosted on 25 May 2025, because he announced his departure from this news program because he has been assigned a new job on television.

Schreiber lives in Hamburg with his wife and two children.

== Writing ==
Schreiber is the author of:

- Ausverkauf Deutschland. Wie ausländische Investoren unser Land übernehmen., Econ Verlag, Berlin, 2010. ISBN 978-3-430-20095-0.
- 1000 Peitschenhiebe. Weil ich sage, was ich denke. Ullstein Buchverlag, 2015. ISBN 978-3-550-08120-0.
- Marhaba, Flüchtling! Im Dialog mit arabischen Flüchtlingen. Hoffmann und Campe, Hamburg 2016. ISBN 978-3-455-50411-8.
- Inside Islam. Was in Deutschlands Moscheen gepredigt wird. Econ Verlag, Berlin, 2017. ISBN 978-3-430-20218-3.
- Kinder des Koran. Was muslimische Schüler lernen. Econ Verlag, Berlin, 2019, ISBN 978-3-430-20250-3.
- Die Kandidatin. Hoffmann und Campe, Hamburg, 2021, ISBN 978-3-455-01064-0.
