= William Sampson (author) =

Canadian author (1959–2012)

- Born: 17 April 1959; Middleton, Nova Scotia, Canada
- Died: 28 March 2012 (aged 52); United Kingdom
- Occupations: Biochemist, writer
- Writing career
- Pen name: Bill
- Genre: Non-fiction

William Sampson (17 April 1959 – 28 March 2012) was a dual British and Canadian national who was arrested in Saudi Arabia on 17 December 2000 on a variety of charges including terrorism, espionage and murder. He was imprisoned and tortured for two years and seven months, and finally released and permitted to leave Saudi Arabia, along with several of his co-accused, on 8 August 2003.

In 2005 Sampson published a book about his experience entitled Confessions of an Innocent Man: Torture and Survival in a Saudi Prison.

== Early life ==
Sampson was born at Soldiers Memorial Hospital in Middleton, Nova Scotia, Canada. The son of a British father and a Canadian mother, Sampson spent periods in Canada, the United Kingdom and Singapore. At age 16 he joined the Seaforth Highlanders militia in Vancouver. He stayed on for 18 months. He held an MBA from the University of Edinburgh and a PhD in biochemistry.

He worked in biochemical research and pharmaceutical marketing prior to moving to Riyadh in 1998 to work as a marketing consultant with the Saudi Industrial Development Fund, a government development bank.

== Arrest ==
On the morning of 17 December 2000, Sampson was taken at gunpoint by police as he left his home in Riyadh on his way to work. He was taken to al-Ha'ir Prison where regular sessions of physical and psychological torture immediately began. Among other things, Sampson says he was raped by two men and repeatedly beaten, foot whipped, and deprived of sleep.

After six initial days of torture largely conducted by three men, Ibrahim al-Dali (officer of the Mabaheth, the Saudi Arabian internal intelligence service), Khaled al-Saleh (officer of the Mabaheth) and a third unnamed man Sampson nicknamed "the Spiv," Sampson confessed and subsequently provided both written and videotaped confessions; he was sentenced to death by al-haad, a form of execution in which the victim is restrained and decapitated. The torture continued in various forms until his release.

A Saudi official has denied that Sampson was tortured.

== Alleged crimes ==
Sampson was one of nine foreign nationals arrested on allegations of involvement in a series of car bombings targeting Western expatriates in Riyadh. British engineer Christopher Rodway was killed and his wife injured in one explosion, and a second bomb injured Britons Mark Paine and Steve Coughlan. The Saudi authorities claimed that the bombings were part of a turf war within a Western liquor trafficking ring, though the men claimed they were further forced to confess. The widow of Christopher Rodway, Jane Rodway, denied that her husband was involved in liquor trafficking.

In his videotaped confession, broadcast internationally on 5 February 2001, Sampson said:

I admit and acknowledge that I participated with Mr. Alexander Mitchell in setting up an explosive device on the vehicle belonging to Mr. Christopher Rodway, a British national. I detonated the explosive device using a remote control switch. Mr. Mitchell and I then headed South towards Al-Jazeera. Two days later, Mr. Mitchell ordered me to set up a second explosion with the participation of Mr. Raf Schyvens, a Belgian national.

— William Sampson

== Release ==
In August 2003, after 31 months' incarceration in solitary confinement, Sampson and the others were suddenly released, and immediately deported to the UK. Charles, Prince of Wales, Rubin Carter, Christopher Rodway's son Justin Rodway, and Canadian members of parliament, Stéphane Dion and Dan McTeague were part of the diplomatic effort to obtain the release. In July 2004, it was revealed that the final release was part of a prisoner exchange for the release of five Saudis from the US prison camp in Guantanamo Bay, Cuba. Officials of both the Foreign and Commonwealth Office (UK) and the State Department (USA) have anonymously confirmed this information. A memorandum between officials of the Belgian Ministry of Foreign Affairs referring to the prisoner exchange adds further evidence of its occurrence. The Belgian government has confirmed both the authenticity of the memo and its knowledge of the exchange, but has denied any direct involvement in the negotiations. The Canadian government refuses to comment on the matter.

== Legal case ==
On 28 October 2004, Sampson, along with Britons Sandy Mitchell and Les Walker, won a legal battle in London, UK that allows them to sue the men in Saudi Arabia they say tortured them into making the false confessions. In February 2005, a coroner's inquest into the death of Christopher Rodway, held in Trowbridge, concluded that there was no evidence to indicate that Sampson and Mitchell had any involvement in the death, and thus were not involved in the incident for which the Saudi Arabian government had arrested them. In June 2006, a decision handed down at the Law Lords overturned the earlier ruling of the Court of Appeal. Sampson, along with Mitchell and Walker appealed to the European Court of Human Rights claiming that the law in Britain, as interpreted in the Lords' decision, is a violation of their rights under Article 6 (right to a fair trial) of the European Convention on Human Rights.

In June 2006 the group's appeal was overturned by the Law Lords on the grounds that Saudi officials are protected in Britain by the State Immunity Act 1978.

In 2007, Sampson was the subject of a National Film Board of Canada-co-produced documentary.

== Criticism of the Canadian government ==
Sampson repeatedly criticised the Canadian government for its actions during his incarceration. Sampson stated that his torturers were present at every meeting he had with Canadian diplomats and government representatives, who never insisted they leave and indeed accepted the Saudis' claims of Sampson's guilt, despite the lack of evidence, inconsistencies, and the statements to the contrary by Sampson and his supporters. He also alleged that he repeatedly informed embassy officials and Canadian medical professionals that he was being tortured, but to no avail.

Credible allegations that [Sampson] was tortured while in detention and forced to confess to a crime he very likely did not commit remain uninvestigated [by Canadian authorities].

— Amnesty International

== Death ==
Sampson died of a heart attack at his home in northern England on 28 March 2012. According to Marni Soupcof, writing in the National Post, at the time of his death Canada was still failing Sampson. She criticized Canadian diplomatic officials for asking Sampson about torture when his torturers were present, and failing to realise he couldn't answer candidly. She rejected claims Canada had learned a lesson in being pro-active in protecting its citizens in custody overseas.

== See also ==
- Mohamed Kohail
- Sandy Mitchell
