= State Immunity Act 1978 =

Act of the Parliament of the United Kingdom

State Immunity Act 1978 (Note: Section 23(1).)
- Act of Parliament
- Parliament of the United Kingdom
- Long title: An Act to make new provision with respect to proceedings in the United Kingdom by or against other States; to provide for the effect of judgments given against the United Kingdom in the courts of States parties to the European Convention on State Immunity; to make new provision with respect to the immunities and privileges of heads of State; and for connected purposes.
- Citation: 1978 c. 33
- Introduced by: Peter Archer MP, Solicitor-General (Commons); Lord Elwyn-Jones, Lord Chancellor (Lords)
- Territorial extent: United Kingdom (Note: Section 23(6).)

Dates
- Royal assent: 20 July 1978
- Commencement: 22 November 1978 (Note: Section 23(5). The State Immunity Act 1978 (Commencement) Order 1978 (SI 1978/1572).)

Other legislation
- Amends: Administration of Justice (Miscellaneous Provisions) Act 1938; Law Reform (Miscellaneous Provisions) (Scotland) Act 1940
- Amended by: British Nationality Act 1981; Hong Kong (British Nationality) Order 1986; Transfer of Functions (Secretary of State for Foreign, Commonwealth and Development Affairs) Order 2020; State Immunity Act 1978 (Remedial) Order 2023

Status: Amended

Text of statute as originally enacted

Revised text of statute as amended

Text of the State Immunity Act 1978 as in force today (including any amendments) within the United Kingdom, from legislation.gov.uk.

The State Immunity Act 1978 (c. 33) is an act of the Parliament of the United Kingdom relating to state immunity.

== Provisions ==
The act was passed to implement the 1926 Hague–Visby Rules, its 1934 protocol on the immunity of State-owned ships, the Brussels Convention European Convention on State Immunity of 1972 into British law. The act also codified the law relating to the immunity of any state in the courts of the United Kingdom. The doctrine of absolute state immunity was changed to one of restricted immunity, whereby a foreign state could be sued in the British courts for some certain activities, usually of a commercial nature.

In 1998 the defence attempted to use it during Chilean dictator Augusto Pinochet's arrest and trial, but Lord Nicholls said that the Act flouted a battery of international legislation on human rights abuses to which Britain is a signatory, and would have meant, according to the arguments of Pinochet's legal team, that British law would have protected even Adolf Hitler.

In June 2006 the law was used to dismiss an appeal by three Britons, Sandy Mitchell, Les Walker and Ron Jones, and Canadian William Sampson who had been convicted and imprisoned for car bombings and illicit alcohol trading in Saudi Arabia. The Law Lords upheld an appeal by the government of Saudi Arabia against the four men who wished to sue the Saudi government for damages relating to alleged torture. The four continue to maintain that they were mistreated by Saudi officials both before and after they were jailed in November 2000. They were released from prison in 2003 on royal pardon.

In 2017 the Court of Appeal held that the employment rights of two Sudanese embassy workers were within the scope of the EU-derived Working Time Regulations; a decision subsequently affirmed by the Supreme Court at UKSC 62. Under UK domestic law, sections 4 and 16 the State Immunity Act 1978 should have operated to protect the embassies' immunity from actions arising from contracts of employment, thus barring the employees' claims. However, once it was established that the matter fell within EU law, Article 47 of the Charter, granting the right to a fair trial, gave the Court of Appeal and the Supreme Court the power to 'protect' that right to the extent of overriding the inconsistent provisions of the 1978 act.

After the Bahrain government was alleged to have used malware to infect computers of and spy on two of its critics living in London, UK, the Bahrain government claimed sovereign immunity as protection from claims. Immunity was rejected by the High Court and the appeal court, which found that remote manipulation from abroad of a computer in the UK constituted an act within the UK—the territorial sovereignty of the UK had suffered interference. On losing the cases, Bahrain appealed to the Supreme Court, with the case pending as of November 2025. It was said that if Bahrain were to win, the ruling would help authoritarian countries to use digital spyware against political dissidents in the UK.
