= Ensaf Haidar =

Saudi Arabian human rights activist

- إنصاف حيدر
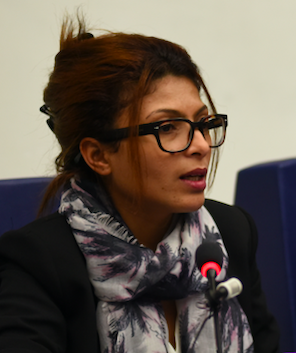
- Haidar in 2015
- Born: 1975 (age 50–51); Jizan, Saudi Arabia
- Occupations: Author, Human rights activist
- Political party: Bloc Québécois
- Spouse: Raif Badawi (m. 2002)
- Children: 3
- Relatives: Samar Badawi (sister-in-law)

Ensaf Haidar (Arabic: إنصاف حيدر; born 1975) is a Saudi-Canadian human rights activist. Born in Jizan, Saudi Arabia, Haidar is married to Raif Badawi, a Saudi writer, dissident and activist who was sentenced to ten years in prison and 1000 lashes in 2014. She actively campaigns for his freedom. Haidar is the President of the Raif Badawi Foundation for Freedom, which actively campaigns for freedom of speech and human rights awareness in the Arab World. She ran as the Bloc Quebecois candidate in Sherbrooke for the 2021 Canadian federal election but was defeated.

== Personal life ==
Haidar married Badawi in Saudi Arabia in 2002 and became active on his case after directing harsh criticism against the religious establishment through articles and media interviews, which angered radical Saudi clerics, including Abdul-Rahman al-Barrak, Saudi religious scholar, and former member of the teaching body of Imam Muhammad ibn Saud Islamic University.

After a fatwa was issued against her husband, Haidar fled with her children to Egypt, living with an acquaintance of her husband, with assistance from his colleague, Souad al Shammari. Haidar then moved to Lebanon and lived in a predominantly Christian neighbourhood. Following her husband's arrest, Haidar filed for asylum and was accepted by Canada to avoid her father-in-law claiming custody of their children. Haidar and her children subsequently moved to Canada and settled in Sherbrooke, Quebec.

== Arrest of Raif Badawi ==
"The Saudi people rejected their liberal ideas and they were agents of the embassies. Then the voices calling for Raif's arrest and trial escalated, and the Saudi authorities arrested him on the order of the investigative body on June 12, 2012."

Haidar noted that Saudi cleric Abdul-Rahman al-Barrak issued a fatwa against Badawi, accusing him of apostasy and incited the population to kill him. Badawi was confirmed to be a Muslim after reciting the Shahada. He was arrested on 12 June 2012. Haidar left Saudi Arabia with her children as soon as the fatwa was issued for her husband, months before his arrest. Badawi stayed behind, according to Haidar because he loved and was patriotic to Saudi Arabia. Immediately after his arrest, Haidar went to Sherbrooke, Canada, where she still lives with her children. Haidar stated, "I was afraid for my life and the lives of my children, We moved to Lebanon, and then we moved to Canada immediately after his arrest, where we got a permit to establish a temporary residence".

== Campaign ==
Haidar agrees with her husband about the need to abolish the Committee for the Promotion of Virtue and the Prevention of Vice, commonly known as the Mutawwa. International bodies and human rights organizations demanded the release of Raif Badawi immediately out of respect for freedom of opinion. According to Haidar, Muhammad Badawi, Raif's father, said in a number of media interviews that "his son is an atheist, demanding that he be punished on the air", although Raif recited the Shahada in court to disprove any claims of himself being an atheist and prior to this, he had made Umrah with their three children.

In 2015, Haidar accepted, on her husband's behalf, the Sakharov Prize for human rights awarded by the European Parliament.

In 2016, Haidar asked the Canadian government under Justin Trudeau to grant Canadian citizenship to her husband, but Trudeau rejected the suggestion because dual nationality is not recognised by Saudi Arabia. Trudeau called for the release of her husband at the 2018 G20 Summit in Buenos Aires, Argentina.

Haidar holds a protest every Friday during Jumu'ah in front of Sherbrooke City Hall.

== Political involvement ==
Haidar supported the right-wing populist People's Party of Canada upon its foundation in 2018. By the time of the 2019 federal election, however, rumors circulated that she would run as a candidate for the Quebec sovereigntist Bloc Québécois, but she denied these affirmations.

In the 2021 federal elections, she sought nomination as the Bloc Québécois candidate in Sherbrooke. She was officially nominated as a candidate on August 10, 2021. She came in second place during the federal election, losing to Élisabeth Brière, the incumbent Liberal candidate.

== Awards and honours ==
- Swiss Freethinker Prize 2015, shared with Raif Badawi and Waleed Abulkhair
- 40th Anniversary of the Charter – Ambassador Quebec 2016
- Deschner Prize 2016, by the Giordano Bruno Foundation, shared with Raif Badawi
- Goldene Victoria Prize 2017, by the VDZ night publisher
- Henry Zumach Freedom From Religion Foundation Award 2018, by the FFRF
- International Laïcité Award 2018, by Comité Laïcité République shared with Raif Badawi.
- The honorary membership 2019, by Cambridge Union shared with Raif Badawi.

== Citizenship ==
Haidar and her three children with Badawi became Canadian citizens on Canada Day (July 1), 2018. On the same day Haidar called for the niqab to be banned.

== See also ==
- Women's rights in Saudi Arabia
- Saudi Canadians
