= Jean-Philippe Linteau =

Canadian diplomat

His Excellency Jean-Philippe Linteau

Canadian Ambassador to Saudi Arabia
- Incumbent
- Assumed office May 2023
- Prime Minister: Justin Trudeau; Mark Carney
- Preceded by: Dennis Horak

Personal details
- Education: McGill University; University of Toronto

Jean-Philippe Linteau is a Canadian diplomat. In May 2023, he became Canada's first Ambassador to Saudi Arabia in five years following the normalization of diplomatic relations between the two countries. He was formerly the Canadian Consul General to the United Arab Emirates.

== Education ==
- McGill University
- University of Toronto

== See also ==
- List of ambassadors of Canada to Saudi Arabia
