= Al-Kawakibi Democracy Transition Center =

The Al-Kawakibi Democracy Transition Center (KADEM) was officially founded in Amman, Jordan on 15 June 2006 following the first meeting of the center's Board of Trustees under the chairmanship of the Prince Hassan Ibn Talal. Al-Kawakibi Center was established after two years of consideration and deliberation, with the contribution of a large number of experts and democracy advocates from the Arab region and also from Europe and the US, supported by a grant from the Middle East Partnership Initiative of the United States State department. Al-Kawakibi Center is a technical non-governmental regional organization, specialized in transferring knowledge, sharing experiences and building capacities in the field of democratic transition. The center was founded on the principle of partnership between organizations and experts in the Arab region and the Middle East.

Al-Kawakibi aims at promoting the following activities and meeting the following objectives:

1. Spreading democratic culture and practices through dialogue and peaceful interaction.
2. Building local high level capacities and expertise in diagnosing, accompanying, and framing the democratic transitions, and developing alternatives.
3. Encouraging dialogue between political decision-makers and actors of the Civil Society about democratic transition issues.
4. Stimulating exchange and transfer of expertise between experts, representatives of civil society and political actors in the field of democratic transitional trends at different levels: the Middle East, the Arab region, and internationally.
5. Building an expertise clearinghouse to provide capacities for training, research, strategic planning, implementation and follow up in order to support the democratic changes in the Arab region and Middle East.

The organization presents the Zaytuna Silver Award for Excellence in Democratic Action, which recognizes Arab individuals and institutions that promote democracy.
