= List of ambassadors of Canada to Saudi Arabia =

Coordinates: 24.681959°N 46.627290°E

Ambassador of Canada to Saudi Arabia
- Incumbent; Jean-Philippe Linteau since May 2023
- Inaugural holder: Jacques Gilles Bruno Gignac
- Formation: June 24, 1973

The Canadian Ambassador to Saudi Arabia in Riyadh is the official representative of the Government of Canada in Ottawa to the Government of Saudi Arabia. He is also concurrently accredited to the government in Muscat (Oman).

== List of representatives ==
Diplomatic agreement/designated	Diplomatic accreditation	Ambassador	Observations	Prime Minister of Canada	King of Saudi Arabia	Term end
May 17, 1973	June 24, 1973	Jacques Gilles Bruno Gignac		Pierre Trudeau	Faisal of Saudi Arabia	August 28, 1974
March 1, 1974		Jean-Pierre Lefebvre	Chargé d'affaires	Pierre Trudeau	Faisal of Saudi Arabia	November 24, 1974
July 4, 1974	November 24, 1974	Michael Shenstone		Pierre Trudeau	Faisal of Saudi Arabia	August 24, 1976
September 21, 1976	January 26, 1977	Edward Lucien Bobinski		Pierre Trudeau	Khalid of Saudi Arabia	July 9, 1979
April 4, 1979	September 19, 1979	William John Jenkins		Joe Clark	Khalid of Saudi Arabia	December 4, 1980
February 5, 1981	February 23, 1981	Jacques Silva Roy		Pierre Trudeau	Khalid of Saudi Arabia	
September 22, 1982	October 25, 1982	Dwight Wilder Fulford		Pierre Trudeau	Fahd of Saudi Arabia	August 15, 1985
September 12, 1985	November 19, 1985	George Douglas Valentine		Brian Mulroney	Fahd of Saudi Arabia	
September 28, 1989		Allan Norman Lever		Brian Mulroney	Fahd of Saudi Arabia	July 15, 1993
June 23, 1993	September 1, 1993	Peter Sutherland		Kim Campbell	Fahd of Saudi Arabia	
September 11, 1996		Daniel Edward Hobson		Jean Chrétien	Fahd of Saudi Arabia	July 16, 2000
2000		Melvyn MacDonald		Jean Chrétien	Fahd of Saudi Arabia	July 24, 2003
July 31, 2003	September 13, 2003	Roderick Bell		Paul Martin	Fahd of Saudi Arabia	
August 31, 2007		Ronald Davidson		Stephen Harper	Abdullah of Saudi Arabia	
May 14, 2009		David Chatterson		Stephen Harper	Abdullah of Saudi Arabia	
March 30, 2012		Thomas MacDonald		Stephen Harper	Abdullah of Saudi Arabia	
July 31, 2015	December 15, 2015	Dennis Horak	Expelled from the country in August 2018.	Justin Trudeau	Abdullah of Saudi Arabia	
August 2018	January 2020	Muhammad Ali	Chargé d'affaires	Justin Trudeau		
May 2023		Jean-Philippe Linteau		Justin Trudeau		
