= Kohail murder case =

Mohamed and Sultan Kohail
- Born: Mohamed Kohail - 1985 (age 40–41); Sultan Kohail 1991 (age 34–35); Saudi Arabia
- Occupation: Students
- Status: Released
- Conviction: Found guilty by Saudi low level general court
- Criminal charges: Mohamed Kohail - Murder; Sultan Kohail Accessory to Murder
- Penalty: Mohamed Kohail - Death by Beheading; Sultan Kohail - originally sentenced to one year in prison and will receive 200 lashes later overturned on appeal.

Mohamed Kohail (born 1985) and Sultan Kohail (born 1991) are naturalized Canadian citizens born in Saudi Arabia. They lived there for 16 years before gaining citizenship and moving to Montreal, Quebec, Canada in 2000. Mohamed had been found guilty in a Saudi court for the murder of a 19-year-old Syrian boy, Munzer Hiraki, who died in a schoolyard brawl in January 2007. Mohamed was sentenced to death and Sultan to 200 lashes. Their sentences were later commuted.

== Incident, trial and aftermath ==
In January 2007, Mohamed and his brother Sultan were involved in a fight that broke out after a girl's male cousin accused Sultan of insulting her. The girl's cousin demanded an apology, but Sultan refused. Sultan, then 16, said he called for help from Mohamed when he was confronted by several boys over the insult. According to the brothers' account, Mohamed Kohail arrived at the school with a male friend to face about a dozen of the girl's male relatives and friends, some armed with clubs and knives. A brawl started, and according to the victim's cousins, Sultan, Mohamed and another boy beat Munzer to death. No footage exists of that action, but clear footage showed the victim, Munzer, kicking Mohamed in the head.

Their original trial before the General Court took place over nine sessions, lasting approximately 10 minutes per session. Their lawyer was allowed to attend only the last one or two, and was not allowed to challenge the evidence brought against his clients. During the hearing on March 3, the Kohail defense brought two witnesses but the court did not take them into consideration.

The Kohail defense team denied that Munzer died because of the fight but rather due to heart problems, as evidenced by the autopsy. Munzer's mother presented a health certificate dated six months previously which indicated that he was in perfect condition. When asked why she had obtained a health certificate, Munzer's mother replied that her son needed a health certificate so that he could run in a marathon.

On March 3, 2008 the court sentenced Mohamed Kohail to be executed by public beheading. In February 2009, the Saudi Supreme Court rejected the death sentence and asked the lower court to revise its ruling. However, on April 2, 2009, the lower court rejected the recommendation of the higher court and reconfirmed the death penalty.

In May 2013, the Ottawa Citizen reported that Mohamed Kohail had been released from prison in December 2012. The family never released a statement and the release went uncovered in Saudi Arabia itself.
