= Sandy Mitchell (prisoner) =

British man imprisoned on terrorism charges

Alexander Mitchell was one of seven men incarcerated in Saudi Arabia between December 2000 and August 2003 for the bombing death of Christopher Rodway, a British National living in Riyadh. While in prison, he was tortured and forced to make a televised confession in which he detailed the methods and as to which he and his fellow prisoners committed the crime. He was later granted clemency and returned to the UK, as a result of intense negotiations by Charles, Prince of Wales and a prisoner exchange involving Saudi prisoners held by the United States at Guantanamo Bay, Cuba.

Mitchell says the bombings were perpetrated by "Islamic extremists" and that he and others charged were victims of a cover-up conspiracy by Saudi authorities. Along with Mark Hollingsworth, he wrote Saudi Babylon: Torture, Corruption and Cover-Up Inside the House of Saud.

Others charged in connection with the death of Christopher Rodway include Les Walker, Ron Jones, Mike Sedlak, Raf Schyvens, and Bill Sampson.

Mitchell, Walker, Jones, and Sampson, with the backing of Amnesty International, The Redress Trust, and Interights, sought the right in the British court system to sue Saudi Arabia for their torture. They won a Court of Appeal ruling in 2004, but it was overturned by a 2006 Law Lords ruling based on the State Immunity Act 1978.

The killer or killers of Christopher Rodway were never identified. Al Qaeda in the Arabian Peninsula, the local Al Qaeda affiliate, never claimed responsibility for the murder.

== See also ==
- William Sampson (author)
