= Architecture of Montreal =

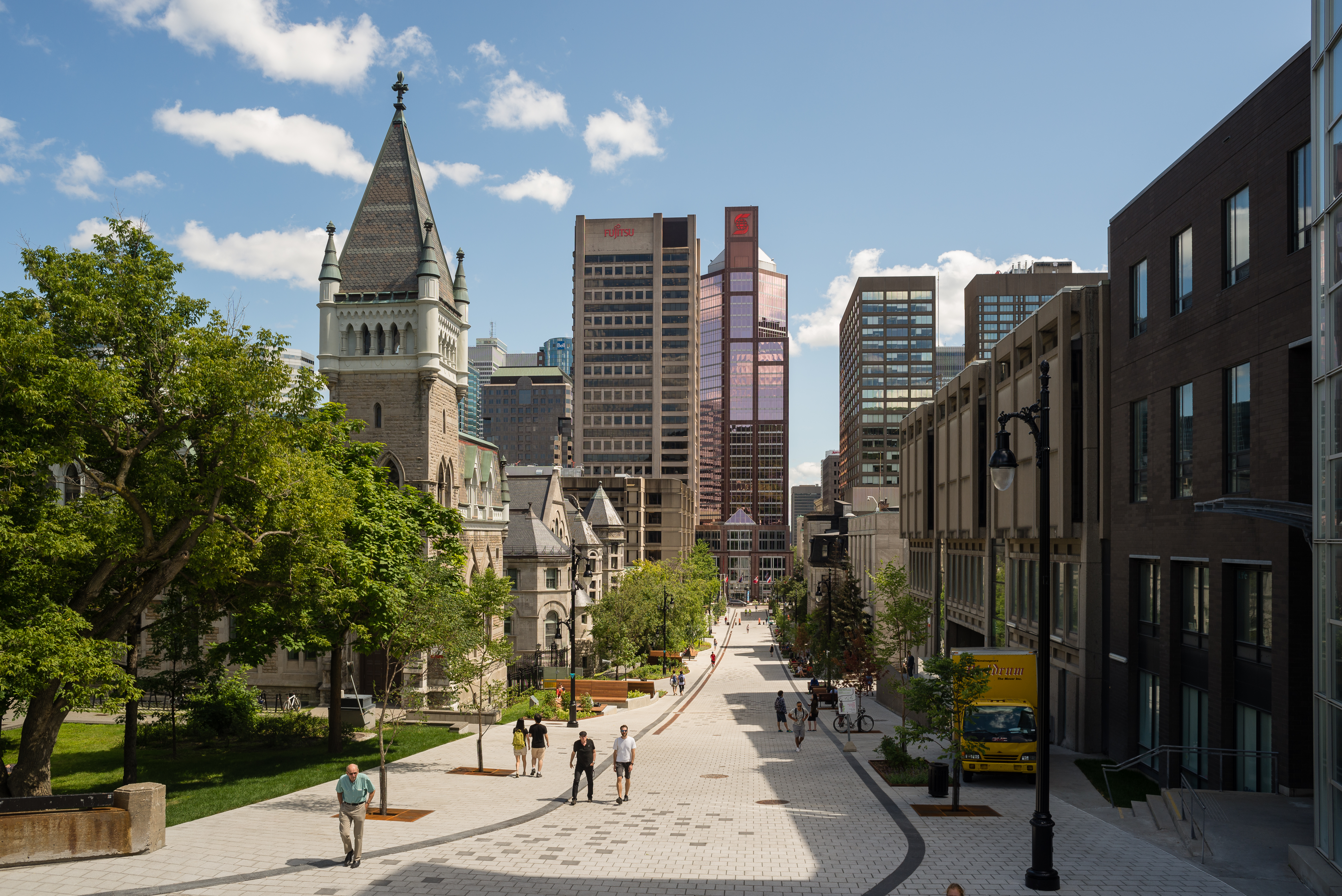
View of Montreal from McTavish Street. The architecture of Montreal is characterized by a wide variety of architectural styles.

The architecture of Montreal, Quebec, Canada is characterized by the juxtaposition of the old and the new and a wide variety of architectural styles, the legacy of two successive colonizations by the French, the British, and the close presence of modern architecture to the south. Much like Quebec City, the city of Montreal had fortifications, but they were destroyed between 1804 and 1817.

For over a century and a half, Montreal was the industrial and financial centre of Canada. The variety of buildings included factories, elevators, warehouses, mills, and refineries, which today provide a legacy of historic and architectural interest, especially in the Downtown area and in Old Montreal. Many historical buildings in Old Montreal retain their original form, notably the impressive 19th century headquarters of all major Canadian banks on Saint Jacques Street (formerly known as Saint James Street).

From the Art Deco period, Montreal offers a handful of notable examples: Ernest Cormier's Université de Montréal main building located on the northern side of Mount Royal and the Aldred Building at Place d'Armes, an historic square in Old Montreal.

In fact, Place d'Armes, shown in panorama below, is surrounded by buildings representing several major periods in Montreal architecture: the Gothic Revival Notre-Dame Basilica; New York Life Building, Montreal's first high-rise; the Pantheon-like Bank of Montreal head office, Canada's first bank; the aforementioned Aldred Building. (1931) and the International style 500 Place D'Armes.

== Church architecture ==
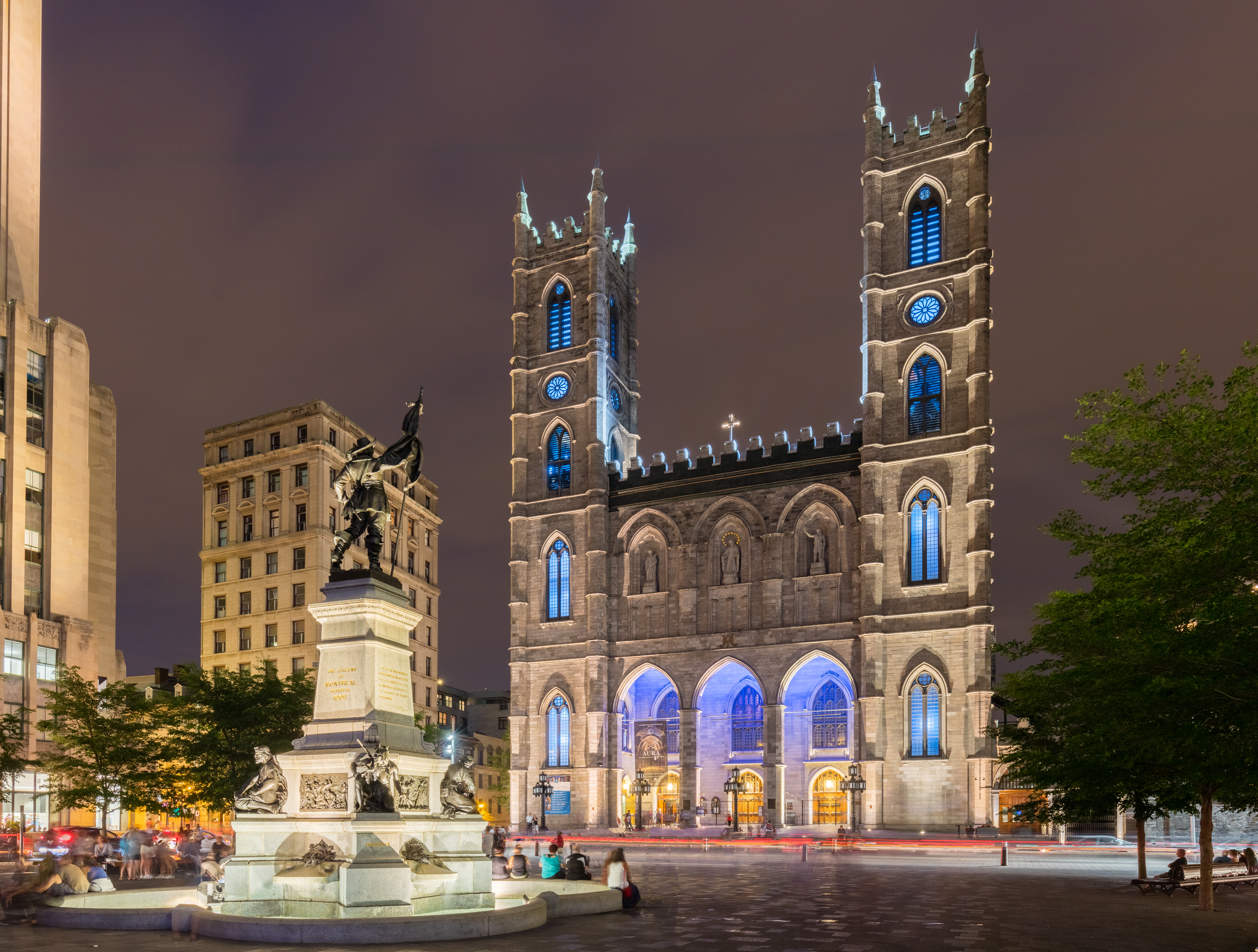
Dedicated in 1829, Notre-Dame Basilica is one of four Roman Catholic basilicas located in the city.

Founded as a Roman Catholic French colony and nicknamed "la ville aux cent clochers" (the city of a hundred belltowers), Montreal is renowned for its churches. The city has four Roman Catholic basilicas: Mary, Queen of the World Cathedral, Notre-Dame Basilica, St. Patrick's Basilica, and Saint Joseph's Oratory. The Oratory is the largest church in Canada, with the largest dome of its kind in the world after that of Saint Peter's Basilica in Rome. Other well-known churches include Notre-Dame-de-Bon-Secours Chapel, which is sometimes called the Sailors' Church.

Following the British victory in the Seven Years' War, many protestant immigrants came to the city from England, Scotland and Ireland. This led to various Protestant churches being built to accommodate the growing community. The two most notable of these are the Saint James United Church and the Anglican Christ Church Cathedral, which was suspended above an excavated pit during the construction of the Promenades Cathédrale mall, part of Montreal's Underground City.

== Skyscrapers ==
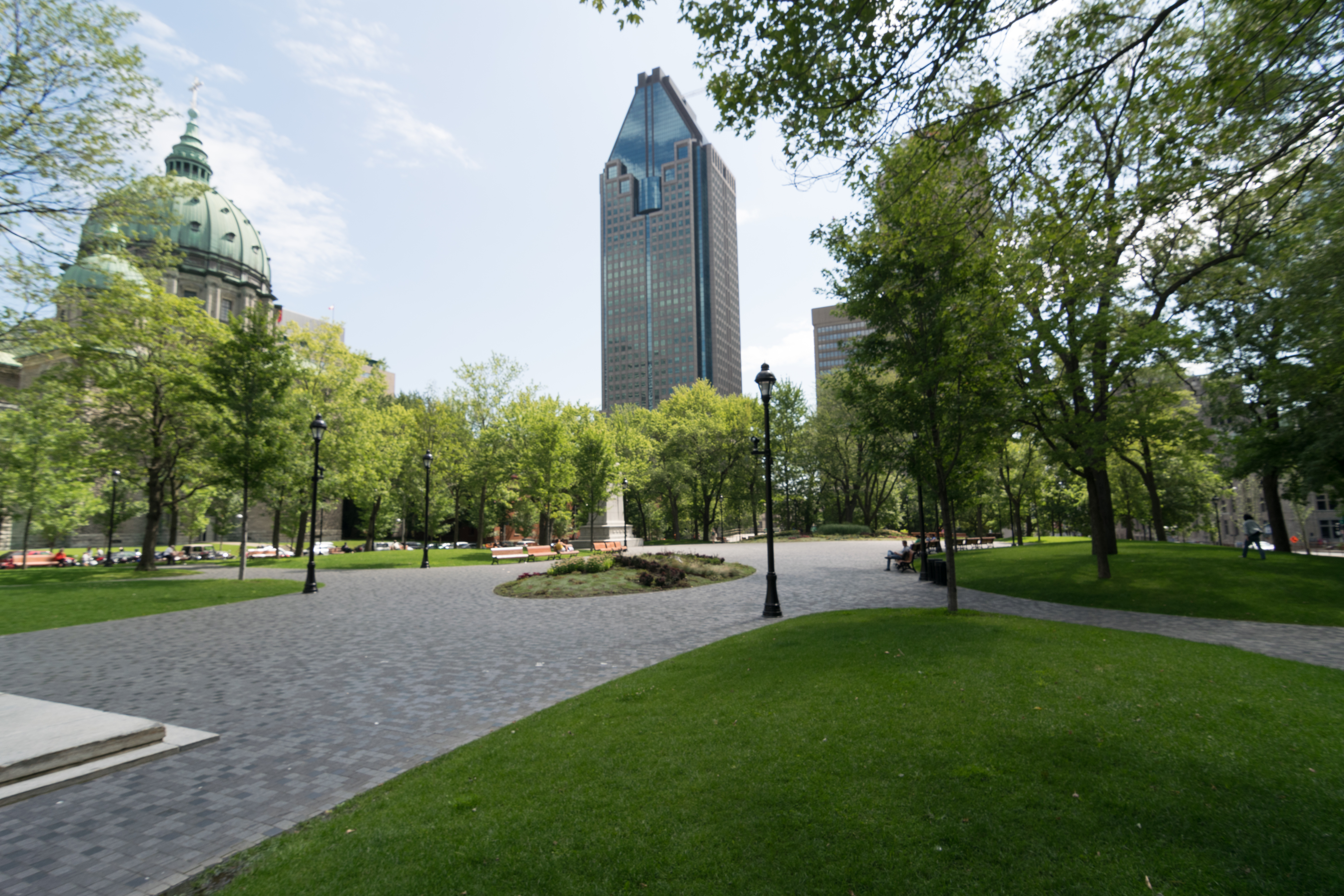
At 205 metres (673 ft), 1000 de La Gauchetière is postmodern skyscraper, and the tallest building in the city.

Skyscraper construction in Montreal has swung between periods of intense activity and prolonged lulls. A two-year period from 1962 to 1964 saw the completion of four of Montreal's ten tallest buildings: Tour de la Bourse, I. M. Pei's landmark cruciform Place Ville-Marie, the CIBC Building and CIL House. Its tallest buildings, the 51-storey 1000 de La Gauchetière and the 47-storey 1250 René-Lévesque, were both completed in 1992.

Montreal places height-limits on skyscrapers so that they do not exceed 200m in height nor the summit of Mount Royal. Only the St. Joseph's Oratory reaches an elevation higher than 232.5 metres above mean sea level (Mount Royal elevation). Above-ground height is further limited in most areas and only a few downtown land plots are allowed to exceed 120 metres in height. The limit is currently attained by 1000 de La Gauchetière and 1250 René-Lévesque, the latter of which is shorter, but built on higher ground.

The Tour de Montréal, incorporated into the north base of Montreal's Olympic Stadium is the tallest inclined tower in the world, at 175 m (574 ft).

== Expo 67 ==
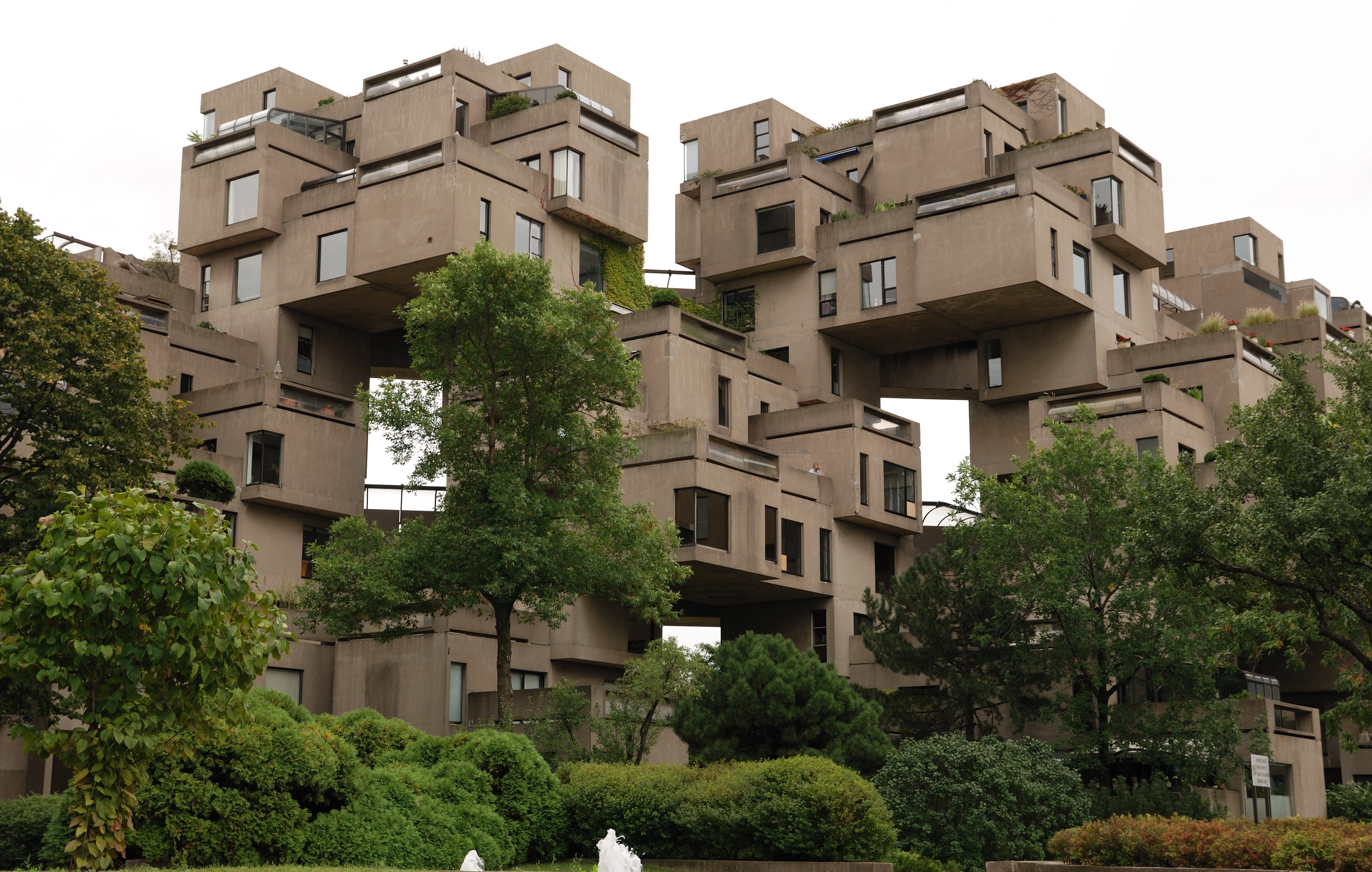
Habitat 67 is a model community and housing complex that was showcased at Expo 67.

Pavilions designed for the 1967 International and Universal Exposition, popularly known as Expo 67, featured a wide range of architectural designs. Though most pavilions were temporary structures, several remaining structures have become Montreal landmarks, including the geodesic dome US Pavilion, now the Montreal Biosphère, as well as Moshe Safdie's striking Habitat 67 apartment complex. The French pavilion and Québec Pavilion of Expo 67 underwent significant renovations in 1992 to become the Montreal Casino.

== Montreal Metro ==
In terms of modern architecture, the Montreal Metro is filled with public art by artists in Quebec culture. In addition, the design and ornamentation of each station in the Metro system is unique, much like the Stockholm Metro and the Moscow Metro.

== Other notable structures ==
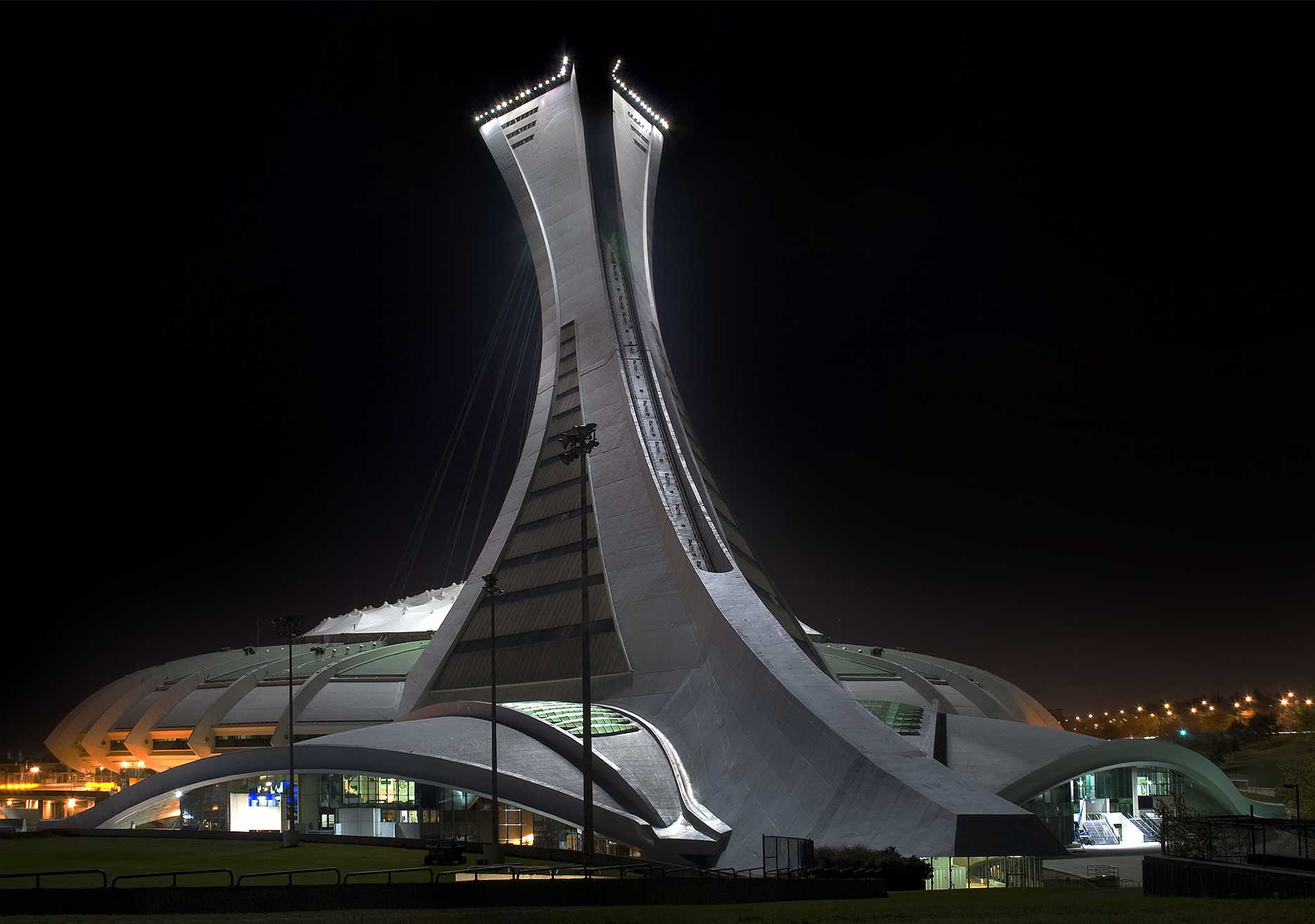
The Olympic Stadium was the main venue for the 1976 Summer Olympics. It features the world's tallest inclined tower.

Other significant works of modern architecture in Montreal include the Brutalist Place Bonaventure, the world's second largest commercial building when it was completed in 1967, Ludwig Mies van der Rohe's Westmount Square and Roger Taillibert's controversial Olympic Stadium, which incorporates the world's tallest inclined tower, at 175 metres.

Montreal architects Pierre Boulva and Jacques David completed a number of modernist landmarks in the 1960s, including the Palais de justice de Montréal, 500 Place D'Armes, Théâtre Maisonneuve, the Dow Planetarium and the Place-des-Arts, Atwater and Lucien-L'Allier metro stations.

In 2006, the city was recognized by the international design community as a UNESCO City of Design, one of the three world design capitals.

=== Outdoor staircases ===
Tens of thousands of iconic spiral staircases are found on the outside of buildings in Montreal, which can be especially dangerous for apartment dwellers, e.g., during freezing rainstorms.

== Heritage conservation ==
The Conseil du patrimoine de Montréal advises the municipal government on matters related to heritage building preservation. A pair of non-governmental groups have worked to preserve Montreal historic buildings since the 1970s: Save Montreal, co-founded by Michael Fish in 1974, and Heritage Montreal, founded by Phyllis Lambert two years later. In 1979, Lambert founded the Canadian Centre for Architecture (CCA), an architecture museum and research centre located in downtown Montreal. In October 2009, Lambert, Heritage Montreal and others formed a think tank called the Institut de politiques alternatives de Montréal to advise the city on a range of matters including urban planning, development and heritage.

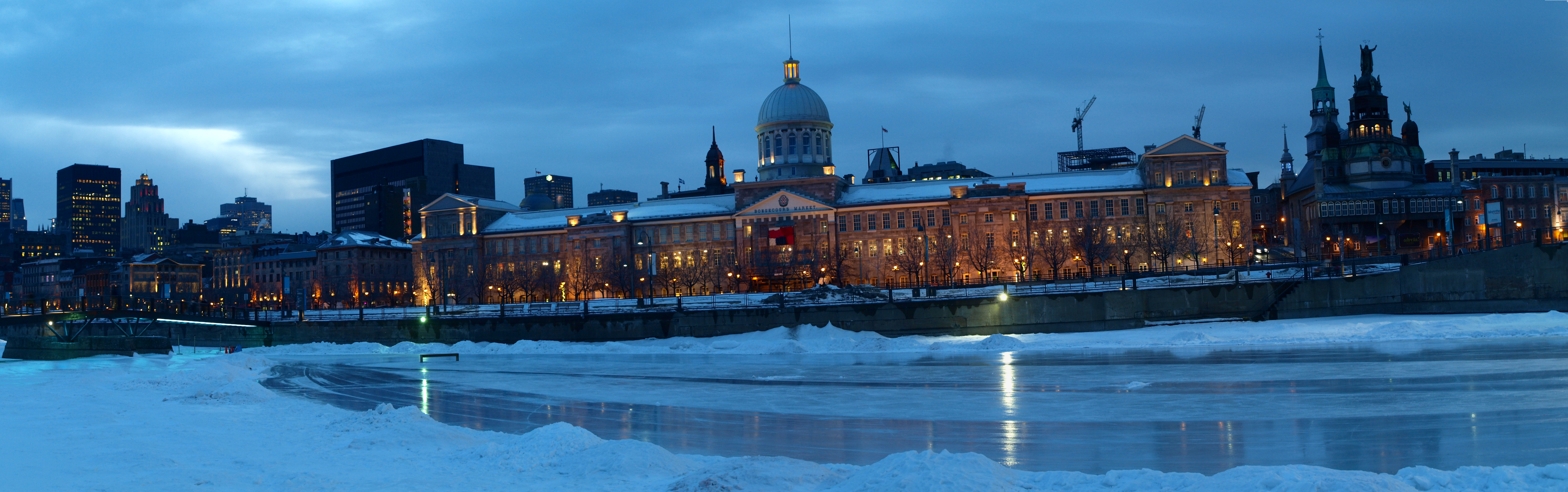
View of Old Montreal from the Old Port of Montreal.

== See also ==
- Architecture of Canada
- Architecture of Quebec
- Arcop
- Culture of Montreal
- Golden Square Mile
- List of National Historic Sites of Canada in Montreal
- List of old Montreal buildings
- List of Quebec architects
- Percy Erskine Nobbs
- Underground City, Montreal
