= List of Quebec architects =

This is a list of architects from Quebec, Canada.

- Ray Affleck
- John Smith Archibald
- Charles Baillairgé
- François Baillairgé
- Jean Baillairgé
- Thomas Baillairgé
- Claude Baillif
- Béïque Legault Thuot, architecture firm
- François-Xavier Berlinguet
- Henry Musgrave Blaiklock
- George Browne
- Napoléon Bourassa
- Louis Bourgeois
- Aurèle Cardinal
- Melvin Charney
- Claude Cormier
- Ernest Cormier
- Marie-Chantal Croft
- Roger D'Astous
- Jean Dumontier
- Alexander Francis Dunlop
- Harold Lea Fetherstonhaugh
- Robert Findlay
- Karl Fischer
- Michael Fish
- Dan Hanganu
- Julien Hébert
- Maxwell M. Kalman
- Phyllis Lambert
- Richard Landry
- Ludger Lemieux
- Robert Henry MacDonald
- Janet Leys Shaw Mactavish
- Edward Maxwell
- William Sutherland Maxwell
- Harry Mayerovitch
- John Campbell Merrett
- Georges-Alphonse Monette
- Percy Erskine Nobbs
- James O'Donnell
- John Ostell
- Christian Ouellet
- Maurice Perrault
- Peter Rose
- George Allen Ross
- Ross and Macdonald, architecture firm
- Hazen Sise
- Eugène-Étienne Taché
- Andrew Taylor
- William Thomas
- William Tutin Thomas, son of William Thomas
- Joseph Venne
- John Wells

== See also ==
- Architecture of Quebec
- Architecture of Montreal
- Architecture of Quebec City
