= Architecture of Quebec City =

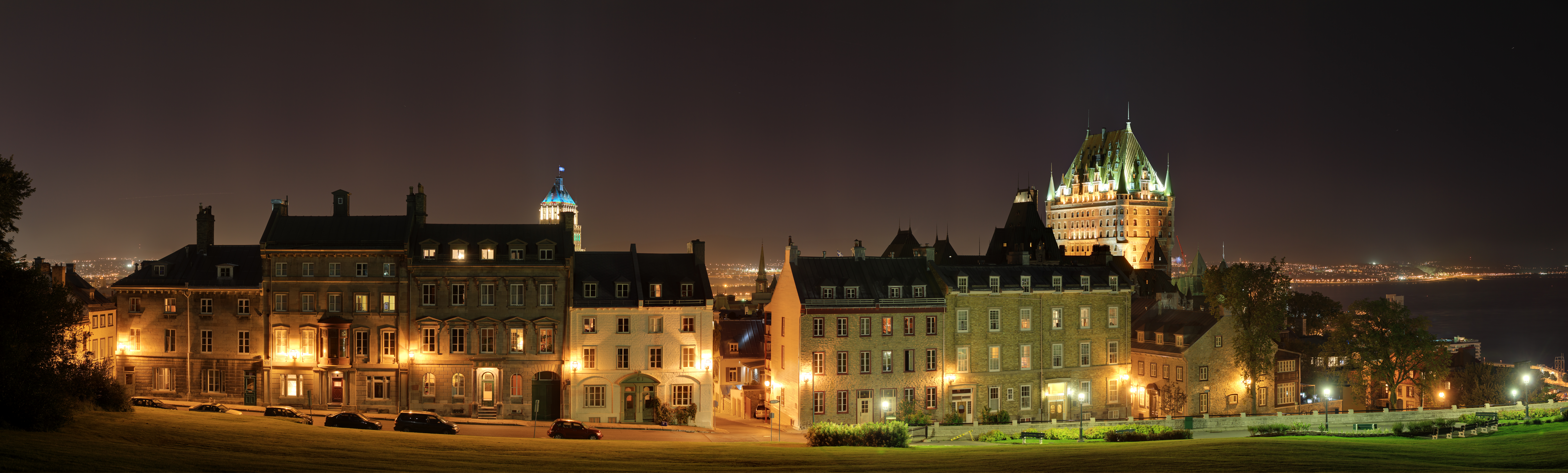
Colonial buildings in Old Quebec

The architecture of Quebec City is characterized by its being one of the oldest cities of Northern America, founded in 1608. The French settlers of the area built in an architectural style similar to that of their native France. Quebec City is the only remaining fortified city north of Mexico and was declared a World Heritage Site by UNESCO in 1985.

Quebec City has significant secular architecture, including hundreds of surviving heritage homes which have been built in the particular style of New France. This style is based on 17th- and 18th-century house forms of Normandy and elsewhere in the north of France, adapted to the colder winter climate of Quebec.

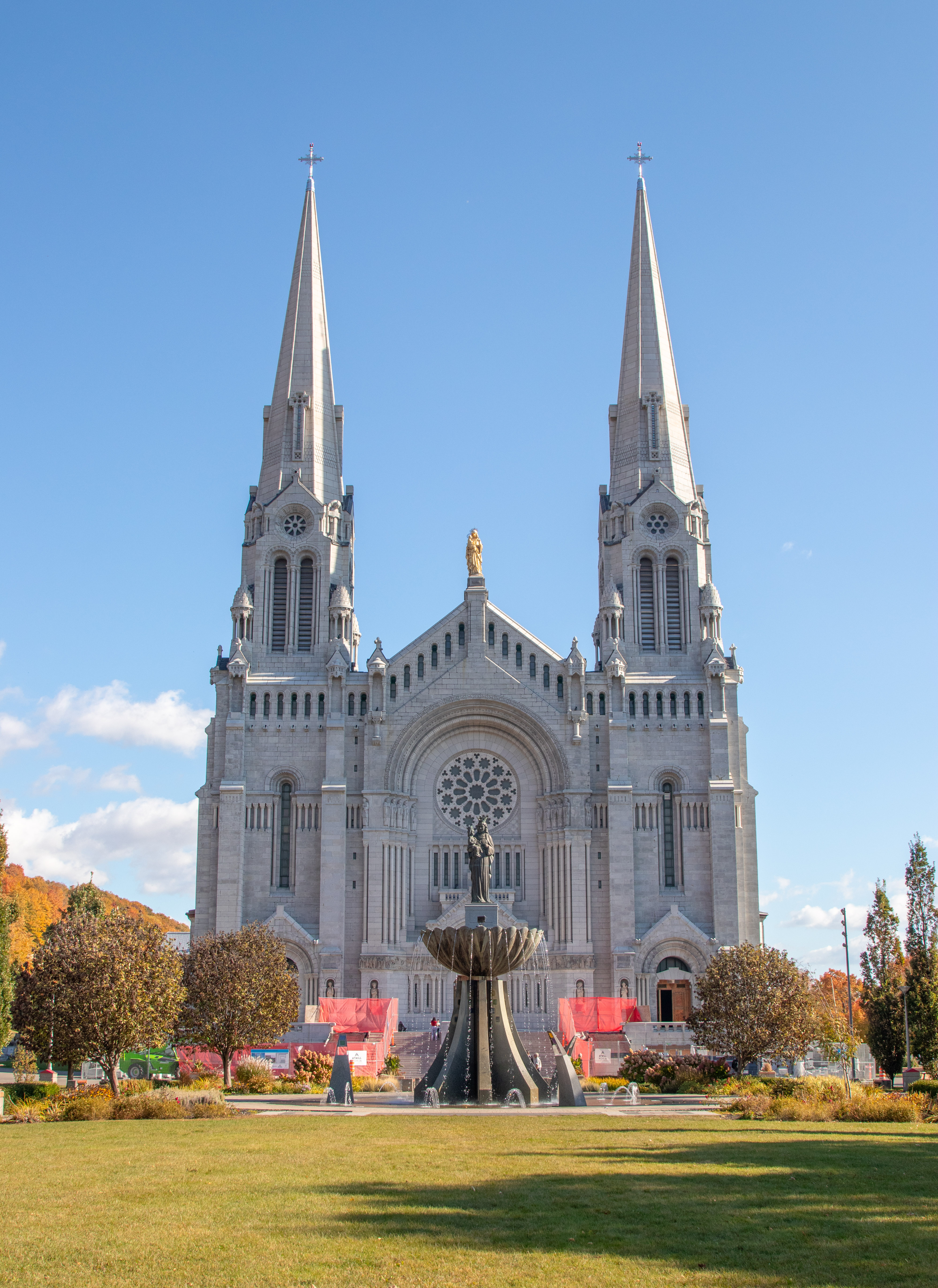
Basilica of Sainte-Anne-de-Beaupré

Quebec has always been a predominantly Roman Catholic city and contains a number of notable Catholic churches, including the Notre-Dame de Québec Cathedral and Notre-Dame-des-Victoires Church; in addition, the massive Basilica of Sainte-Anne-de-Beaupré is located 30 km (19 mi) outside the city.

== See also ==
- Culture of Quebec
- List of Quebec architects
- Architecture of Quebec
- Architecture of Montreal
- Architecture of Canada
- Society of Architectural Historians
- Canadian Centre for Architecture
