= The Word Bookstore =

Used bookstore

Coordinates: 45.5079597°N 73.5751551°W

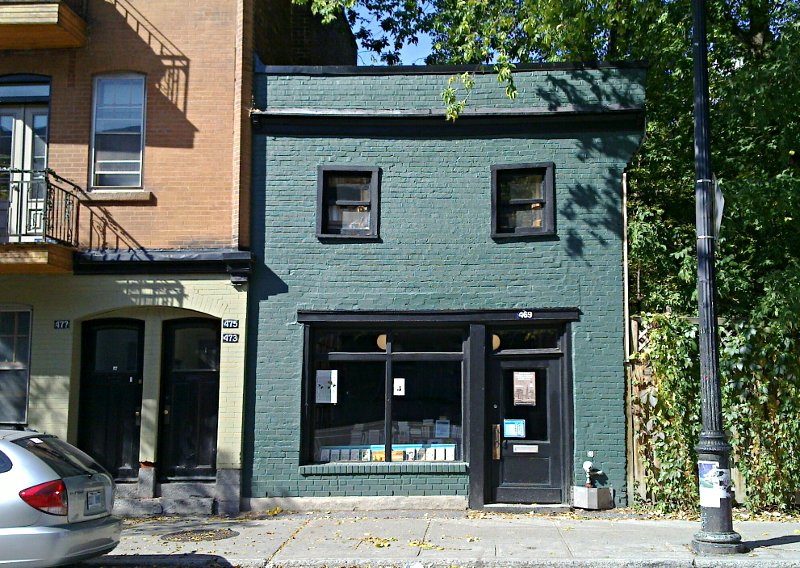
- The Word Bookstore entrance, 2011
- Type: Private
- Industry: Books
- Founded: Montreal, Quebec (1973)
- Headquarters: 469, rue Milton; Montreal, Quebec; H2X 1W3
- Key people: Adrian King-Edwards and Luci Friesen (co-founders)
- Website: Official website

The Word Bookstore, or simply The Word, is an independent bookstore located in the McGill Ghetto in Montreal, Canada. Adrian King-Edwards and Lucille Friesen, who met as students at McGill, founded the store in 1973 as an “underground” bookstore in their apartment living room. Then, in 1975 they moved it next door into a 19th-century brick building that had long housed a Chinese laundromat. The store is known for its literature, philosophy and poetry, and for its old-fashioned character; there is no sign outside, the shelves are unlabelled, and books are stacked throughout the shop. As of 2026, Adrian King-Edwards still runs The Word with his son, Brendan King-Edwards.

The store’s proximity to McGill has shaped its business, as most of its customers are students, and it supplies course books for McGill and Concordia University classes. Besides its low-priced used books, The Word deals in rare and collectible books, sells at antiquarian book fairs in Montreal and Toronto, rents books to film and television productions shot in Montreal, and appraises writers’ archives for university libraries.

The Word has been part of Montreal’s English-language literary community since its founding. It began with weekly poetry readings in the founders’ living room, and the store still hosts readings. Notable writers who have visited including Al Purdy, Mavis Gallant, Anne Carson and Yann Martel. The store has ranked first in the Montreal Mirror’s annual Best of Montreal list, and in 2009 the Quebec Writers’ Federation honoured King-Edwards and Friesen for their contribution to local literary culture. The Word celebrated its 50th anniversary in 2025 and has since begun raising money to restore the building’s historic facade.

== History ==
==== Founding ====
The Word Bookstore was established by Adrian King-Edwards and Lucille Friesen. It began when the two went on a road trip, along with Friesen's son, in their old Volkswagen van through northern British Columbia. The couple believed people in northern B.C. might not have access to as many reading materials, so they loaded their books into the back of their van to sell. After returning to Montreal, the couple continued selling books in their own apartment living room as an "underground" bookstore, with a photo of George Bernard Shaw in the front window, so people knew where to find them. In 1975, 469 rue Milton became available, and King-Edwards and Friesen rented the 19th-century brick building until they could buy it in the 1990s. Since renting the building, it has served as a bookstore and remains the same bookstore that it is today, also known as The Word. King-Edwards and Friesen have since parted, and Friesen is no longer involved with the store; however, King-Edwards has credited Friesen's role in The Word's development.

==== A History of the Property and Its previous Owners ====
Before it became The Word Bookstore in 1975, 469 Rue Milton housed Tom Sing Laundry, run by brothers Tom Tong and Sang Tom, who were Chinese migrants living in Montreal. Tom Sing Laundry appears in directories since 1896. Before the Chinese laundry business, the building was a horse stable owned by a wealthy man who lived nearby, with city records dating back to 1835. The Word still holds remnants of its past: boxes from its laundry business days that now holds books, and an iron ring in the wall that was used to tie a horse. The Word has operated at this location since 1975, in Milton Park, Montreal, also known as the McGill Ghetto.

==== The Building and Its Proposed Restorations Plans ====
The Word has no exterior sign, and the interior has no signs indicating where one section ends and the other begins, though the books are shelved in an organized way. In the store, books are stacked high on shelves, and boxes and tables in the middle of the store display featured books and new arrivals. In the centre of the shop, there’s an antique armchair, and next to it is a warm gas stove, where customers can sit and read. In the back left corner, a staircase goes up to the storage room, which holds books. In 2025, the owners marked The Word’s 50th anniversary and planned to restore the historic facade and maintain the building. The bookstore started the “One Word” campaign to fund contractors and construction services. As of August 23rd, 2026, the campaign has raised $70,000 toward a goal of $125,000.

==== Challenges ====
During the COVID-19 pandemic, many businesses closed temporarily, including The Word. Research on e-commerce during the pandemic showed that customers reported concern about contracting the virus, and shopping habits shifted toward e-commerce, in which goods are purchased and sold online. The bookstore asked community members on social media for support during COVID-19. Since COVID-19, the bookstore has overcome this challenge and has continued its traditional method of selling books in-store, directly to customers. As of November 18th, 2026, course books for McGill and Concordia students must be picked up in store when purchased on the website.

==== Events and Awards ====
The Word has hosted various events over the years and has collected a few awards for its contributions to literary culture. In 1973, the owners hosted weekly poetry readings in their apartment living room, attended by local English poets. As of November 14th, 2026, The Word hosts 1-2 poetry readings each year. Each December, the bookshop hosts a mulled wine party for neighbours and friends. The Word has also hosted a creative writing seminar for a writing communications class at McGill. Beyond events hosted in the bookstore itself, The Word has appeared as a seller at the Toronto Antiquarian Book Fair and the Montreal Antiquarian Book Fair, where Canadian and international sellers of antiquarian books, prints, maps, manuscripts, and photographs will showcase what they are selling. The Word was named the number one secondhand bookstore in the Montreal Mirror’s annual “Best of Montreal” list. In 2009, the Quebec Writers’ Federation presented King-Edwards and Friesen the QWF award in honour of their contribution to local literary culture.

Famous People

Various notable individuals have been spotted at The Word over the years, mostly authors and poets.Yann Martel, author of the well-known philosophical novel Life of Pi, has been spotted at the shop. Canadian academic, author, and poet, Anne Carson, winner of the 2026 Nobel Prize in Literature, used to come in the 1990s, when she was a professor at McGill University. Mavis Gallante, a well-known Canadian writer who specializes in short stories, has also been seen at The Word. Al Purdy, Canada’s “unofficial poet laureate,” stopped by their apartment in the early days to see what was available. John Newlove, a dominant voice of prairie poetry, was once a regular at the shop and well-known for receiving the Governor General’s Literacy Award.

== Location ==
The Word occupies a two-storey brick building at 469 rue Milton in the Milton-Parc neighbourhood, two blocks east of McGill University campus. The building is more than 150 years old, and co-owner Brendan King-Edwards has described it as “one of the oldest buildings on Milton Street.” Before the bookstore moved in, it housed a neighbourhood Chinese laundry for about 70 years. The founders had previously sold books from their apartment next door, and they took over the space when the laundry closed in 1975. The store’s location close to McGill has undoubtedly shaped its business: Its customers are mostly students, and it has supplied course books for McGill and Concordia University classes, with about 30 McGill professors ordering textbooks through the store. Founder Adrian King-Edwards calls the location “just ideal” because hundreds of people walk past the store every day.

When the store opened, the neighbourhood of Milton-Parc was a low-rent area of rooming houses for elderly residents and low-income students. Most of Milton-Parc’s housing was built between 1860 and 1900, originally for families of the bourgeoisie. By 1969, the developer Concordia Estates had purchased approximately 97% of the neighbourhood. In 1971, the company launched La Cité, a three-phase urban renewal project which proposed the demolition of Milton Parc for the construction of an extensive hotel-residential and commercial complex. Residents had formed the Milton-Parc Citizens’ Committee in 1968 to organize opposition to the demolition. In all, 255 properties were demolished, but the La Cité complex would be the first and only phase built. After Phase 1 was completed in 1977, Concordia Estates subsequently sold the remaining two-thirds of Milton Parc to a new company, Paxmil. In 1979, the citizens’ committee and Héritage Montréal secured the remaining properties. The resulting project, carried out from 1979 to 1982, renovated over 135 historic buildings and 597 dwelling units and became North America’s largest non-profit, cooperative housing project established on a community land trust.

Owner Adrian King-Edwards has said that independent bookstores can “respond immediately to the market in front of them”, and that for The Word, that market is the McGill community. Research on community bookselling has made a similar argument about these types of bookshops in general; researcher Hannah Smith concluded that by focusing on the needs of their local community, these bookshops are able to elevate the value of their business and products at a time when traditional retail outlets are struggling to retain customers. When the store opened, Milton-Parc was a low-rent area of rooming houses for elderly residents and low-income students, and over the following decades, as many properties were converted into condominiums and the neighbourhood became more affluent, the store was still able to retain its customer base. The owners bought the building in the early 2010s. They have said that without owning it, rising rents would have forced the store out, and that rents would make it very difficult to open a similar second-hand bookstore in the area today.

== People ==
The following people have owned or held key roles at The Word. The list is sorted by when each person became involved with the store, where known.

- Adrian King-Edwards, co founder and wonder (1973–present)
- Lucille (Luci) Friesen, co founder (1973–?)
- Donna Jean-Louis, film and television book rentals
- Brendan King-Edwards, owner and manager
- Scott Moodie, staff

== Specializations and Services ==
In addition to selling new and secondhand books, The Word offers several specialized services, including dealing in rare books, buying books, supplying course books, renting books to film and television productions, and appraising literary archives.

==== Rare Books and Antiquarian Book Fairs ====
Besides its low-prices secondhand stock, The Word deals in rare and collectible books. Adrian King-Edwards is one of the organizers of the annual Montreal Antiquarian Book Fair. The store’s most valuable editions are kept in storage instead of on the shop floor, and are sold at the fair. King-Edwards recently sold a first edition of Leonard Cohen’s Let Us Compare Mythologies, the first book in the McGill Poetry Series, to a collector for $10,000.

==== Buying Books ====
Buying books is a core part of the store’s business. Brendan King-Edwards has said the store’s everyday work has stayed the same since it opened: buying and selling books, and matching the right book to the right reader.

==== Course Books ====
The Word has supplied course books to McGill and Concordia students for many years. Students order their required titles online and pick them up at the store on Milton Street.

==== Books for Film and Television ====
The store keeps thousands of books in a double garage and rents them to film and television productions shot in Montreal, including Life of Pi, Pet Sematary, and Barney’s Version. Donna Jean-Louis handles most of the rental work.

==== Appraisals ====
Adrian and Brendan King-Edwards are frequently hired to appraise writers’ archives for the McGill and Concordia university libraries.

==== Blind Date With a Book ====
The store also offers a “blind date with a book,” in which customers choose a genre without knowing which book they will receive.
