= Architecture of Quebec =

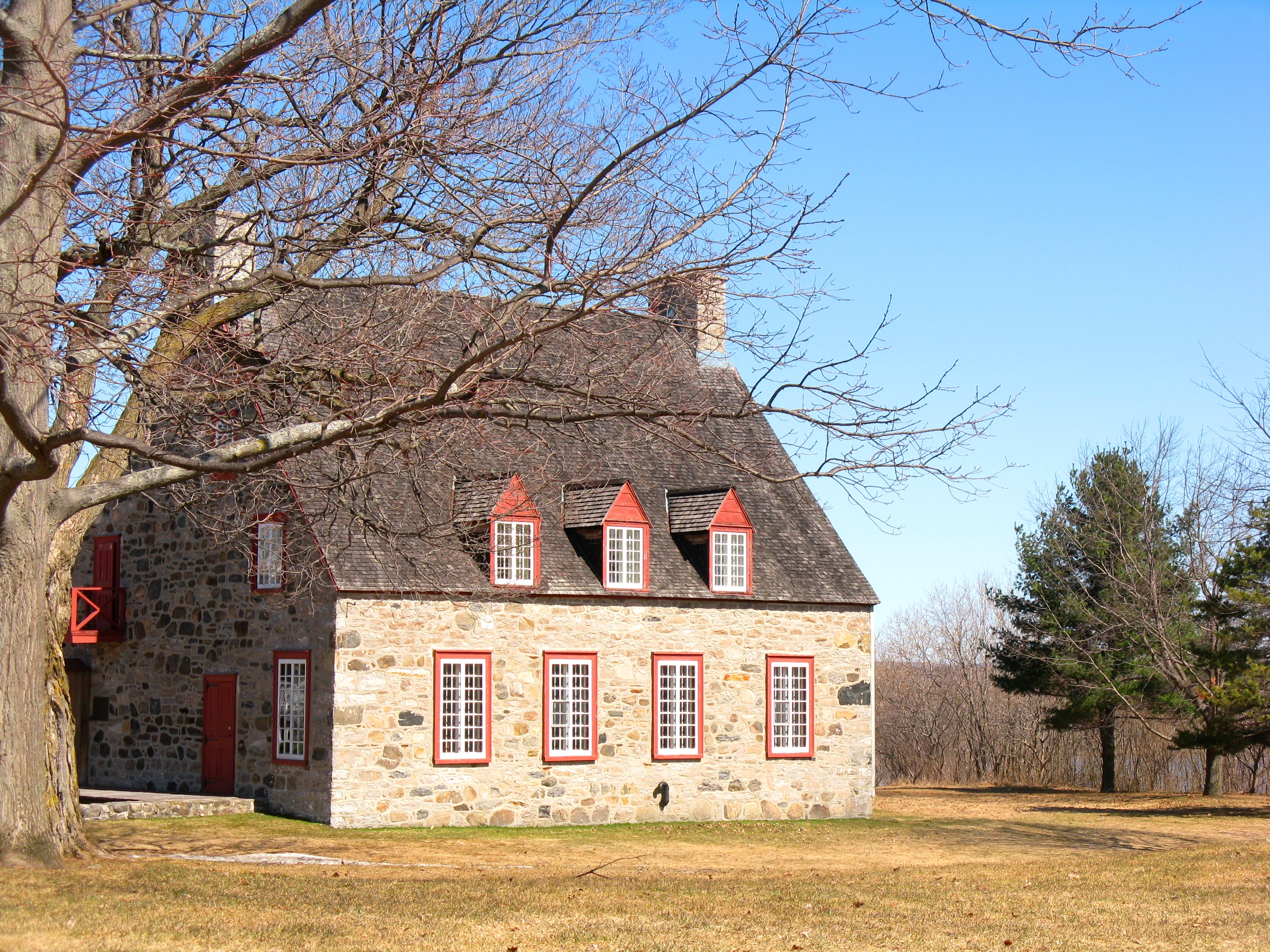
Deschambault Presbytery

The architecture of Quebec was at first characterized by the settlers of the rural areas along the St. Lawrence River who largely came from Normandy. The houses they built echoed their roots. The surroundings forced enough differences that a unique style developed, and the house of the New France farmer remains a symbol of French-Canadian nationalism. These were rectangular structures of one storey, but with an extremely tall and steep roof, sometimes almost twice as tall as the house below. The roof design perhaps developed to prevent the accumulation of snow. The houses were usually built of wood, but the surviving ones are almost all built of stone.

Landmarks in the rural areas were the churches and the mansion of the seigneurs. The seigneurs built much larger homes for themselves but rarely made the manors ornate. Each parish had its church, often smelter copies of major churches in Quebec City or Montreal. A unique style of French-Canadian homo church thus developed.

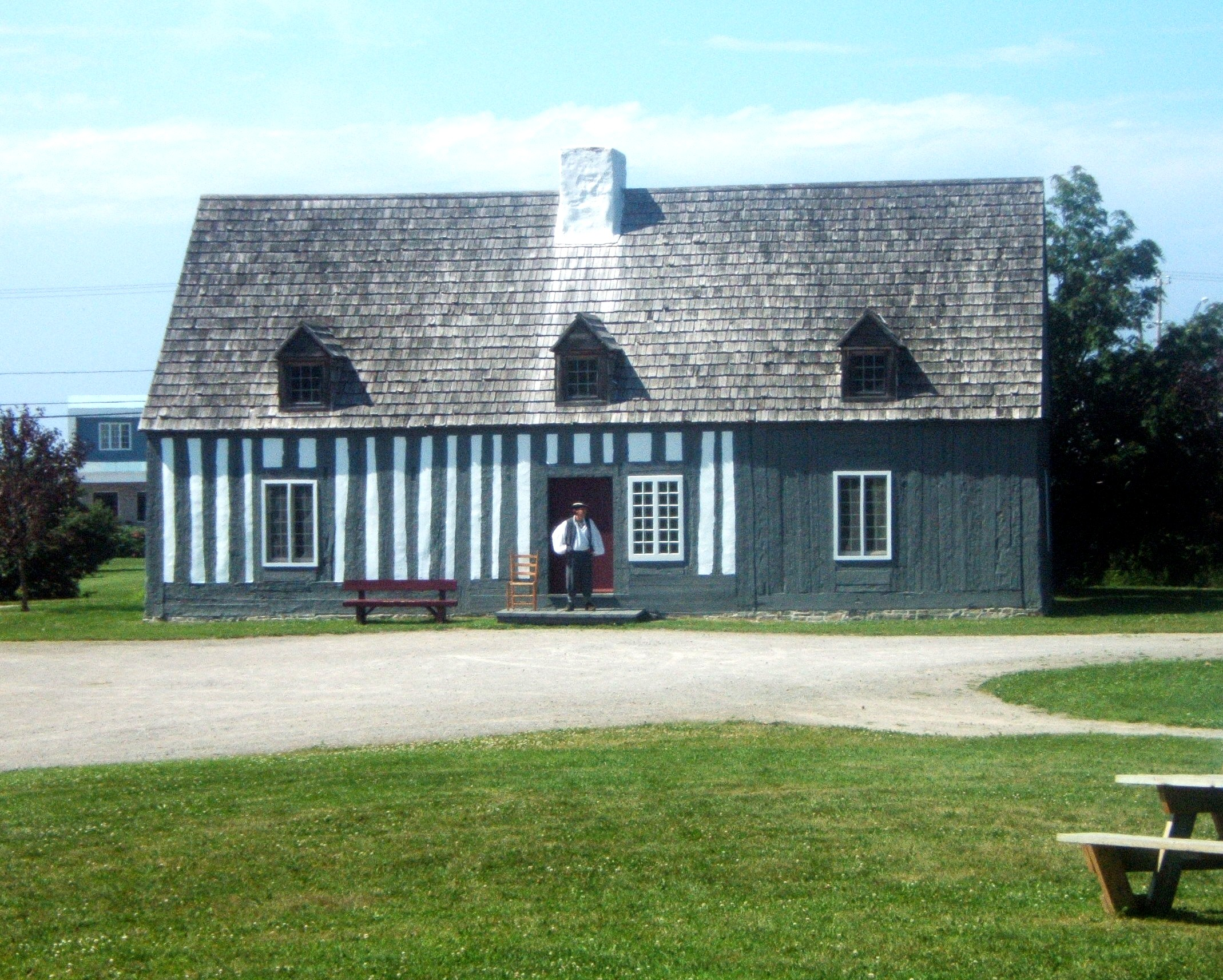
Maison Lamontagne in Rimouski

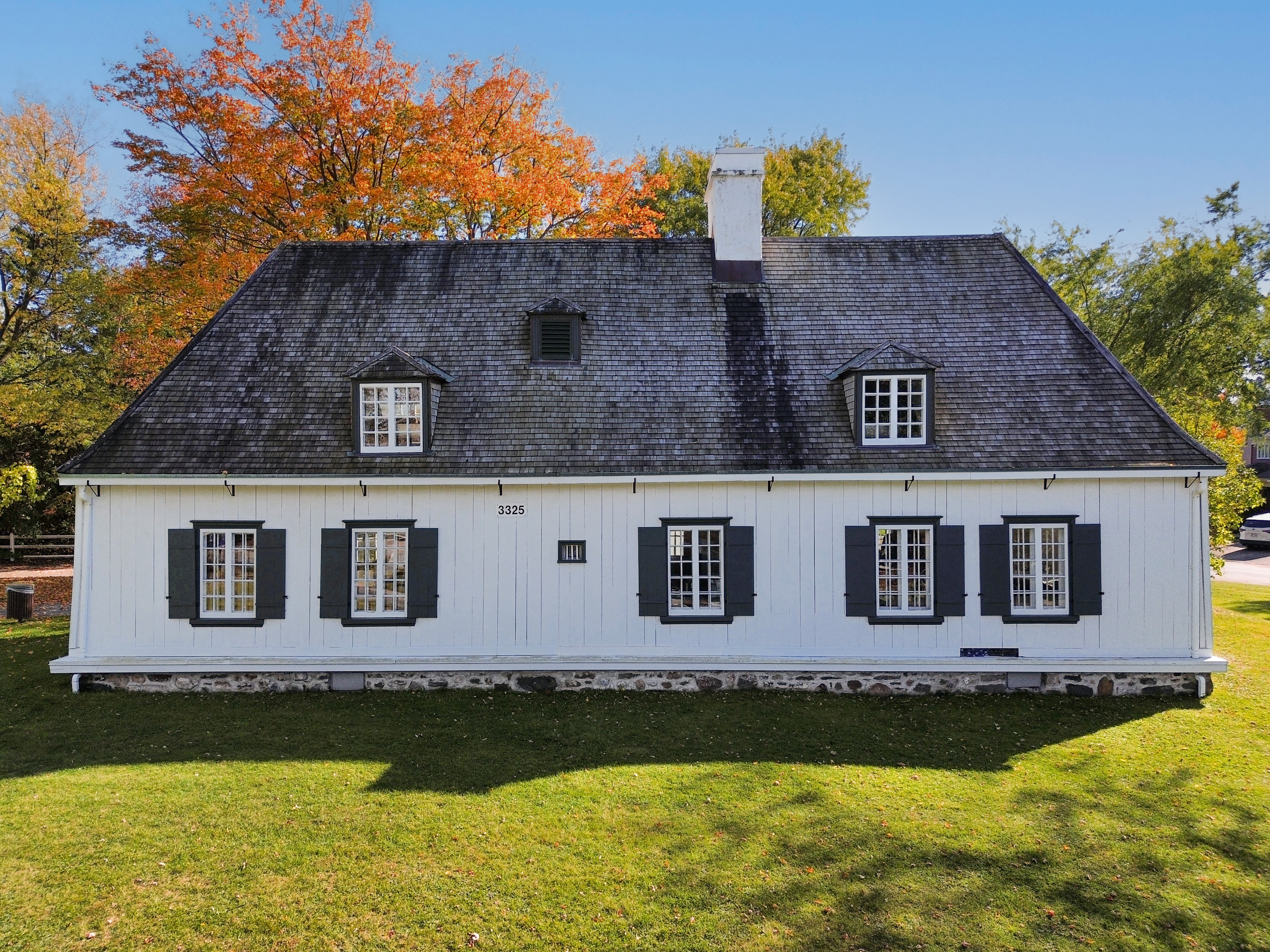
Maison Routhier in Sainte-Foy

== Arrival of the French ==
The first non Natives to inhabit what would become Canada were the French settlers of New France and Acadia. The initial settlements at Port Royal and Quebec City were most concerned with defense, against both First Nations and the English. For most of the early history of Quebec city it was dominated by the large fortress and outer walls. The city was divided into two sections. The Upper Town was home to the fortress, Intendant's house, and churches, these structures were built of stone in imitation of the Baroque architecture then popular in France. The Lower Town consisted of densely packed structures on narrow streets, and was the commercial centre and home to the workers.

== Religious architecture ==
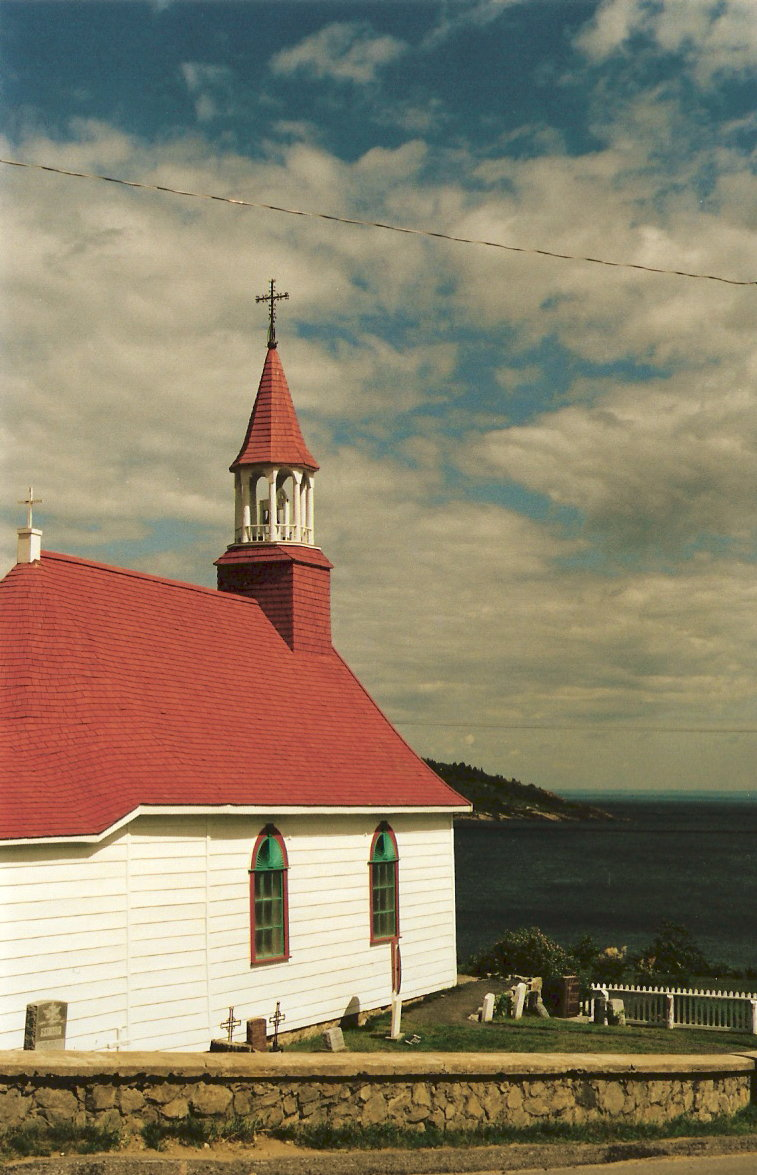
The small chapel of Tadoussac dominates the entrance of the Saguenay River. Constructed in 1747, it is the oldest wooden church in North America.

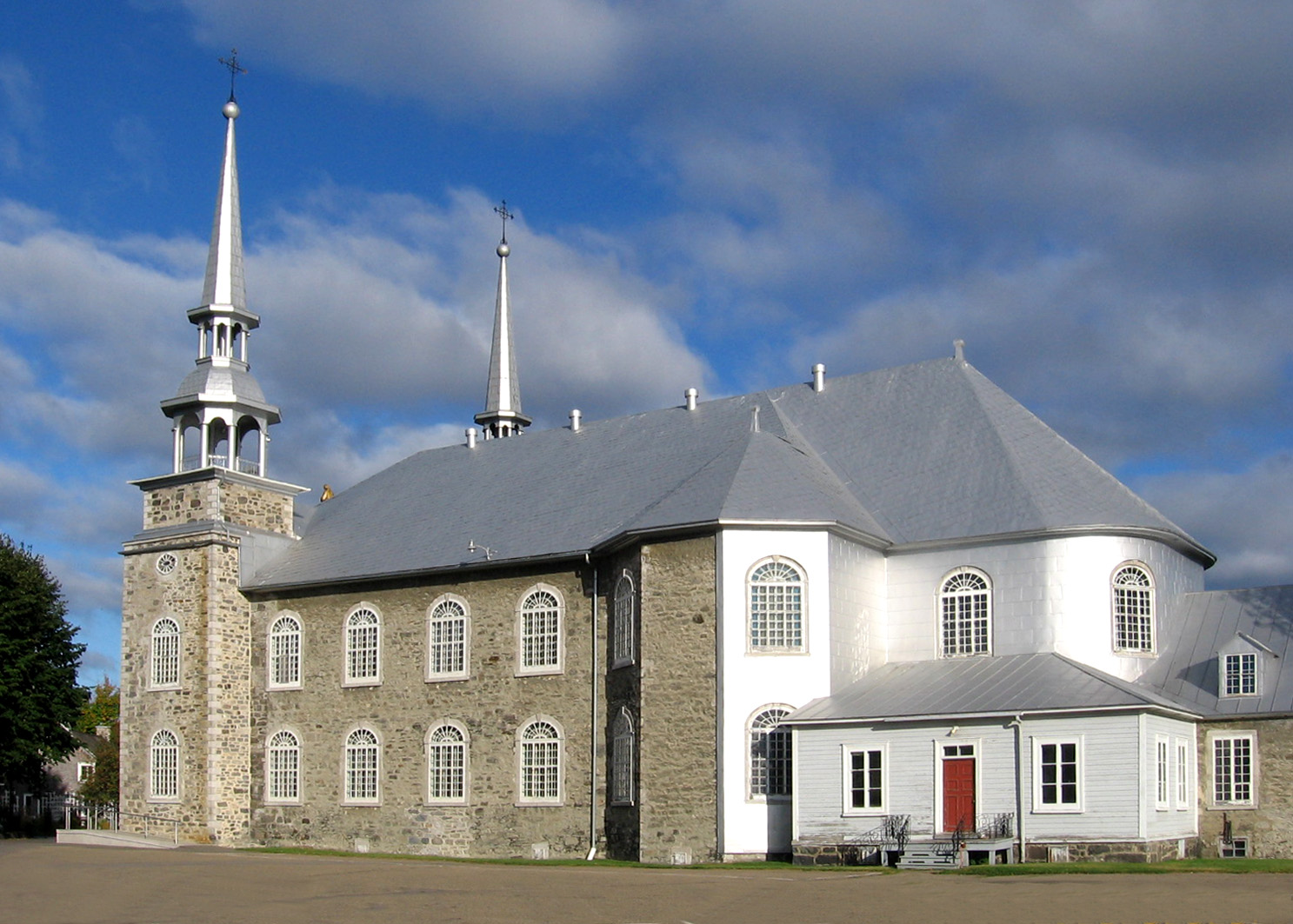
Deschambault Church

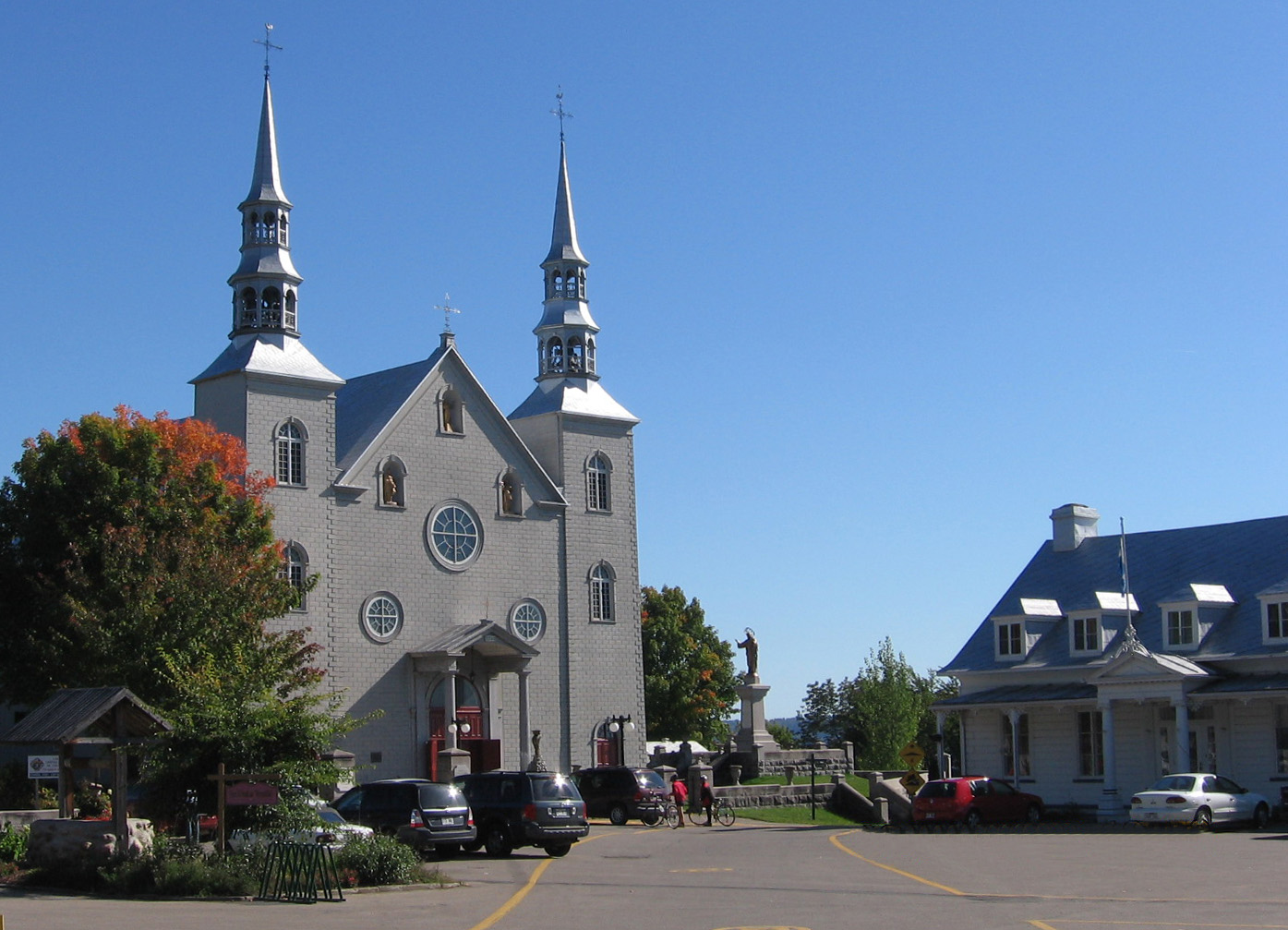
Cap-Santé Church

Famous for its religious heritage, Quebec has some of the most beautiful Catholic churches of North America. There are no fewer than 122 religious buildings named historic monuments by the Quebec government.

Founded as a Roman Catholic French colony and nicknamed "the city of a hundred spires," Montréal is renowned for its churches. The city has four Roman Catholic basilicas: the Marie-Reine-du-Monde Cathedral, the Notre-Dame Basilica, St. Patrick Basilica, the Saint Joseph's Oratory. The Saint Joseph's Oratory is the largest church in Canada, with the largest dome of its kind in the world after that of Saint Peter's Basilica in Rome. Other famous churches include the Notre-Dame-de-Bon-Secours Chapel, which is sometimes called "The Sailors' Church."

After the British victory in the Seven Years' War, Protestant immigrants came to Montreal from England, Scotland, Ireland. and the American colonies. Different Protestant churches were built to meet growing community. The two most important of them are of Saint James United Church and the Anglican Church Christ Church Cathedral, which was suspended over a well dug during the construction of a shopping centre, Promenades Cathedrale, that is part of the Montreal underground city.

== New France ==
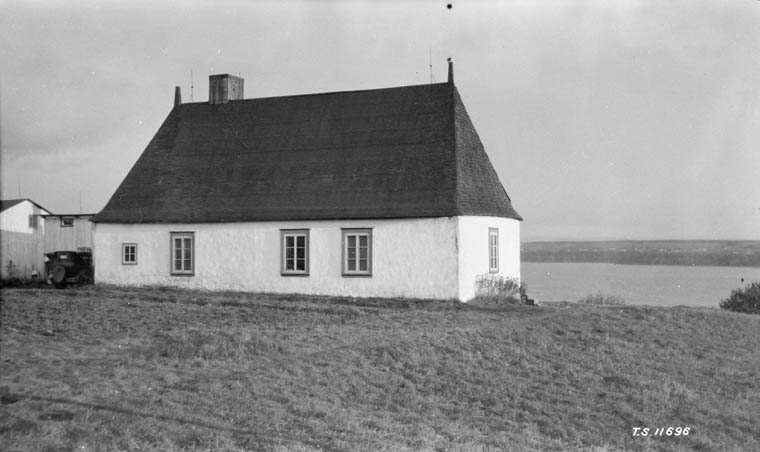
A classic rural New France home on the Île d'Orléans

Hundreds of family houses were built during the period of New France. This particular style houses date back to the 17th and 18th centuries and occurs especially in Quebec City, Île d'Orléans, and along the countryside. They were specially built to withstand cold weather and look very much like the Normandy houses.

The Canadiens built several villages, especially in Wisconsin, Michigan, and the Pays des Illinois.

Sainte-Geneviève is the oldest permanent village in Missouri. It was founded towards the end of the 1730s by Canadiens about three kilometres to the South of its current location on the banks of the Mississippi River (a mural at the State Capitol of Missouri indicates its founding in 1735). This is one of the first cities located west of the Mississippi River and North of New Orleans in Louisiana, which would be transferred during its sale from Napoleon to the United States.

The oldest buildings of Sainte-Geneviève were therefore all built during the Spanish occupation although it is typical French colonial buildings. The most representative buildings of the period rely on poles of wood planted vertically in the ground while the traditional colonial American huts were consisted of assembled horizontally logs.

One of the most characteristic traditional houses of the city are the "poles in the earth" in which the walls made of wooden planks do not support the floor. The latter relies on stone pillars. The walls of those types of houses, partly buried in the ground, are particularly susceptible to flooding, termites and rot. Three of the five houses of this type still exist in the United States are located in Sainte-Geneviève. The other two are located in Pascagoula (Mississippi) and Natchitoches Parish, Louisiana. Most of the old buildings of the city are "poles in the earth" in which the wooden structure is placed on raised brick foundation stones.

The oldest house in the city is the, Bolduc House, which was built in 1770 on the original site of the city and was then moved and enlarged in 1785.

A festival takes place every year during the second weekend in August to celebrate the French cultural heritage. The ferry that crosses the Mississippi River is nicknamed ""the French Connection"" because of its link to other sites of the region's francophone past.

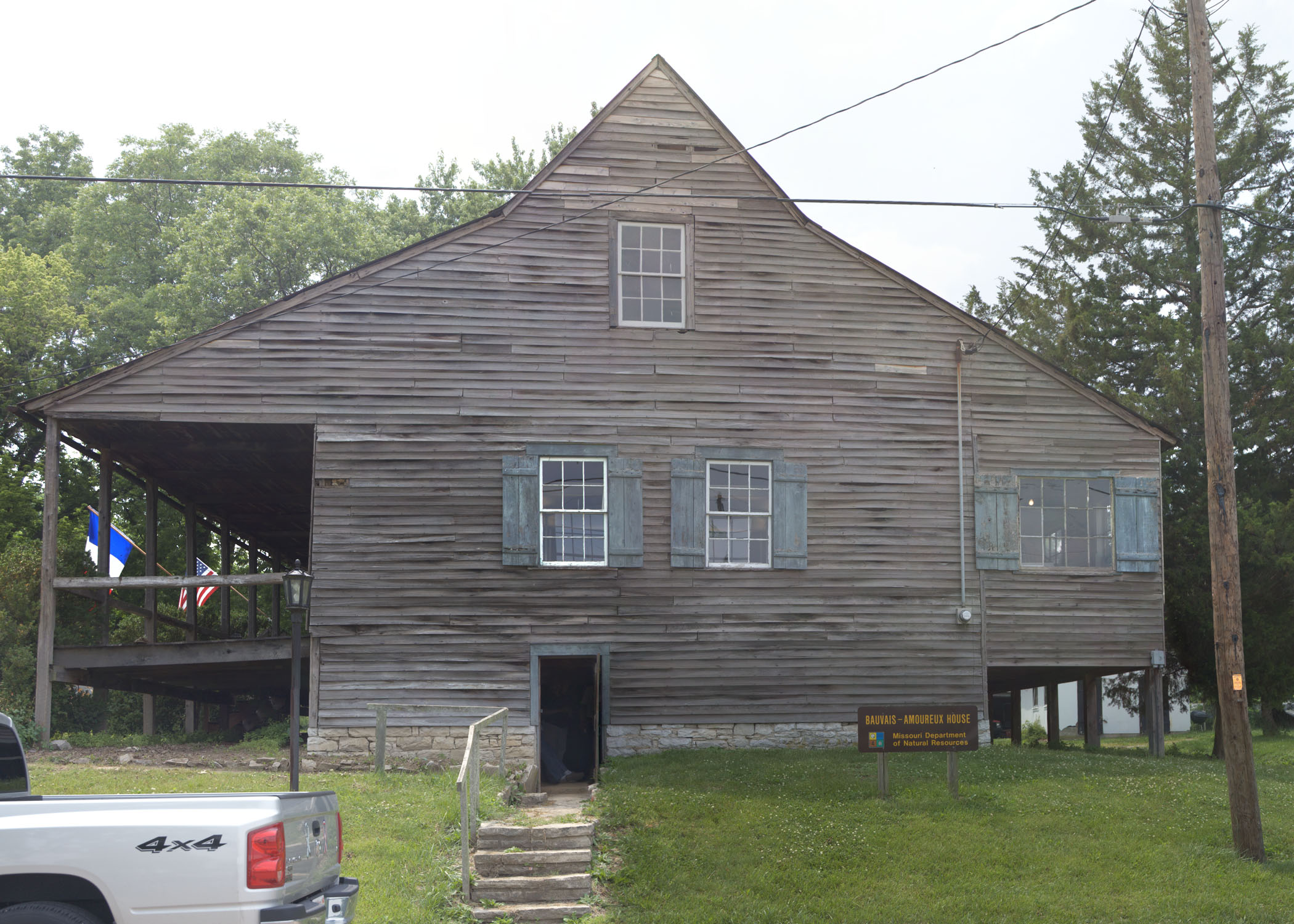
The Amoureaux house

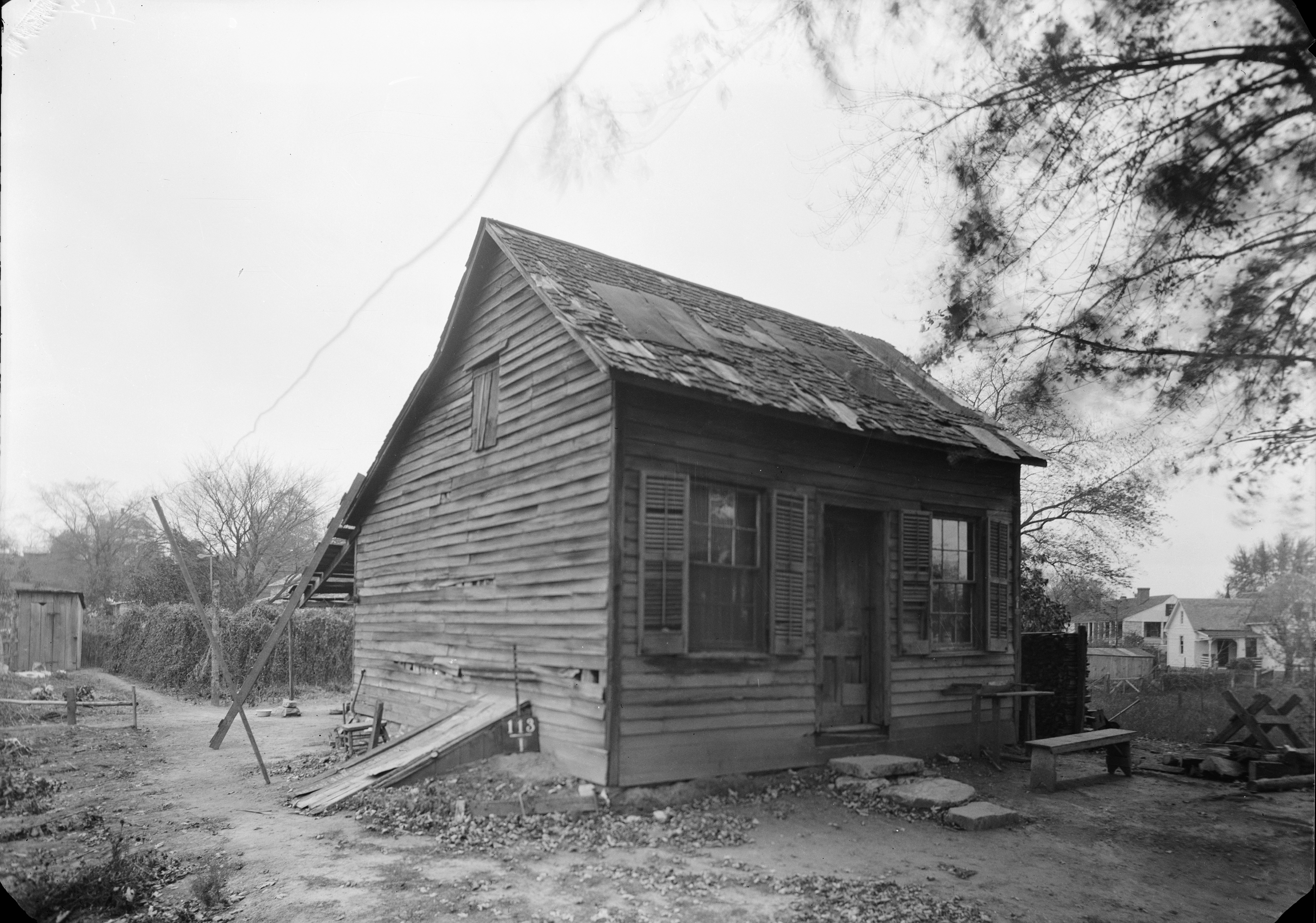
The Amoureaux caban

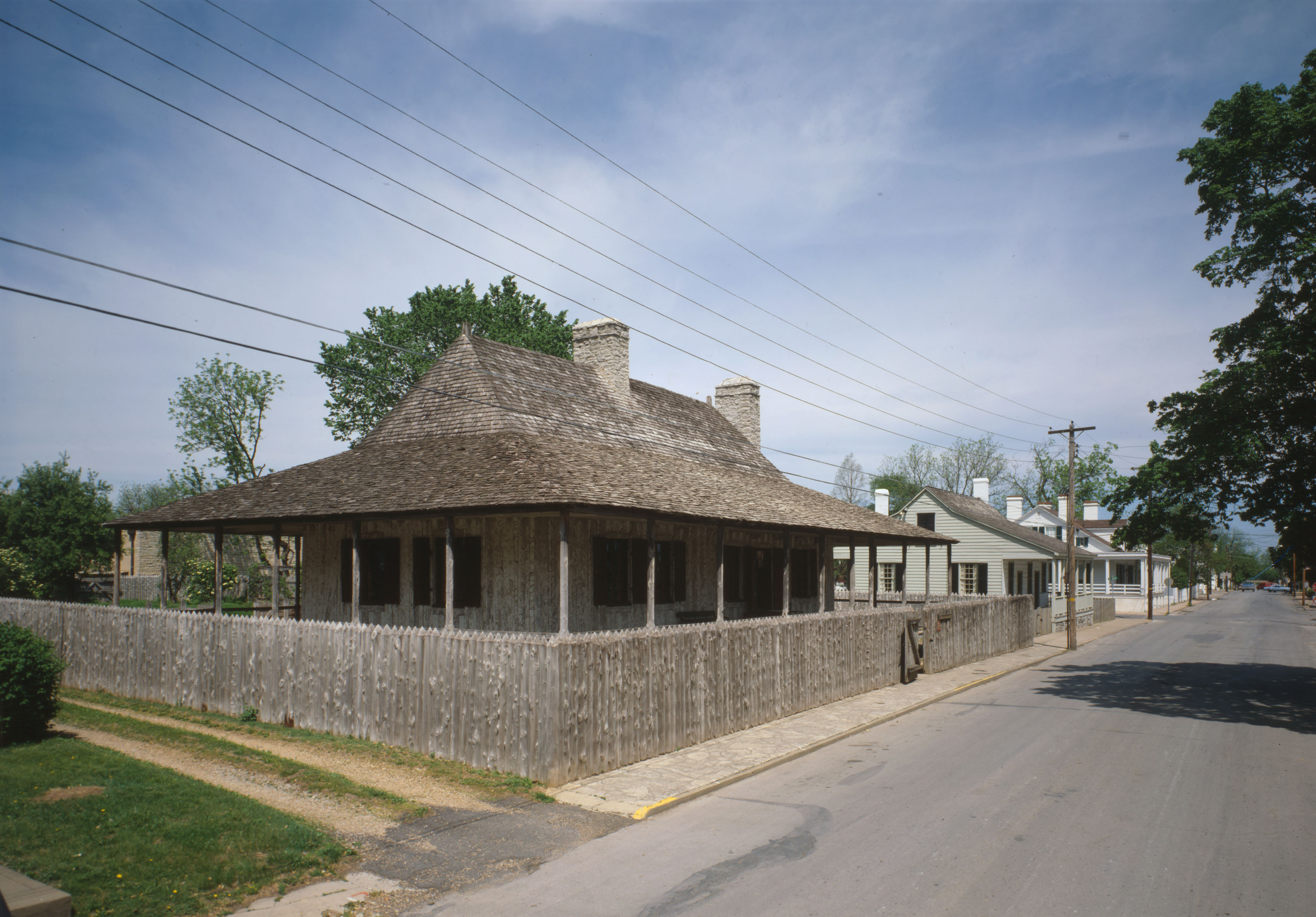
Bolduc house

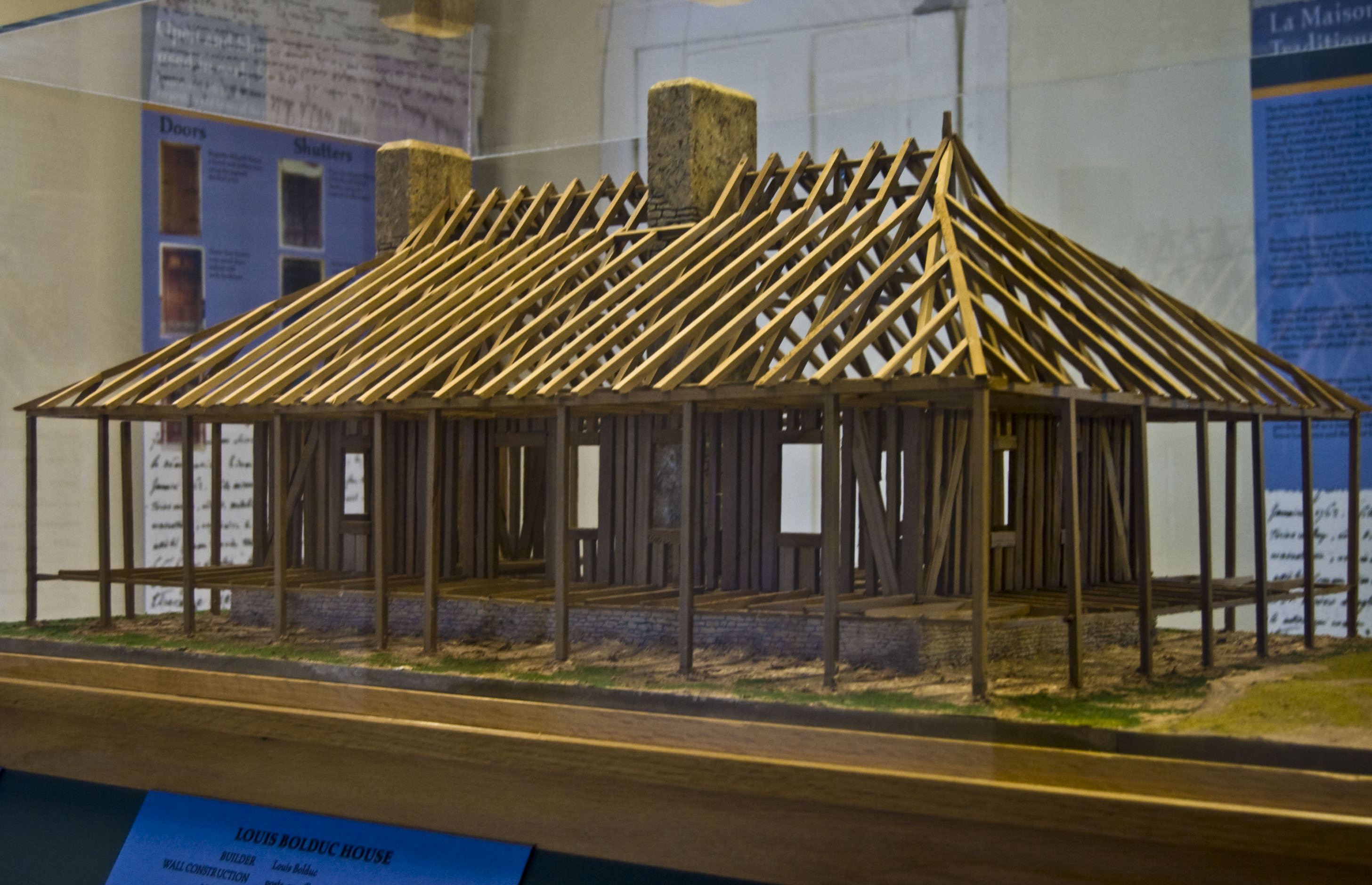
Bolduc house, example of the technic used poles in the earth

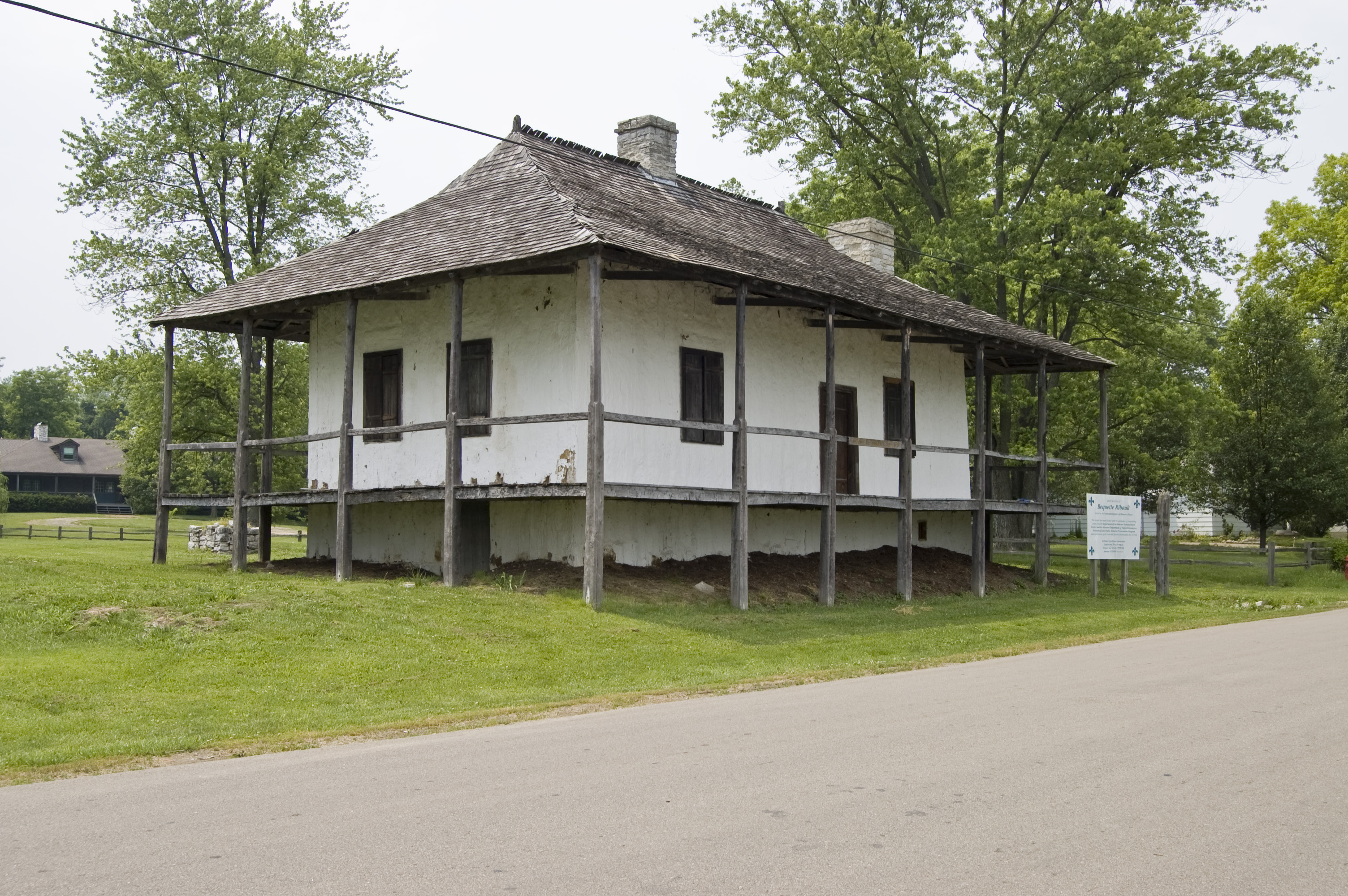
Bequette-Ribault house, 1789, after restoration.

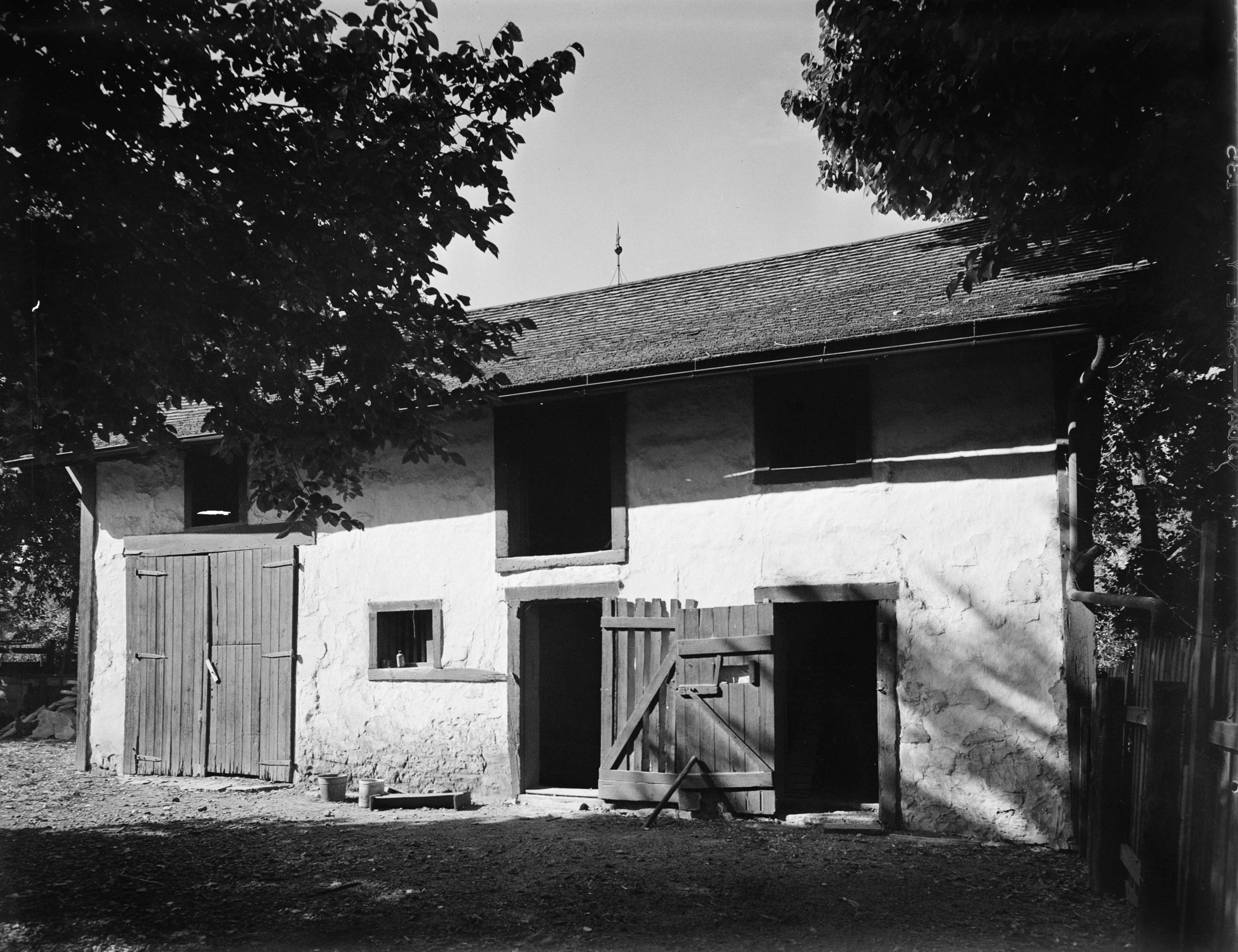
Barn of Jean-Baptiste Valle

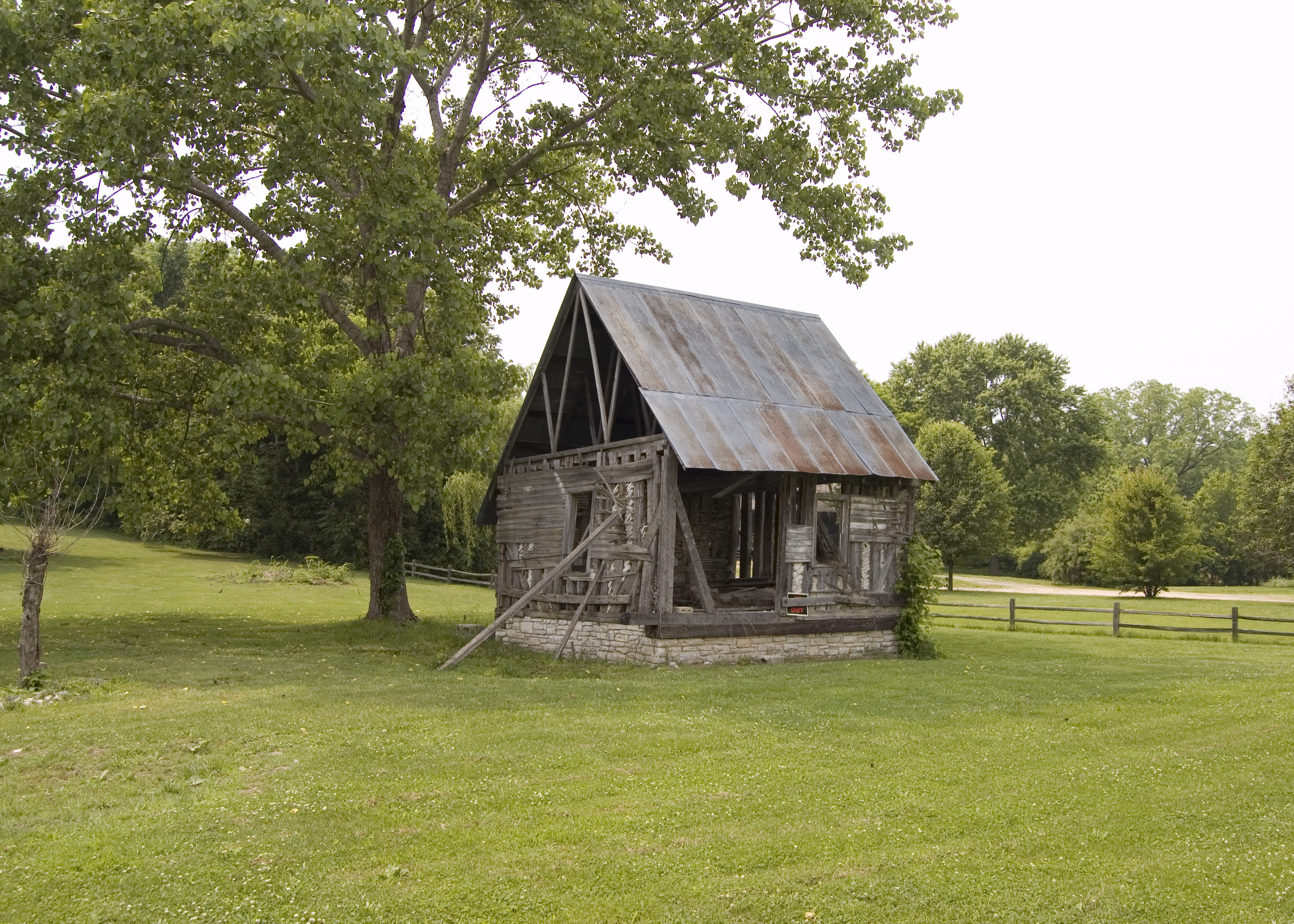
Caban of Lasource-Durand

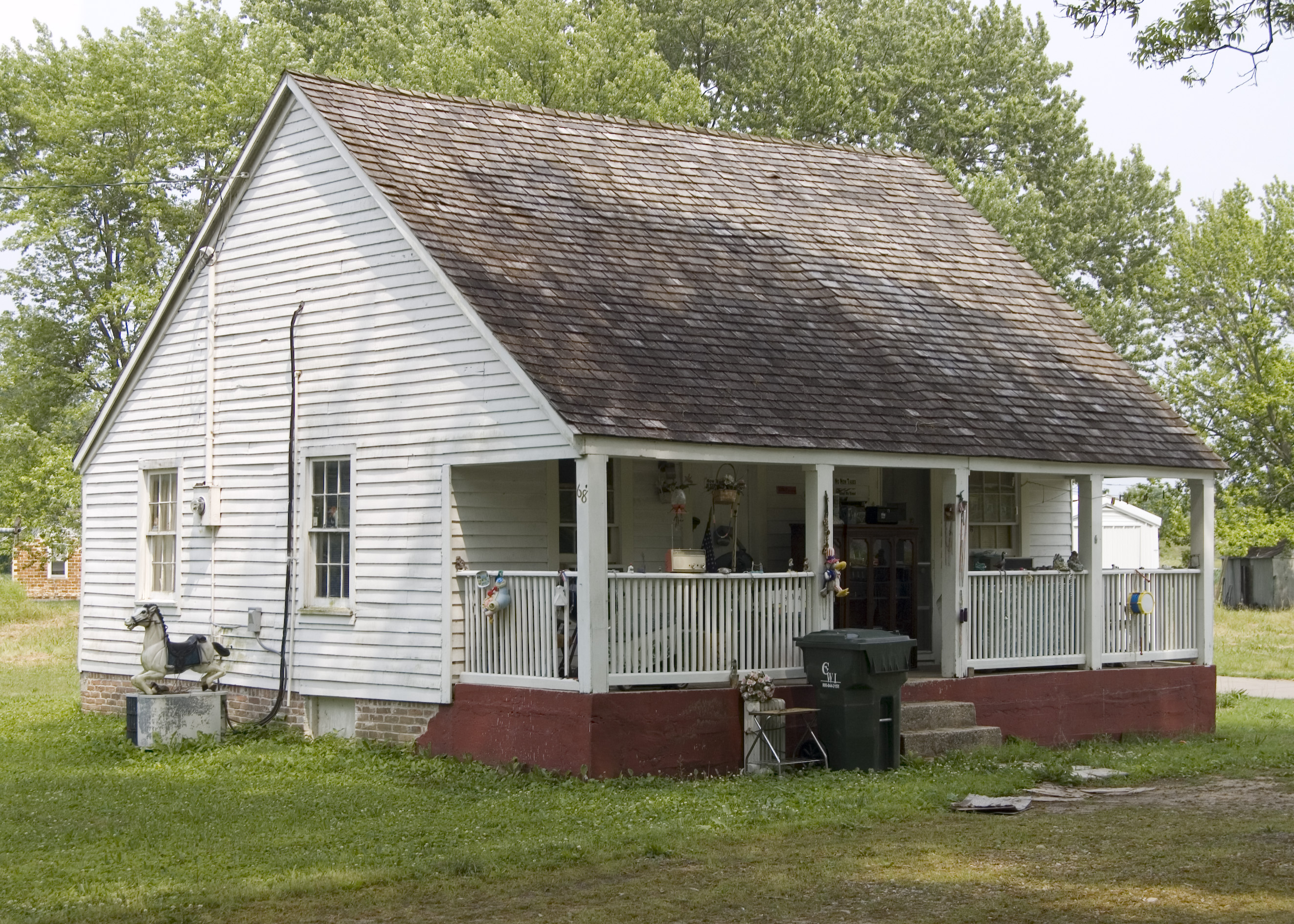
House near Gabouri Creek

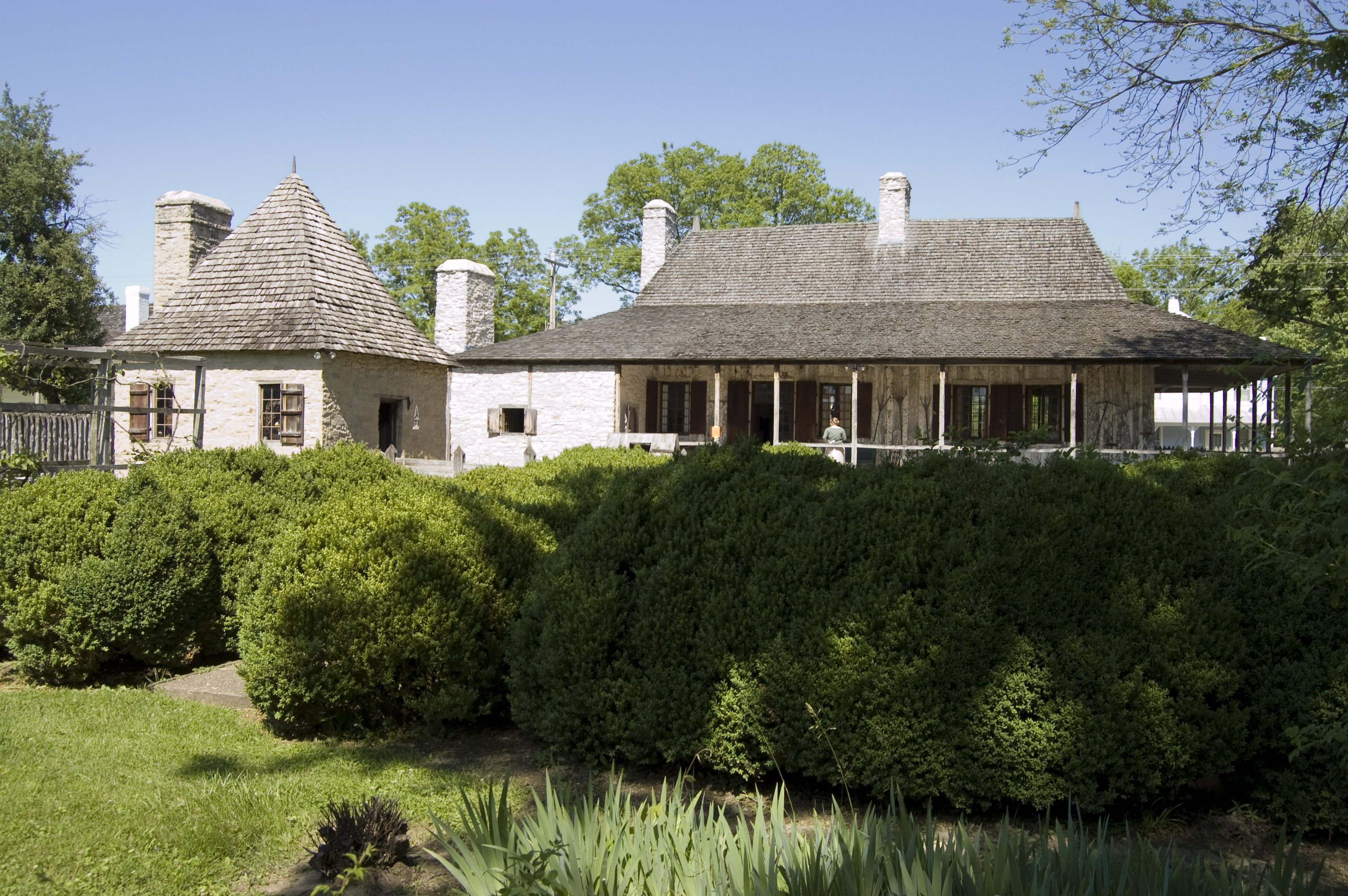
Louis Bolduc House Museum, 1792.

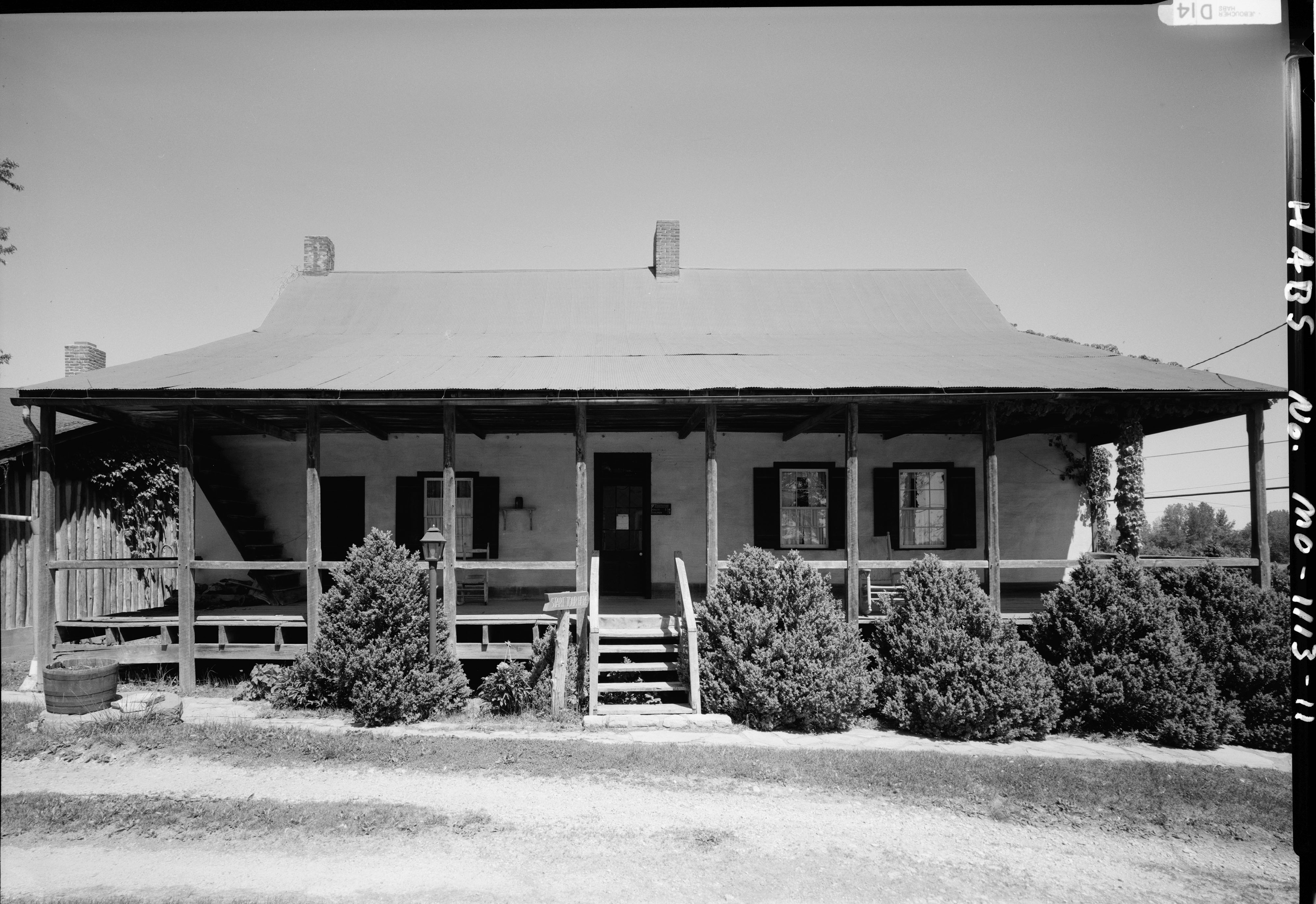
Bauvais-Amoureaux house, 1792, example of Poles in the earth.

== See also ==
- List of Quebec architects
- Canadian Centre for Architecture
- Ernest Cormier
- Architecture of Quebec City
- List of old Montreal buildings
- Architecture of Canada
- List of old Canadian buildings
