= Marlborough Apartments =

Coordinates: 45.50696°N 73.57562°W

- Appartements Marlborough (French)
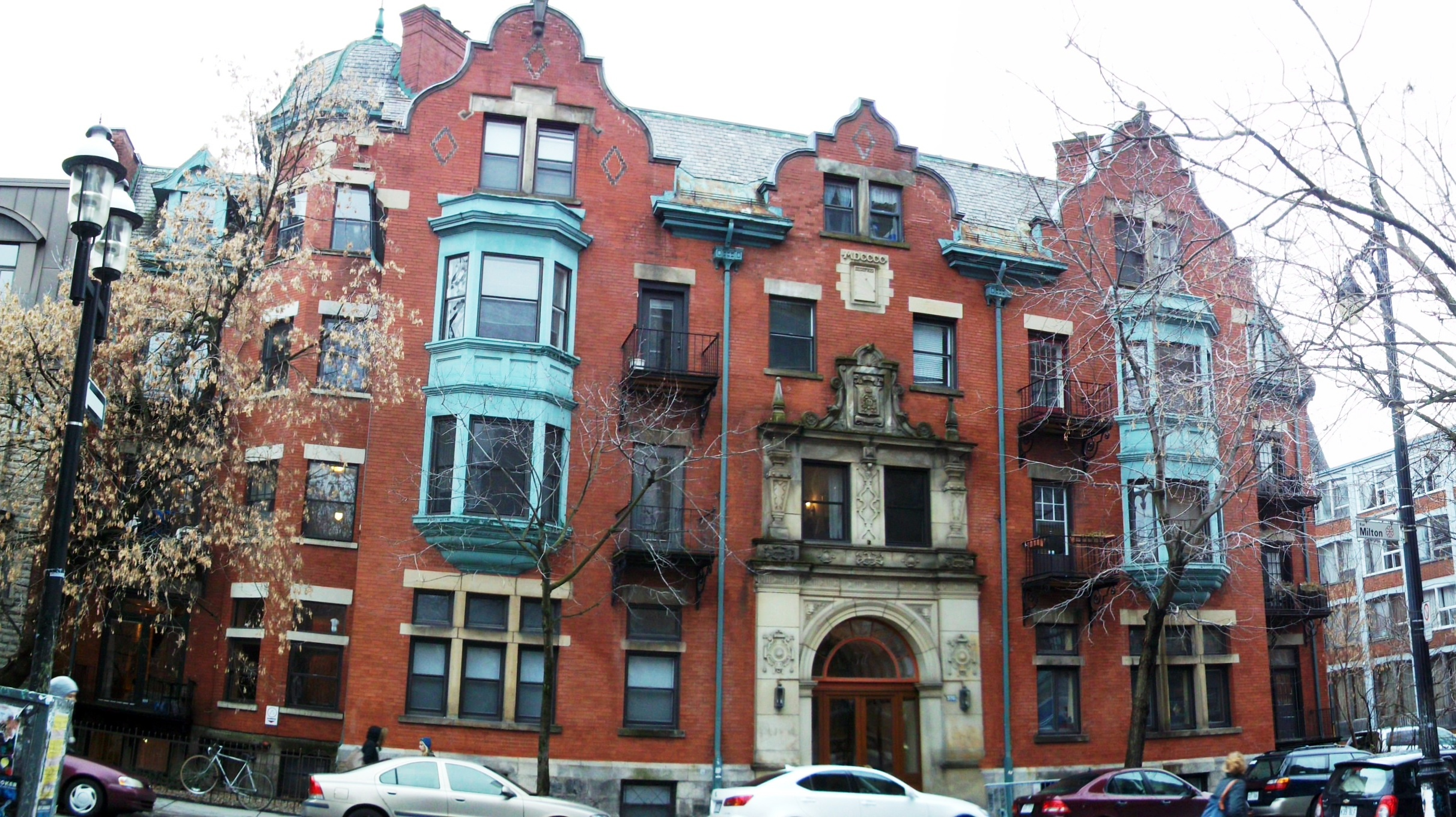

General information
- Type: Apartment building
- Architectural style: Queen Anne Revival
- Location: Montreal, Canada
- Completed: 1900

Height
- Height: 4 storeys

Design and construction
- Architecture firm: Taylor and Gordon

National Historic Site of Canada
- Official name: Marlborough Apartments
- Designated: 1990

Marlborough Apartments (French: Appartements Marlborough) is a historic apartment building in Montreal, Quebec, Canada. It is located at 570 Rue Milton in the Milton Park neighbourhood, close to McGill University. It was designated a National Historic Site of Canada on November 16, 1990.

== Description ==
Built in 1900, the apartment building is four storeys tall and its façade is red brick. The building was designed by architects Taylor and Gordon, and its architecture is considered to be Queen Anne Revival.

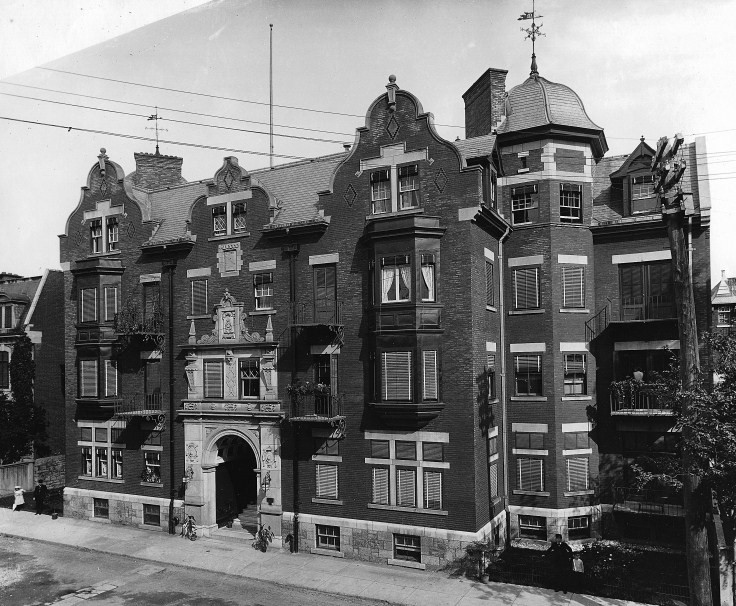
The building in 1902

== In popular culture ==
The building's front entrance and façade were used prominently in the 2004 Québécois film Love and Magnets (Les Aimants in French), directed by Yves Pelletier.
