= François-Xavier Berlinguet =

Canadian wood-carver, engineer and architect (1830–1916)

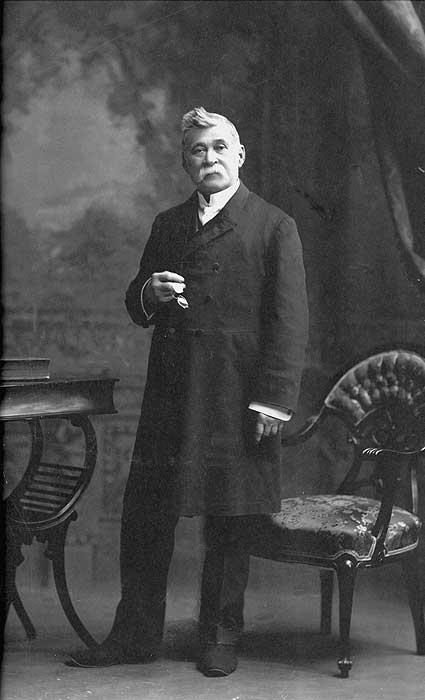
- Born: 4 December 1830
- Died: 3 August 1916 (aged 85)
- Occupation: Architect

François-Xavier Berlinguet (4 December 1830 – 3 August 1916) was a Canadian wood-carver, engineer, and architect.

François-Xavier Berlinguet had studied wood-carving and its architectural applications with his father while growing up in the Quebec City area. His father had trained with Louis Quévillon. He studied architecture with Thomas Baillairgé and also Charles Baillairgé.

Berlinguet's engineering importance became recognized when, in 1870, he began building a large section of the Intercolonial Railway.

François-Xavier's career in construction covered nearly sixty years. In architectural pursuits his design work was important, varied and substantial.

== See also ==
- List of Quebec architects
- Architecture of Canada
