= Milton Park, Montreal =

Milton Park
- Neighbourhood
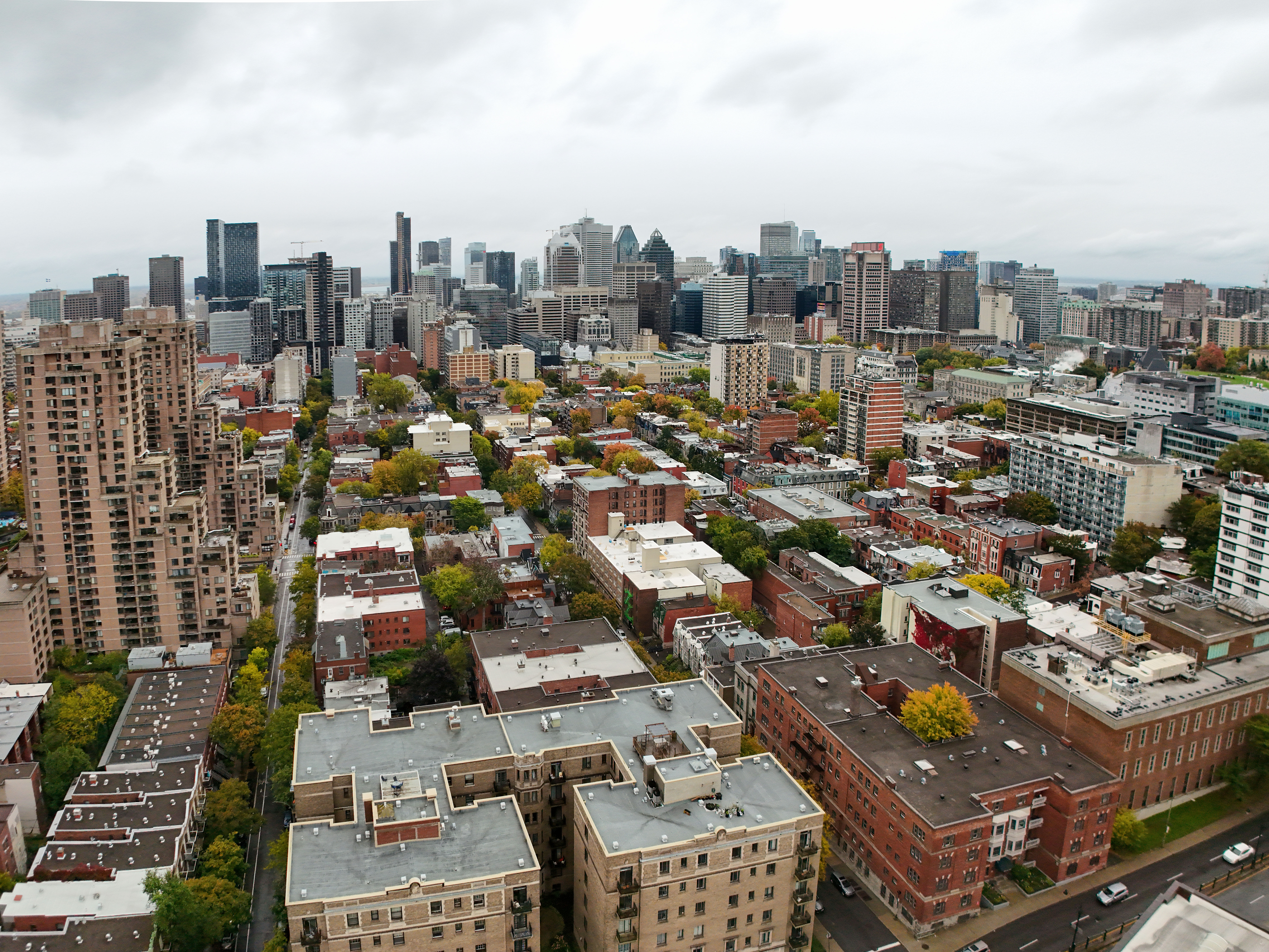
- Aerial view looking southeast towards Downtown Montreal

- Location of Milton Park in Montreal
- Coordinates: 45.5083°N 73.5747°W
- Country: Canada
- Province: Quebec
- City: Montreal
- Borough: Le Plateau-Mont-Royal

Area
  - Total: 0.52 km^{2} (0.20 sq mi)
  - Land: 0.52 km^{2} (0.20 sq mi)

Population (2016)
  - Total: 10,948
  - Density: 21,000/km^{2} (55,000/sq mi)
- Postal Code: H2X
- Area codes: 514, 438

Milton Park (French: Milton-Parc), is a neighbourhood in Montreal, Quebec, Canada. It is named after the neighbourhood's two main streets, Milton Street and Park Avenue. It is situated directly to the east of the McGill University campus in the borough of Plateau-Mont-Royal. The area is roughly bordered by University Street and the university campus to the west, Sherbrooke Street to the south, Pine Avenue to the north, and Park Avenue and the Lower Plateau neighbourhood to the east, though McGill University considers this area to extend as far east as Saint Laurent Boulevard or just short of Saint-Louis Square.

The neighbourhood has many historic townhouses built in the late 19th century, which housed affluent businessmen and their families. The area remained a wealthy enclave throughout the early half of the 20th century. Smaller rental apartments became more popular after World War II, leading to increased diversity and biligualism. Today, the neighbourhood is highly bilingual, though the majority of residents are anglophone.

Though the neighbourhood consists largely of permanent residents, many McGill students live in this area, which is characterized by a mix of rowhouses and low- to mid-rise apartment buildings. The area has many small businesses catering to the needs of the local community, including The Word Bookstore, Café Lola Rosa, several small convenience stores, as well as many "third place" hangouts.

== McGill Ghetto ==
Milton Park is colloquially known as the McGill Ghetto, or simply as the Student Ghetto. Being just east of McGill University's downtown campus, the name comes from the neighbourhood's high concentration of McGill students. The moniker is unpopular amongst long-term residents, notably the Milton-Parc Citizens’ Committee, owing largely to the negative stigma surrounding the word "ghetto" and the threat of gentrification associated with a large student population.

The Students’ Society of McGill University, the Milton-Parc Citizens Committee and McGill University developed the Community Action and Relations Endeavour (CARE) in 2010 to improve relations between student and the permeant residents of Milton Parc. Both the McGill students association and the Milton-Parc Citizens Committee reject the term "McGill Ghetto" on the grounds that the neighbourhood is a distinct entity from the University. The endeavour includes education about the neighbourhood's history for students, and the organization of public events intended to foster community between students and residents.

Montreal's historic Jewish "Ghetto" coincides in part with the present student Ghetto, meeting at the intersection of Duluth and Saint Laurent.

== Development ==
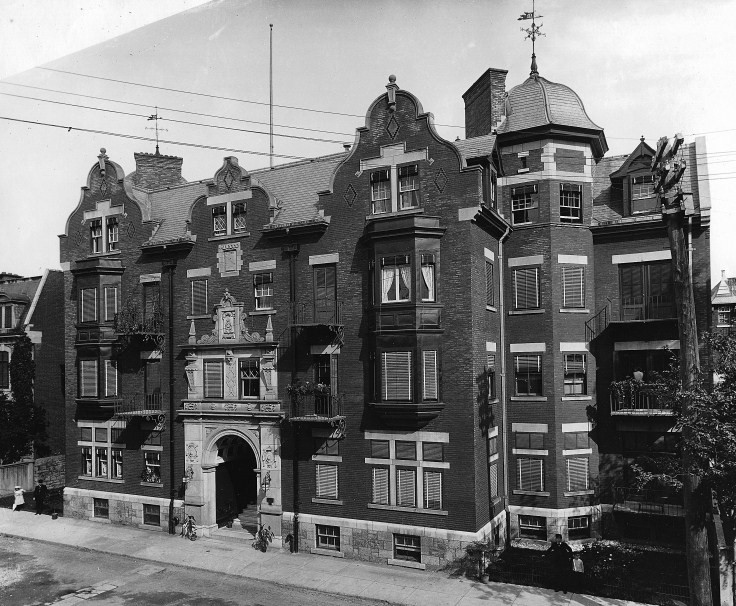
Marlborough Apartments in 1902

Development in Milton Park began in the 1860s, when Les Religieuses Hospitalières de Saint-Joseph built Hôtel-Dieu (now located north of the neighbourhood, at Rue Saint-Urbain and Ave des Pins). The area was otherwise populated by British merchants, and the area remained popular amongst the upper-middle class until the mid 20th century.

After World War II, many of the affluent residents of the area moved to other boroughs such as Westmount and Outremont. Remaining landlords subdivided their units to combat rising property values, resulting in smaller units that appealed to McGill students as well as both English and French young-professionals, low-income and single-parent families, pensioners, and new immigrants.

In the 1960s, Concordia Estates proposed a development plan for the area, called La Cité. The plan included the demolishment of a 6 block area of the city, and the construction of a 50-story residential and office space, as well as other recreational and consumer spaces. While this plan was originally rejected by the city, Concordia Estates continued to purchase 96% of Milton Park between 1958-1968. This plan would have pushed out many long-term residents of the neighbourhood, who formed the Milton-Park Citizen’s Committee (MPCC) in 1968 in opposition to this plan. Though the first phase of the project was completed in 1976, community backlash, changing by-laws, and city construction scandals, made the project untenable. The Milton-Parc Citizens’ Committee, partnered with Heritage Montreal, eventually purchased and renovated the remaining buildings as part of a housing project backed by the Canada Mortgage and Housing Corporation, the City of Montreal, and the Quebec Government. Despite various issues, 14 co-operatives and 7 non-profits were established in Milton Park by 1983, forming the largest housing co-operative project in Canada.

McGill University acquired the hotel component of La Cité (at Park and Prince Arthur) in 2003 and transformed it into an undergraduate student residence called New Residence Hall. La Cité also has a gym Club La Cité with an outdoor pool open year long and cross-training facilities. In 2009, McGill University purchased a second hotel (Four-Points on Sherbrooke) and transformed it into another student residence for use starting in the 2009–2010 school year. This residence is now called Carrefour Sherbrooke by the university, though the nickname "C4" is often used instead, both by students and the McGill administration alike.

== Exhibitions ==
- Milton-Parc: How We Did It, Canadian Centre for Architecture, Montreal (2019)
- Les Jardins des femmes, Peter Gou-hua Fu School of Architecture, Montreal (2019)

== See also ==
- Student ghetto
- Le Plateau-Mont-Royal
