= List of oldest buildings and structures in Montreal =

This list of the oldest buildings and structures lists the oldest buildings still standing in Montreal, Quebec, Canada along with their year of completion.

Building	Year completed	Builder	Location	Image
LeBer-LeMoyne House	1671	Jacques Le Ber and Charles Le Moyne	Lachine	
Saint-Sulpice Seminary	1687	François Dollier de Casson	Old Montreal	View of the Saint-Sulpice Seminary main entrance
Sulpician Towers / Fort de la Montagne	1694	François Vachon de Belmont	Golden Square Mile	Exterior view of one of the Sulpician Towers
Saint-Gabriel House	1698	Victor Depocas	Pointe-Saint-Charles	View of Maison Saint-Gabriel
Maison Descaris	1700			
Château Ramezay	1705	Claude de Ramezay	rue Notre-Dame Est	
Pointe-Claire Windmill	1709			
Pointe-aux-Trembles Windmill	1719			
Hurtubise House	1739			
Church of La Visitation-de-la-Bienheureuse-Vierge-Marie	1752			
Auberge Le Saint-Gabriel	1754			
Grey Nuns' Hospital	1765			
Notre-Dame-de-Bon-Secours Chapel	1771			

== See also ==
- Architecture of Montreal
- List of National Historic Sites of Canada in Montreal
