= Michael Fish (architect) =

Canadian architect and urban conservationist

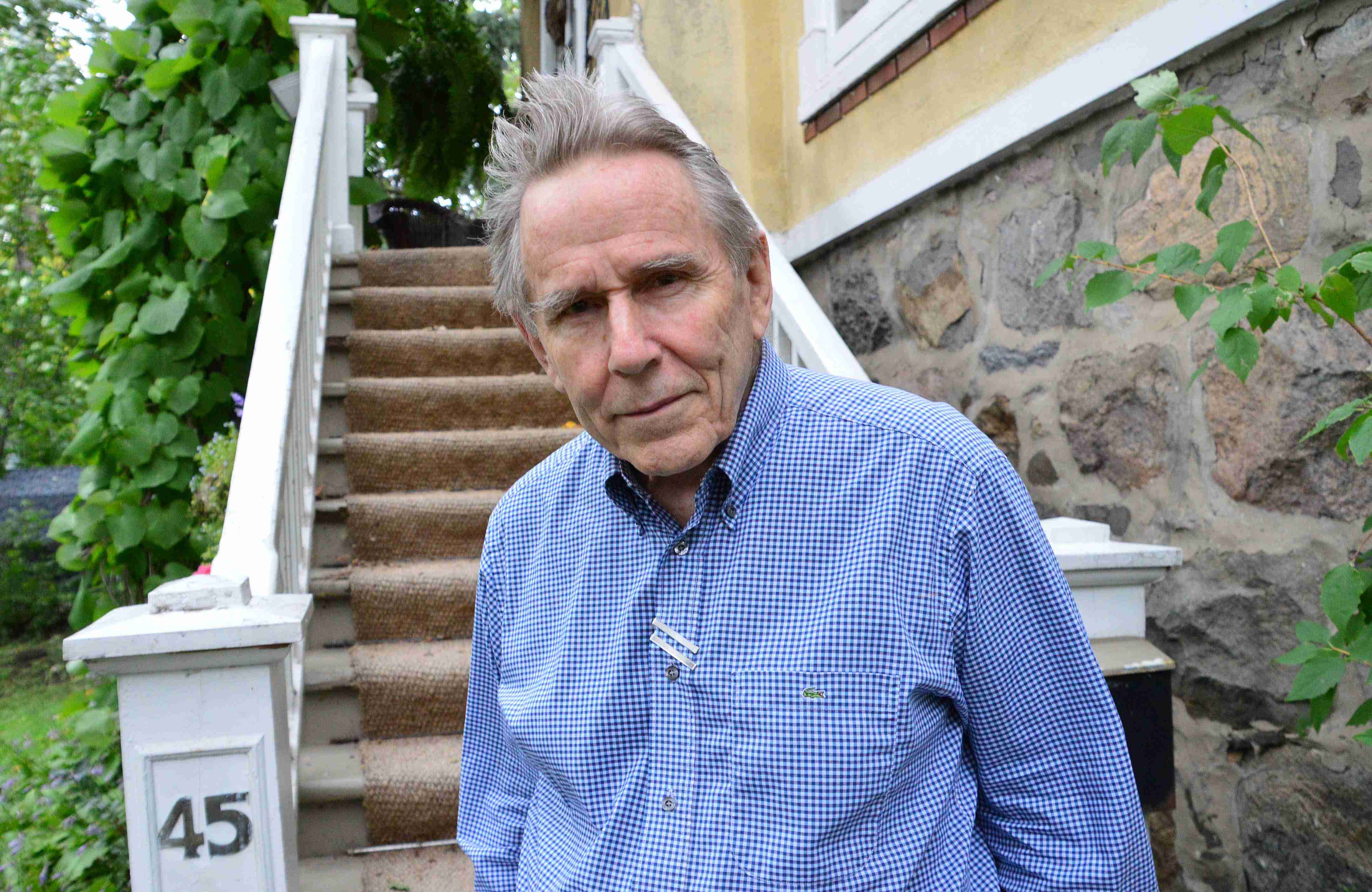
- Montreal architect Michael Fish
- Born: 1934 (age 91–92)
- Occupation: Architect
- Awards: "significant contribution to heritage preservation in Quebec"; Montreal city medal

Michael James S. Fish (born October 23, 1934) is a Canadian architect and urban conservationist, best known for his attempts to preserve heritage buildings in Montreal, Quebec, Canada.

== Biography ==
Michael Fish began his career in Montreal in 1956, mostly involved in new apartment building construction. Soon, he developed an interest in renovating established buildings rather than constructing after demolition. He noted that it was less expensive and less disruptive to the cohesion of neighbourhoods. He became involved in community groups that advocated to save structures such as the Van Horne Mansion.

In 1970, Fish co-founded Friends of Windsor Station with architect Peter Lanken and urban-planning professor Jean-Claude Marsan. In 1974, he co-founded Save Montreal. He has been credited with playing a major role in saving, or preventing major transformation of, such buildings as the Dawson College building at Sherbrooke and Atwater Streets, the Collège de Montréal on Sherbrooke Street, the Grey Nuns' quarters and church at René Lévesque Boulevard and Guy Street, and the patriotes' prison near the Jacques Cartier Bridge. In the mid-1980s, he served as vice-president of the Canadian International Council of Monuments and Sites, a United Nations affiliate.

After becoming more involved in political lobbying for marginalized groups, he found less and less work available to him from private developers, who saw conservationists as "a threat", according to him. In the latter part of his career, his firm worked only on social housing projects. He has stated that a highlight of his conservation work was saving a row of greystone houses on Jeanne Mance Street, south of Sherbrooke Street.

In 1989, he advocated for the preservation of Rockcliffe Airport hangars. Earlier in his career he had designed hangars for Canada's air force, and for Trans-Canada Air Lines.

== Awards ==
In 1987, he received acclaim for his "significant contribution to heritage preservation in Quebec" and was presented with a lieutenant-governor's award from Heritage Canada.

In 2003, he was presented with a Montreal city medal for his work with Save Montreal.

In 2024, he was given the Robert-Lionel-Seguin award of the Quebec's Association of Friends and Owners of Ancient Houses (APMAQ) for his exceptional contribution to the world of heritage buildings conservation in the province.
