= Architecture of Canada =

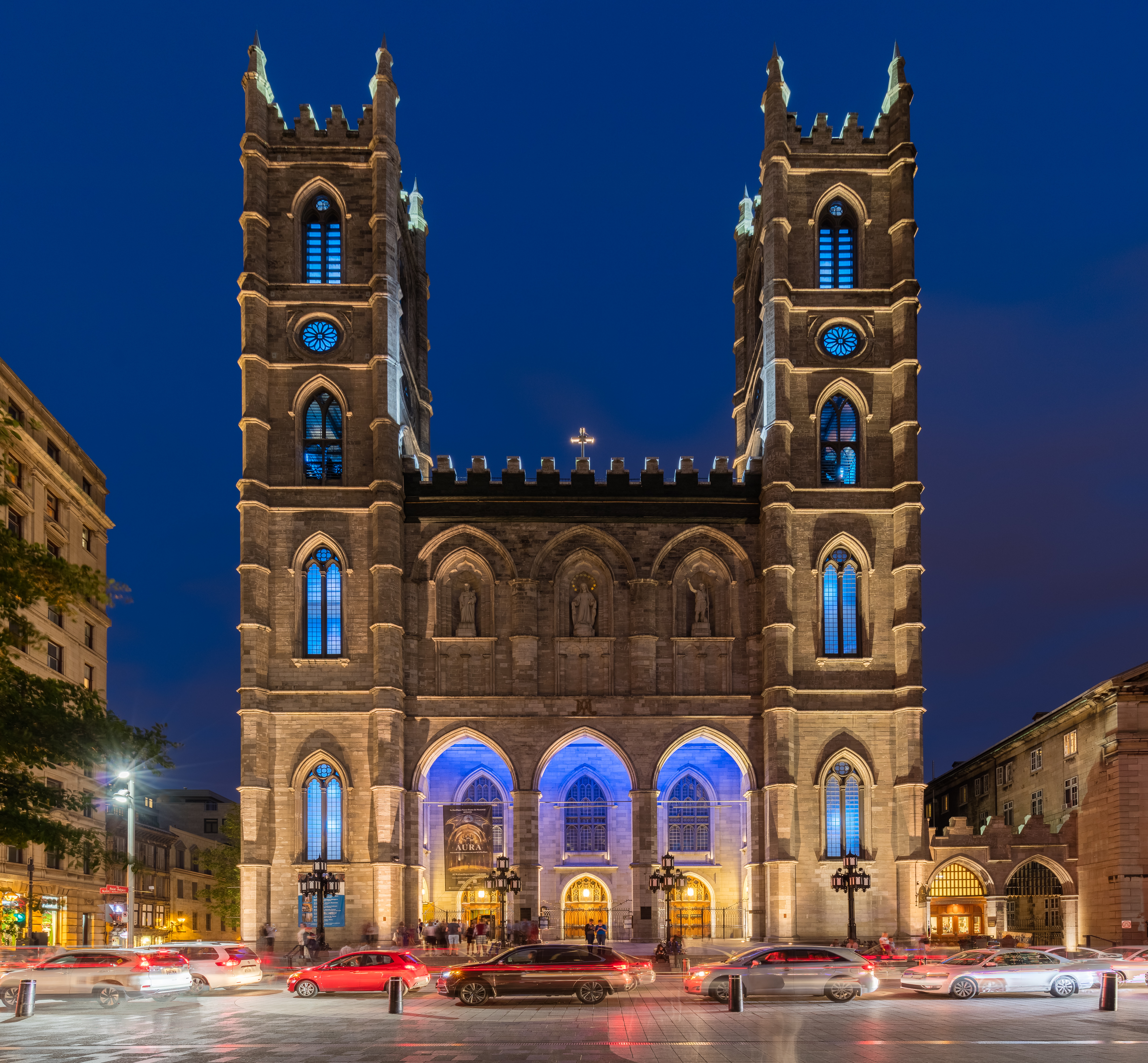
Notre-Dame Basilica, Montreal

The architecture of Canada is, with the exception of that of Canadian First Nations, closely linked to the techniques and styles developed in Canada, Europe and the United States. However, design has long needed to be adapted to Canada's climate and geography, and at times has also reflected the uniqueness of Canadian culture.

== History ==
=== First Nations ===
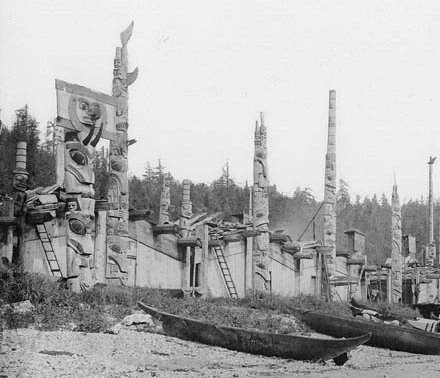
A group of Haida bighouses

Prior to the arrival of Europeans the First Nations lived in a wide array of structures. The semi-nomadic peoples of the Maritimes, Quebec, and Northern Ontario, such as the Mi'kmaq, Cree, and Algonquin generally lived in wigwams. These were wood-framed structures, covered with an outer layer of bark, reeds, or woven mats; usually in a cone shape although sometimes a dome. These groups changed locations every few weeks or months. They would take the outer layer of the wigwam with them, and leave the heavy wood frame in place. The frame could be reused if the tribe returned to the location at a later date.

Further south, in what is today Southern Ontario and Quebec, Iroquoian society lived in permanent and semi-permanent agricultural settlements holding several hundred to several thousand people. The standard form of housing was the long house. These were large structures, several times longer than they were wide holding a large number of people. They were built with a frame of saplings or branches, covered with a layer of bark or woven mats. An example of a long house settlement is within Crawford Lake Conservation Area

On the Prairies the standard form of life was a nomadic one, with the people often moving to a new location each day to follow the bison herds. Housing thus had to be portable, and the tipi was developed. The tipi consisted of a thin wooden frame and an outer covering of animal hides. The structures could be quickly erected, and were light enough to transport long distances.

In the Interior of British Columbia the standard for of home was the semi-permanent pit house, thousands of relics of which, known as quiggly holes are scattered across the Interior landscape. These were structures shaped like an upturned bowl, placed on top of a 3-or-4-foot-deep (0.91 or 1.22 m) pit. The bowl, made of wood, would be covered with an insulating layer of earth. The house would be entered by climbing down a ladder at the centre of the roof.

Some of the most impressive First Nations architecture was that of the settled people of the west coast such as the Haida. These people used advanced carpentry and joinery skills to construct large houses of redcedar planks. These were large square, solidly built houses. The most advanced design was the six beam house, named for the number of beams that supported the roof. The front of each house would be decorated with a heraldric pole, the pole and sometimes the house would be brightly painted with artistic designs.

In the far north, where wood was scarce and solid shelter essential for survival, several innovative architectural styles were developed. One of the most famous is the igloo, a domed structure made of snow, which has highly insulative properties. In the summer months, when the igloos melted, tents made of seal skin, or other hides, were used. The Thule adopted a design similar to the pit houses of the BC interior, but because of the lack of wood they instead used whale bones for the frame.

=== Arrival of the Europeans ===
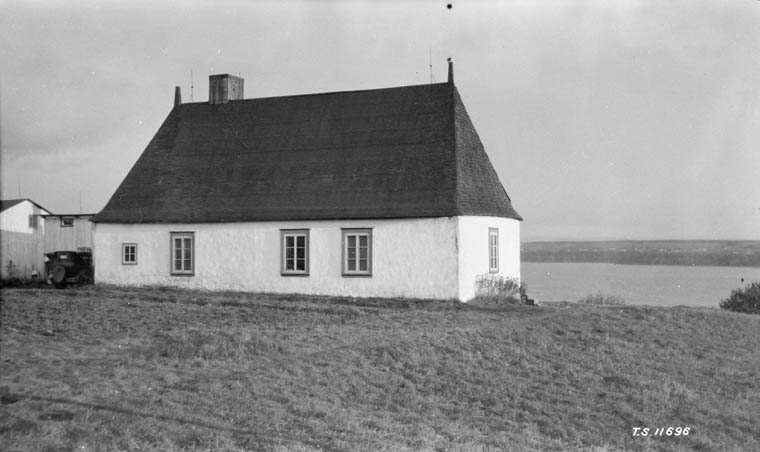
Maison de Julien Gendreau (1728), an archetypal example of a rural New France home, in Saint-Laurent, Île d'Orléans.

The first Europeans to inhabit what would become Canada were the French settlers of the New France settlements of Acadia and Canada. The initial settlements at Port Royal and Quebec City were mostly concerned with defence. Quebec City was divided into the Upper Town, which housed the fortress, Intendant's house, and churches made of stone in imitation of Baroque architecture, while the Lower Town consisted of densely packed structures on narrow streets. In Acadia, buildings were generally more functional, with wood framed walls filled with wattle and daub. This type of construction was common throughout both Acadia and New England in the 17th century.

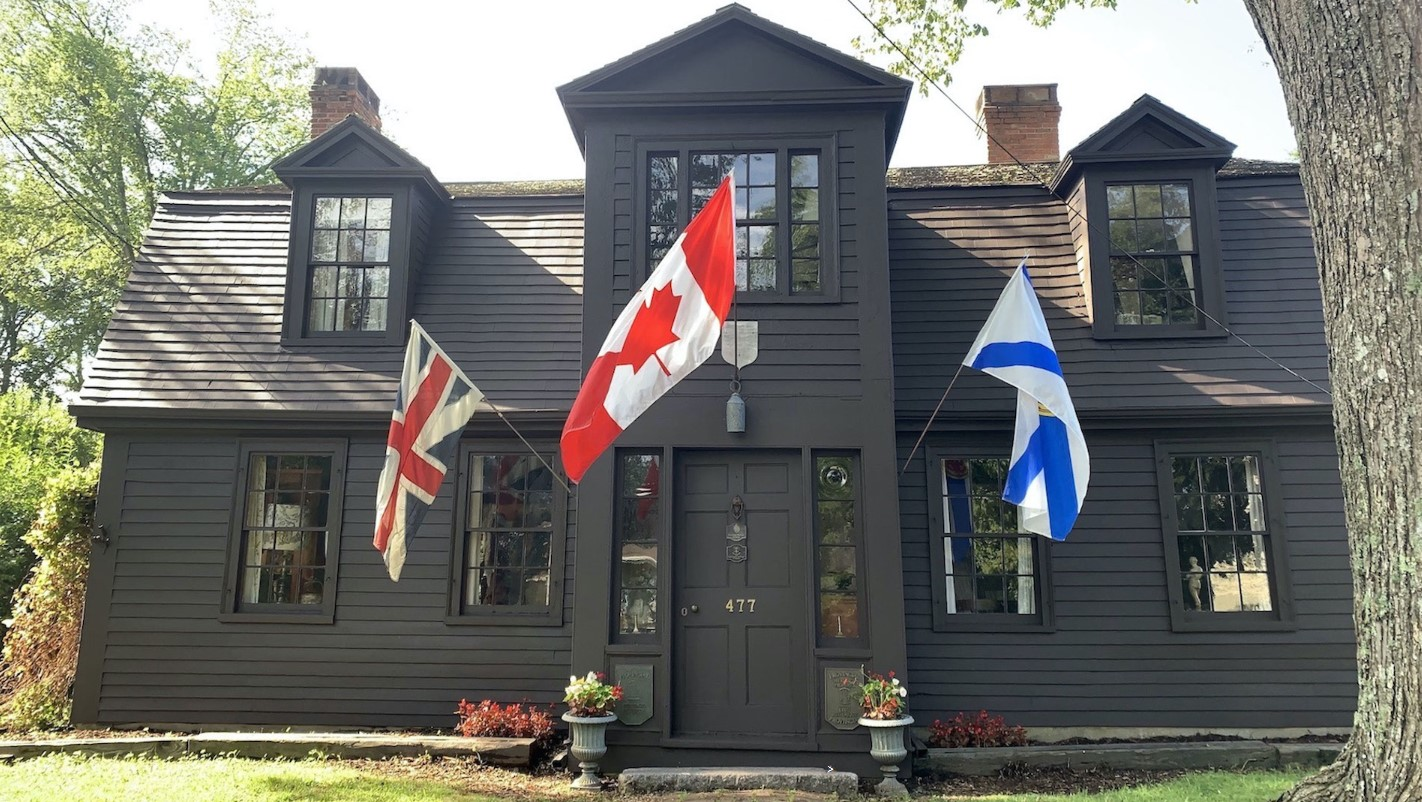
The de Gannes-Cosby house (1708) in Annapolis Royal, Nova Scotia, was constructed in the Acadian style

The settlers of the rural areas along the St. Lawrence largely came from Normandy, and the houses they built echoed their roots. The surroundings forced enough differences that a unique style developed, and the house of the New France farmer remains a symbol of French-Canadian nationalism. These were rectangular structures of one storey, but with an extremely tall and steep roof, sometimes almost twice as tall as the house below. This roof design perhaps developed to prevent the accumulation of snow. The houses were usually built of wood, though the surviving ones are almost all built of stone. Landmarks in the rural areas were the churches and the mansion of the seigneurs. The seigneurs built much larger homes for themselves, but rarely were the manors ornate. Each parish had its church, often smaller copies of major churches in Quebec City or Montreal. A unique style of French-Canadian church thus developed.

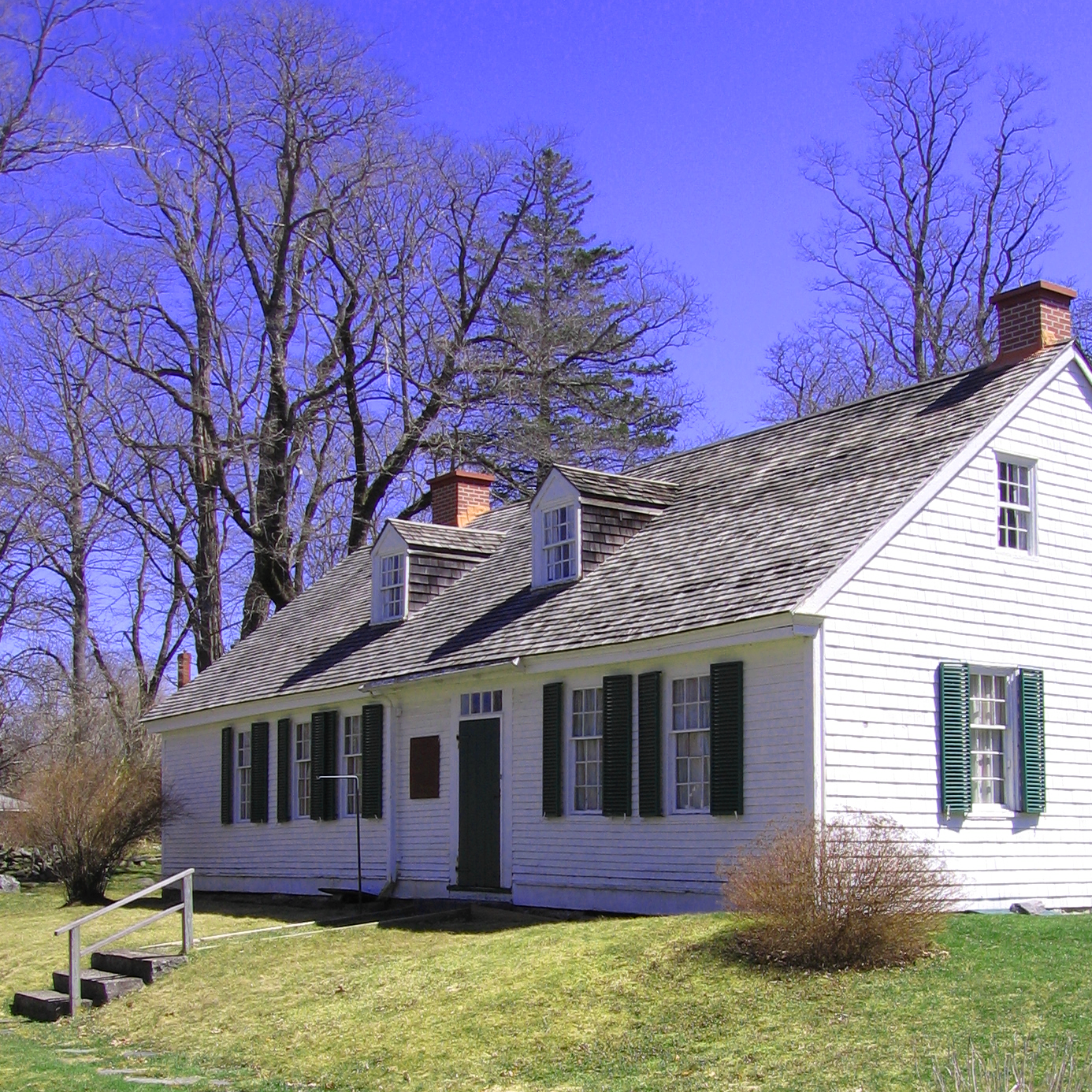
One of the earliest extant houses in Maritime Canada, Simeon Perkins' house was built on Nova Scotia's south shore in 1766.

The first English settlements in what would become Canada were in Newfoundland, growing out of the temporary fishing settlements that had been established in the sixteenth century. The first English settlement in the Maritimes was in Halifax, and then along the South Shore. The style that developed in the Maritimes was very close to the architecture of New England. Trade links between the two areas were close, and many of the settlers in the Maritimes were from there. Some of the first houses erected in Halifax were actually prefabricated structures assembled in Boston or New York and shipped to the new settlement. Cape Cod style cottages were built throughout the region. However, the influence of the Foreign Protestants was also felt as the architecture of the region also borrowed some techniques and styles from Germany and Switzerland, notably at Lunenburg. Even today, these influences can be seen in modern architecture on the Shobac Campus in Kingsburg, Nova Scotia.

=== Growth and expansion ===
The English speaking population of Canada grew dramatically with the influx of United Empire Loyalists after the American Revolution. This doubled the population of the Maritimes and brought the first significant European population to what was soon Upper Canada. One of the most popular styles in the pre-revolutionary United States was Georgian, after the revolution this style fell out of favour due to its association with the colonial regime, but the Loyalists embraced the style as an overt symbol of their loyalty. The style had also, however, fallen out of style in Britain, and Canada was alone in embracing Georgian architecture for much of the early nineteenth century.

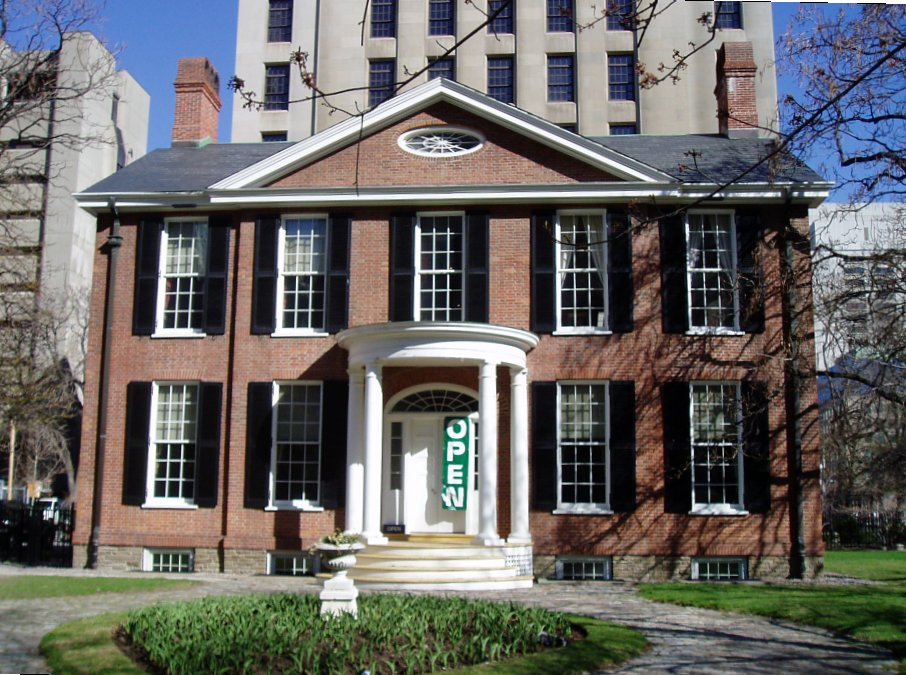
The Georgian style Campbell House in Toronto, built in 1822

In Lower Canada the Georgian style was employed by the English minority, but this minority dominated the commercial and political class. French-Canadian architecture kept many of its traditional forms, but also adopted some English styles. Throughout British North America the Georgian style was mostly used by the middle and upper classes, and also for institutional buildings such as churches and government structures. In rural areas, and among the urban poor, simpler styles dominated. In the Maritimes the New England style cottages continued to be popular. For the first settlers in Ontario the log cabin was the standard first house. Logs were a byproduct of the need the clear the land, and log cabins were cheap and easy to build. After a few years of farming it was typical to build a more elegant farmhouse. The most common design was the Ontario Style House, which consisted of a rectangular wood building with the main gable over the short sides, and a smaller gable over the main entrance.

The pattern of building in the west was very different. The first settlements in much of the West were the forts of the Hudson's Bay Company and North West Company and the cabins of the Metis. The next important presence was that of the Canadian Pacific Railway. The railway needed to build stations every 13 km of its 4200 km route in order to rewater the steam engines. Many of these stations became a nucleus of towns. These stations were built to standardized designs, with a number of different sizes for stations of differing importance. Other important monuments throughout the prairies were the grain elevators, and the banks which competed with each other by building ever more ornate structures.

While there is little wood native to the prairies, the railway enabled it to be imported at relatively low cost. It was still common to build a first temporary home out of sod. For those who were unsure of how to build a home, an industry of predesigned and prefabricated homes sold by catalogue developed. A settler could simply order plans for a few dollars, or also order the precut lumber, and premade doors and windows. The Eaton's catalogue of 1910 offered homes from a shack for $165 to a nine-room house for $1,025. These structures were erected across the prairies.

For some immigrants to the prairies, most notably the Ukrainians, there was not enough capital to buy a predesigned home, but since the immigrants were highly experienced with farming on the very similar Ukrainian steppe, houses identical to the peasant cottages of Eastern Europe were built across the prairies. These cottages had characteristic flared thatched roofs and white plaster walls. Even more notable were the onion domed Ukrainian churches built across the prairies. Other groups such as the Hutterites and Doukhobors also built unique structures. In the long run, however, the second and third generation immigrants tended to embrace the more British styles: the churches remained distinctly Eastern, but the houses largely conformed to the rest.

=== Victorian architecture ===
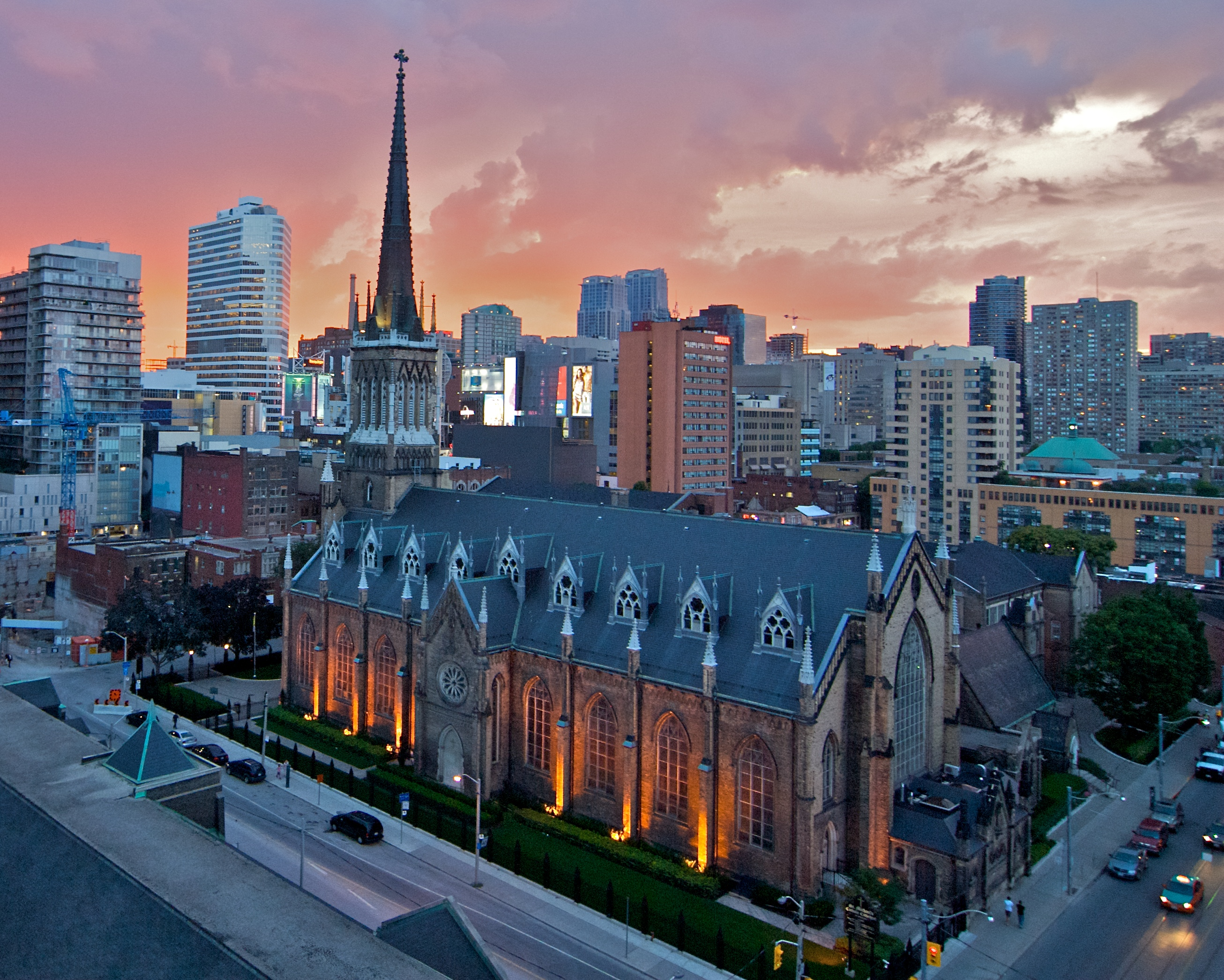
The Gothic Revival St. Michael's Cathedral in Toronto, built in 1845–1848

Victorian styles of architecture dominated in Canada from the mid-nineteenth century up to the First World War. Unlike during the previous centuries there was now easy communication between Canada and the architectural centres of the United States and Britain. It was common for Canadian architects to travel, study, and work in these other areas, and it was also increasingly common to hire foreign architects. This meant that ideas and styles developed elsewhere were quickly adopted in Canada. These were diverse styles, but one common element were attempts to revive ideas of the past. The first such style to come to prominence was the Gothic Revival style, which first came to Canada in the 1830s. This became the dominant architectural style for churches, especially Anglican and Roman Catholic ones, which both embraced Gothic Revival as evidence of their conservatism. It also was used for scholastic structures, such as universities and some houses. The bay-and-gable was a housing form that emerged in 19th century Toronto, that incorporated Gothic Revival elements throughout its front façade. Some of the most prominent Gothic Revival structures are the original Parliament Buildings in Ottawa, by noted architect Thomas Fuller who in 1881 was appointed Chief Dominion Architect. The Chief Dominion Architect(s) designed a number of prominent public buildings in Canada including post offices, armouries and drill halls: Thomas Seaton Scott (1871–1881); Thomas Fuller (1880–1897); David Ewart (1897–1914); Edgar L Worwood (1914–1918); Richard Cotsman Wright (1918–1927); Thomas W. Fuller (1927–1936), Charles D. Sutherland (1936–1947); and Joseph Charles Gustave Brault (1947–1952)

Other revived styles also became prominent. Romanesque Revival buildings such as the British Columbia Legislature, Old Toronto City Hall, and Langevin Block were erected in this period. Several landmark Second Empire Style structures erected include the National Assembly of Quebec, Montreal City Hall, and the Legislative Assembly of New Brunswick. In the 1890s Queen Anne Style architecture became the dominant one for upper and middle-class houses across Canada. Early in the twentieth style the Tudor Style became quite popular, especially on the West Coast. Neoclassicism and Beaux-Arts architecture became the dominant style for banks and government buildings, with the latter style being frequently used from the turn of the twentieth century to the 1930s for monumental public buildings such as Toronto's Union Station by John M. Lyle and structures like the massive Princes' Gates at Exhibition Place in Toronto.

=== Canadian styles ===
In the period after the First World War, Canadian nationalism led to attempts to proclaim a unique Canadian architecture, distinct from that of Britain and the United States. One style promoted as distinctly Canadian was the Château Style, also known as Railway Gothic. This style first appeared in the late nineteenth century with grandiose railway hotels such as the Château Frontenac and Banff Springs Hotel. It was a mix of Victorian Gothic Revival with castles of the Loire Valley in France. The railways were seen as symbols of Canada, and the mix of French and English ideas was also considered distinctly Canadian. During the Interwar years the Château style was used in several prominent public structures, such as the Supreme Court building. Prime Minister William Lyon Mackenzie King was a prominent supporter of the style. The third and current Hotel Vancouver, the last of the great Gothic railway hotels, was also completed after the start of the Second World War, though it had been under construction until 1929 (its predecessor was Italian Renaissance, a common style in late Victorian and Edwardian British Columbia).

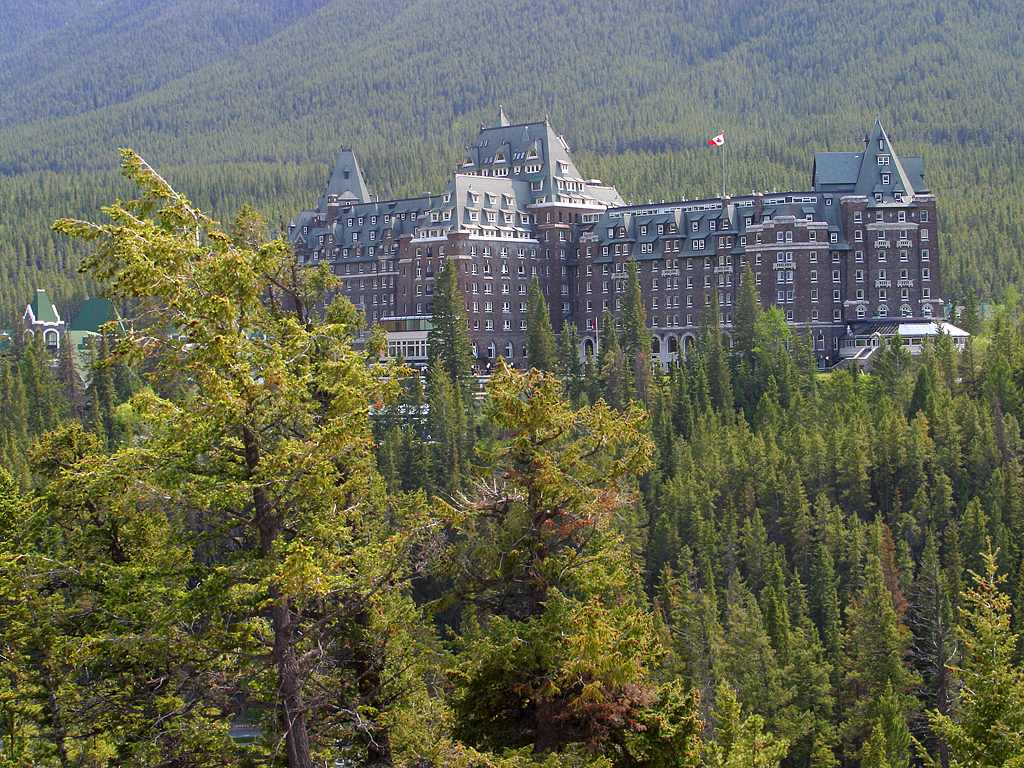
The "Chateaux-style" Banff Springs Hotel in Alberta

The desire for a unique Canadian style also led to a revival of the Neo-Gothic style during the interwar period. In part because of the prominence of the Parliament Buildings in Ottawa and the CPR's "railway Gothic", Gothic architecture had become closely associated with Canada and while the United States embraced Art Deco Canadian architects returned to the Middle Ages for inspiration, by way of John Ruskin's writings on Neo-Gothic, the most Victorian of all styles. When the Centre Block of the Parliament Buildings burnt down in 1916 it was rebuilt in a similar Gothic style to that that had been used fifty years earlier. At the same time, Modernism inspired the Gothic style employed, and the Neo-Gothic buildings of the era often saw more sparse ornamentation and incorporated steel frames in their construction.

=== Modernist period ===
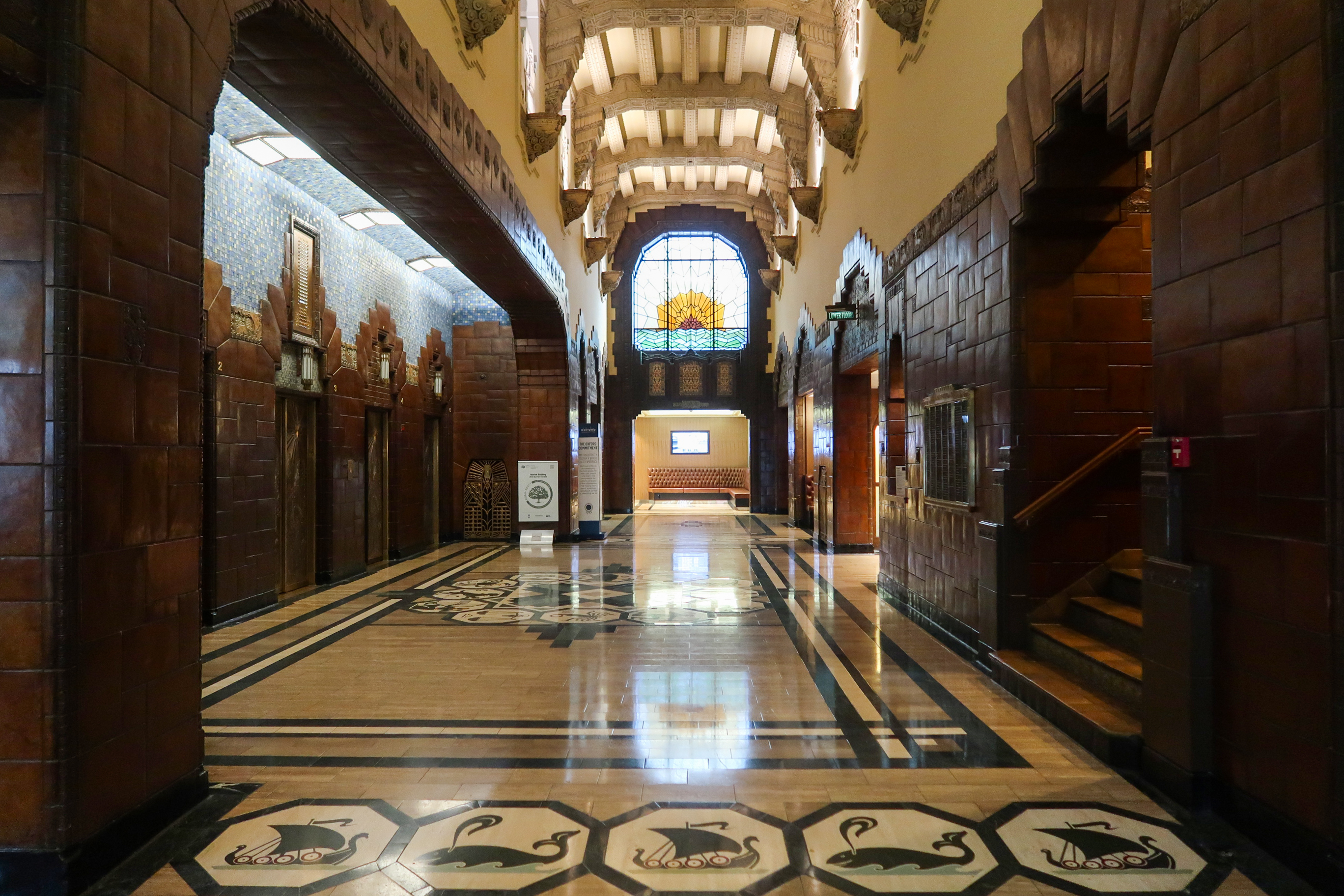
Marine Building lobby (Vancouver), 2018

At the same time developments, especially those in the United States, were not ignored. Toronto closely followed Chicago and New York as the home of skyscrapers employing new steel framed construction and elevators. In the latter half of the twentieth century, Toronto's influence on other Canadian cities, largely because of the control of capital (especially banks) meant that Western Canadian cities, particularly Vancouver, became filled with lesser versions of their counterparts in Toronto (e.g. TD Tower (Vancouver), Bentall Centre (Vancouver)) which displaced the city's older and distinctly Edwardian flavor.

Modernism appeared in a number of guises. In the 1920s and 1930s the banks and insurance companies embraced Modern Classicism. The Prairie Style, well suited to the Canadian terrain, became a popular one for homes and other structures, especially the designs of Francis Sullivan. In British Columbia, the bungalow style popular in British India became a fixture in local house design, and styles such as Arts and Crafts, Queen Anne and emulations of Californian Spanish and other distinctly western North America styles were common.

In Vancouver during the 1950s and 1960s, Modernist architectures inspired by Frank Lloyd Wright and fostered by the unique building materials and physical setting resulted in various daring new styles of housing, particularly on Vancouver's ritzy North Shore, featuring open beams, glass walls, and innovative floor plans. Vancouver architect Arthur Erickson, more known for grandiose exercises in institutional concrete such as Robson Square and Simon Fraser University, pioneered the British Columbia version of the "West Coast style", variations of which are also common in Washington, Oregon and California. Erickson-designed houses are prized for their intimacy and taste, as well as their advantageous use of natural settings. A lesser, though much more common, form of Modernist architecture developed during the 1960s was the Vancouver Special, a two-story stuccoed box which took up most of a city lot, and typically featured two suites, one upstairs and one downstairs.

The movements and styles popular in the United States and Britain were not totally ignored in Canada. Several landmark Art Deco structures were erected, such as the Vancouver City Hall and the Marine Building also in that city and Commerce Court North in Toronto. The Georgian revival that was underway in the United States also made some incursions to Canada, as did diverse styles such as Egyptian Revival and Spanish Colonial styles.

=== International style ===
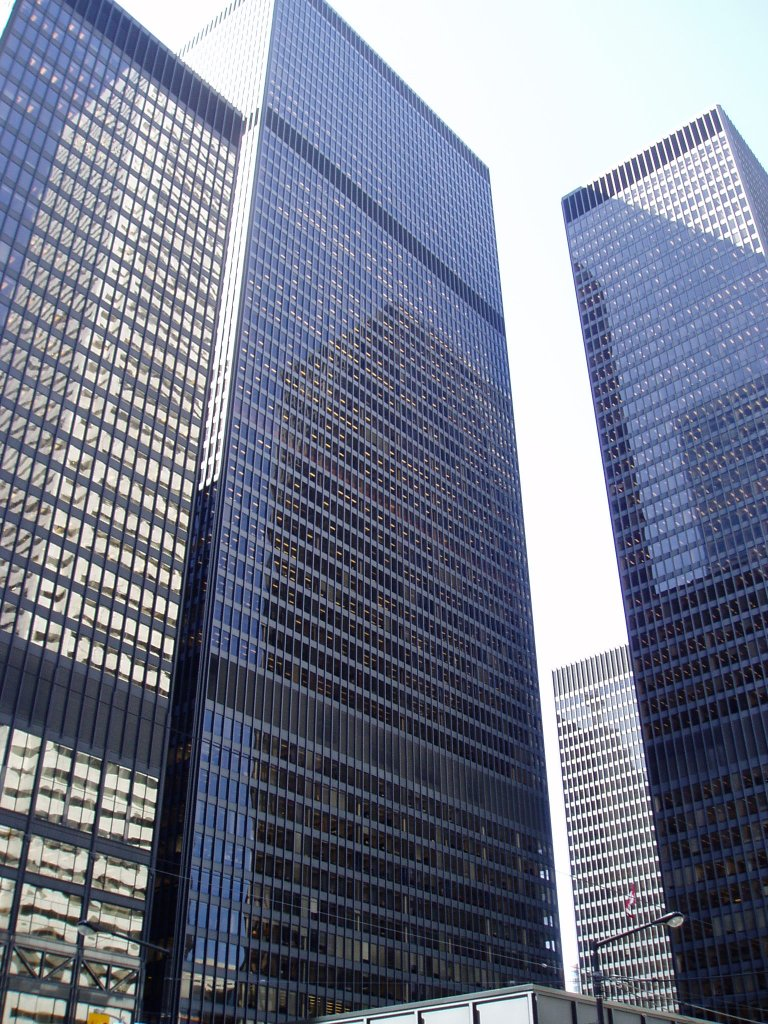
Ludwig Mies van der Rohe's Toronto-Dominion Centre

After the Second World War, the desire for unique Canadian styles faded as the International Style came to dominate the Canadian scene in the 1950s through 1970s. Many of the most prominent Canadian projects of this period were designed by foreigners, who won open contests. Prominent Modernists such as Ludwig Mies van der Rohe and I.M. Pei designed major works in Canada. At the same time top Canadian architects did much of their work abroad. One of the first and most prominent Modernist structures was Ludwig Mies van der Rohe's Toronto-Dominion Centre. The T-D Centre was one of the most prominent of the early glass and steel panelled office towers, which would be imitated around the world. The International Style period coincided with a major building boom in Canada, and few restrictions on massive building projects. International Style skyscrapers came to dominate many of Canada's major cities, especially Vancouver, Calgary, Edmonton, Ottawa, and Toronto. In Montreal fewer such buildings were erected, but those that were such as Place Ville-Marie and Place Victoria, were large enough to dominate the skyline.

The first phase of the Toronto subway was completed 1954 as the first subway line in Canada, with sleek but austere and repetitive station architecture, influenced by the International Style. Yet the opening of the Montreal Metro opened in 1966 proved to be more architecturally significant in Canada because its individual stations each contained unique Modernist architecture with expressive uses of colour, form, and materials by different architects and incorporated works of art to enhance the experience of using the system. This influenced Toronto to take a similar course with its Spadina line by 1978, commissioning Arthur Erickson and several Canadian firms and artists. Montreal continued upon its legacy of unique station architecture in expanding its system. Vancouver's Skytrain rapid transit system relied on modern minimalist designs from its beginning in 1985, with some design variation and artwork in terms of the stations in the system which have been added since its opening.

The Modernist styles had mixed results when applied to residential structures, such as the large housing projects constructed in this era. Massive Canadian housing projects, such as St. James Town, were more successful than their counterparts in the United States. The postwar period saw the rise of massive and low density suburbs surrounding most Canadian cities, with Don Mills being Canada's first community constructed on rigidly Modernist lines. One important development was the rise of shopping malls that became the commercial, and often social, centres of these suburban areas. The West Edmonton Mall was the world's largest mall for a 23-year period from 1981 until 2004.

While the glass towers of the International Style skyscraper were at first unique and interesting, the idea was soon repeated to the point of ubiquity. Architects attempted to put new twists into such towers, such as the Toronto City Hall. By the 1970s an international backlash was underway against Modernism, and Canada was one of its centres. Prominent critics of Modern planning such as Jane Jacobs and George Baird were based in Canada.

=== Late and postmodernism ===
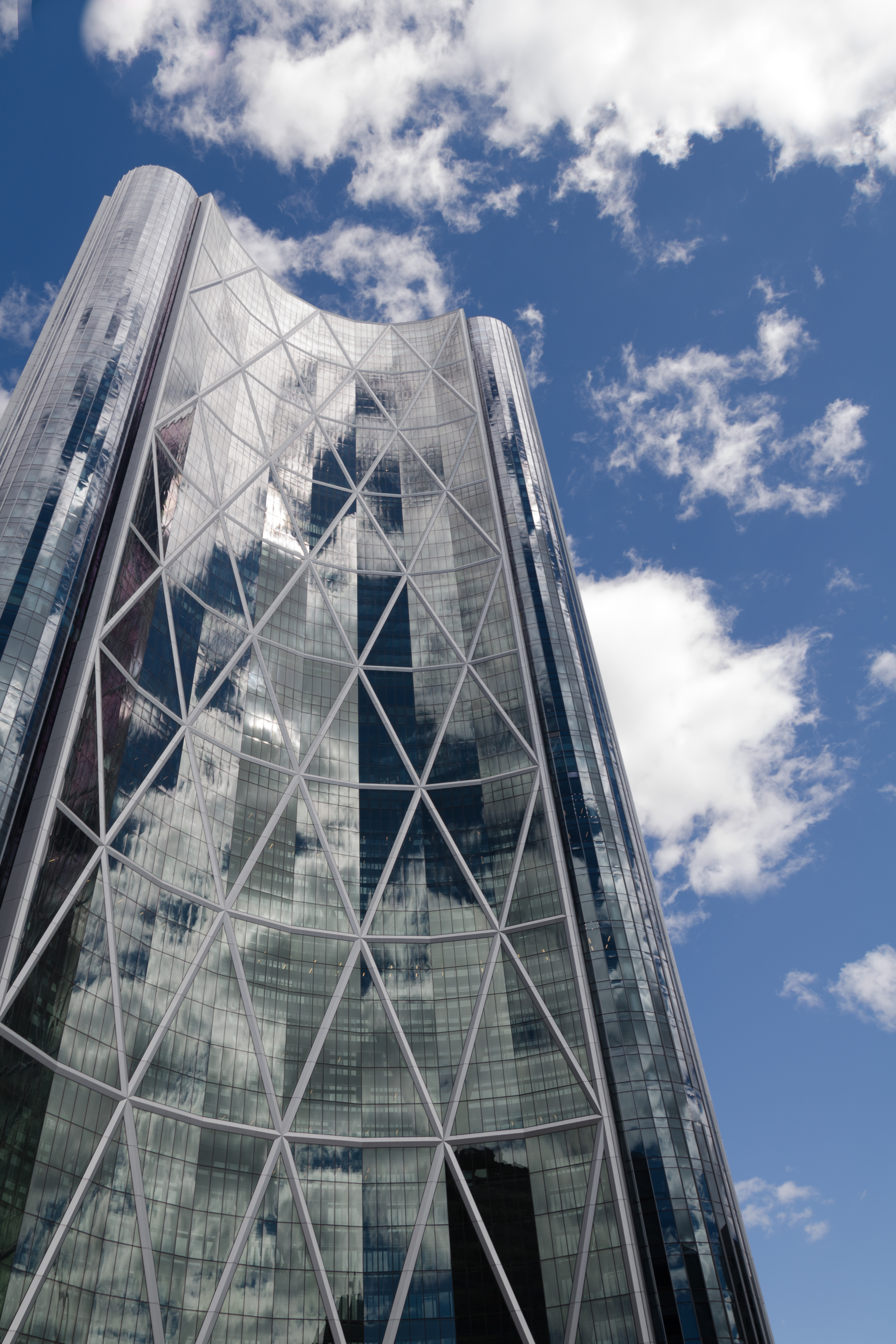
The Bow

The 1970s represented a turning point away from the International Style and Modernist planning. Brutalist architecture had been seen in Canada prior to the decade, but became more dominant in the 1970s with the backlash against the International Style. The style emphasized the reflection of the functional components of the interior in the exterior, along with geometric and sculptural uses of concrete on the interior and exterior of the building. It was a style used focally for institutional buildings for government, academic, and cultural uses, but also for high-rise residential and commercial buildings. At the same time, urban activists, architects and governments increasingly moved to influence development in favour of heritage preservation, historic view, corridor preservation, and contextual sensitivity in scale and materials.

The new Canadian architecture once again turned to the past. A prominent heritage preservation movement developed, and most cities today have heritage districts of restored structures. Old factories and warehouses, rather than be demolished, have been refurbished, such as the Queen's Quay Terminal, a former warehouse at a prominent central location on the Toronto waterfront that was rebuilt into a mix of stores, residential condominiums, and a theatre. New buildings have also begun to echo the past. Ronald Thom's Massey College is a notable early example completed in 1963. It adds strong Gothic influences to a Modern concrete, brick, and glass aesthetic. The CAMH Research Centre by KPMB Architects, proposed to be completed by 2027, echoes the past of Queen Street West and Shaw Street, revitalizing the site that was originally known as the Provincial Lunatic Asylum from the mid-19th century until 1976.

Postmodern architecture was the mainstream style in Canada by the 1980s. Postmodernity in architecture is generally thought to be heralded by the return of "wit, ornament and reference" to architecture in response to the formalism of the International Style of Modernism and perceived problems with the style. The functional and formalized shapes and spaces of the Modernist movement were replaced by unapologetically diverse aesthetics: styles collide, form is adopted for its own sake, and new ways of viewing familiar styles and space abound. Architects produced what they perceived to be more meaningful buildings with pluralism, double coding, flying buttresses and high ceilings, irony and paradox, and contextualism. Skyscrapers like 1000 de La Gauchetière in Montreal, Brookfield Place in Toronto, and Bankers Hall in Calgary define the style in terms of high-rise corporate architecture. These towers feature combinations of International Style design features with ornamental and potentially symbolic references to past architectural styles such as Art Deco, with pronounced base, middle, and top sections, and prominent atrium common spaces.

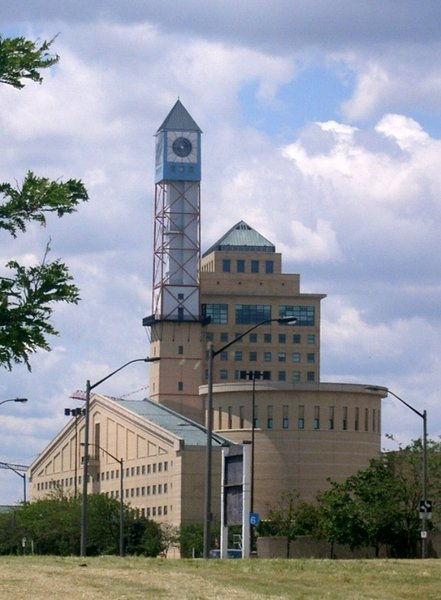
Mississauga City Hall

The Mississauga Civic Centre, completed in 1987, is an important example of public architecture in the style. It makes reference to local farm architecture around the suburban area of Mississauga as well as a clocktower—a feature associated with traditional city centres. It exhibits references to past architectural ideas, yet is decidedly untraditional. The Vancouver Public Library similarly evokes Postmodern aesthetic ideals, though references a different architectural past, demonstrating the eclectic nature of the style in Canada.

The Embassy of Canada, Tokyo, completed in 1991, and designed by Raymond Moriyama, is an example of government architecture located outside of Canada.

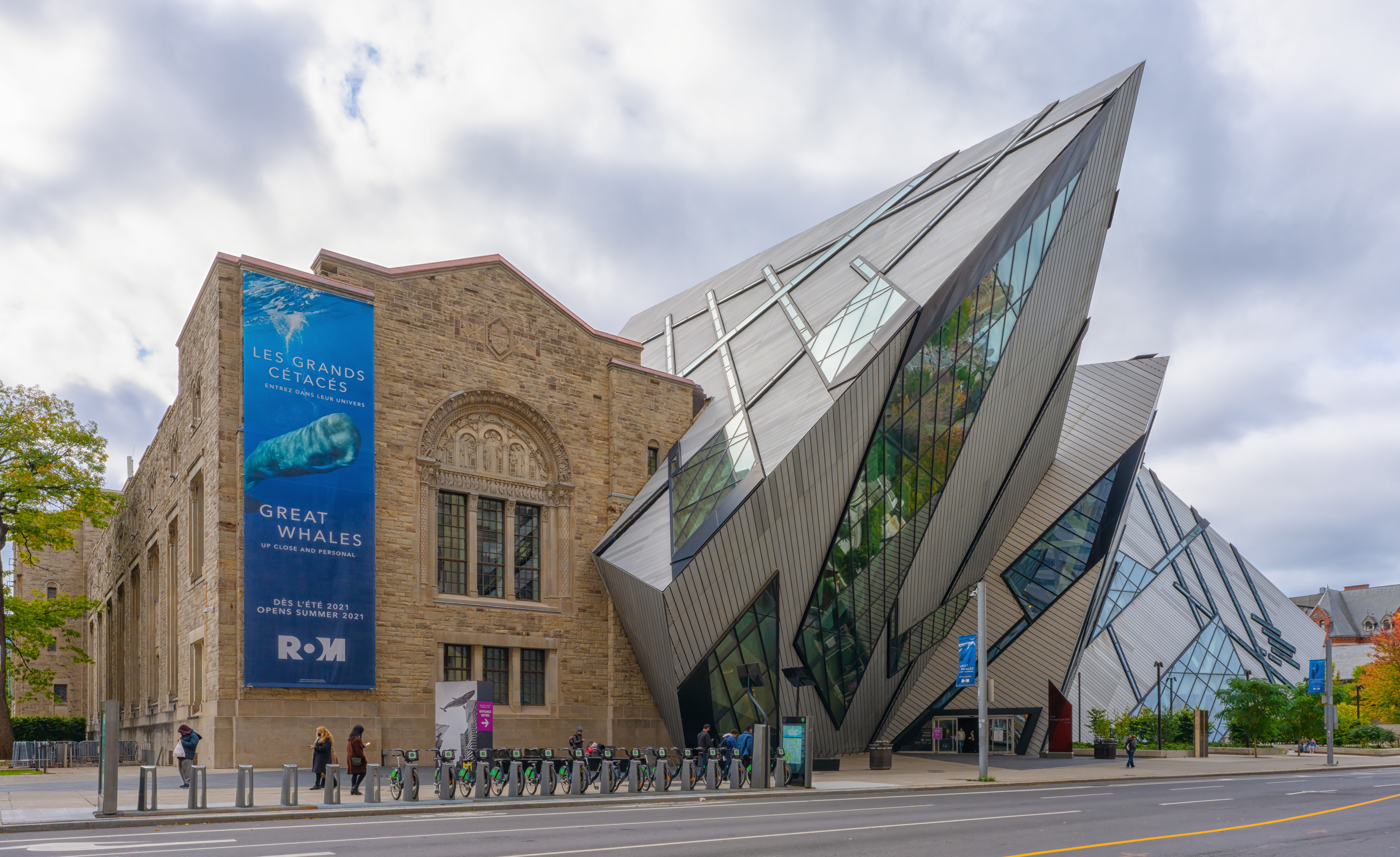
The Royal Ontario Museum, with its 2007 "Crystal" addition

Postmodernism visibly declined by the 2000s, when architecture in Canada became more varied. Lowrise residential subdivision architecture became more strongly focused on imitating traditional styles from the likes of the Georgian and Victorian eras, though low-rise infill projects in cities demonstrated an increased popularity of the Modern aesthetic. High-rise architecture generally turned to new variations on the International Style. Starchitects received commissions to design a small number of prominent urban landmarks. For instance, Norman Foster designed The Bow in Calgary, while Toronto saw the completion of the Deconstructivist Michael Lee-Chin "Crystal" at the Royal Ontario Museum by Daniel Libeskind, and the thorough renovation and expansion project by Frank Gehry of the Art Gallery of Ontario.

== See also ==
- List of prominent Canadian architects
- Society of Architectural Historians
- Examination for Architects in Canada
- Gothic Revival architecture in Canada
- List of armouries in Canada
- List of tallest buildings in Canada
- List of tallest structures in Canada
- List of old Canadian buildings
- Pedimental sculptures in Canada
- List of heritage buildings in Vancouver
- List of oldest buildings and structures in Toronto
- Architecture of Toronto
- Architecture of Montreal
- Architecture of Ottawa
- Architecture of Quebec City
- Architecture of St. John's
- Architecture of Vancouver
- Canadian Centre for Architecture
- Ontario Cottage
