= Dominion Public Building (London, Ontario) =

Canadian government offices

Coordinates: 42°59′06″N 81°15′04″W

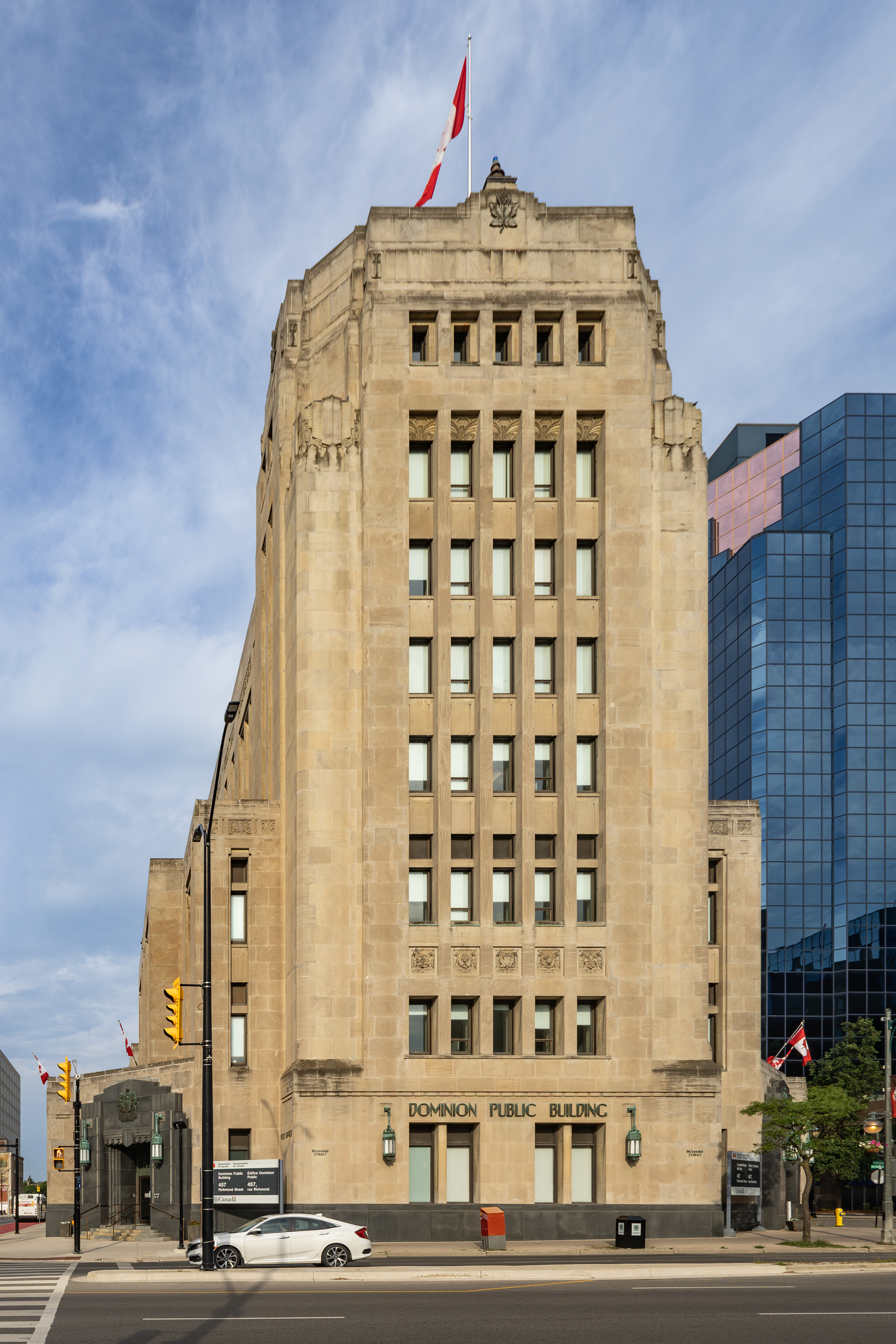
- Dominion Public Building, 2026
- Interactive map of Dominion Public Building
- Location: 457 Richmond St, London, Ontario, N6A 3E3

History
- Built: 1935-1936

Site notes
- Architectural style: Art Deco

National Historic Site of Canada
- Designated: 1990

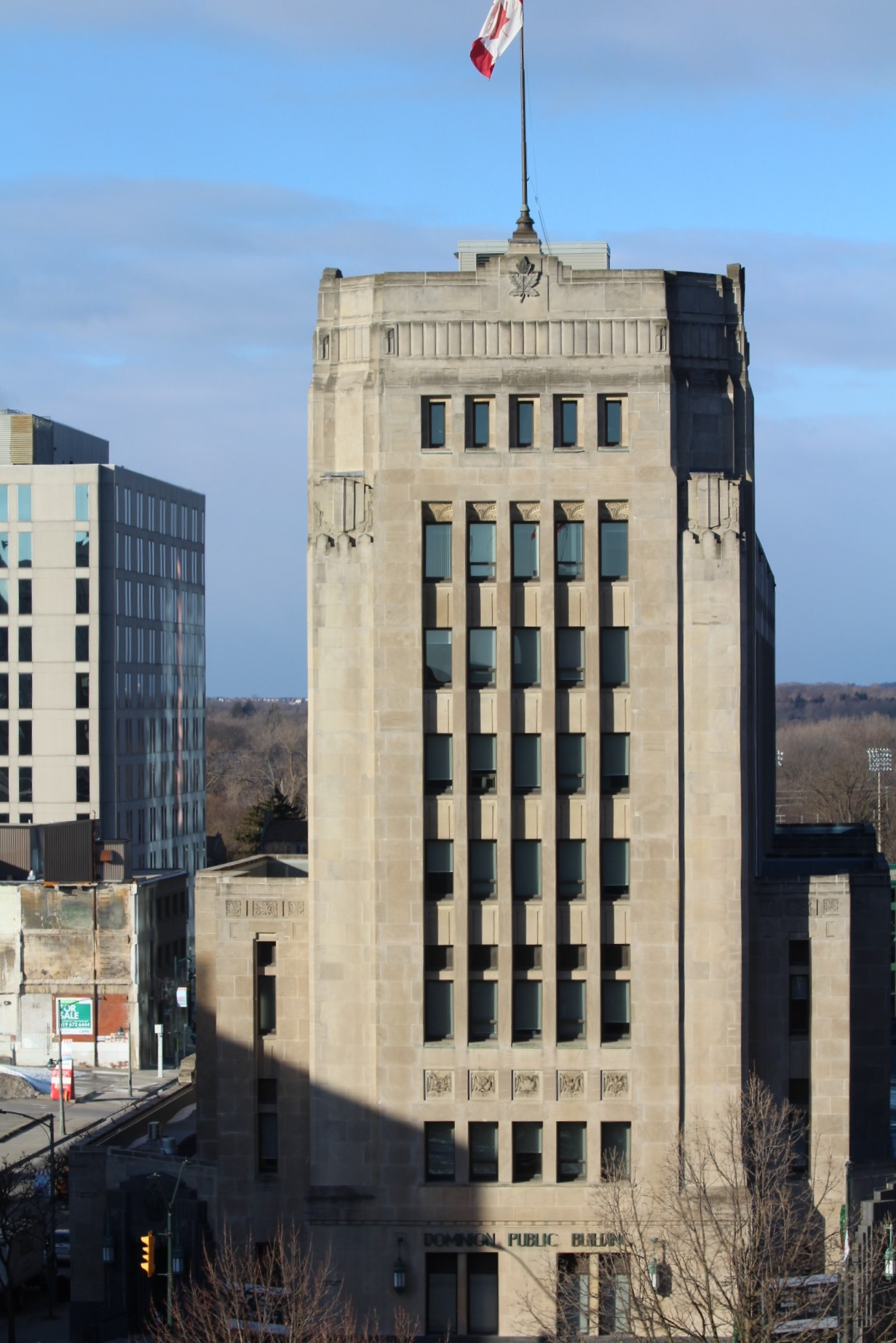
Front view of The Dominion Public Building

The Dominion Public Building is an Art Deco office building located on Richmond Street in the heart of London, Ontario, Canada. Construction on the building started in 1935 and concluded with the building's inauguration in September 1936. The Dominion Public Building was a result of the Public Works Construction Act of 1934, which laid out a plan to reinvigorate Canada's economy through public works projects. The building was designed by Chief Public Works Architect Thomas W. Fuller with the help of three London architects: John MacLeod Watt, Victor Joseph Blackwell and Roy O. Moore. The building displays a physical essay of "the New Classicalism," or "Modern Classicalism"; this architectural approach is a take on the Art Deco style of architecture and is what highlights this building as a piece of Canadian Heritage.

The Dominion Public Building was mainly known for its use by the Postal Service, but the building also hosted other government departments such as Customs, The Department of Labour, Pensions, Health, and others. Currently the building is still under government ownership and is now a Classified Federal Heritage Building.

== The Public Works Construction Act ==
The Public Works Construction Act was enacted on July 3, 1934, and was designed to rebuild Canada and pull the nation out of the economic struggles of the Great Depression and return Canada to a state of economic normalcy. From the act itself: "An Act to provide for the construction and improvement of certain public works and undertakings throughout Canada"; this act aspires to create work for the nation to return Canada to economic normalcy. This act laid out a total of 185 project locations across Canada totaling around $39.69 million in funding; which was distributed per project, per city. This funding ranged anywhere from a few thousand dollars to $2.5 million for bigger projects in bigger cities. Many of these projects were Dominion Public Buildings for other cities; one example of such a situation would be the Dominion Public Building in Toronto, Ont. or the Dominion Public Building in Halifax, NS.

=== Implementation in London, Ont. ===
The City of London received $1.5 million for a brand-new public building, which eventually became The Dominion Public Building. London, like any other city during "the hungry thirties" was suffering economically with a huge unemployment crisis in progress. The Public Works Construction Act came as a relief to many Londoners during this time, with many of them taking up work to construct The Dominion Public Building.

== Architects ==
The architects of the Dominion Public Building were headed by Thomas W. Fuller, who was in charge of all Public works construction for the Act. For London, Thomas worked with London architects John Watt, Victor Blackwell and Roy Moore to design The Dominion Public Building.

Thomas W. Fuller was a Canadian architect who practiced across Canada designing various federal buildings. In 1927 he was appointed to the role of Chief Dominion Architect; the same role in which his father, Thomas Fuller, was involved with. Thomas W. Fuller was Chief Dominion Architect for a total of 10 years, and exited the role in 1936. During his time as Dominion Architect he oversaw many Public Works Construction Act projects and brought neoclassicism to Canadian federal buildings.

John Watt and Roy Moore were both local architects who worked with W. Fuller on The Dominion Public Building. They had both been working in the London area and had established practices in the city. At the time of the design and construction of The Dominion Public Building, John Watt partnered with Victor Blackwell at their firm Watt and Blackwell, which became one of the leading firms in the city. Roy Moore, one of the other architects for the project was also involved with another leading architecture firm in London. Roy worked at and then became partner at his father's firm, eventually changing the name from Moore & Henry to J.M. Moore & co.

== Architecture ==
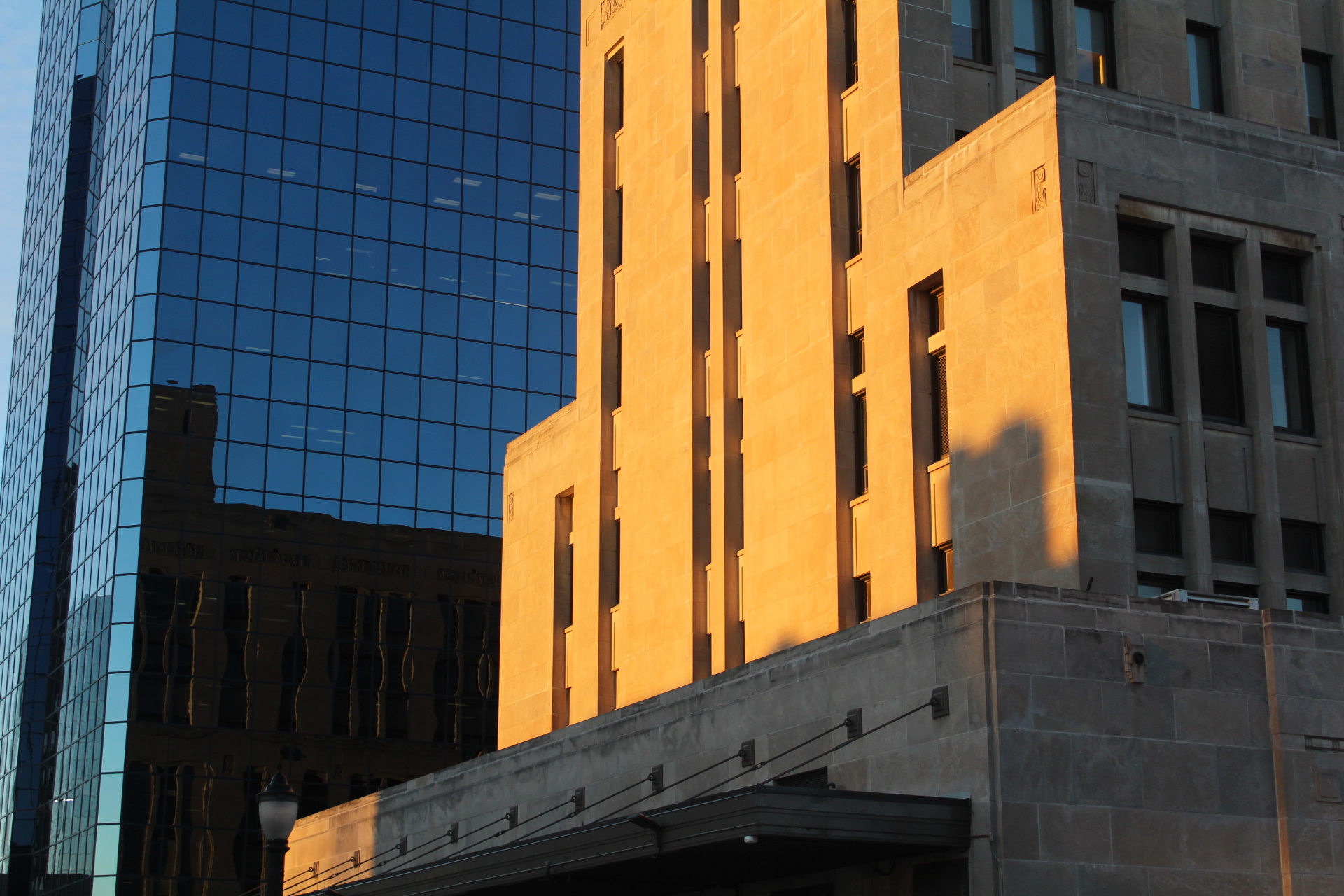
A view at the solid massing of The Dominion Public Building on the rear facade

The London Dominion Public Building, along with many other federal buildings from the Public Works Act, followed the formal language of neoclassicism. The architects of the building followed an offshoot of the neoclassical period called Classical Moderne; this resulted in the sleek, conservative and solid massing of the building. Alongside its overall formal language, Fuller incorporated many art deco elements to the building that complimented the smooth exterior shell. The Dominion Public Building commands a strong, yet dignified presence through its neoclassical massing style; the building follows the traditional format of base, shaft and capital that defines the overall form of the architecture. This specific massing was developed to sympathise with the everyday circulation on the street below; from the street level the building appears as a one-storey construction, but as the viewer steps back the massing of the building steps as well, revealing a vertical prominence.

=== Materials and construction ===
The construction of the Dominion Building was primarily concrete block with a limestone finish, polished black granite served as an accent throughout the building, often denoting entrances and other elements of architectural significance. Aluminum was also heavily used in the construction of the building, primarily as a trim for windows and doors. The building served as an advertisement for the use of this new modern material, using around 5,000 lbs of aluminum in construction.

The interior featured polished marble walls and terrazzo floors, bringing an art deco atmosphere to the interior aesthetic. Both on the interior and exterior, bronze and brass were used for lettering, door handles and other minor trim details; these details would pop and shine in the light giving a richness to the spaces. However most of these brass and bronze details did not survive, with most being replaced in 1983 when the building was renovated.

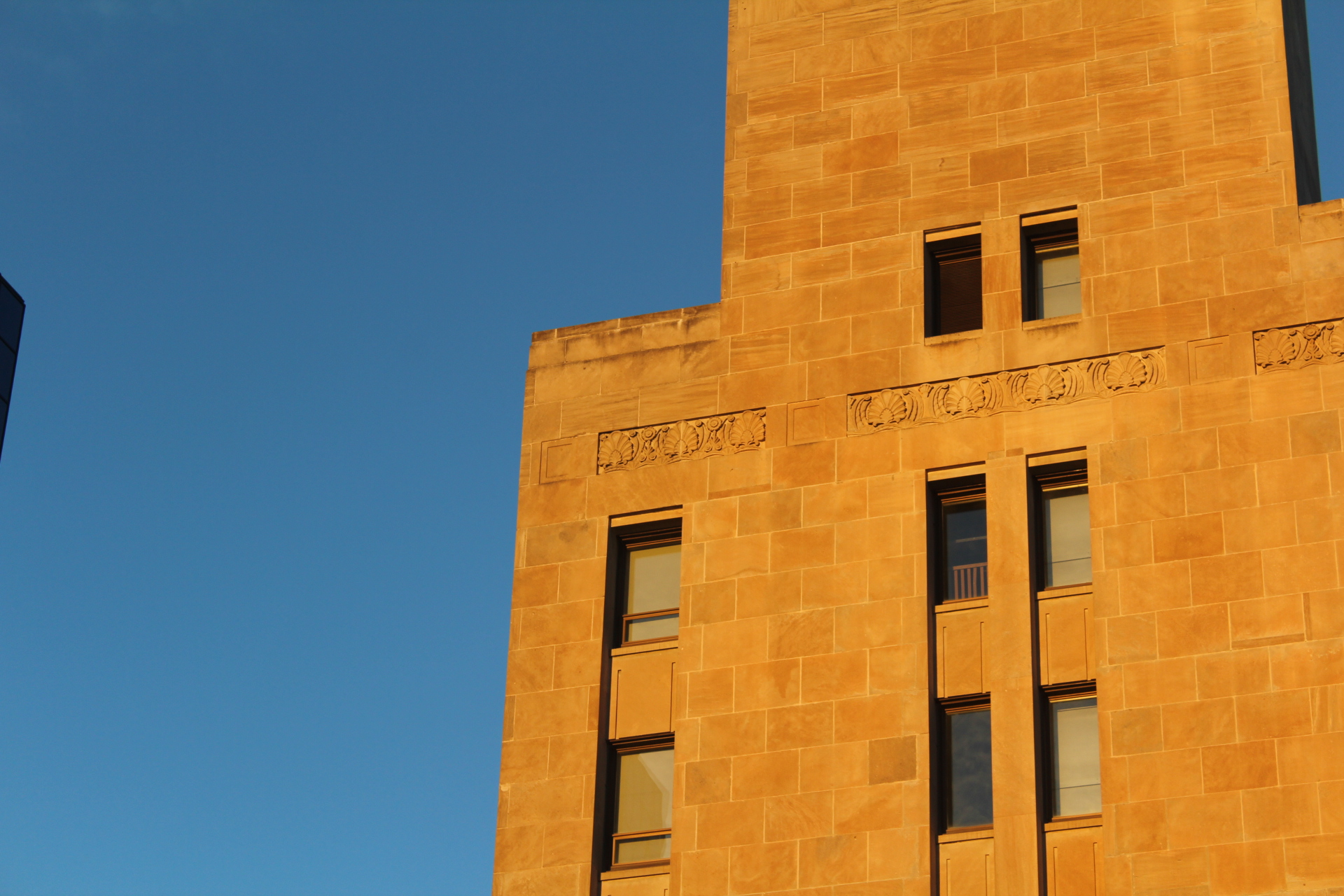
Art Deco carvings on the back of The Dominion Public Building

=== Iconography and other art deco elements ===
An important part of the overall aesthetic of the Dominion Public Building was the many carvings, iconography and intricate details that were worked into the design. These various intricacies were often nationalist in order, usually portraying the maple leaf, or a coat of arms. This was significant for this time because these federal buildings were built to show that Canada was not down and out, even though the economy was in ruins.

The art deco elements of the Dominion Public Building were distributed throughout the whole building, incorporated into the exterior as well as the interior. Art Deco influence is seen in the signage, elevator ornamentation, carvings and bronze trim.

== Construction ==
Construction played a big role in the Public Works Act rollout and was a supply of jobs in a drought of unemployment. The construction of the Dominion Public Building came as a relief to many London workers who worked tirelessly from April 1935 to January 1936 to complete the public building. The building started with pile foundations and reinforced concrete formed the foundations of the building. It was then built up using a steel and concrete post and beam system. Then the exterior shell of concrete block was put on to finish the monolithic mass.

== Current State ==
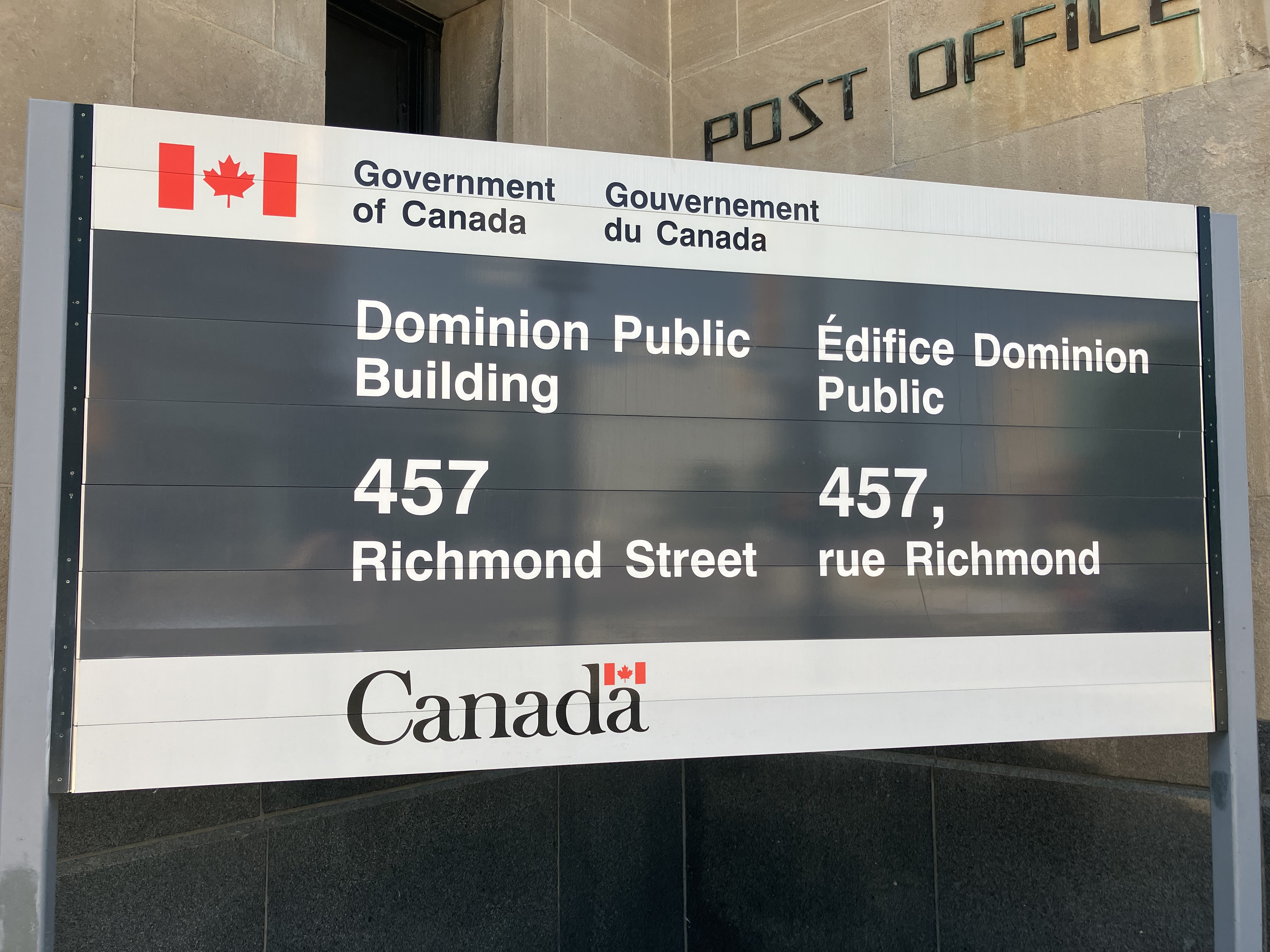

The government of Canada owns the building and uses it for federal services. From its original state, the building has remained largely the same, as per its Federal Heritage classification. There have been some minor modifications to the building for both aesthetic reasons and accessibility reasons. Over the years, the bronze that was used as an accent has worn away on the door handles and the lights, thus they have been replaced with aesthetically similar stand-ins. The Heritage classification states directly that changes to the dominant massing of the building should be avoided at all costs, due to its architectural significance and relevance to the building's core concept.

== Classified Federal Heritage Building ==
In June 1990, the London Dominion Public Building received designation as a federal heritage building. This designation was based on its historical value in addition to its historical architectural style.

Historically, this building represents a turning point in Great Depression economics and stood as a sign of hope and reassurance for the Canadian people. As a heritage building it serves as a reminder to the population of the struggles of the 1930s and shows them that the government had their backs with the Public Works Construction Act.

Architecturally this building is an example of the neoclassical architectural movement, and at face value stands as a representation of the classical modern offshoot of the movement. The building also represents an era of quality materials, construction and art in the craft of architecture and design.
