= Edwin Gardner =

Edwin Gardner may refer to:

- Edwin M. Gardner (1845–1935), American Confederate veteran and painter
- Edwin Alexander Gardner (1902–1986), Canadian architect
