= Kingsland + Architects =

Toronto architectural firm

Kingsland + Architects Inc. is a Toronto based architectural firm formed by James Henry Craig (1888–1954) and Henry Harrison Madill (1889–1988).

The firms work was founded in 1910 as Craig and Madill Architects that spanned from 1910 to mid 1950s with all located in Toronto, but both architects built buildings on their own during that time. The firm's work stopped from 1915 to 1918 when both served overseas during World War I and ended in 1954 with the death of Craig. From 1956, it became known as by the names of Craig, Madill, Abram and Ingleson Architects, Abram and Ingleson Architects, Abram, Nowski and McLaughlin Architects & Planners, Abram/Nowski, Architects and Planners, Nowski Partners Architects, and Nowski & Kingsland Partners Architects Inc. before adopting its present name in 2001.

== History ==
=== James Henry Craig ===
Craig was a fellow architecture student with Madill at the University of Toronto and worked his entire career with Madill after 1912, but had independent commissions from 1920s to 1950s with most outside of Toronto (exception was the Dominion Public Building which Craig worked with Thomas W. Fuller). He married Grace MacFarlane Morris in 1923.

=== Henry Harrison Madill ===
Madill was born in Beaverton, Ontario, but later moved to Toronto where he graduated from Jarvis Collegiate and enrolled in architecture at the University of Toronto, where he met Craig. With Craig he served with the Canadian Army from 1915 to 1918, but returned to practice after the war. Madill worked at the School of architecture at the University of Toronto from 1920 to 1975 (Dean from 1948 to 1957 and Director Emeritus in 1975). Madill's academic work prevailed over his design work after Craig's death.

== Selected works ==
- Varsity Stadium 1929-1930 was demolished in 2002 and new stadium rebuilt
- The Palace Pier 1930 and destroyed by fire in 1963
- Earl Haig High School 1929-1930 and 1947 additions demolished in 1996 and replaced with current building
- Willowdale United Church 1932 was demolished and replaced in 1954
- CNE Bandshell 1936
- 330 Keele Street 1935-1936 - built as Dominion Public Building (not to be confused with Dominion Public Building which Craig worked on as well) and now used by Correction Services of Canada
- Agincourt Collegiate Institute 1957, eastern addition
- Midland Avenue Collegiate Institute 1962
- North Albion Collegiate Institute 1962
- Bendale Vocational School 1963
- Sir Robert L. Borden Secondary School 1966
- West Park Secondary School (Bishop Marrocco/Thomas Merton Catholic Secondary School) 1968
- Stephen Leacock Collegiate Institute 1970
- Timothy Eaton Secondary School 1966
- Sir William Osler High School 1975
- York Humber High School 1992
- Scarborough Centre for Alternative Studies (Progress) 1994

== Gallery ==
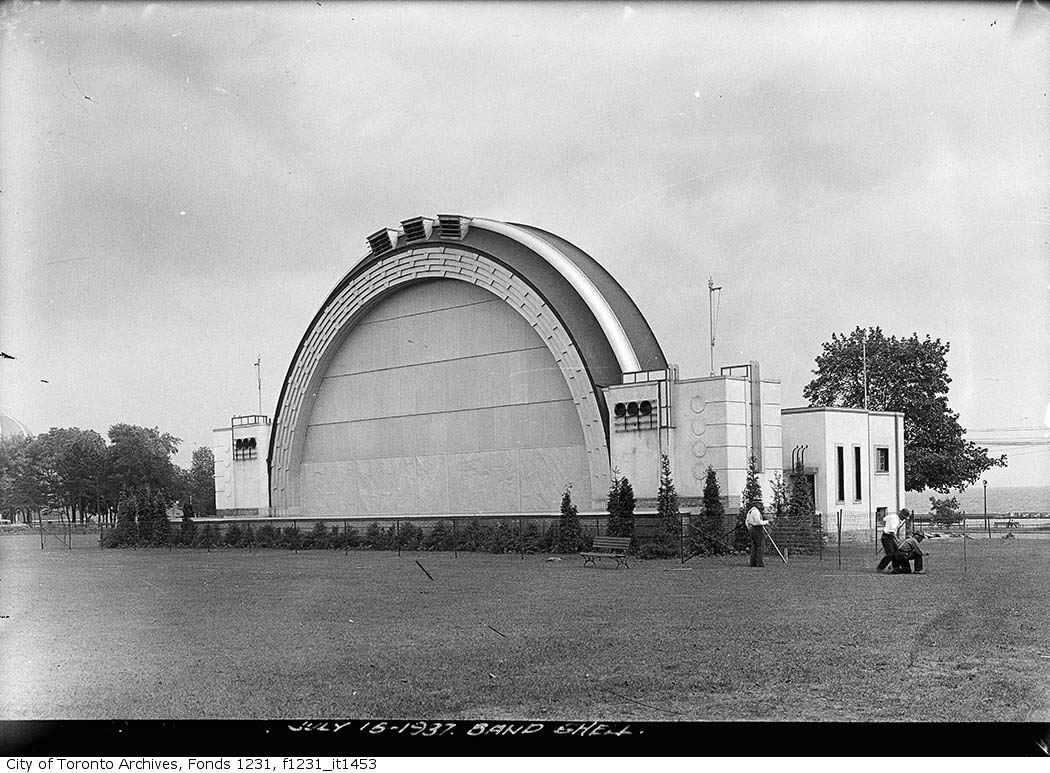
CNE Bandshell

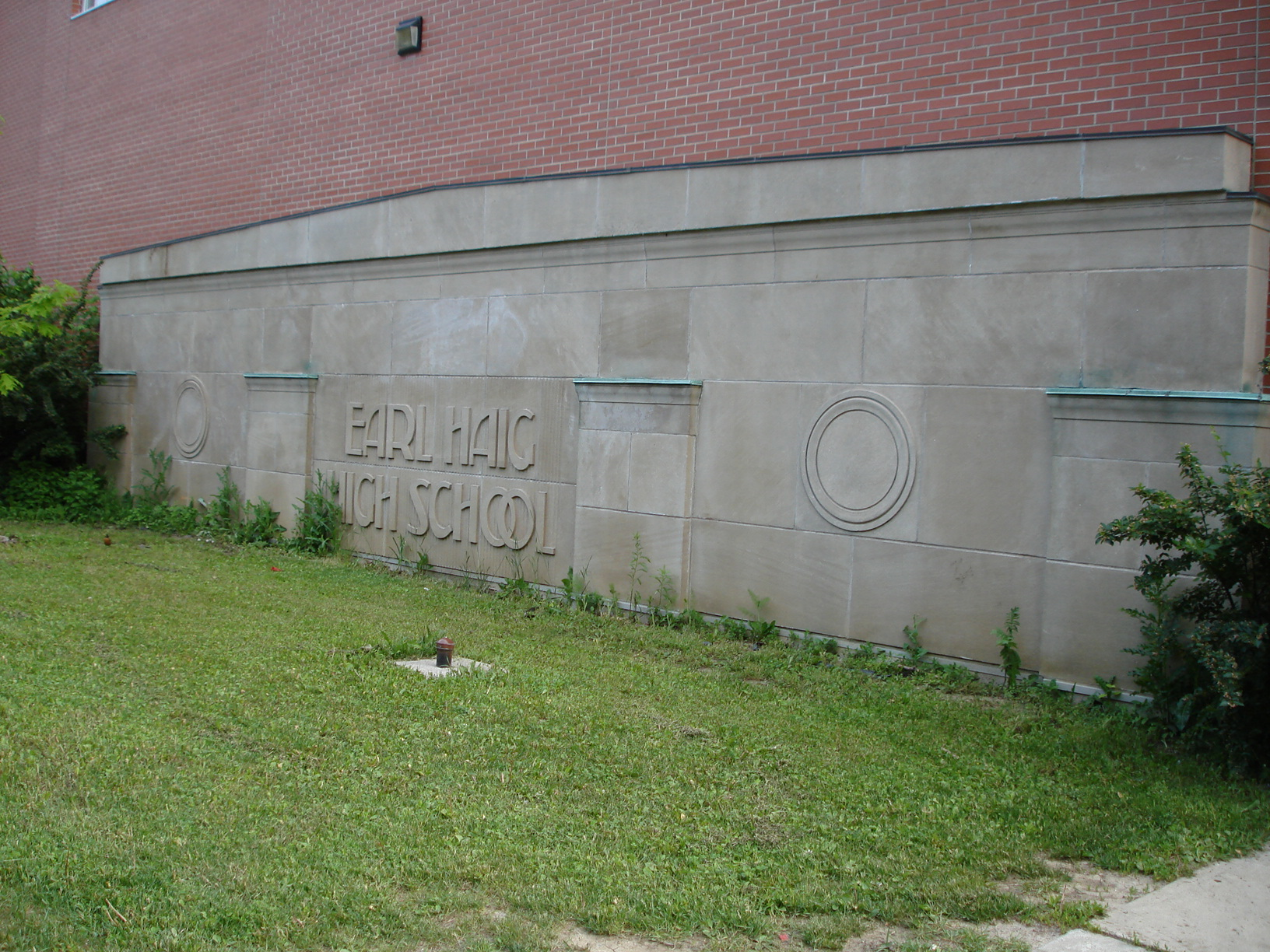
portion of original Earl Haig High School

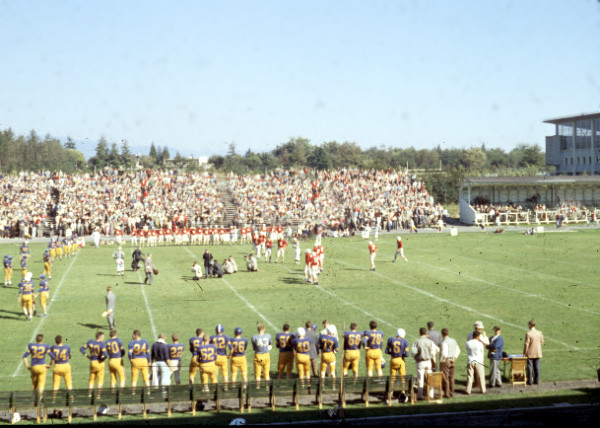
Field view of Varsity Stadium 1955

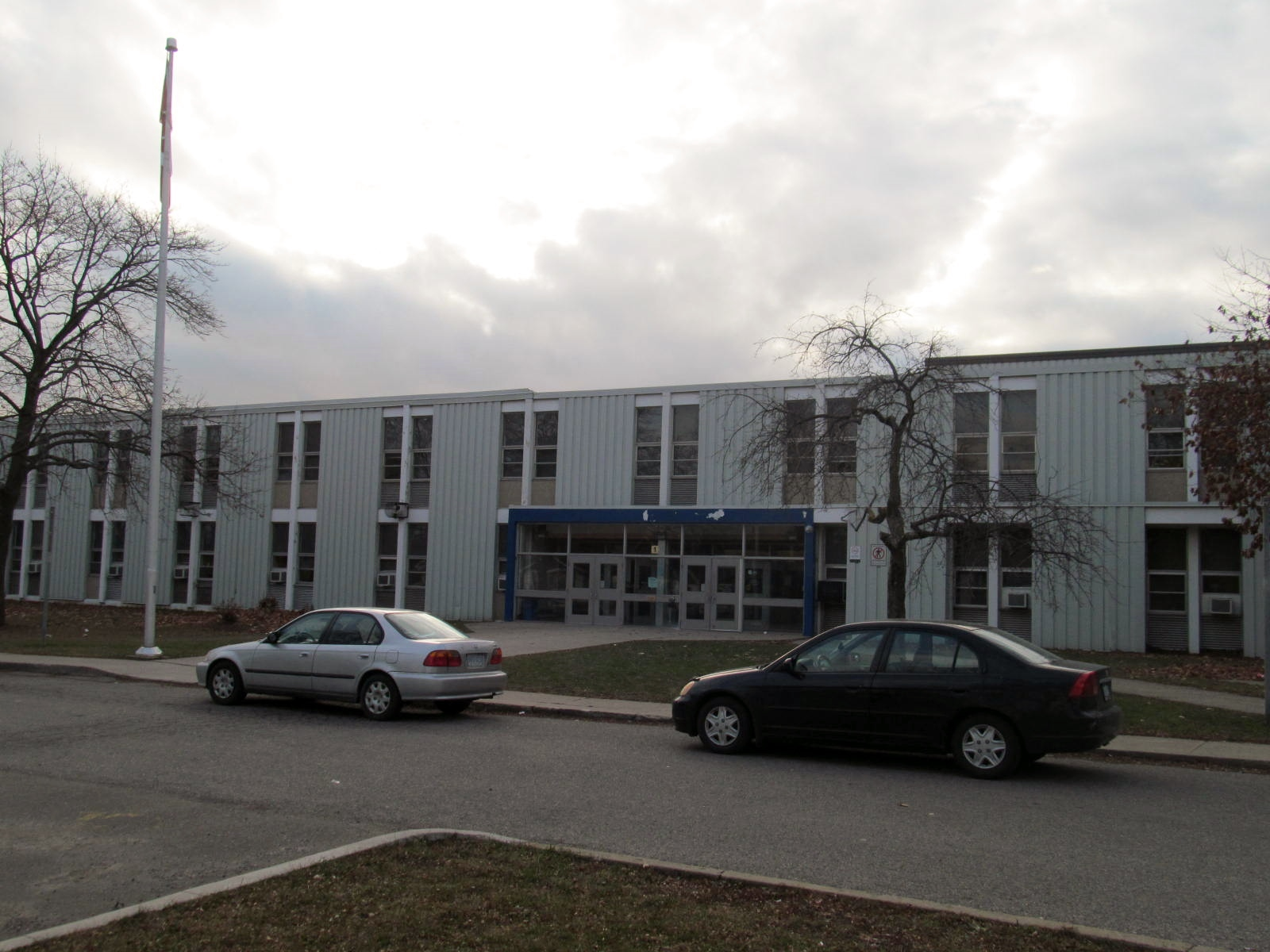
Midland Avenue Collegiate Institute

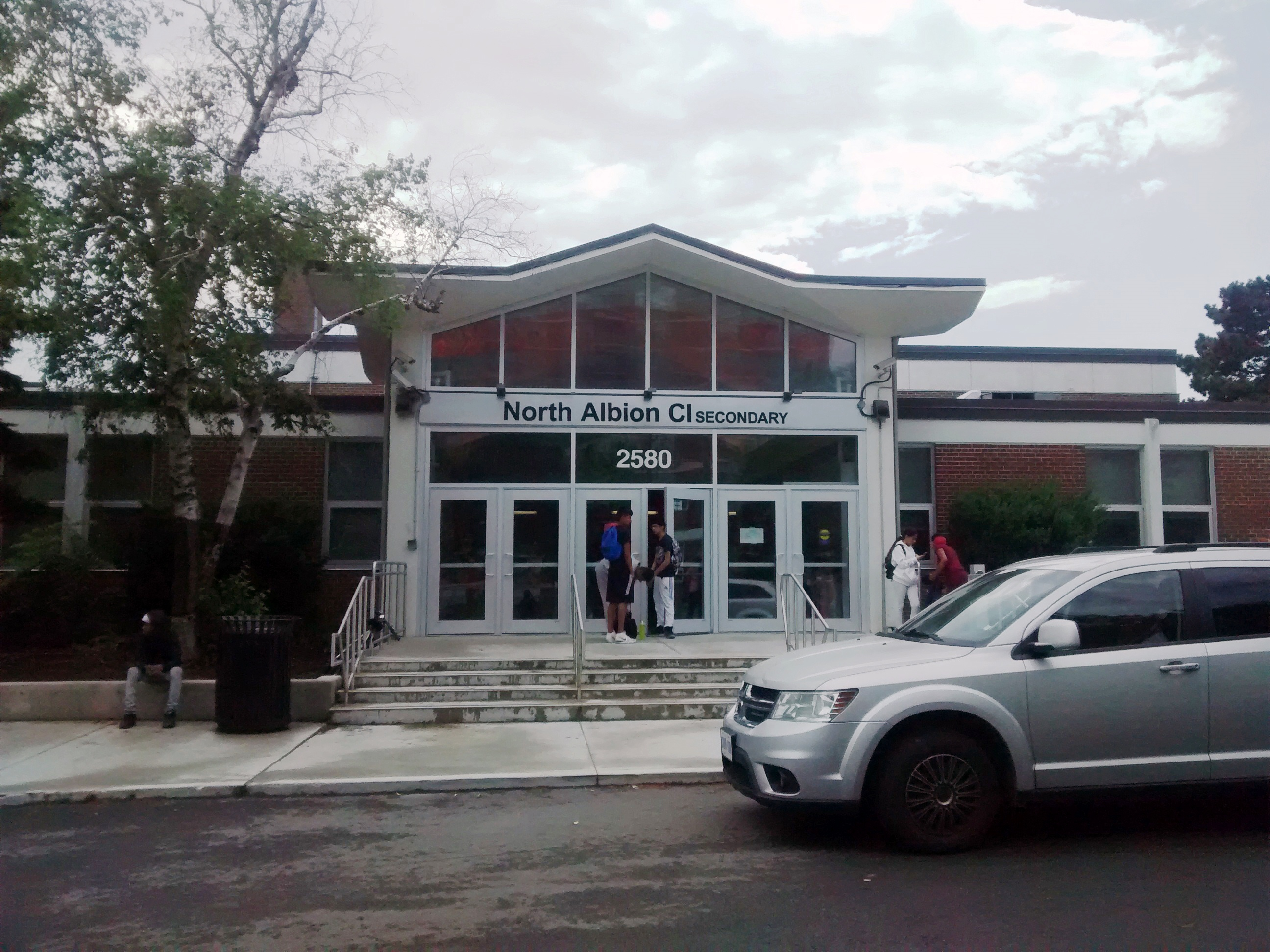
North Albion Collegiate Institute

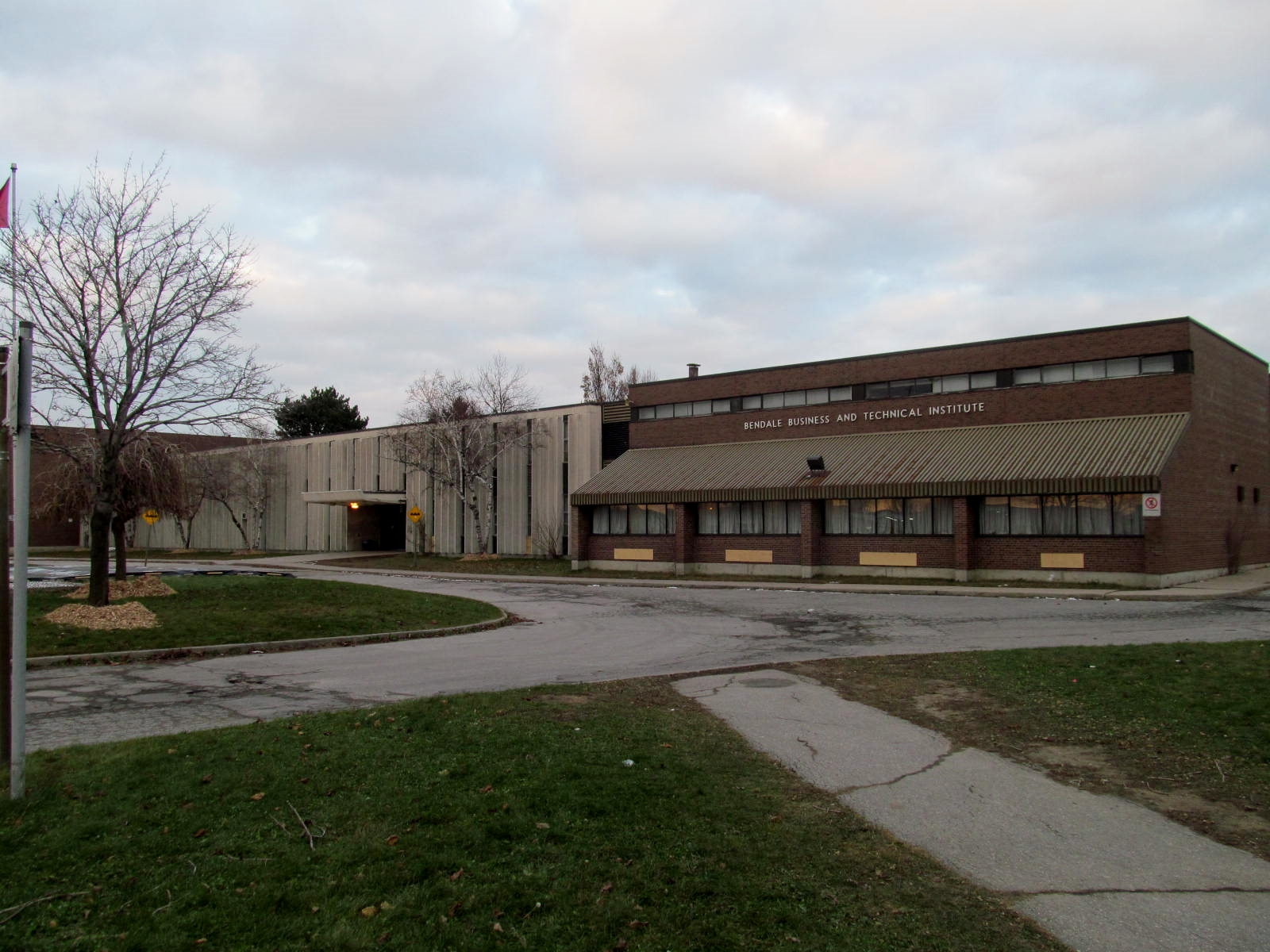
Bendale Business and Technical Institute

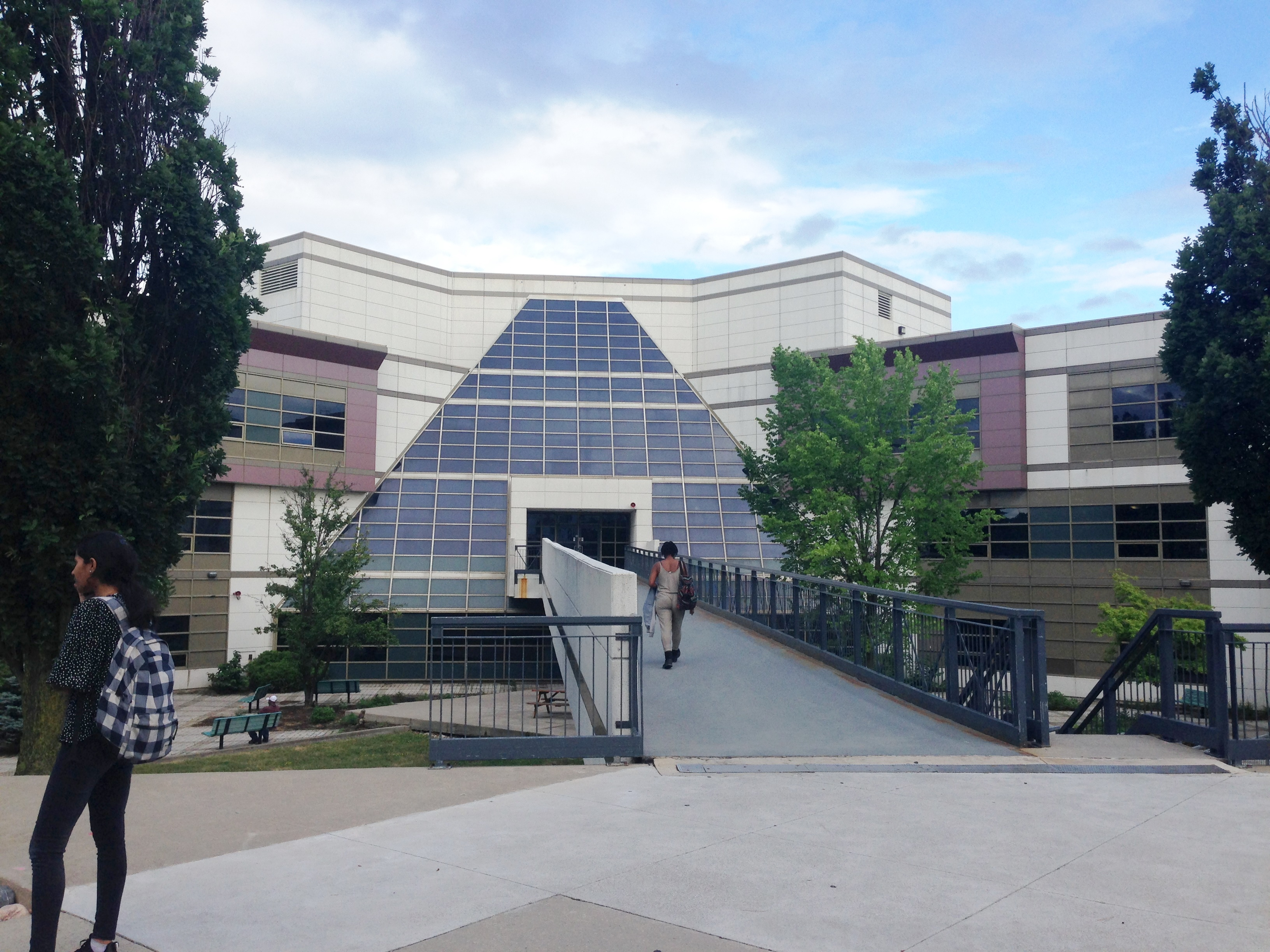
Scarborough Centre for Alternative Studies, new building 1994

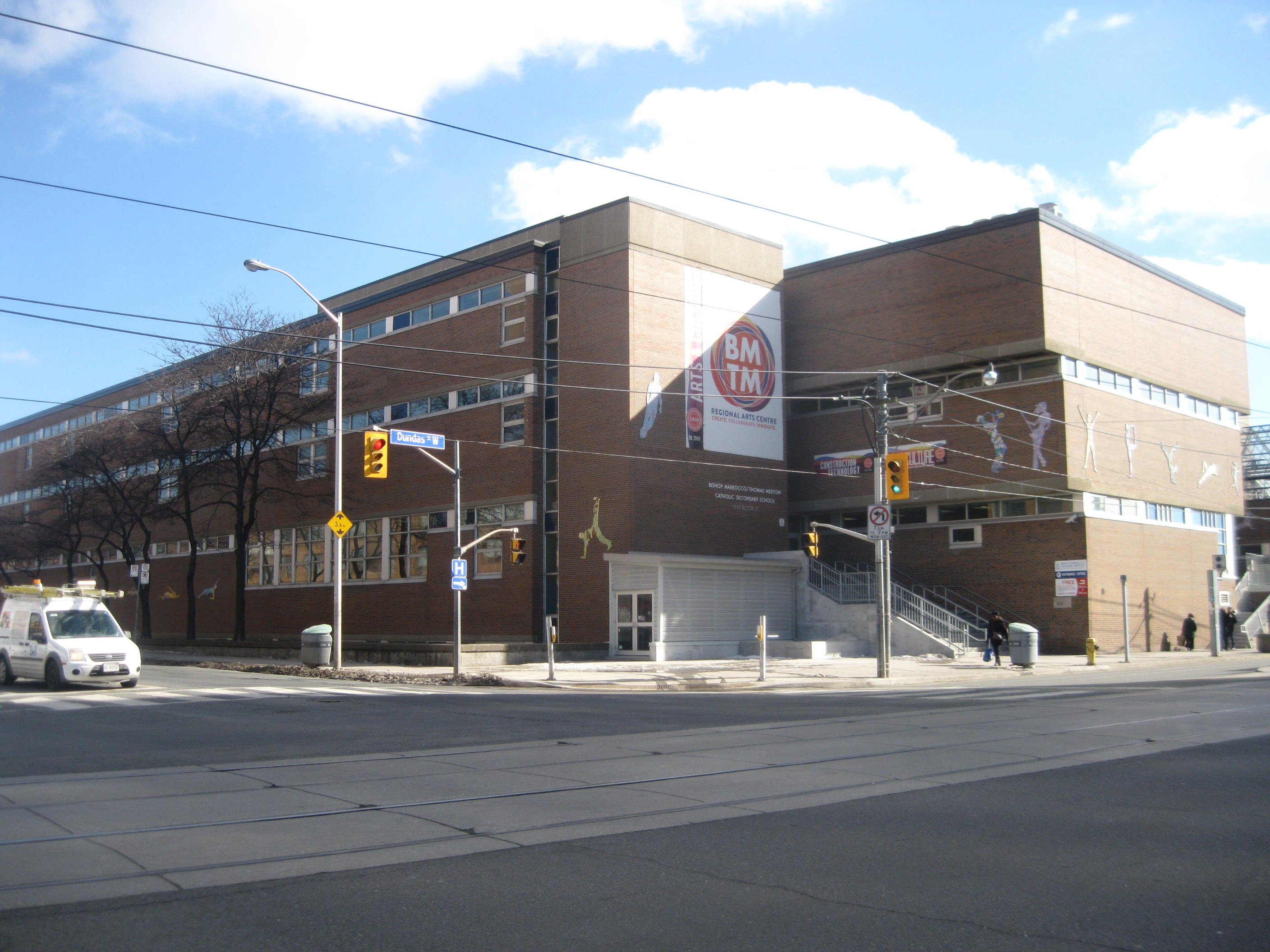
West Park Secondary School
