= Justice Building =

Office building on Parliament Hill in Ottawa

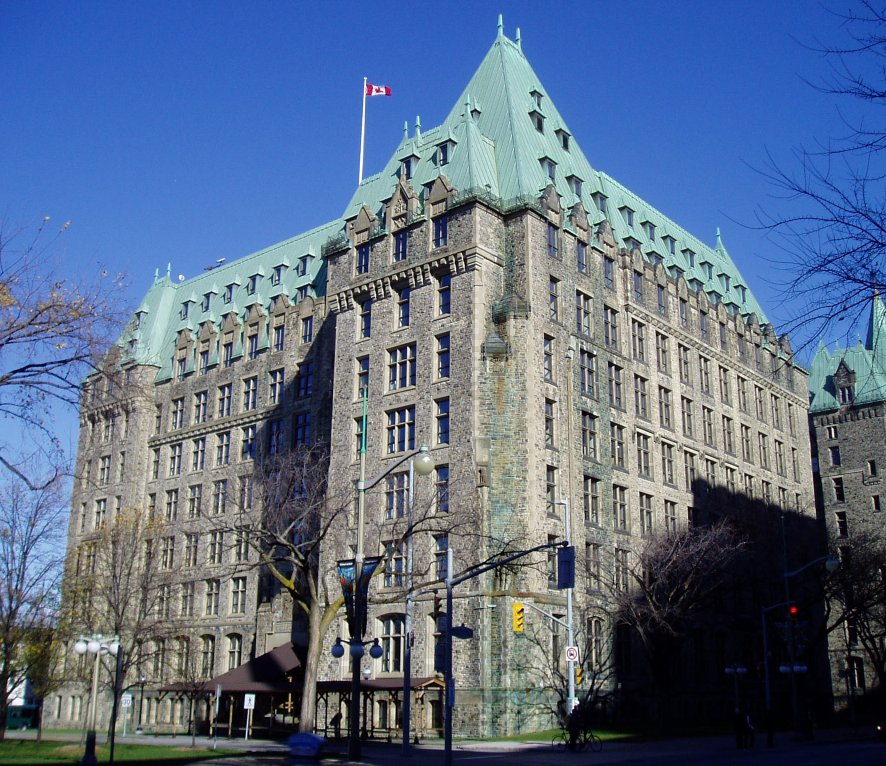
- Justice Building in 2005.

General information
- Architectural style: Victorian High Gothic
- Location: Ottawa, Ontario, Canada
- Coordinates: 45.421438°N 75.703831°W
- Construction started: 1935
- Completed: 1938
- Owner: The King in Right of Canada

Design and construction
- Architect: Thomas W. Fuller

The Justice Building is an office hill on Parliament Hill in Ottawa. The building was designed by Thomas W. Fuller and is called the 'Justice Building' because it was previously home to the Department of Justice.

Originally called Block D, it was built from 1935 to 1938 for the Royal Canadian Mounted Police (RCMP). It was renovated in 1998–2001 and now houses some of the offices of members of Parliament.

The building is part of Château Style architecture. Its design is similar to the Confederation Building located just east of it, which was also designed by Thomas W. Fuller.

In Ian Fleming's short story "For Your Eyes Only", James Bond visits the RCMP headquarters when it was located in this building, and the book contains a description of its structure.
