= Grace Morris Craig =

Canadian writer and artist

Grace Morris Craig (February 20, 1891 – 1987) was a Canadian writer and artist living in Ontario.

The daughter of James Lewis Morris and Mary Agnes Menzies, both of Scottish descent, she was born Grace MacFarlane Morris in Pembroke and studied at Branksome Hall in Toronto. She was refused admission to the architecture school at the University of Toronto because she was a woman. Craig volunteered at the Petawawa military base during World War I. She later worked as an architectural draughtsperson with the firm of Craig and Madill; in 1923, she married architect James Henry Craig, one of the firm's founders. Craig went on to study at the Ontario College of Art. She was a long-time member of the Toronto Heliconian Club. Her work was included in a 1957 exhibition by the Ontario Society of Artists.

In 1981, she published a memoir But This is Our War.

She died in Toronto in 1987.
