= Edwin Alexander Gardner =

Canadian architect

Edwin Alexander Gardner (1902–1986) was a Canadian architect. He succeeded Joseph Charles Gustave Brault as Canada's Chief Dominion Architect, serving in that post from 1952 to 1963.

Political offices
Preceded by Joseph Charles Gustave Brault	Chief Dominion Architect, Canada; 1952–1963	Succeeded by James Alfred Langford
