= Dominion Public Building =

Building in Toronto, Canada

Coordinates: 43.64592°N 79.377857°W

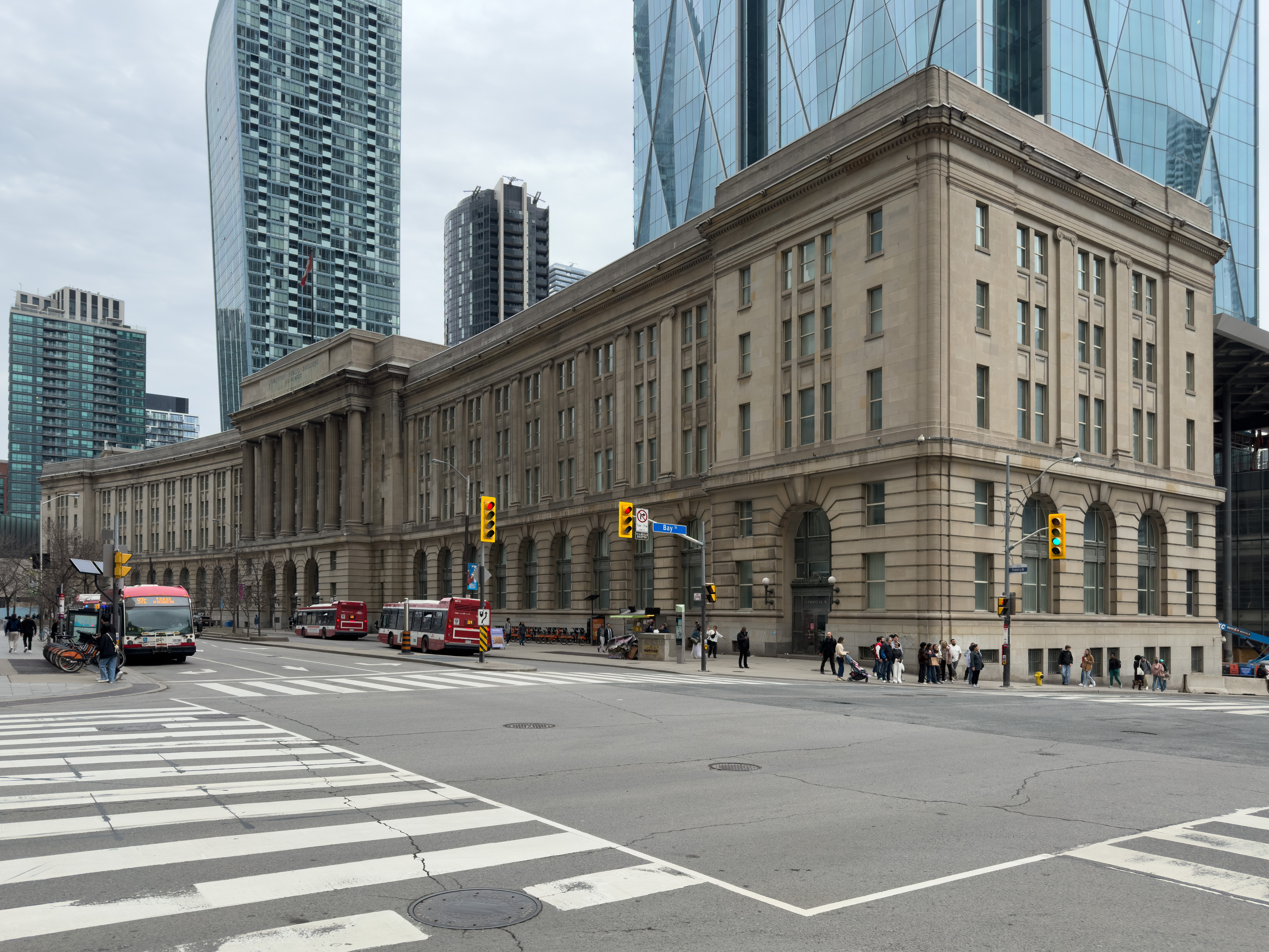
- Former names: Toronto Customs House

General information
- Status: Completed
- Architectural style: Beaux-Arts
- Location: 1 Front Street, Toronto, Ontario, Canada
- Current tenants: Government of Canada
- Construction started: 1926
- Completed: 1935
- Owner: Larco Investments

Design and construction
- Architects: Thomas W. Fuller; James Henry Craig
- Type: government office building

History
- Built: 1929–1935
- Original use: Classified Federal Heritage Building, designated September 19, 1983

Site notes
- Architect: T.W. Fuller
- Architectural style: Beaux-Arts design with Neo-Classical decoration
- Owner: Public Works and Government Services Canada (before 2017)

Ontario Heritage Act
- Designated: May 10, 2017

The Dominion Public Building is a five-storey Beaux-Arts neoclassical office building built between 1926 and 1935 for the Government of Canada at southeast corner of Front and Bay streets in Toronto, Ontario, Canada.

The building was designed by architects Thomas W. Fuller and James Henry Craig and originally served as Toronto's federal customs clearing house for the former Department of National Revenue. It remained a federal property, housing a number of administrative and support functions for the later Canada Customs and Revenue Agency (now the Canada Revenue Agency).

The building's north facade is curved to follow the property line along Front Street east of Bay Street. To the south is CIBC Square, formerly the site of the Union Station Bus Terminal which was previously the CP Express and Freight Building which itself replaced the old Grand Trunk Freight Shed after 1904.

On January 11, 2017, Canada Lands Company announced the pending sale of the property. By March 23, 2017, Larco Investments, owner of Ottawa's Chateau Laurier, had bought the Dominion Public Building.

Larco is adding two mixed use towers and transforming the building into a podium for retail tenants. Canada Revenue Agency is relocating staff to other locations in the GTA (Mississauga, North York (2 locations), Scarborough (Canada Centre Building) and Oshawa).

== Site history ==
Before the 1920s, the site was occupied by a series wholesale warehouses along Front from Bay to just west of Yonge. These buildings were destroyed by the Great Toronto Fire of 1904. To the east were the City's seventh Customs House and the annex Customs Examination Warehouse which were built in 1876 on the site of the sixth Customs House.

By 1919, the old Customs House was demolished and the stretch along Front laid vacant.

== Heritage Designation ==
The building was listed as Classified Federal Heritage Building in 1983. This designation stood until the building was sold. In 2015, Public Works and Government Services Canada requested that the City of Toronto's Heritage Preservation Services assess the property to determine whether it was worthy of designation as an individual property under Part IV, Section 29 of the Ontario Heritage Act. The property was listed under Part V of the Ontario Heritage Act as part of the Union Station Heritage Conservation District; because the federal government is not subject to the Act, compliance on their part was voluntary. The Heritage Conservation District designation is confined to the exterior of the building. Designation under Part IV of the Act allows for the protection of cultural heritage value and heritage attributes, including interior features of the building. The City of Toronto designated the Dominion Public building under Part IV of the Act on May 10, 2017.

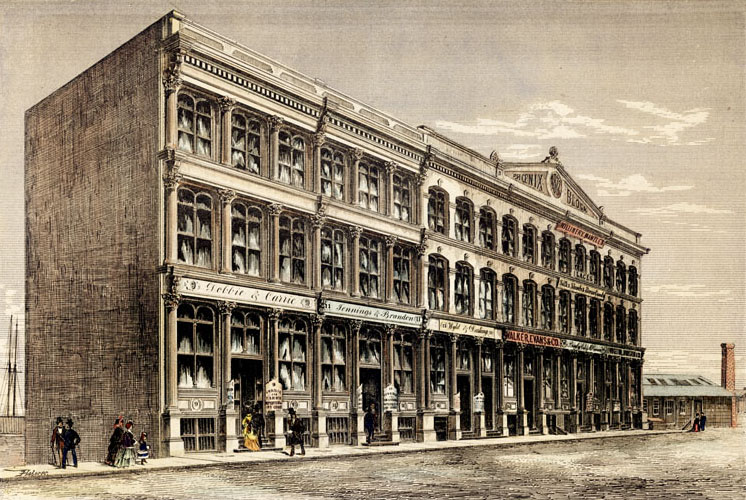
Wholesale warehouses along Front Street, c. 1872

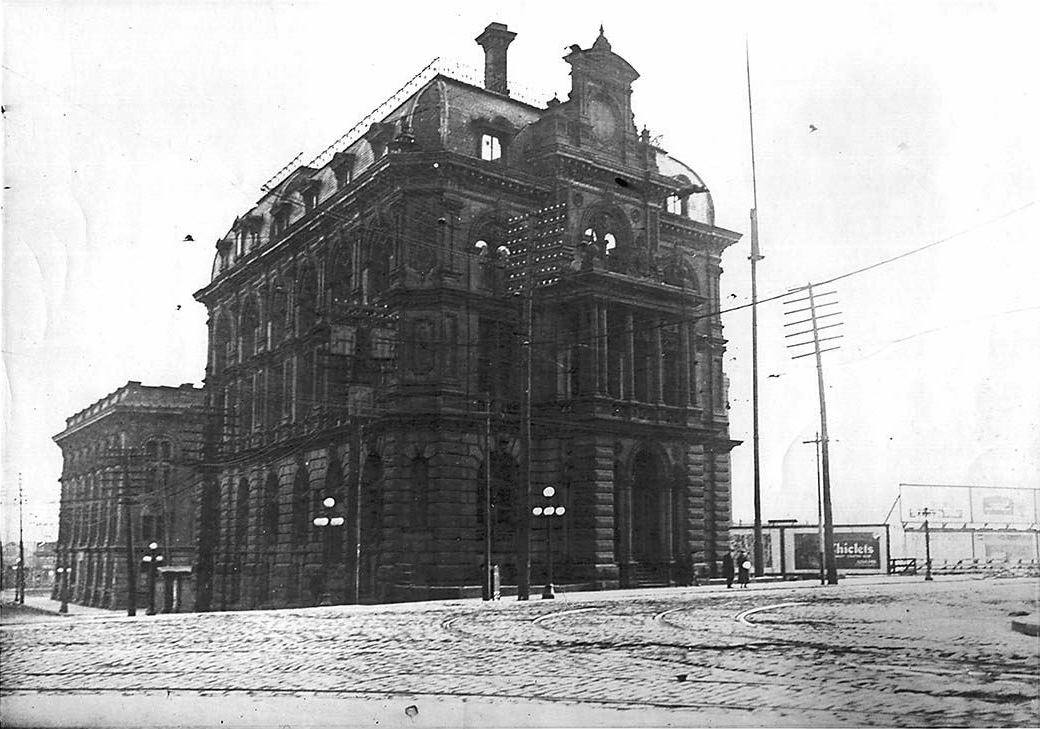
Old Customs House at corner of Front and Yonge Street

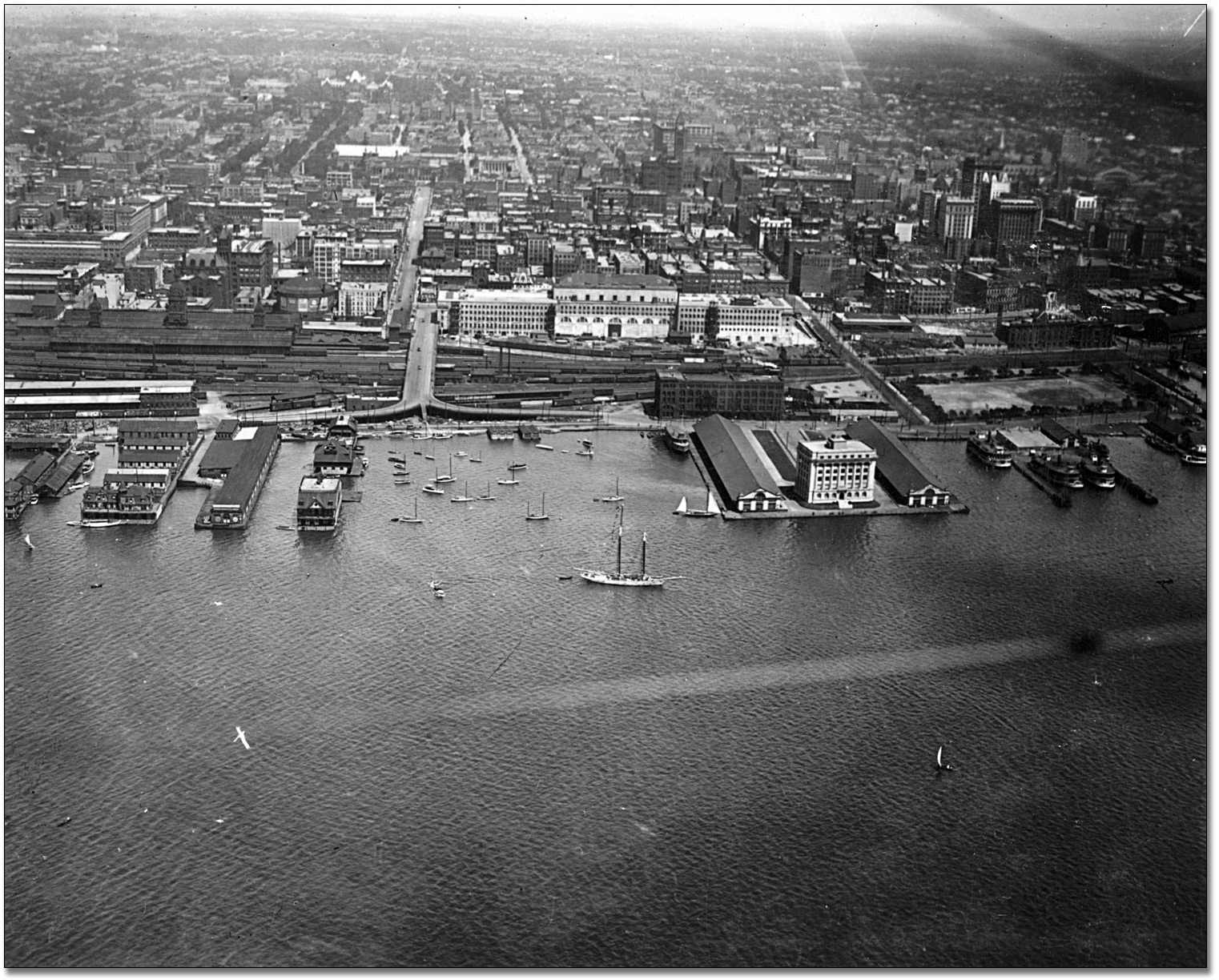
Site of Dominion Public Building to the north of the ferry docks and east of Union Station

== Other Dominion Public Buildings ==
In 1935–1936, the Dominion Public Building in Halifax, Nova Scotia, was built by Dominion architect Eric Temple.

The Art Deco/Modern Classicism Dominion Public Building at 457 Richmond Street in London, Ontario, was built in 1934–1935 for the Government of Canada as a Post Office by Dominion Chief Architect Thomas W. Fuller and renovated in 2007.

The Modern Classicism Dominion Public Building at 138 Wyndham Street North in Guelph, Ontario was built to house RCMP, Department of Agriculture, and post offices, and its construction contributed to the later demolition of the city's earlier post office and customs house. The building is currently in use by the County of Wellington.

The Dominion Public Building at 45 Main Street East in Hamilton, Ontario, opened in 1935 as a post office replacing an 1880s structure. In 1991, the Hamilton facility at 45 Main Street East was renovated and expanded to become the John Sopinka Courthouse. The building was built by local firm Hutton & Souter rather than by the Dominion architect.

Another building in Toronto, 330 Keele Street, also has the same name and was designed by Craig and Madill in 1935–1936, and is now used by Correctional Service of Canada as Keele Community Correctional Centre, a halfway house.

== See also ==
- McLaughlin Motor Car Showroom – also designed by Hutton & Souter
