= Charles D. Sutherland =

Canadian architect

- Born: November 28, 1879; Ottawa, Ontario, Canada
- Died: February 20, 1957; Ottawa, Ontario, Canada
- Occupation: Architect
- Practice: Chief Dominion Architect (1936–1947)

Charles D Sutherland (1879–1957) was a Canadian architect who served as Chief Dominion Architect from 1936–1947. Ewart apprenticed under John Albert Ewart from 1897 to 1901 and studied at the Ottawa School of Art. As chief government architect he was responsible for many of the federal buildings constructed in this period. Drawings for public buildings such as Post Office Buildings and Dominion Public Buildings designed by Sutherland and his staff during his tenure as Chief Architect of the Department of Public Works are now held at the National Archives of Canada. Joseph Charles Gustave Brault, (1886–1954) succeeded Charles D. Sutherland as Chief Architect of the federal Dept. of Public Works in 1947.

== Career ==
As federal architect, 1936–1947, Charles D. Sutherland oversaw the design and construction of public buildings such as post offices, customs offices, and armouries across Canada. He designed a Customs Building in St. Jean, Quebec, Richelieu Street, (1939) and Armstrong, Quebec, Canadian Customs Border Station, (1940). He designed several buildings in Ottawa, Ontario including: Wind Tunnel and Administration Building, Hwy. 17 at Skead Road (1939–40); Temporary Office Buildings No. 5 and No. 6, (1942). He designed the Daly Building Annex, Mackenzie Avenue near Wellington Street, Ottawa, Ontario, 1942. He designed a Veterans Hospital, 4th Street West at 12th Avenue West, Calgary, Alberta, 1942.

== Works ==
Building	Year Completed	Builder	Style	Location	Image
Cornwall Armoury 505 4th Street East at Marlborough Street	1938-9 Charles D. Sutherland	1996 Recognized – Register of the Government of Canada Heritage Buildings	Cornwall, Ontario	Housing The Stormont, Dundas and Glengarry Highlanders, this centrally located Tudorbethan building with a low-pitched gable roof was constructed of buff-coloured brick with stone trim.	
Quebec Armoury and HMCS Montcalm Training Centre 835 Laurier Avenue East	1938-9 Charles D. Sutherland	Canada's Register of Historic Places	Quebec City	Overlooking the historic battlefield of Quebec, the rectangular 3 storey stone building is in the picturesque Chateau-style	
Salaberry Armoury 188 Alexandre Taché Blvd	1938 (completed) Charles D. Sutherland	Canada's Register of Historic Places; Recognized – 1993 Register of the Government of Canada Heritage Buildings	Gatineau, Quebec	centrally located Romanesque Revival building with a steeply pitched gable roof houses Régiment de Hull	
Winnipeg Drill Hall & Korea Hall, Canadian Forces Base Winnipeg	1941 Charles D. Sutherland	Drill Hall Building 21 Recognized – 1997; Drill Hall Korea Hall B8 Recognized – 2004 Register of the Government of Canada Heritage Buildings	Winnipeg, Manitoba	large centrally located wood, metal and brick building with a low-pitched gable roof with a large interior space for the drill hall, and low, shed-roofed 'lean-tos' running along its north and south elevations.	

- Charles D. Sutherland, Chief Dominion Architect 1936–1947

Political offices
Preceded by Thomas W. Fuller	Chief Dominion Architect, Canada; 1936- – 1947	Succeeded by Joseph Charles Gustave Brault
