= Chief Dominion Architect =

Chief Dominion Architect was a position created in 1871 by the Government of Canada to help design public federal buildings across Canada. The role reported to the Minister of Public Works.

From World War II onwards to 1973 (renamed Chief Architect) the role was diminished with work being contracted out to third parties and finally replaced with a bureaucrat (Assistant Deputy Minister for Design and Construction, Department of Public Works and now Assistant Deputy Minister for the Real Property Branch, Public Works and Government Services Canada) responsible for finding external architects instead.

== List of Architects ==
- Thomas Seaton Scott 1872–1881
- Thomas Fuller 1881–1896
- David Ewart 1896–1914
- Edgar Lewis Horwood 1915–1917
- Richard Cotsman Wright 1918–1927
- Thomas W. Fuller 1927–1936
- Charles D. Sutherland 1936–1947
- Joseph Charles Gustave Brault 1947–1952
- Edwin Alexander Gardner 1952–1963
- James Alfred Langford 1963–1975

Frederick Preston Rubidge was a lead government architect for many projects prior to the formation of the title, first for the Province of Canada beginning in 1841, then with the federal Department of Public Works from 1867 to 1872.
