= Dominion Public Building (Halifax, Nova Scotia) =

Building in Nova Scotia, Canada

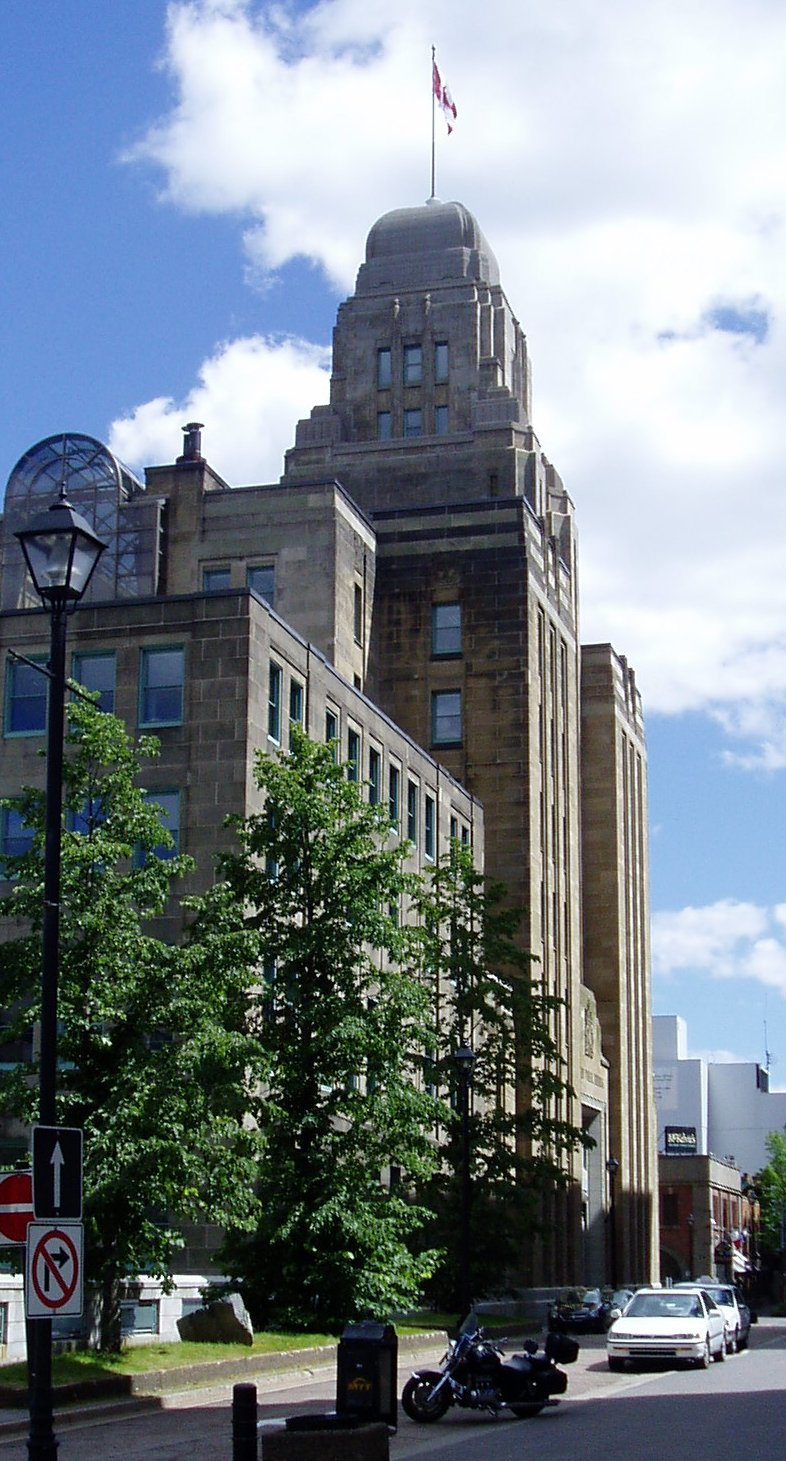
- Dominion Public Building, Halifax
- Interactive map of the Dominion Public Building area
- Alternative names: Main/Halifax Post Office, Federal Office

General information
- Architectural style: Art Deco
- Location: Halifax, Nova Scotia, 1713 Bedford Row
- Coordinates: 44.64802°N 63.57203°W
- Current tenants: Public Works and Government Services Canada
- Completed: 1936
- Renovated: Interior: 1990s Exterior: 2008-2009

Height
- Height: 53.27 m (174.8 ft)

Technical details
- Floor count: 13

Renovating team
- Awards: Lieutenant Governor’s Citation for Adaptive Reuse and Restoration (1993)

The Dominion Public Building is an Art Deco-style office building located in Halifax, Nova Scotia. Completed in 1936, it served as the central post office for the City of Halifax and housed various other government offices.

A four-story addition using similar materials was added to the north of the original building in 1962. In the early 1990s, Canada Post transferred the building to Public Works Canada. Public Works undertook extensive interior renovations to convert the building to general office use, which included the installation of a glass atrium over the former light court of the 4th-7th floors to create more contiguous space. Between 2008 and 2009, it undertook extensive repairs on the tower portion of the building. These included complete removal, cleaning, and restoration of the sandstone exterior and repairs to the underlying steel frame. The tower restoration also included the installation of a new copper dome similar to the original.

Although since surpassed, the Dominion Public Building was the tallest building in Halifax at the time of its completion in 1936. The building is a federally recognized heritage building. Notable heritage features include the stone structure, the large stone seahorses at the roof level and in the main lobby, the remaining brass postal wickets and the lobby's marble floors and dedication to Edward VIII. The Dominion Public Building is fully occupied by Public Services and Procurement Canada (formerly Public Works and Government Services Canada).

== See also ==
- List of buildings in the Halifax Regional Municipality
- Dominion Public Building (Toronto)
- Dominion Building, Vancouver
- Former tallest buildings in Canada by province and territory
