= Joseph Charles Gustave Brault =

Canadian architect (1886–1954)

- Born: 15 March 1886; Montreal, Quebec
- Died: 7 May 1954 (aged 68); Montreal, Quebec
- Education: Mont St. Louis College; Cornell University
- Occupation: Architect
- Practice: Chief Dominion Architect (1946–1952)

Joseph Charles Gustave Brault (1886–1954) was a Canadian architect who served as Chief Dominion Architect from 1947 to 1952. As chief government architect he was responsible for many of the federal buildings constructed in this period. Drawings for public buildings such as Post Office Buildings and Dominion Public Buildings designed by Brault and his staff during his tenure as Chief Architect of the Department of Public Works are now held at the National Archives of Canada.

Joseph Charles Gustave Brault was born in Montreal, Quebec on 15 March 1886. He attended Mont-St-Louis College in 1901–06. He articled in Montreal, Quebec with Edward & W.S. Maxwell in 1907–08. He articled with Ross & MacFarlane in 1910–11. He also trained in offices of Marchand & Haskell and Kenneth Rea as a summer student. He attended courses in architecture at Cornell University in 1911–12. He worked as a draftsman in Montreal, Quebec for Ross and MacFarlane and for Barott, Blackader & Webster. He joined the Department of Public Works as a staff architect from 1913–1947 in Ottawa, Ontario. He was appointed Chief Architect of the Department of Public Works from 1947 until he retired in 1952. He died on 7 May 1954 in Montreal.

== Works ==
During the period of rapid growth following World War II his work included planning for new structures and major additions to Post Offices known as Dominion Public Buildings, Customs & Immigration facilities at new border crossings, and military hospitals. He designed Customs & Immigration Buildings in Edmundston, New Brunswick (1947); Phillipsburg, Quebec (1947); Saint John, New Brunswick (1948); Armstrong, Quebec (1948); Lacollege, Quebec (1948) and Coutts, Alberta (1950). He designed a Forward Mail Building in Edmonton, Alberta in 1948.

Political offices
Preceded by Charles D. Sutherland	Chief Dominion Architect, Canada; 1946–1952	Succeeded by Edwin Alexander Gardner
