= Thomas W. Fuller =

Canadian architect (1865–1951)

Thomas William Fuller
- Born: May 3, 1865; Ottawa, Canada West
- Died: November 4, 1951 (aged 86); Ottawa, Ontario, Canada
- Occupation: Architect
- Practice: Chief Dominion Architect

Thomas William Fuller (May 3, 1865 – November 4, 1951), the son of Thomas Fuller, was a Canadian architect. Before his selection as Dominion Architect, Fuller designed a number of federal buildings in Dawson City, Yukon, some of which are now designated as National Historic Sites of Canada. These include the Post Office (1899); Court House (1900–01); Territorial Administration Building, 5th Avenue (1901); Public School (1901) which burned 1957; and Commissioner's Residence (1901).

He served as Chief Dominion Architect from 1927 to 1936, designing a number of prominent public buildings in Canada. Thomas W. Fuller designed a number of post offices:

- Outremont, Quebec, Bernard Avenue, (1928–29); Hespeler, Ontario Queen Street East, (1928); Fort Frances, Ontario (1929); Saskatoon, Saskatchewan, 1st Avenue, 1929; Moncton, New Brunswick (1931); Penetanguishene, Ontario (1931); Perth, Ontario (1933); Montreal, Quebec, St. James Street (1932); Montreal, Quebec Notre-Dame-de-Grace Sherbrooke Street East (1934–35); Fort William, Ontario, Syndicate Avenue near Donald Street (1934); Montreal, Quebec, Central Post Office, Peel Street, (1935); Amherst, Nova Scotia (1935).

His son, Thomas G. Fuller, founded Thomas Fuller Construction company in 1958 which built many public buildings in Ottawa as well as the sheltered harbour for the Britannia Yacht Club. In 2002, the company was awarded a contract to renovate the Canadian Library of Parliament.

== Works ==
Site	Date(s)	Designated	Location	Description	Image
Dawson Post Office; Third Avenue and King Street	1900		Dawson City, Yukon	Two-storey wooden building with a three-storey hexagonal tower. The building incorporates post-office and a telegraph annex.	
Territorial Administration Building; 595 Fifth Avenue	1901		Dawson City, Yukon	A two-storey neoclassical building, built with fir and cedar imported to the Yukon from British Columbia. The design features elements used elsewhere in Fuller's Dawson building program, including pediments, columns, axial symmetry, and gentle relief.	
Mewata Armouries; 801 11th Street S.W.	1915-8		Calgary, Alberta	The building was designed in a Tudor/Gothic Revival style. A classic example of armoury design, Mewata has features deliberately bringing to mind a medieval fortress or castle, including four square corner towers, four smaller six sided towers, and buttresses with turrets and a crenellated roofline.	
Bessborough Armoury 2025 West 11th Avenue	1932-3	Vancouver Inventory of heritage buildings "B" Category; Recognized - 1997 - Register of the Government of Canada Heritage Buildings;	Vancouver, British Columbia	large Neo-Gothic style structure with a low-pitched gable roof on a flat site faced by mature trees within an area of containing light industry, and adjacent to a residential area	
Victoria Rifles Armoury, 691 Cathcart Street	1933	1984 Register of the Government of Canada Heritage Buildings	Montréal, Quebec	Housing Le Régiment de Maisonneuve, this Gothic Revival armoury's two-dimensional façade with a low-pitched gable roof is pressed up against its urban streetscape	
Côte des Neiges Armoury 4185 Chemin de la Côte des Neiges,	1934-35	1991 Register of the Government of Canada Heritage Buildings	Montréal, Quebec	On a treed site on the southwest perimeter of Mount Royal Park, this Châteauesque structure houses The Royal Canadian Hussars (Montreal); 2nd Field Regiment, Royal Canadian Artillery	
Regina Armoury, 1600 Elphinstone Avenue,	1928	Recognized - 1998 on the Register of the Government of Canada Heritage Buildings	Regina, Saskatchewan	This centrally located Neo-Gothic style fortress like building with a low-pitched gable roof is in a modern residential neighbourhood adjacent to the Regina Exhibition Grounds, Organizations that use the armoury include: Regina units of 38th Brigade Group: 10th Field Regiment, Royal Canadian Artillery, Royal Regina Rifles, 16th (Saskatchewan) Service Battalion, 16th Medical Company, cadet corps and the Military Museum of Saskatchewan	
Rouyn Armoury	1935-6	Recognized - 1983 Register of the Government of Canada Heritage Buildings	Rouyn, Quebec	centrally located, symmetrical Neo-Gothic style building with a steeply pitched gable roof	
Seaforth Armoury 1650 Burrard Street	1936 (completed)	Classified - 1997 Register of the Government of Canada Heritage Buildings	Vancouver, British Columbia	designed by architects McCarter and Nairne, the massive, low-massed, asymmetrical, concrete Neo-Gothic style structure with a fortified appearance is as a Class A Heritage Building in downtown Vancouver housing The Seaforth Highlanders of Canada	
Confederation Building (Ottawa), Wellington Street at Bank Street	1928-31		Ottawa, Ontario		
The Ore Building, Booth Street	1929		Ottawa, Ontario		
Custom House, Front Street West at Yonge Street	1930-31		Toronto, Ontario		
Department of Justice Building, Wellington Street	1935-7		Ottawa, Ontario		
Dominion Public Building, 457 Richmond Street	1935-1936		London, Ontario		
Federal Building, Sinclair Centre	1935-1937		Vancouver, British Columbia	Beaux-Arts extension of Post Office Building by David Ewart	
Lloydminster Old Post Office	1931	A National Historic Site of Canada since 1981	Lloydminster		
Federal Building; 101 22nd Street East	1929		Saskatoon	Five story 'Scrapped' Beaux-Arts that housed different government offices like Weights & Measures, the Department of Agriculture, Immigration Offices, and the Post Office.	

Political offices
Preceded by Richard Cotsman Wright	Chief Dominion Architect, Canada; 1927 – 1936	Succeeded by Charles D. Sutherland
