= List of historic places in Ottawa =

This article is a list of historic places in the City of Ottawa, Ontario entered on the Canadian Register of Historic Places, whether they are federal, provincial, or municipal.

See also List of historic places in Ontario.

== List of historic places ==
Name	Address	Coordinates	Government recognition (CRHP №)	Wikidata ID	Image
The Beggs House	2323 Roger Stevens Drive; Ottawa (North Gower) ON	45°07′54″N 75°42′57″W	Ottawa (North Gower) municipality (14209)		Upload Photo
Building 7; Health Protection Building (Former Department of Health & Welfare, Food and Drug Laboratory)	Tunney's Pasture Campus; Ottawa ON	45°24′27″N 75°44′09″W	Federal (12897)		
Cheney House	176 Bronson Avenue; Ottawa ON	45°24′52″N 75°42′27″W	Ottawa municipality (18596)		Upload Photo
Commissariat Building	3 Canal Lane, Rideau Canal National Historic Site of Canada; Ottawa (Downtown Ottawa) ON	45°25′33″N 75°41′52″W	Federal (11116)		More images
Davidson House	3150 Donnelly Drive; Ottawa ON	45°02′23″N 75°42′22″W	Ottawa municipality (10298)		Upload Photo
The Kelly House	6576 Main Street (Fourth Line); Ottawa (North Gower) ON	45°07′58″N 75°43′05″W	Ottawa (North Gower) municipality (15291)		Upload Photo
Martin House	6732 Rideau Valley Drive South; Ottawa (Kars) ON	45°08′57″N 75°38′49″W	Ottawa (Kars) municipality (19796)		Upload Photo
Trinity United Church	6656 Rideau Valley Drive S Ottawa (Kars) ON	45°09′17″N 75°38′56″W	Ottawa (Kars) municipality (14208)		Upload Photo
Weatherhead House	6924 Gallagher Road; Ottawa (Pierces Corners) ON	45°03′31″N 75°45′46″W	Ottawa (Pierces Corners) municipality (16323)		Upload Photo
Bryan House	6700 Rideau Valley Drive South; Ottawa (Kars) ON	45°09′08″N 75°38′53″W	Ottawa (Kars) municipality (10142)		Upload Photo
The Weaver's House	1131 Mill Street; Ottawa (Manotick) ON	45°13′34″N 75°41′01″W	Ottawa (Manotick) municipality (14212)		More images
New Edinburgh Heritage Conservation District	along the Rideau River, bounded by Sussex, MacKay, Dufferin and Stanley; Ottawa (New Edinburgh) ON	45°26′28″N 75°41′20″W	Ottawa (New Edinburgh) municipality (8447)		
"N" Division, Stable Building	1 Sandridge Rd; Ottawa (Manor Park) ON	45°27′24″N 75°39′19″W	Federal (4631)		
Aberdeen Pavilion	Ottawa (The Glebe) ON	45°24′00″N 75°40′58″W	Federal (4114)	Q4666960	More images
Hay House	700 Echo Drive; Ottawa (Old Ottawa South) ON	45°23′51″N 75°40′47″W	Ottawa (Old Ottawa South) municipality (14211)		More images
Victoria Memorial Museum Building (Canadian Museum of Nature)	Ottawa (Centretown) ON	45°24′46″N 75°41′20″W	Federal (9657, (4483)	Q1032232	More images
Central Experimental Farm	Ottawa (River Ward) ON	45°22′57″N 75°42′49″W	Federal (13811)	Q4504150	More images
Château Laurier	Ottawa (Downtown Ottawa) ON	45°25′32″N 75°41′42″W	Federal (14549)	Q2089212	More images
CFS Carp (Diefenbunker)	Ottawa (Carp) ON	45°21′06″N 76°02′50″W	Federal (4169)	Q5010827	More images
Government Conference Centre	2 Rideau Street; Ottawa (Sandy Hill) ON	45°25′29″N 75°41′37″W	Federal (4305)		More images
National Research Council of Canada, Building M-12	1200 Montreal Road; Ottawa (Rideau-Rockcliffe Ward) ON	45°26′54″N 75°37′00″W	Federal (10160)		Upload Photo
Notre-Dame Cathedral Basilica	Ottawa (Lowertown) ON	45°25′47″N 75°41′47″W	Federal (12135), Ottawa (Lowertown) municipality (8448)	Q1051168	More images
Former Ottawa Teachers' College (Ottawa Normal School)	Ottawa (Ottawa City Hall) ON	45°25′12″N 75°41′27″W	Federal (7437)	Q7109219	More images
Rideau Canal	Rideau Street, Ottawa / Kingston; ON	45°25′35″N 75°41′53″W	Federal (5727)	Q651323	More images
Rideau Hall, Complex as a whole	1 Sussex Drive; Ottawa (New Edinburgh) ON	45°26′38″N 75°41′09″W	Federal (16881)		More images
Rideau Hall Visitor Centre	11 Rideau Gate; Ottawa (New Edinburgh) ON	45°26′39″N 75°41′29″W	Federal (21062)		
Saint Brigid's Church	314 St. Patrick Street; Ottawa (Byward Market) ON	45°25′53″N 75°41′27″W	Ontario (8906), Ottawa (Byward Market) municipality (18642)		More images
Church of St. Alban the Martyr	125 Daly Street; Ottawa (Sandy Hill) ON	45°25′39″N 75°41′06″W	Ontario (10422)		More images
Central Heating Plant	Tunney's Pasture; Ottawa (Tunney's Pasture) ON	45°24′19″N 75°44′15″W	Federal (12921)		
Coach House for Prime Minister's Residence	10 Sussex Drive; Ottawa ON	45°26′41″N 75°41′33″W	Federal (19636)		More images
Statistics Canada - Main Building (Former Dominion Bureau of Statistics Building)	Ottawa (Tunney's Pasture) ON	45°24′21″N 75°44′03″W	Federal (13122)	Q6735940	More images
304-312 Queen Elizabeth Driveway	0, 304-312 Queen Elizabeth Driveway; Ottawa (The Glebe) ON	45°24′24″N 75°40′58″W	Ottawa (The Glebe) municipality (10058)		More images
41 York Street	41 York Street; Ottawa (Byward Market) ON	45°25′41″N 75°41′37″W	Ottawa (Byward Market) municipality (13413)		
419-423 Sussex Drive	419-423 Sussex Drive; Ottawa (Byward Market) ON	45°25′50″N 75°41′47″W	Federal (4627)		
Administration Building	588 Booth Street; Ottawa (Glebe Annex) ON	45°23′59″N 75°42′20″W	Federal (11137)		
Arc Biotech Building (No. 34)	Ottawa (River Ward) ON	45°23′30″N 75°42′47″W	Federal (9591)	Q24046200	More images
Bank of Montreal	144 Wellington St. Ottawa (Downtown) ON	45°25′20″N 75°41′59″W	Federal (16147)		More images
Bank of Nova Scotia	125 Sparks Street; Ottawa (Downtown) ON	45°25′21″N 75°41′54″W	Federal (16481)		More images
Bate Building	109-111 Sparks Street; Ottawa (Downtown) ON	45°25′22″N 75°41′53″W	Federal (7392)		More images
Beechwood Cemetery	Ottawa (Rideau-Rockcliffe Ward) ON	45°26′49″N 75°39′36″W	Federal (1210)	Q4087599	More images
Billings Estate	Ottawa (Alta Vista) ON	45°23′23″N 75°40′20″W	Federal (12622)	Q4911946	More images
Birks Building	107 Sparks Street; Ottawa (Downtown) ON	45°25′22″N 75°41′52″W	Federal (7391)		Upload Photo
Blackburn Building	85 Sparks Street; Ottawa (Downtown) ON	45°25′24″N 75°41′50″W	Federal (4042)		More images
Boathouse	501 Rockcliffe Driveway; Ottawa ON	45°27′18″N 75°41′15″W	Federal (19615)		Upload Photo
Booth Building	165 Sparks Street; Ottawa (Downtown) ON	45°25′20″N 75°41′59″W	Federal (4058)		Upload Photo
Booth Street Complex, Surveys and Mapping Building	615 Booth Street; Ottawa (Glebe Annex) ON	45°24′03″N 75°42′18″W	Federal (10145)		More images
Bronson Company Office	150 Middle Street; Ottawa (Victoria Island) ON	45°25′13″N 75°42′51″W	Federal (4721)		Upload Photo
Brooke Claxton Building	Colombine Driveway; Ottawa (Tunney's Pasture) ON	45°24′32″N 75°44′14″W	Federal (13173)		More images
Brouse Building	181-183 Sparks Street; Ottawa (Downtown) ON	45°25′18″N 75°42′01″W	Federal (4059)		More images
Burritts Rapids Lockstation, Bridgehouse	near Burritts Rapids Lock, on an island between the Rideau River and Canal; Ottawa (Burritts Rapids) ON	44°58′50″N 75°47′47″W	Federal (4713)		Upload Photo
Bus Shelter; Vincent Massey Park	701 Heron Road; Ottawa ON	45°22′42″N 75°41′49″W	Federal (21076)		Upload Photo
ByWard Market Heritage Conservation District	St. Patrick Street, George Street, MacKenzie Avenue, Dalhousie Street; Ottawa (Byward Market) ON	45°25′44″N 75°41′35″W	Ottawa (Byward Market) municipality (8438)		More images
Canada's Four Corners Building	93 Sparks Street; Ottawa (Downtown) ON	45°25′23″N 75°41′51″W	Federal (4640)		More images
Canadian Imperial Bank of Commerce	119 Sparks Street; Ottawa (Downtown) ON	45°25′22″N 75°41′54″W	Federal (4641)		More images
Carleton County Court House	2, Daly Avenue; Ottawa (Sandy Hill) ON	45°25′30″N 75°41′20″W	Ottawa (Sandy Hill) municipality (8442)		More images
Carleton County Gaol	75, Nicholas Street; Ottawa (Sandy Hill) ON	45°25′30″N 75°41′20″W	Ottawa (Sandy Hill) municipality (8443)		More images
Carleton Place Town Hall	175, Bridge Street; Carleton Place ON	45°14′00″N 75°45′00″W	Carleton Place municipality (9810)		More images
Carpenter's Shop	Ottawa (River Ward) ON	45°23′02″N 75°42′54″W	Federal (9604)	Q24046202	More images
CBC Building	1500 Bronson Avenue; Ottawa (Confederation Heights) ON	45°22′42″N 75°41′14″W	Federal (1865)		More images
CEF, Horticulture Building, No. 74	74 Central Experimental Farm; Ottawa (River Ward) ON	45°23′27″N 75°42′23″W	Federal (4692)		More images
Central Chambers	Ottawa (Downtown Ottawa) ON	45°25′24″N 75°41′43″W	Federal (2857)	Q5060536	More images
Centretown Heritage Conservation District	south of Parliament Hill, north of Queensway corridor, and west of the Rideau Canal; Ottawa (Centretown) ON	45°24′53″N 75°41′28″W	Ottawa (Centretown) municipality (8439)		More images
Cereal Barn	Ottawa (River Ward) ON	45°23′17″N 75°42′32″W	Federal (14830)	Q24046225	More images
Cereal Crops Building	CEF campus Building 75; Ottawa ON	45°23′21″N 75°42′32″W	Federal (11056)		More images
Service Building	CEF campus Building 56; Ottawa ON	45°23′21″N 75°42′34″W	Federal (4658)		
K.W. Neatby Building	Ottawa (River Ward) ON	45°23′33″N 75°43′00″W	Federal (4673)	Q6323030	More images
Chemical Radioactive Ores Building	555 Booth Street; Ottawa (Glebe Annex) ON	45°24′08″N 75°42′22″W	Federal (9828)		Upload Photo
Commercial Building	13-15 Clarence Street; Ottawa ON	45°25′42″N 75°41′42″W	Federal (4726)		Upload Photo
Commercial Building	461-456 Sussex Drive; Ottawa ON	45°25′42″N 75°41′44″W	Federal (11408)		
Commercial Building	457-459 Sussex Drive; Ottawa (Byward Market) ON	45°25′42″N 75°41′44″W	Federal (4715)		
Confederation Building	229 Wellington Street (Downtown); Ottawa ON	45°25′19″N 75°42′10″W	Federal (3586)		More images
Confederation Square	Ottawa (Downtown) ON	45°25′26″N 75°41′44″W	Federal (12073)	Q4365607	More images
Connaught Building	550 Sussex Drive; Ottawa (Byward Market) ON	45°25′37″N 75°41′43″W	Federal (4029, (4165)		More images
Dairy Technology Annex	Building 57, Central Experimental Farm; Ottawa (River Ward) ON	45°23′02″N 75°42′54″W	Federal (4637)		More images
Defensible Lockmaster's House	at the top of the Hartwell Locks; Ottawa (River Ward) ON	45°23′02″N 75°42′00″W	Federal (11055)		More images
Store House	Hartwell Locks; Ottawa (River Ward) ON	45°23′03″N 75°42′03″W	Federal (11054)		Upload Photo
Dominion Observatory	Central Experimental Farm, bounded by Carling Avenue and Observatory Drive; Ottawa (River Ward) ON	45°23′37″N 75°42′51″W	Federal (4376)		More images
Dover Building	185-187 Sparks Street; Ottawa (Downtown) ON	45°25′18″N 75°42′01″W	Federal (4643)		More images
Drill Hall	1 Cartier Square; Ottawa ON	45°25′18″N 75°41′21″W	Federal (15942)		More images
Earnscliffe	Ottawa (Lower Town) ON	45°26′15″N 75°41′56″W	Federal (12684)	Q5326955	More images
East Memorial Building	284 Wellington Street; Ottawa (Downtown) ON	45°25′12″N 75°42′17″W	Federal (9541)		More images
EMR Complex: Fuel Testing Laboratory	562 Booth Street; Ottawa (Glebe Annex) ON	45°24′07″N 75°42′23″W	Federal (4666)		More images
Energy, Mines and Resources Complex, Ore Dressing Laboratory	552 Booth Street; Ottawa (Glebe Annex) ON	45°14′56″N 75°25′21″W	Federal (4667)		More images
Engineering Research Building	Central Experimental Farm; Ottawa (River Ward) ON	45°23′18″N 75°42′40″W	Federal (9505)		More images
First Avenue Public School	73 First Avenue; Ottawa (The Glebe) ON	45°24′22″N 75°41′07″W	Ottawa (The Glebe) municipality (10299)		More images
Forintek Building	800 Montreal Road; Ottawa (Rideau-Rockcliffe Ward) ON	45°26′39″N 75°38′02″W	Federal (4659)		Upload Photo
Former Archives Building and former War Museum	Ottawa (Lower Town) ON	45°25′50″N 75°41′55″W	Federal (3462, (13220)	Q5570166	More images
Former Geological Survey of Canada Building	Ottawa (Byward Market) ON	45°25′35″N 75°41′38″W	Federal (4649, (1142)	Q15218037	More images
Former NCC Building (demolished)	401 Lebreton Street; Ottawa (Glebe Annex) ON	45°24′01″N 75°42′09″W	Federal (4661)		Upload Photo
Former Ottawa City Hall	111 Sussex Drive; Ottawa (Green Island) ON	45°26′23″N 75°41′38″W	Federal (6629)		More images
Former U.S. Embassy	100 Wellington Street; Ottawa (Downtown) ON	45°25′24″N 75°41′54″W	Federal (15144)		More images
Fraser School House	62 John Street; Ottawa (New Edinburgh) ON	45°26′33″N 75°41′36″W	Federal (4694)		More images
Fry House	4148 Donnelly Drive; Ottawa (Burritts Rapids) ON	44°59′27″N 75°46′28″W	Ottawa (Burritts Rapids) municipality (15269)		Upload Photo
Geological Survey of Canada Building	601 Booth Street; Ottawa (Glebe Annex) ON	45°23′59″N 75°42′20″W	Federal (11135)		Upload Photo
George Sparks House	936-940 River Road; Ottawa (Manotick) ON	45°14′12″N 75°41′09″W	Federal (4630)		Upload Photo
Gilroy Farm	7406 Gilroy Road; Ottawa (Burritts Rapids) ON	44°58′09″N 75°49′43″W	Ottawa (Burritts Rapids) municipality (10300)		Upload Photo
Hangar H 11 / VIP Reception Building	Ottawa International Airport; Ottawa (Gloucester-Southgate Ward) ON	45°19′N 75°40′W	Federal (2740)		Upload Photo
Hangar H 14	Ottawa International Airport; Ottawa (Gloucester-Southgate Ward) ON	45°19′N 75°40′W	Federal (2751)		Upload Photo
Health Care Centre	Valour Drive; Ottawa (Riverview) ON	45°24′06″N 75°39′33″W	Federal (1889)		Upload Photo
Heritage House (Building 54)	Central Experimental Farm National Historic Site; Ottawa (River Ward) ON	45°23′22″N 75°42′39″W	Federal (9612)		More images
Heritage House, No. 60	Central Experimental Farm; Ottawa (River Ward) ON	45°23′25″N 75°42′31″W	Federal (4711)		More images
Hollywood Parade	103 James Street; Ottawa ON	45°24′42″N 75°41′55″W	Ontario (18640)		Upload Photo
Hope Building	61-63 Sparks Street; Ottawa (Downtown) ON	45°25′25″N 75°41′48″W	Federal (4632)		More images
Horticulture Building	Building 55, Central Experimental Farm; Ottawa (River Ward) ON	45°23′20″N 75°42′40″W	Federal (4653)		More images
Industrial Minerals and Ceramics	405 Rochester Street; Ottawa (Glebe Annex) ON	45°24′09″N 75°42′28″W	Federal (4671)		More images
Jeanne D'Arc Institute	493 Sussex Drive; Ottawa (Byward Market) ON	45°25′40″N 75°41′42″W	Federal (4647)		
John R. Booth Residence National Historic Site	252 Metcalfe Street; Ottawa (Centretown) ON	45°24′59″N 75°41′32″W	Federal (12018)		More images
Justice Building	294 Wellington Street; Ottawa (Downtown) ON	45°25′17″N 75°42′14″W	Federal (4688)		More images
La Salle Academy	373 Sussex Drive; Ottawa (Lower Town) ON	45°15′06″N 75°25′19″W	Federal (3563)		More images
Laboratory Services Building No. 22	Central Experimental Farm; Ottawa (River Ward) ON	45°23′31″N 75°43′08″W	Federal (4655)		
Langevin Block	62 Wellington Street; Ottawa (Downtown) ON	45°25′25″N 75°41′51″W	Federal (4031)		
Langevin Block National Historic Site	80 Wellington Street; Ottawa (Downtown) ON	45°25′25″N 75°41′50″W	Federal (14127)		More images
Larocque-Lafortune College	445-447 Sussex Drive; Ottawa (Byward Market) ON	45°25′43″N 75°41′45″W	Federal (4716)		More images
Laurier House	335 Laurier Avenue East; Ottawa (Sandy Hill) ON	45°25′39″N 75°40′40″W	Federal (4038, (7634)		More images
Lester B. Pearson Building	125 Sussex Drive; Ottawa ON	45°26′14″N 75°41′46″W	Federal (19637)		More images
Lindsay House	6722 Rideau Valley Drive South; Ottawa (Kars) ON	45°09′01″N 75°38′51″W	Ottawa (Kars) municipality (10302)		Upload Photo
Lisgar Collegiate Institute	29 Lisgar Street; Ottawa (Golden Triangle) ON	45°25′13″N 75°41′20″W	Ottawa (Golden Triangle) municipality (15277)		More images
Lock Office	upper end of the Ottawa Locks; Ottawa (Downtown) ON	45°25′30″N 75°41′45″W	Federal (11088)		
Lowertown West Heritage Conservation District	North of the Byward Market, south of the Ottawa River and east of the Rideau Canal; Ottawa (Lowertown) ON	45°25′59″N 75°41′38″W	Ottawa (Lowertown) municipality (8446)		More images
Machine Shop (#4)	Observatory Campus, Central Experimental Farm; Ottawa (River Ward) ON	45°23′02″N 75°42′54″W	Federal (4701)		Upload Photo
MacKay Castle	1 Sussex Drive; Ottawa (New Edinburgh) ON	45°26′41″N 75°41′29″W	Federal (4302)		More images
Main Dairy Barn	Building 88 Central Experimental Farm; Ottawa (River Ward) ON	45°23′19″N 75°42′37″W	Federal (3460)		More images
Main Greenhouse Range	Central Experimental Farm; Ottawa (River Ward) ON	45°23′25″N 75°42′43″W	Federal (4670)		More images
Maintenance Building	Major's Hill Park; Ottawa (Byward Market) ON	45°25′42″N 75°41′56″W	Federal (9947)		More images
Manotick United Church	5567 Manotick Main Street; Ottawa (Manotick) ON	45°13′27″N 75°40′57″W	Ottawa (Manotick) municipality (10308)		More images
Mansfield Building	481 Sussex Drive; Ottawa (Byward Market) ON	45°25′40″N 75°41′42″W	Federal (4645)		
Maplelawn	529 Richmond Road; Ottawa (Westboro) ON	45°23′17″N 75°45′41″W	Federal (15836)		More images
Maplelawn & Gardens National Historic Site	529 Richmond Road; Ottawa (Westboro) ON	45°23′18″N 75°45′42″W	Federal (16461)		More images
Marlborough Township Office	3048 Pierce Road; Ottawa (Malakoff) ON	45°05′30″N 75°45′26″W	Ottawa (Malakoff) municipality (10309)		Upload Photo
Marshall Building	14 Metcalfe Street; Ottawa (Downtown) ON	45°25′23″N 75°41′52″W	Federal (4718)		Upload Photo
May Building	489 Sussex Drive; Ottawa (Byward Market) ON	45°25′39″N 75°41′42″W	Federal (4648)		
Miller's Oven	1137 Mill Street; Ottawa (Manotick) ON	45°13′34″N 75°41′02″W	Ottawa (Manotick) municipality (10310)		More images
Monastère du Précieux Sang	774 Echo Drive; Ottawa (Old Ottawa South) ON	45°23′54″N 75°40′44″W	Ottawa (Old Ottawa South) municipality (10311)		Upload Photo
Mutchmor Public School	185 Fifth Avenue; Ottawa (The Glebe) ON	45°24′03″N 75°41′25″W	Ottawa (The Glebe) municipality (18490)		More images
National Arts Centre National Historic Site	53 Elgin Street; Ottawa (Downtown Ottawa) ON	45°25′25″N 75°41′36″W	Federal (9091)		More images
National Press Building	150 Wellington St. / Sparks Street; Ottawa (Downtown) ON	45°25′20″N 75°42′01″W	Federal (4690)		More images
National Research Council Canada Laboratories	100 Sussex Drive; Ottawa (Lowertown) ON	45°26′19″N 75°41′51″W	Federal (4030)		More images
National Research Council of Canada, Building M-20	1200 Montreal Road; Ottawa (Rideau-Rockcliffe Ward) ON	45°26′51″N 75°37′12″W	Federal (10794)		Upload Photo
North Gower Old Town Hall	6581 Fourth Line Road; Ottawa (North Gower) ON	45°07′58″N 75°43′04″W	Ottawa (North Gower) municipality (10312)		Upload Photo
Nutrition Building	Central Experimental Farm; Ottawa (River Ward) ON	45°23′25″N 75°42′30″W	Federal (4709)		More images
Observatory House	Central Experimental Farm; Ottawa (River Ward) ON	45°23′38″N 75°42′48″W	Federal (4704)		
Office Building	35 George Street; Ottawa (Byward Market) ON	45°25′37″N 75°41′35″W	Federal (4717)		Upload Photo
Office Building	17-19 York Street; Ottawa ON	45°25′40″N 75°41′39″W	Federal (4719)		Upload Photo
Official Guest Residence	7 Rideau Gate; Ottawa (New Edinburgh) ON	45°26′39″N 75°41′32″W	Federal (4650)		More images
Ore Dressing Laboratory (550 Booth Street)	552 Booth Street; Ottawa (Glebe Annex) ON	45°24′08″N 75°42′23″W	Federal (4665)		Upload Photo
Ottawa Electric Railway Company Steam Plant	Middle Street; Ottawa (Victoria Island) ON	45°25′11″N 75°42′58″W	Federal (4714)		Upload Photo
Ottawa Hydro Generating Station No. 2	Mill Street; Ottawa (Victoria Island) ON	45°25′09″N 75°42′49″W	Federal (4360)		More images
Parkdale Fire Station	424 Parkdale Avenue; Ottawa (Wellington Street West) ON	45°23′59″N 75°43′44″W	Ottawa (Wellington Street West) municipality (1199)		More images
Parliament Hill	Ottawa (Downtown) ON	45°25′29″N 75°41′58″W	Federal (17943, (18470)	Q1589289	More images
Centre Block	Ottawa (Downtown) ON	45°25′30″N 75°41′59″W	Federal (4675)	Q5062237	More images
East Block	Ottawa (Downtown) ON	45°25′29″N 75°41′51″W	Federal (4680)	Q5327883	More images
Library of Parliament	Ottawa (Downtown) ON	45°25′32″N 75°42′01″W	Federal (4679)	Q1125633	More images
West Block	Ottawa (Downtown) ON	45°25′24″N 75°42′02″W	Federal (4681)	Q7984482	More images
Patterson Creek Pavilion	Linden Terrace; Ottawa (The Glebe) ON	45°24′29″N 75°40′57″W	Federal (4677)		More images
Pavilion A	1495 Heron Road; Ottawa (Alta Vista) ON	45°22′52″N 75°39′10″W	Federal (13968)		Upload Photo
Pavilion B	1495 Heron Road; Ottawa (Alta Vista) ON	45°22′53″N 75°39′10″W	Federal (13043)		Upload Photo
Pavilion C at the Federal Study Centre	1495 Heron Road; Ottawa (Alta Vista) ON	45°22′53″N 75°39′10″W	Federal (15841)		Upload Photo
Pavilion D at the Federal Study Centre	1495 Heron Road; Ottawa (Alta Vista) ON	45°22′53″N 75°39′10″W	Federal (15842)		Upload Photo
Pavilion E at the Federal Study Centre	1495 Heron Road; Ottawa (Alta Vista) ON	45°22′54″N 75°39′10″W	Federal (15843)		Upload Photo
Pavilion F at the Federal Study Centre	1495 Heron Road; Ottawa (Alta Vista) ON	45°22′53″N 75°39′09″W	Federal (15844)		Upload Photo
Pavilion H at the Federal Study Centre	1495 Heron Road; Ottawa (Alta Vista) ON	45°22′53″N 75°39′09″W	Federal (15846)		Upload Photo
Pavilion I at the Federal Study Centre	1495 Heron Road; Ottawa (Alta Vista) ON	45°22′53″N 75°39′10″W	Federal (15847)		Upload Photo
Pavilion J at the Federal Study Centre	1495 Heron Road; Ottawa (Alta Vista) ON	45°22′53″N 75°39′10″W	Federal (15854)		Upload Photo
Pavilion K at the Federal Study Centre	1495 Heron Road; Ottawa (Alta Vista) ON	45°22′53″N 75°39′09″W	Federal (15855)		Upload Photo
Pavilion L at the Federal Study Centre	1495 Heron Road; Ottawa (Alta Vista) ON	45°22′53″N 75°39′09″W	Federal (15857)		Upload Photo
Photo Equatorial Building	Central Experimental Farm; Ottawa (River Ward) ON	45°23′36″N 75°42′50″W	Federal (4378)		More images
Physical Metallurgy Laboratory, Building A	568 Booth Street; Ottawa (Glebe Annex) ON	45°24′05″N 75°42′22″W	Federal (4698)		Upload Photo
Physical Metallurgy Laboratory, Building B	568 Booth Street; Ottawa (Glebe Annex) ON	45°24′05″N 75°42′22″W	Federal (4699)		Upload Photo
Physical Metallurgy Laboratory, Building C	568 Booth Street; Ottawa (Glebe Annex) ON	45°24′06″N 75°42′23″W	Federal (4702)		Upload Photo
Physical Metallurgy Laboratory, Building D	568 Booth Street; Ottawa (Glebe Annex) ON	45°24′04″N 75°42′24″W	Federal (4705)		Upload Photo
Physical Metallurgy Laboratory, Building E	568 Booth Street; Ottawa (Glebe Annex) ON	45°24′05″N 75°42′25″W	Federal (4708)		Upload Photo
Postal Station B	47-59 Sparks Street; Ottawa (Downtown) ON	45°25′25″N 75°41′47″W	Federal (16388)		More images
Potting Shed	CEF campus Building 77; Ottawa ON	45°23′17″N 75°42′35″W	Federal (11345)		Upload Photo
Prime Minister's Residence	24 Sussex Drive; Ottawa (New Edinburgh) ON	45°26′40″N 75°41′38″W	Federal (4298)		More images
Public Archives and National Library Building	395 Wellington Street; Ottawa (Downtown) ON	45°25′11″N 75°42′28″W	Federal (13053)		
Public Grounds of the Parliament Buildings National Historic Site	Wellington St; Ottawa (Downtown) ON	45°25′29″N 75°41′58″W	Federal (17422)		
Refreshment Stand	Hogs Back; Ottawa (River Ward) ON	45°22′18″N 75°41′46″W	Federal (4664)		More images
Residence	9 Rideau Gate Street; Ottawa (New Edinburgh) ON	45°26′37″N 75°41′12″W	Federal (9656)		Upload Photo
Revere Hotel	475 Sussex Drive; Ottawa (Byward Market) ON	45°25′40″N 75°41′43″W	Federal (4644)		More images
Rideau Cottage	Ottawa (New Wdinburgh) ON	45°26′37″N 75°40′58″W	Federal (4652)	Q21209442	More images
Rideau Hall and Landscaped Grounds National Historic Site	1 Sussex Drive; Ottawa (New Edinburgh) ON	45°26′41″N 75°41′30″W	Federal (7692)		
Rideau Hall, Cricket Clubhouse	1 Sussex Drive; Ottawa (New Edinburgh) ON	45°26′32″N 75°41′13″W	Federal (4662)		Upload Photo
Rideau Hall, Dairy Building	1 Sussex Drive; Ottawa (New Edinburgh) ON	45°26′38″N 75°41′13″W	Federal (4657)		Upload Photo
Rideau Hall, Gasometer	1 Sussex Drive; Ottawa (New Edinburgh) ON	45°26′39″N 75°41′13″W	Federal (4656)		
Rideau Hall, Gate Lodge	1 Sussex Drive; Ottawa (New Edinburgh) ON	45°26′41″N 75°41′30″W	Federal (4654)		
Rideau Hall, Main Gate	1 Sussex Drive; Ottawa (New Edinburgh) ON	45°26′40″N 75°41′30″W	Federal (4304)		More images
Rideau Hall, Secondary gates and fences	1 Sussex Drive; Ottawa (New Edinburgh) ON	45°26′38″N 75°41′15″W	Federal (9815)		
Rochon Residence	138 St. Patrick Street; Ottawa (Byward Market) ON	45°25′45″N 75°41′47″W	Federal (4720)		More images
Rockcliffe Pavilion	Rockcliffe Parkway; Ottawa (Rockcliffe Park) ON	45°26′38″N 75°41′13″W	Federal (4674)		Upload Photo
Royal Canadian Mint	320 Sussex Drive; Ottawa (Lowertown) ON	45°26′04″N 75°41′57″W	Federal (9212, (3339)		More images
Royal Canadian Mounted Police Headquarters Building	1200 Vanier Parkway; Ottawa (Overbrook) ON	45°25′10″N 75°39′33″W	Federal (4706)		Upload Photo
Sandy Hill West Heritage Conservation District	east of the Rideau canal, south of the Byward Market and north of the University of Ottawa; Ottawa (Sandy Hill) ON	45°25′35″N 75°41′13″W	Ottawa (Sandy Hill) municipality (8462)		More images
Saxe Building	75 Sparks Street; Ottawa (Downtown) ON	45°25′25″N 75°41′48″W	Federal (4635)		More images
Scottish Ontario Chambers	42-50 Sparks Street; Ottawa (Downtown) ON	45°25′25″N 75°41′45″W	Federal (4623)		More images
Seismology Survey Building	Central Experimental Farm National Historic Site; Ottawa (River Ward) ON	45°23′38″N 75°42′54″W	Federal (4700)		More images
Geophysical Laboratory 3	Building No. 3 at Central Experimental Farm National Historic Site; Ottawa (River Ward) ON		Federal (4703)		Upload Photo
Silver Springs Farm, Barn	3502 Richmond Road; Ottawa (College Ward) ON	45°20′02″N 75°48′54″W	Federal (4325)		More images
Silver Springs Farm, House	3501 Richmond Road; Ottawa (College Ward) ON	45°20′02″N 75°48′53″W	Federal (11516)		More images
Sir Charles Tupper Building	2250 Riverside Drive; Ottawa (Billings Bridge) ON	45°22′31″N 75°41′34″W	Federal (7660)		More images
Sir John Carling Building	930 Carling Avenue; Ottawa (River Ward) ON	45°23′38″N 75°42′40″W	Federal (4263)		More images
Sir Leonard Tilley Building	719 Heron Road; Ottawa (Confederation Heights) ON	45°22′N 75°41′W	Federal (2898)		
Slater Building	177-179 Sparks Street; Ottawa (Downtown) ON	45°25′19″N 75°42′01″W	Federal (4642)		More images
Small Dairy Barn	Building 95, Central Experimental Farm; Ottawa (River Ward) ON	45°23′16″N 75°42′42″W	Federal (9946)		More images
South Azimuth Building	Central Experimental Farm National Historic Site; Ottawa (River Ward) ON	45°23′36″N 75°42′53″W	Federal (4377)		More images
Sparrow Building	489 Sussex Drive; Ottawa (Byward Market) ON	45°25′41″N 75°41′43″W	Federal (4646)		Upload Photo
St. Louis House	1579 Washington Street; Ottawa (Kars) ON	45°09′02″N 75°38′48″W	Ottawa (Kars) municipality (13341)		Upload Photo
Stable / Garage Recognized Federal Heritage Building	1 Sussex Drive; Ottawa (New Edinburgh) ON	45°26′N 75°41′W	Federal (2734)		Upload Photo
Stornoway	541 Acacia Drive; Ottawa (Rockcliffe Park) ON	45°27′10″N 75°40′44″W	Federal (4651)		More images
Supreme Court of Canada Building	301 Wellington Street; Ottawa (Downtown) ON	45°25′19″N 75°42′20″W	Federal (3564)		More images
Swine Showcase Building No. 91	Central Experimental Farm National Historic Site; Ottawa (River Ward) ON	45°23′16″N 75°42′36″W	Federal (9601)		
The Albion Hotel	1 Daly Ave. Ottawa (Sandy Hill) ON	45°25′32″N 75°41′22″W	Ottawa (Sandy Hill) municipality (17482)		
The Canada Goose Shop	5538 Manotick Main Street; Ottawa (Manotick) ON	45°13′31″N 75°41′04″W	Ottawa (Manotick) municipality (10297)		Upload Photo
The City Registry Office	70 Nicholas Street; Ottawa (Sandy Hill) ON	45°25′30″N 75°41′21″W	Ottawa (Sandy Hill) municipality (8463)		More images
The Eastman House	6727 Lord Nelson Street; Ottawa (Kars) ON	45°09′00″N 75°38′47″W	Ottawa (Kars) municipality (15224)		Upload Photo
The Grey Nuns Mother House	9 Bruyere Street; Ottawa (Lowertown) ON	45°25′53″N 75°41′52″W	Ottawa (Lowertown) municipality (15271)		
The Horticulture Building	957 Bank Street; Ottawa (The Glebe) ON	45°23′59″N 75°41′11″W	Ottawa (The Glebe) municipality (8445)		More images
The McCulla House	2944 Pierce Road; Ottawa (Pierces Corners) ON	45°05′46″N 75°44′59″W	Ottawa (Pierces Corners) municipality (14206)		Upload Photo
The McFadden House	5561 Manotick Main Street; Ottawa (Manotick) ON	45°13′28″N 75°40′58″W	Ottawa (Manotick) municipality (15276)		More images
The Old Presbyterian Manse	1130 O'Grady Street; Ottawa (Manotick) ON	45°13′31″N 75°40′55″W	Ottawa (Manotick) municipality (17481)		
Powell House	Ridge Road; Ottawa (Gloucester) ON	45°23′35″N 75°33′24″W	Federal (4152)		Upload Photo
The Powell House	85 Glebe Ave. Ottawa (The Glebe) ON	45°24′21″N 75°41′16″W	Ottawa (The Glebe) municipality (15267)		More images
The Pritchard House	5559 Manotick Main Street; Ottawa (Manotick) ON	45°13′28″N 75°40′59″W	Ottawa (Manotick) municipality (15273)		More images
The Thomas Craig House	6607 Fourth Line Road; Ottawa (North Gower) ON	45°07′53″N 75°42′58″W	Ottawa (North Gower) municipality (14207)		Upload Photo
The Williams House	1126 John Street; Ottawa (Manotick) ON	45°13′31″N 75°40′55″W	Ottawa (Manotick) municipality (14204)		More images
Toller House	229 Chapel Street; Ottawa (Sandy Hill) ON	45°25′45″N 75°40′47″W	Ottawa (Sandy Hill) municipality (17581)		More images
Union Bank Building	128 Wellington Street; Ottawa ON	45°25′22″N 75°41′58″W	Federal (4267)		Upload Photo
Union Mission	47-49 Daly Ave. Ottawa (Sandy Hill) ON	45°25′35″N 75°41′15″W	Ottawa (Sandy Hill) municipality (18641)		More images
Valade Residence	142-44 St. Patrick Street; Ottawa (Byward Market) ON	45°25′46″N 75°41′45″W	Federal (4729)		More images
VIA Rail Station	200 Tremblay Road; Ottawa (Eastway Gardens) ON	45°24′58″N 75°39′07″W	Federal (15815)		More images
Victoria Building	140 Wellington Street; Ottawa (Downtown) ON	45°25′22″N 75°41′58″W	Federal (4687)		More images
Wellington Building	180 Wellington St. / Sparks; Ottawa (Downtown) ON	45°25′18″N 75°42′03″W	Federal (3458)		More images
West Memorial Building	344 Wellington Street; Ottawa (Downtown) ON	45°25′10″N 75°42′24″W	Federal (4374)		
Wilbrod Street Heritage Conservation District	a few blocks within Sandy Hill East, west of the Rideau River and south of Lowertown in Ottawa; Ottawa (Sandy Hill) ON	45°25′46″N 75°40′31″W	Ottawa (Sandy Hill) municipality (8464)		More images
William Saunders Building	Building 49, Central Experimental Farm; Ottawa (River Ward) ON	45°23′28″N 75°42′39″W	Federal (4676)		More images
Willson Carbide Mill	1 Victoria Island; Ottawa (Victoria Island) ON	45°25′18″N 75°42′44″W	Federal (4634)		More images
Burritt House	4390 Donnelly Drive; Ottawa (Burritts Rapids) ON	44°59′03″N 75°47′44″W	Ottawa (Burritts Rapids) municipality (10278)		Upload Photo
The (James) Lindsay House	6836 Rideau Valley Drive South; Ottawa (Kars) ON	45°08′45″N 75°38′47″W	Ottawa (Kars) municipality (13342)		Upload Photo
Rockcliffe Park Heritage Conservation District	east of Ottawa centre within an elbow of the Ottawa River; Ottawa (Rockliffe Park) ON	45°27′N 75°41′W	Ottawa (Rockliffe Park) municipality (8460)		
5 Blackburn Avenue	5 Blackburn Avenue; Ottawa (Sandy Hill) ON	45°25′40″N 75°40′38″W	Ontario (17801), Ottawa (Sandy Hill) municipality (19829)		More images

== See also ==
- List of designated heritage properties in Ottawa
