= Ottawa Civic Hospital =

- The Ottawa Hospital
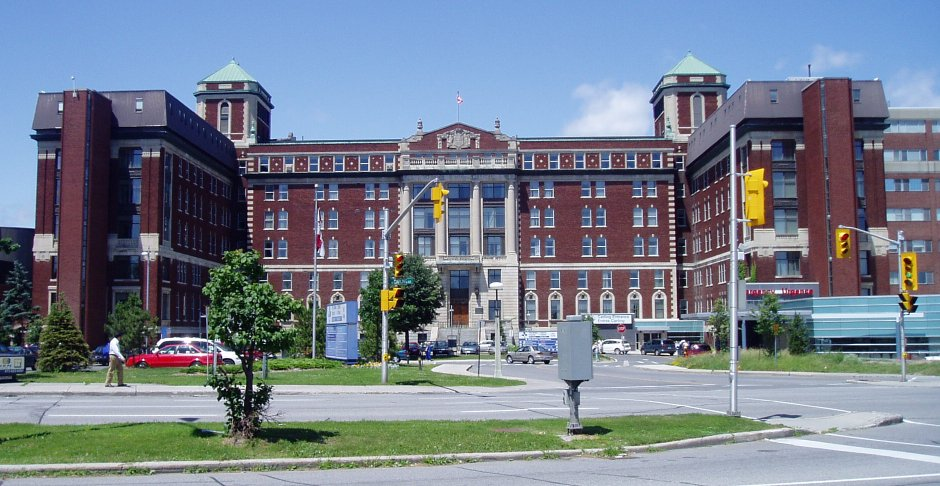

Geography
- Location: 1053 Carling Avenue; Ottawa, Ontario; K1Y 4E9
- Coordinates: 45°23′34″N 75°43′16″W

Organisation
- Care system: Medicare
- Type: Teaching, District General
- Affiliated university: University of Ottawa

Services
- Emergency department: Yes, Regional Trauma Centre
- Beds: 549

The Ottawa Civic Hospital is one of three main campuses of The Ottawa Hospital – along with the General and Riverside campuses. With 549 beds (including the Heart Institute), the Civic Campus has the region's only adult-care trauma centre, serving Eastern Ontario, the Outaouais region of Quebec and eastern Nunavut. The Civic Campus also houses the University of Ottawa Heart Institute, which provides cardiac care for patients at The Ottawa Hospital. The Civic Campus opened in 1924 and is located at 1053 Carling Avenue in Ottawa, Ontario, Canada.

== History ==
The hospital was championed largely by Harold Fisher following the 1918 flu pandemic. While the facility is today located in an urban location, Fisher faced ridicule at the time for advocating for a location in the then-countryside and the project was branded by some as "Fisher's Folly".

- 1924 – The Ottawa Civic Hospital opened with 550 beds. It was built to replace three aging hospitals: the Carleton County Protestant General Hospital on Rideau Street (now Wallis House), which dated from the 1870s, as well as Ottawa Maternity and St. Luke's hospitals. In 1921, the construction of the Civic hospital was estimated to cost $1,500,000.
- 1929 – The Depression increased the number of patients who couldn't pay for care and major outbreaks of scarlet fever, diphtheria and tuberculosis affected health-care workers.
- 1930 – A staff immunization program reduced the severity of the outbreaks.
- January 19, 1943 – During World War II, when Canada provided refuge to the Dutch royal family, then-Princess Juliana gave birth to her daughter Princess Margriet in Ottawa at the Ottawa Civic Hospital. The hospital's maternity ward was temporarily declared to be extraterritorial so that Margriet would inherit only Dutch citizenship from her mother.
- 1950s – A number of expansions maintained the Civic's position at the forefront of medicine in Ottawa.
- 1966 – The first successful kidney transplant in Ottawa was performed.
- 1976 – The University of Ottawa Heart Institute opened. The Heart Institute is Canada's largest and foremost heart health centre dedicated to understanding, treating and preventing heart disease. It is Canada's only complete cardiac centre.
- 1982 – The Rich Little Special Care Nursery opened. The nursery provides enhanced level II care for premature infants and for term infants with health problems.
- 1988 – The Loeb Research Institute opened.
- April 1, 1998 – The Civic, General and Riverside hospitals amalgamated to form The Ottawa Hospital.
- 2006 – A CA$10 million expansion to the Civic Campus Emergency Department was completed.
- 2013 – The Ontario Government announced a $200-million expansion of the Heart Institute.
- 2016 – The Sir John Carling Building site was selected as the future home of the new Civic Campus, with expected completion in 10 years.

== Services and programs ==
The Civic Campus is the region's only adult-care trauma centre, treating the most critical health needs. It is the regional centre for cardiac and stroke care, treating patients from eastern Ontario, western Quebec and eastern Nunavut. Between April 2013 and March 2016, the Civic Campus had 6,595 visits from Nunavut patients. The University of Ottawa Skills and Simulation Centre – the largest centre in Canada and one of the largest in North America – is also located at the Civic Campus. The Regional Geriatric Program of Eastern Ontario, Breast Health Centre and Bariatric Centre of Excellence are all based at the Civic Campus.
