= Maplelawn =

Coordinates: 45.388246°N 75.761955°W

Maplelawn & Gardens
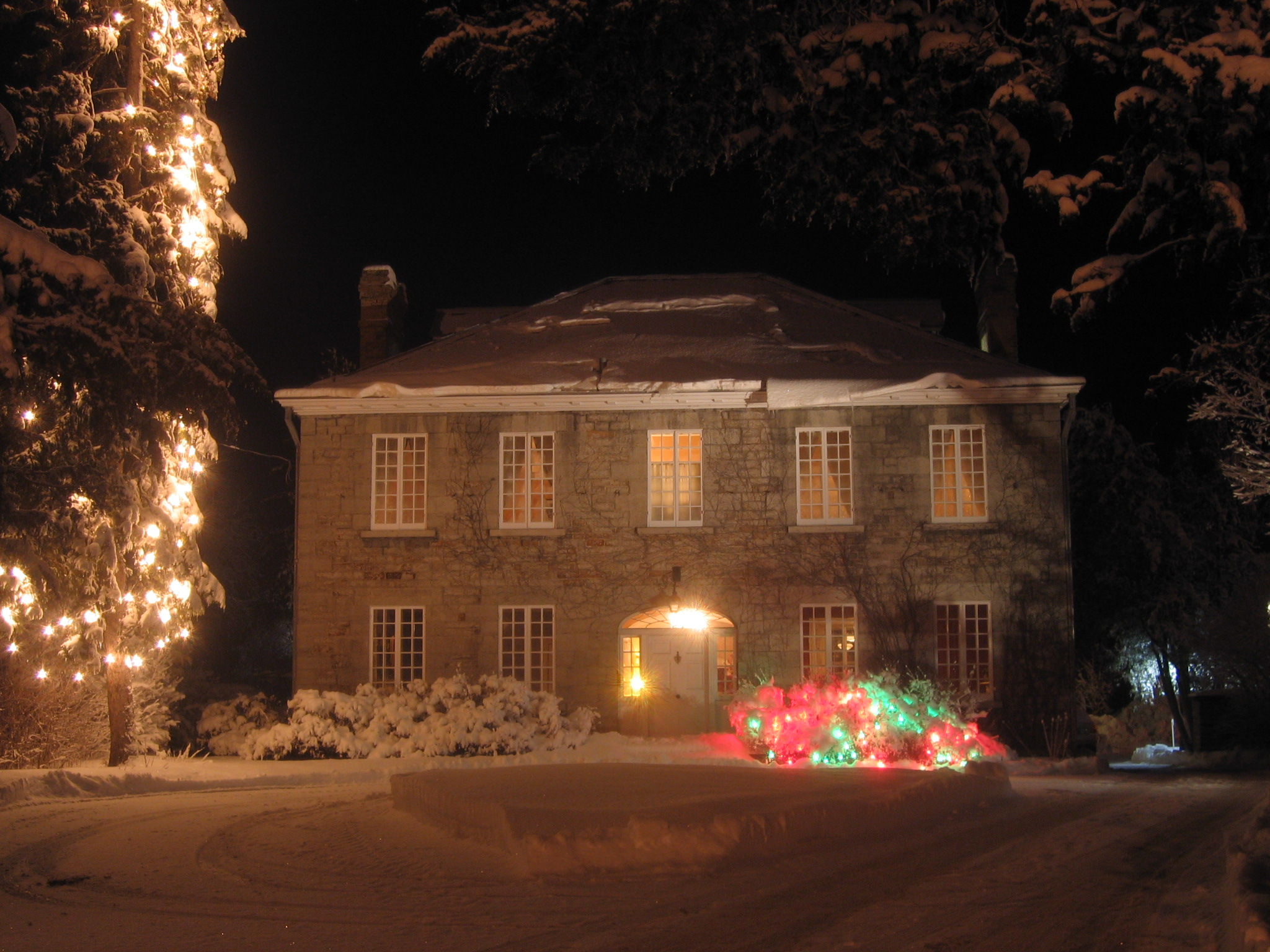
- Maplelawn in winter 2006
- Location: Ontario, Canada
- Nearest city: Ottawa
- Built: 1834
- Original use: Residence and walled garden
- Current use: Restaurant
- Governing body: National Capital Commission

National Historic Site of Canada
- Designated: 1989

Maplelawn is an historic house and former estate located in Ottawa, Ontario, Canada. The house was built between 1831 and 1834 as the centre of a farming estate by the Thomson family. In 1877 the Cole family bought the estate and lived there until 1989. The house is now owned by the National Capital Commission and it is a designated national historic site. It is particularly noted for the well preserved and rare walled garden next to the house, The Maplelawn Garden. Since 1999 the Maplelawn has been the location of the Keg Manor restaurant. Today the house is located in Westboro at 529 Richmond Road.

The architecture of the house reflects a taste for British classicism, but some elements, such as the windows, are in a more local style that was favoured in Quebec and the Ottawa Valley. The walled garden is a very rare feature for a Canadian farming estate. Although highly prized in Europe, they were never widespread in Canada. It was intended to be both ornamental and useful.

== History ==
Around 1818, William Thomson, a gentleman of Scottish origin, retired from the British army and settled the 200-acre (0.81 km^{2}) farm on the road leading from Bytown to the village of Richmond. Thomson and his sons focused on the farming operations of their estate, but also invested peripherally in the lumber trade.

In 1877, the Thomsons sold the farm to the Thomas Cole, who had made a fortune in the lumber industry. The Cole family and their descendants retained possession of the house until the death of Frances Rochester, the granddaughter of Thomas Cole in 1989. Frances and her husband, Lloyd Rochester, lived at Maplelawn and raised their children there (the Rochesters were another old Ottawa family). The most important renovation was conducted in 1936, when the original summer kitchen and field hands' dormitory was replaced by a stone addition to the house at the rear. Meanwhile, the garden was redesigned by a horticulturalist from the Central Experimental Farm. The Federal District Commission, the forerunner of the NCC, had bought the house in the 1950s to ensure its preservation.

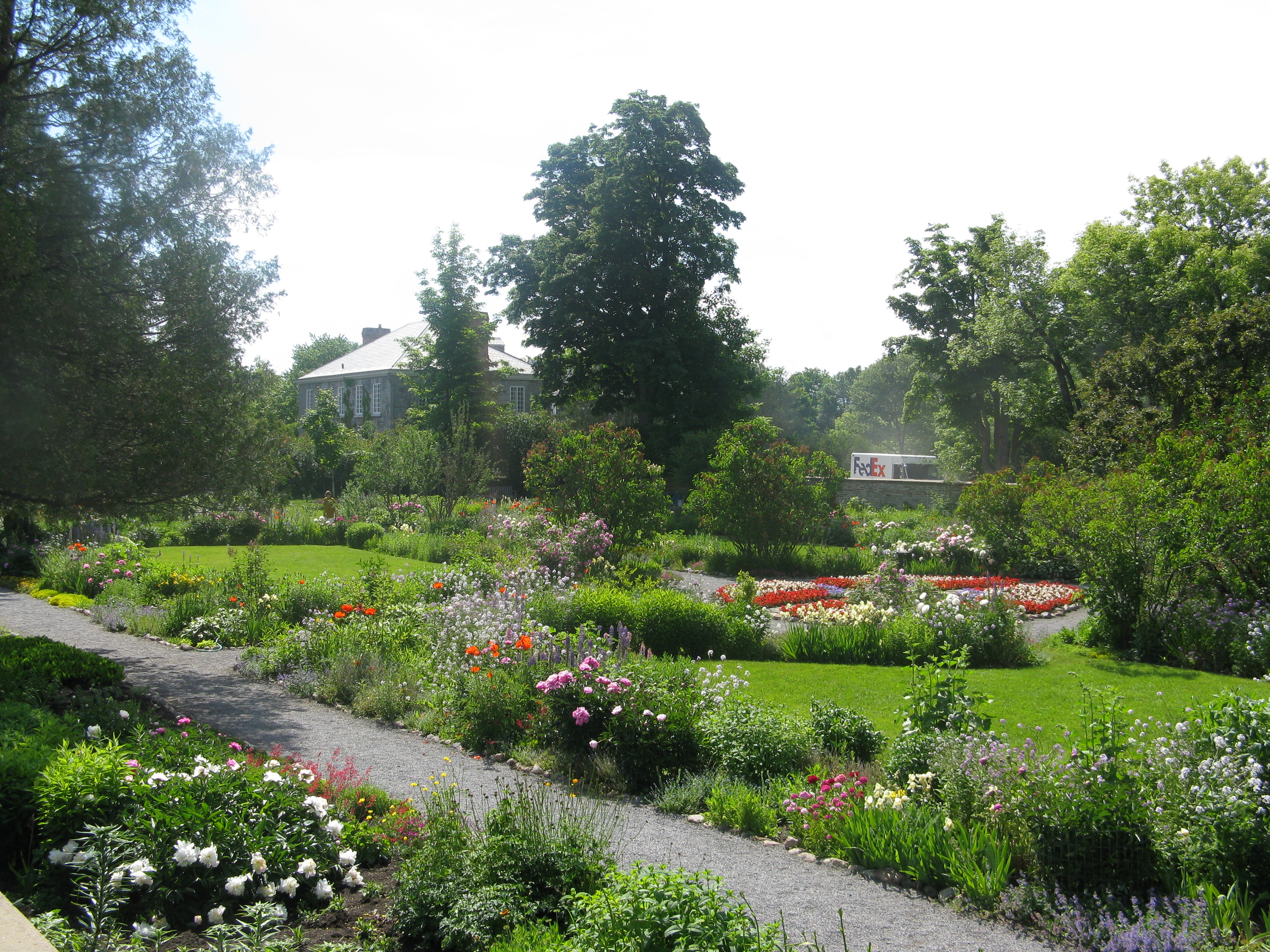
A rare instance of a European-style walled garden in Canada, dating back to the 1830s.

The property was designated a National Historic Site of Canada in 1989.

For some years, the house remained empty, and the garden began to deteriorate, but in 1993, the Friends of Maplelawn Garden, a volunteer group, began to work on the garden. The NCC renovated the building. Shortly thereafter, Peter Fallis leased the property and conducted a massive renovation, both internally and externally. Fallis invested greatly in transforming the interior of the building from a single-family residence, with servant's quarters, into a beautiful restaurant.

The new restaurant converted the 1933 addition at the back of the building into a bar and sitting (waiting) area for guests. The bar had an impressive bar wood and a large fireplace that welcomed visitors to warm themselves in the winter and housed bouquets constructed from donations from the walled garden (The Friends of Maplelawn) in the warmer months. The western side of the addition housed French doors that led to a large flagstone patio and outdoor reception area. The patios and reception areas were extensively renovated by a landscape architect, who, with the help of theiteam, did an outstanding job.

In the front of the house, on the main floor, there were two dining rooms, both with fireplaces, that shared an elegant design that ran throughout the remainder of the house. All of the dining rooms had some two-person tables and those that could convert from square four-person tables to six-person round tables, which was quite a unique design at the time. All of the tables had Chippendale chairs (a variety were purchased both with and without arms and all with beautiful fabric seats).

There is an impressive main entrance at the front of the house, but it was not used during the operation of the restaurant. The main entrance was situated to the rear of the building off of the newly constructed parking lot. There were sparkling beautiful chandeliers in each room and in the hallways as well. In addition, a local artisan produced wall sconces that provided additional lighting to all of the dining rooms on both levels of the restaurant. All of the rooms in the house had deep-set (because of the thick stone walls) casement windows. They have been outstanding, and their sills offered great locations for floral arrangements and candlelight in all of the dining areas and the bar. For access the upper dining areas, there was a main, curving staircase. The staircase had an amazing ornate mural (painted by Peter Langlois and Dana Wardrop http://www.applieddesigns.ca/about.htm) painted on the curved wall that led visitors to the equally stunning second storey.

The second level housed two dining rooms (one large and one small) as well as a unique, one-person washroom. This bathroom also had murals painted on its walls, but the focal point of the room was the original bathtub that was being used as a planter. There were several tropical and flowering plants in the bathtub (which was filled with earth) to the point that being in the washroom made feel as in a garden oasis, which was somewhat of an homage to the walled Victorian garden.

Also unique to the restaurant was that the kitchen was created on the second level of the house. The kitchen was fantastic to work in as it had rows of windows that allowed sunlight to fill the kitchen making for a very cheery work environment. Initially, the hope was to send the food down to the main level on an automated dumbwaiter that landed in the bar area. Unfortunately, the idea proved to be less efficient than expected and the device that was designed and built at great cost was never used for that purpose. The restaurant reverted to using person-power to run the food down the stairs on large oval trays.

Unfortunately, the Maplelawn Cafe did not survive long enough to allow it to become the outstanding restaurant that it should have been. Instead, several setbacks (including the 1998 ice storm that affected all of Eastern Ontario and Western Quebec), forced the restaurant into bankruptcy. The NCC benefitted greatly from the leasehold improvements made to the house by Peter Fallis. The conversion of the property from a residence to a restaurant allowed them to lease it to another restaurant that needed to do very little in the way of improvements. In the late 1990s, a couple of different businessmen took over the lease and created a franchise of The Keg restaurant, to be called the "Keg Manor" in the house.

== See also ==
- List of designated heritage properties in Ottawa

== Sources ==
Maitland, Leslie and Louis Taylor. Historical Sketches of Ottawa. Peterborough, Broadview Press, 1990.

Friends of Maplelawn Garden
