= Keg Mansion =

Restaurant and historic house in Toronto, Canada

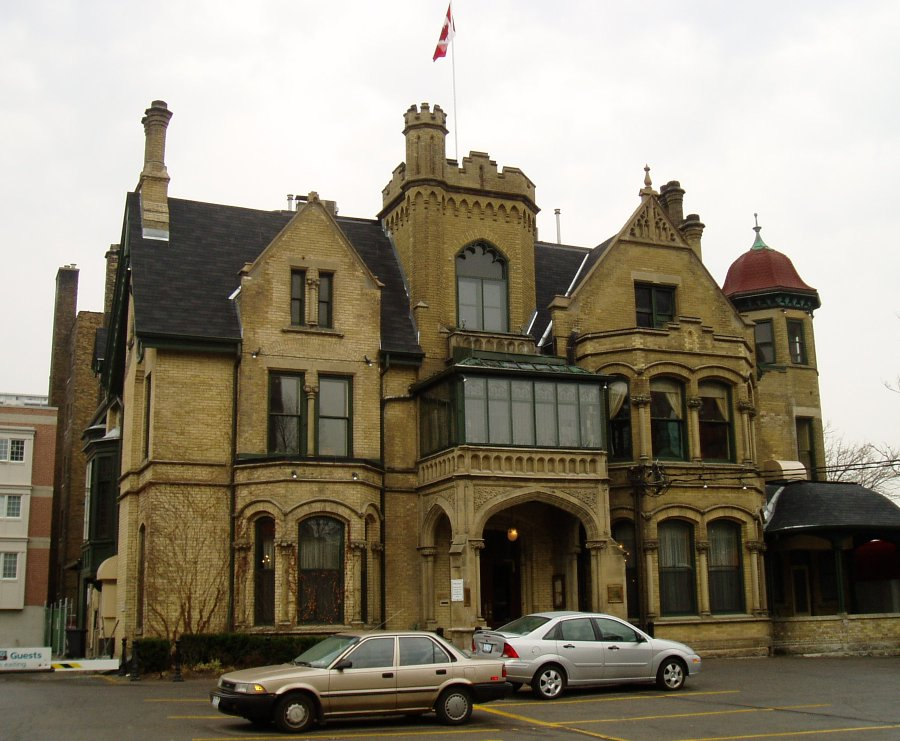
- The building seen in 2005
- Interactive map of the Keg Mansion area

General information
- Architectural style: Gothic Revival
- Location: 515 Jarvis Street, Toronto, Ontario
- Coordinates: 43.666832°N 79.377943°W
- Current tenants: The Keg
- Completed: 1868

Design and construction
- Architect: William Young

Website
- thekeg.com/en/locations/mansion

Ontario Heritage Act
- Type: Designated heritage property (Part IV)
- Designated: November 12, 1975

The Keg Mansion is a historic house in Toronto, Ontario that is presently used a location by The Keg restaurant chain. The building was initially known as Euclid Hall.

The building was originally built in 1868 for Arthur McMaster, nephew of Canadian senator and banker, William McMaster. In 1915, the building was bequeathed by the Massey family to Victoria College, a federated college of the University of Toronto. In 1976, The Keg repurposed the building to serve as a restaurant.

== History ==
The house was originally built in 1868 by Arthur McMaster, nephew of the prominent businessman William McMaster. At the time, Jarvis Street was one of the wealthiest parts of Toronto and the street was lined by large manors. The house was set back from the street and surrounded by large gardens.

The former house has a neutral colour palette with green brass accents over the windows and red shingles on the turret. The hall uses soft, deep colours to contrast hard, crisp edges. As a residence, it consisted of twenty-six rooms and seventeen fireplaces with a stable and large brick carriage house in the back. With significant alterations to the interior having been made since its era as a dwelling, the interior is now significantly different from the original.

In 1882, it was purchased by Hart Massey and his wife, who had just returned to Toronto from Cleveland. The Masseys renovated the house and added a turret, verandah, and greenhouse, but the original Gothic façade was not significantly altered. Hart Massey's sons bought homes surrounding the manor. To the north, his son Chester D. Massey built the home where Hart's grandchildren Vincent and Raymond were raised.

As the area became more urban and various commercial operations moved into the area, the Masseys decided to leave. The building was then bequeathed to the University of Toronto's Victoria College in 1915. The manor served as the first home of Toronto radio station CFRB in the 1920s and was home to an art gallery for several decades until 1960. It later was bought by Jules Fine, and became a restaurant named Julie's Mansion, with the Bombay Bicycle Club existing on the top floor. After Fine suffered a stroke, the grounds were sold off, and the greenhouses were demolished and replaced with a service station. In 1976, it became home to a The Keg restaurant, and it was renamed the Keg Mansion.

In September 2015, almost two dozen animal rights activists and vegans gathered at the Keg Mansion to protest animal cruelty.

== See also ==
- List of oldest buildings and structures in Toronto
