= The Keg =

Canadian steakhouse restaurant chain

The Keg Steakhouse and Bar

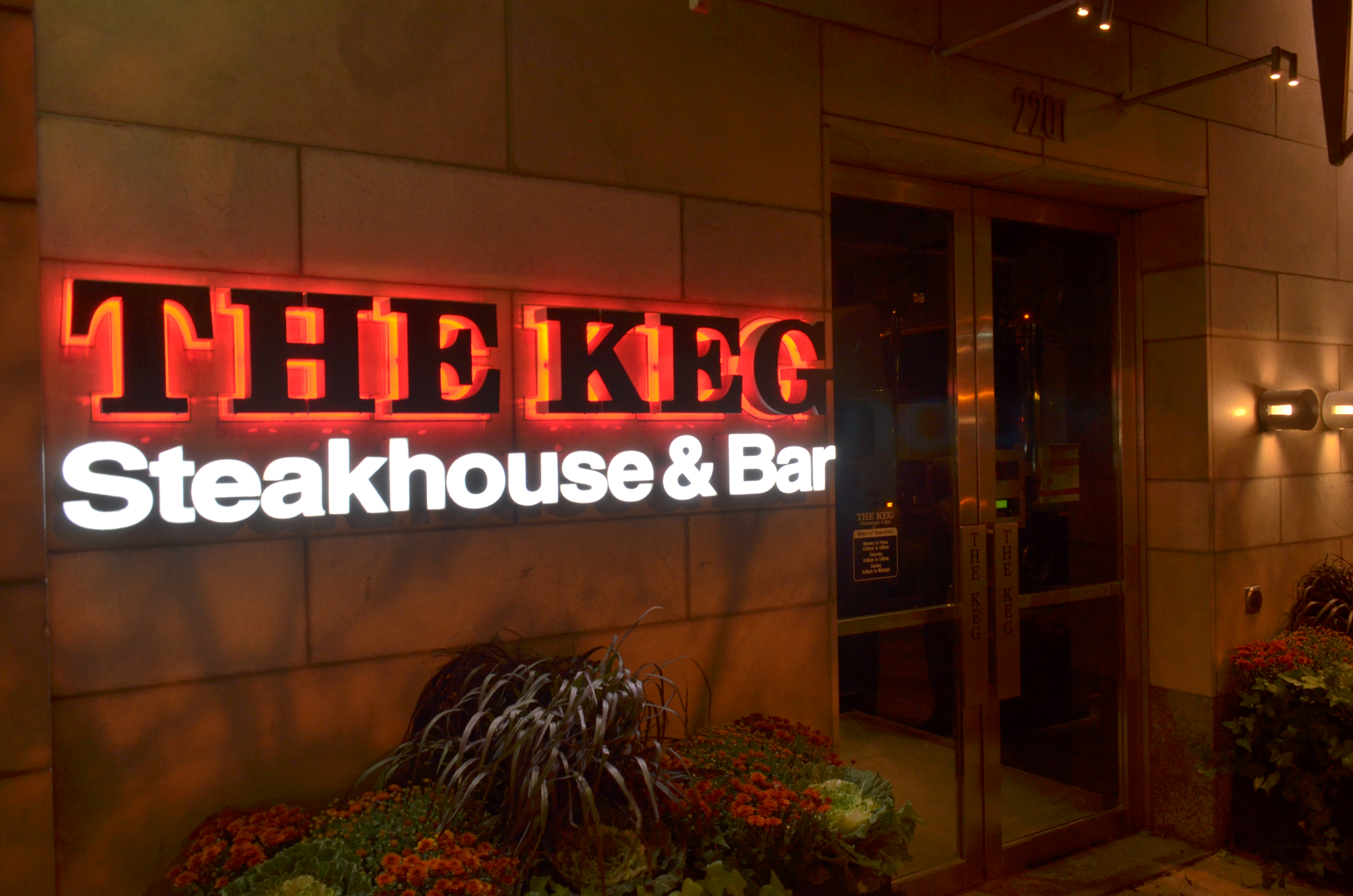
- The Keg at Yonge and Eglinton in Toronto.
- Formerly: The Keg 'n Cleaver
- Company type: Subsidiary
- Industry: Restaurants
- Founded: 1971; 55 years ago, in North Vancouver, British Columbia
- Founder: George Tidball
- Headquarters: Richmond, British Columbia, Canada
- Number of locations: 105 (January 2026)
- Areas served: Canada; United States
- Key people: Nick Dean (President) | Richard Jaffray (Executive Chairman)
- Products: steak, prime rib, seafood
- Parent: Fairfax Financial Holdings Limited
- Website: thekeg.com

Keg Restaurants Limited, operating as The Keg Steakhouse and Bar, is a Canadian chain of steakhouse restaurants and bars operating in Canada and the United States. The company was founded in 1971 by George Tidball in North Vancouver, British Columbia, originally under the name "The Keg 'n Cleaver".

In February 2018, Recipe Unlimited completed the acquisition of The Keg for approximately $200 million. The Keg was spun off from Recipe Unlimited in 2025 as a separate company, although still owned by Recipe Unlimited's parent company Fairfax Financial.

== History ==
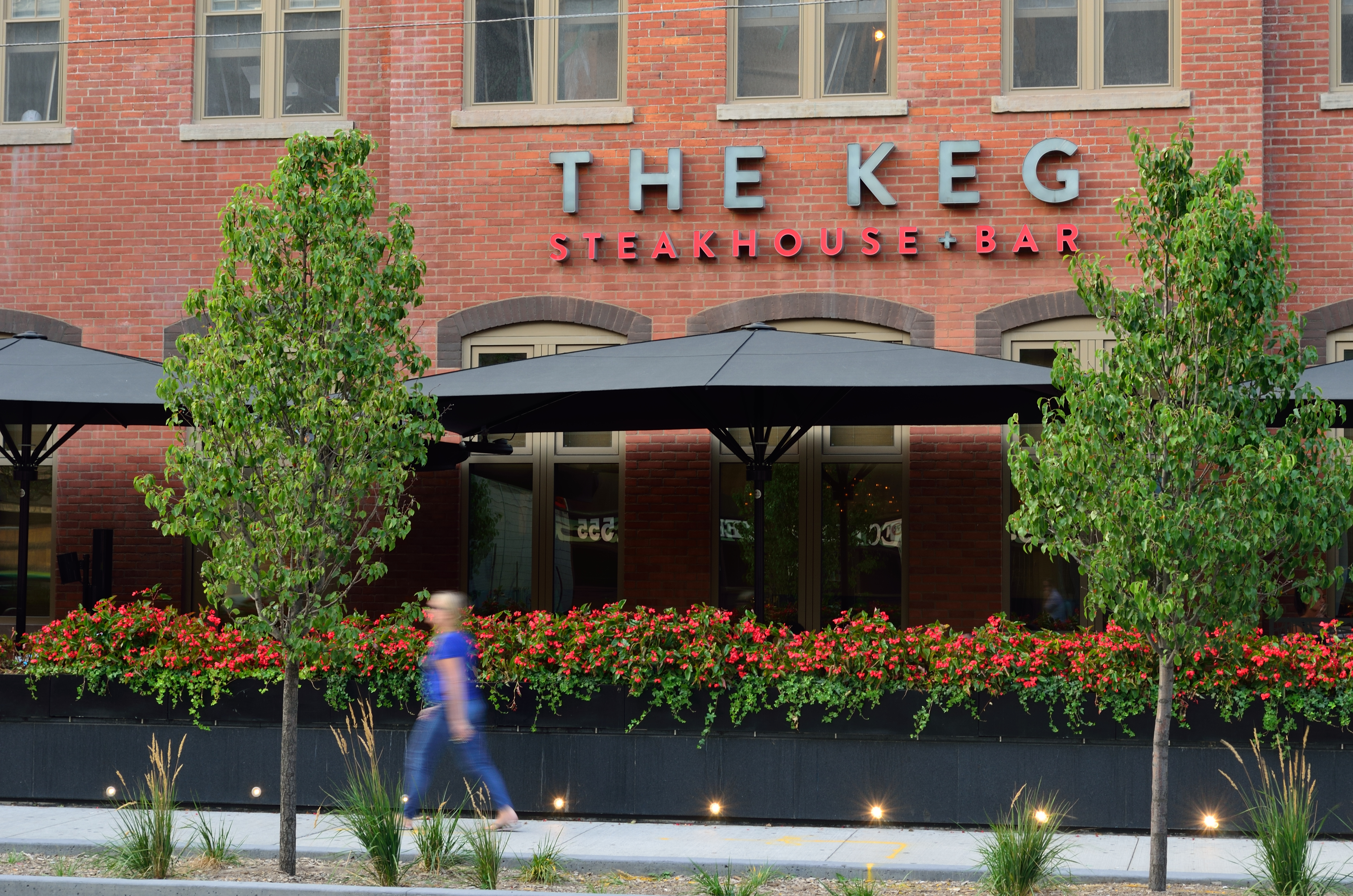
The Keg on King Street West in Downtown Toronto's Fashion District

The company was founded in 1971 in North Vancouver, British Columbia, as The Keg 'n Cleaver by George Tidball at a small downstairs location in a former industrial building in the Moodyville area of lower Lonsdale. It operates in nine Canadian provinces (excluding only Prince Edward Island) and four American states.

Several locations operate in repurposed historic buildings, such as the Keg Mansion in Toronto and the Keg Manor at the Maplelawn Estate in Ottawa. The Downtown Winnipeg location opened in 1975 as The Keg and Cleaver in the former Hudson's Bay Company Garage on Garry Street, where it still operates today. Other notable heritage restorations were the Keg in Kamloops, British Columbia, which was a CN Station, and the location in New Westminster, British Columbia, formerly the city's Canadian Pacific Railway station. The Old Strathcona location was restored and opened in Edmonton, Alberta, three years after Tidball had opened the first Keg. It was originally built in 1912 as the Scona Apartments and Scona Garage, one of the earliest automobile sales and service locations in that city. Since then, this location has closed.

Tidball died in 2014.

== Operations ==
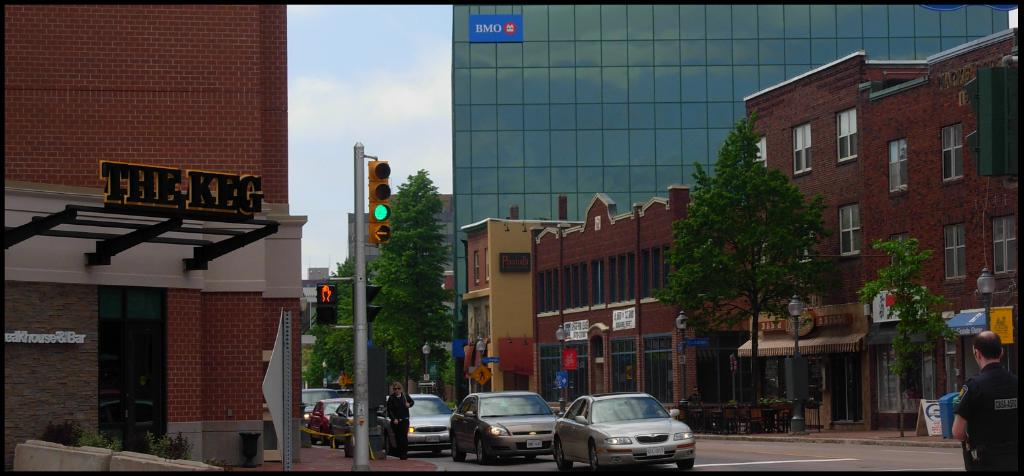
The 100th location of The Keg was built in Moncton, New Brunswick in 2007

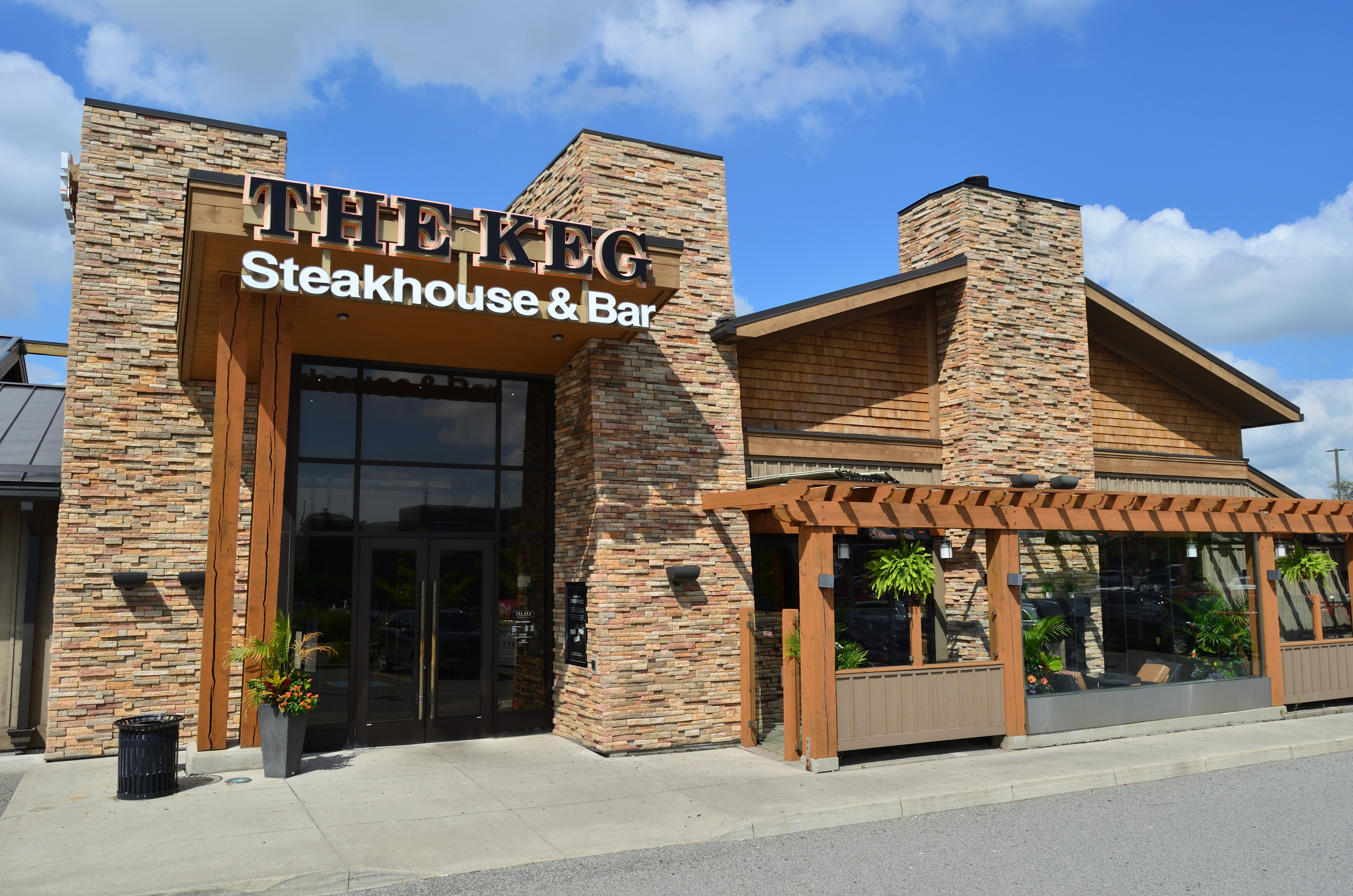
The Keg in Richmond Hill, Ontario

The Keg's financial and physical operations had been managed by David Aisenstat for a number of years. The restaurants operated as Keg Restaurants Ltd. (KRL), with Aisenstat involved in selling to the British firm Whitbread PLC in 1987. In 1997, Aisenstat arranged financing and purchased KRL back from Whitbread.

In 2002, KRL created the Keg Royalties Income Fund, sold through a public offering on the Toronto Stock Exchange, trading as TSX: KEG.UN. The Fund owns the trademarks and intellectual property of "The Keg" and receives an annual royalty of 4% of gross sales for restaurant locations in the Royalty Pool. KRL kept a 99-year license to use the name "The Keg"; it also provided management services to The Keg Royalties Income Fund at no cost as part of its long-term royalty and licensing agreement. The Fund's creation presented the first opportunity for the public to trade in any portion of the Keg group of companies, which were previously fully private.

On February 4, 2014, Aisenstat sold 51% of his private holdings in The Keg to Fairfax Financial, a publicly traded Canadian holding company.

On January 23, 2018, it was announced that Cara Operations was purchasing KRL for $200 million. The deal closed in February 2018, with Fairfax Financial and David Aisenstat sharing $105 million plus 3.8 million Cara subordinate voting shares. Aisenstat joined Cara's board of directors and assumed executive oversight of the higher-end brands within the 19 restaurant chains then held by Cara. Cara also announced that the acquisition had prompted the company to change its own name, confirming on May 10, 2018, that it would be renamed Recipe Unlimited Corporation.

In July 2019 Nick Dean became President of The Keg. Nick Dean is the former CEO of KBS Canada – a previous advertising agency for The Keg.

In August 2025, Fairfax Financial completed the acquisition of all issued and outstanding units of the Keg Royalties Income Fund for $18.60 per unit. Following the completion of the transaction, the Fund's units were delisted from the Toronto Stock Exchange on August 12, 2025.

On September 16, 2025, The Keg split from Recipe Unlimited and returned to be a standalone company, still a part of Fairfax. Richard Jaffray and his company, LFG Growth Partners, have acquired a significant equity position in The Keg. The new board will be led by Jaffray as the executive chairman, and Nick Dean remains the President of The Keg.

== See also ==
- List of Canadian restaurant chains
