= Richard Cotsman Wright =

Canadian architect

- Born: 1860; London, Ontario
- Died: 1927 (aged 66–67); Ottawa, Ontario
- Occupation: Architect
- Practice: Chief Dominion Architect
- Buildings: Confederation Building (Ottawa)

Richard Cotsman Wright (1860–1921) was a Canadian architect who served as Chief Dominion Architect from 1918–1927. As chief government architect he was responsible for many of the federal buildings constructed in this period. He embraced Chateauesque architecture and the Collegiate Gothic architecture.

== Career ==
He was born in London, Ontario on 5 January 1860. He was educated in London, Ontario. He received private tutoring as an architect and construction engineer. He articled with Tracy & Durand, in London, Ontario from 1877 to 1881. He spent from 1881–1896 working as an assistant in New York to Richard M. Hunt, Bruce Price, and Charles C. Haight. He became an associate of Clarence S. Luce, in New York.

In 1906, he became Assistant Chief Architect in the Department of Public Works in Ottawa, Ontario. He serving directly under David Ewart, then Chief Dominion Architect. In June 1914 he retired to work in the private sector. In October 1915, he returned to his post as Assistant Chief Architect in the Department of Public Works in Ottawa, Ontario. In early 1918 he succeeded Edgar Lewis Horwood as Chief Dominion Architect.

As Chief Dominion Architect, he supervised the design and construction of every post office, customs building and federal government building erected in Canada between 1918 until 1927. His most significant work was the Confederation Building (Ottawa) (1927–30), in the Chateau Style. After Wright died in office, in January 1927, he was succeeded by Thomas W. Fuller.

== Works ==
He designed a number of buildings in Ottawa, Ontario. These include: The Hunter Building, Queen Street at Albert Street and O'Connor Street, 1918–19; War Trophies Building, Sussex Street (1920); Central Experimental Farm Building, addition of the Poultry Office Building (1920); Botanical Laboratory Building, (1924–25); Dominion Archives of Canada, Sussex Drive, major addition to existing building, with stair tower, (1923–24); Rideau Hall addition of Palm House Conservatory (1924–25); The Confederation Building (Ottawa), Wellington Street at Bank Street, (1927–30).

He designed two major additions at Royal Military College of Canada in Kingston Ontario. Known as the Currie Building, the Education Block, with west wing, assembly hall, and tower is in the Collegiate Gothic style (1920–21). He designed an addition to the Royal Military College of Canada Dormitory Building (1924–25).

He designed a number of Dominion Public Buildings: Calgary, Alberta (1919–21); Terrebonne, Quebec (1922–23); Sackville, New Brunswick Main Street at York Street (1924–25); Alexandria, Ontario, Main Street at Catherine Street (1924–25); Loretteville, Quebec, Main Street, (1924–25); Verdun, Quebec, Church Street (1925); Courtenay, British Columbia, Alice Street at Isabel Street (1925); Kamloops, British Columbia, Seymour Street at Third Avenue (1925); Revelstoke, British Columbia, First Street at Boyle Avenue (1925); Stellarton, Nova Scotia, Main Street (1926); Chipman, New Brunswick, Gordon Rioad (1926); South Nelson, New Brunswick (1926); Maniwaki, Quebec, Laird Street at Notre Dame Street (1926); Gravenhurst, Ontario, Muskoka Street at Bay Street (1926); Port Colborne, Ontario, Clarence Street at King Street (1926); Stouffville, Ontario, Main Street at Market Street (1926); Wiarton, Ontario, Bedford Street at George Street (1926); St. Jacque De L'Achigan, Quebec, Main Street, (1926).

He designed a number of post offices across Canada. Hamilton, Ontario, Postal Station B, Barton Street at Stirton Avenue (1919–20); Grand Prairie, Alberta, Second Avenue at Second Street (1919); Annapolis Royal, Nova Scotia, (1920–21); Montreal, Quebec Postal Station '˜R', St. Denis Street near Beaubien Street (1926).

He designed a Customs Examining Warehouse in Oshawa, Ontario (1919–20).

Building	Year Completed	Builder	Style	Location	Image
Currie Building R15 with west wing, assembly hall, and tower,	1918 to 1921 recognized Federal Heritage Building 1996 honours Lieutenant-General Sir Arthur Currie	Richard Cotsman Wright	Collegiate Gothic architecture	Royal Military College of Canada Kingston, Ontario	
Addition to dormitory building (Extension between Fort Haldimand and Yeo Hall)	1924–25 recognized Federal Heritage Building 1996	Richard Cotsman Wright	Collegiate Gothic architecture	Royal Military College of Canada, Kingston, Ontario	
Confederation Building (Ottawa), Wellington Street at Bank Street,	1928–31	Richard Cotsman Wright	Ottawa, Ontario	Ottawa, Ontario	

Political offices
Preceded by Edgar Lewis Horwood	Chief Dominion Architect, Canada; 1918 – 1927	Succeeded by Thomas W. Fuller
