= Dominion Experimental Farms =

Canadian research project

The Dominion Experimental Farms was an agricultural research project established in 1886 by an act of the Parliament of Canada. Originally it consisted of the Central Experimental Farm, located near Ottawa, between the provinces of Ontario and Quebec. The other provinces of Canada were to be served by a series of sub-stations.
