= Edgar Lewis Horwood =

Canadian architect

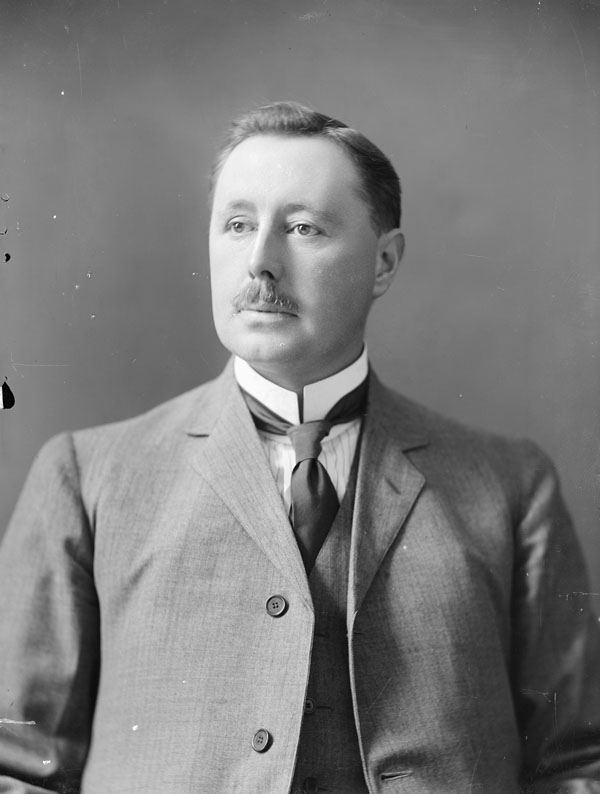
- E. L. Horwood, October 1913
- Born: 1868; Ottawa, Ontario, Canada
- Died: 1957; Ottawa, Ontario, Canada
- Occupation: Architect
- Practice: E.L. Horwood (1895-1912); Horwood & Taylor (1907-10); Horwood, Taylor & Horwood (1911-1912); E.L. Horwood (1918–1929); Horwood & Horwood (1929-1937)

Edgar Lewis Horwood (1868–1957) was a Canadian architect who served as Chief Dominion Architect from 1915 to 1917.

As chief government architect he was responsible for many of the federal buildings constructed in this period. Drawings for public buildings designed by Horwood and his staff during his tenure as Chief Architect of the Department of Public Works are held at the Library and Archives Canada in Ottawa.

He worked as an architect in private practice in Ottawa and the National Capital Region as E.L. Horwood (1895–1912); Horwood & Taylor (1907–10); Horwood, Taylor & Horwood (1911–1912); E.L. Horwood (1918–1929); Horwood & Horwood (1929–1937).

In 1891, Edgar Lewis Horwood designed the Britannia Nautical Club’s first clubhouse; the Club is celebrating is 125th anniversary in 2012.

== Works as Dominion Architect ==
As Dominion Architect, his most important building was the Dominion Astrophysical Observatory and residence, Victoria, British Columbia, West Saanich Road (1915–16), which is a National Historic Site of Canada.

Other buildings he designed include a drill hall in Calgary, Alberta in 1916–17, two buildings at the Central Experimental Farm in Ottawa, Ontario: the Cereal and Agrostology Building, (1915–16) and the Agricultural Building (1915). He also designed buildings for an Experimental Farm in Brandon, Manitoba. These included a utility building (1917); two large barns (1917). Other designs include an addition to the Royal Canadian Mint refinery on Sussex Drive (1916) and a number of post offices across Canada: Summerside, Prince Edward Island (1915); Hampton, New Brunswick (1914–15); Chester, Nova Scotia (1915); Almonte, Ontario (1914–15); Burford, Ontario, King Street (1914–15); Fort Frances, Ontario (1916); Milverton, Ontario (1914–15); Palmerston, Ontario, William Street at Bell Street, (1915); Shawville, Quebec (1915–16)

Building	Year Completed	Builder	Style	Location	Image
St. Stephen's Anglican Church (Ottawa)	1893	Edgar Lewis Horwood		Britannia, Ottawa now Ottawa, Ontario	
Britannia Nautical Club's clubhouse	1891	Edgar Lewis Horwood	Tudorbethian	Britannia, Ottawa now Ottawa, Ontario	Britannia yacht clubhouse
Royal Military College of Canada Workshop, former Riding School, Barriefield Road, Building R3; Recognized - 1984 Register of the Government of Canada Heritage Buildings;	1916	Edgar Lewis Horwood	Tudorbethian	Kingston, Ontario	
Mewata Drill Hall / Calgary Drill Hall 1989 National Historic Sites of Canada; Recognized - 1984 Register of the Government of Canada Heritage Buildings;	1916-17	Edgar Lewis Horwood	Tudorbethian	Calgary; 51°02′45″N 114°05′20″W	Exterior view of the south side of the Mewata Armoury
Dominion Astrophysical Observatory National Historic Site of Canada.	1915-0906	Edgar Lewis Horwood		Victoria, British Columbia	
Original Ottawa Public Library; Metcalfe Street at Laurier Avenue	1903-5	Edgar Lewis Horwood		Ottawa, Ontario	

== Works in private practice ==
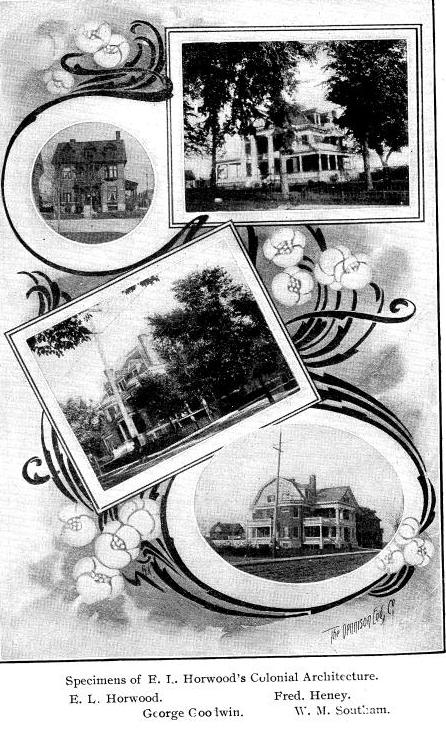
Specimens of Edgar Lewis.Horwood (architect) Colonial Architecture 1904 Ottawa, Ontario

- Trinity Methodist Church, 1896 Wellington, Ontario
- Ottawa City Hall, Elgin Street, addition and alterations, 1899; burned 1931
- Canadian Conservatory of Music, Bay Street at Slater Street, 1902
- Ottawa Citizen Building, Sparks Street, 1902–03
- Ottawa Public Library, Metcalfe Street at Laurier Avenue, 1903–05
- Manotick, Ontario Methodist Church, 1904
- Masonic Temple, Bank Street at Wellington Street, 1907
- Ottawa Collegiate Institute, Lisgar Street near Elgin Street, addition of West Wing, 1907
- Carp, Ontario, Methodist Church, 1912
- Pembroke, Ontario Holy Trinity Anglican Church, Renfrew Street, 1925
- Gatineau, Québec Château Monsarrat, AKA Stoneleigh, 100, rue du Château, 1930
- Central Experimental Farm, Carling Avenue, records storage building, 1937

Political offices
Preceded by David Ewart	Chief Dominion Architect, Canada; 1915 – 1917	Succeeded by Richard Cotsman Wright
