= Central Experimental Farm =

Government-owned farm and research facility in Ottawa, Ontario

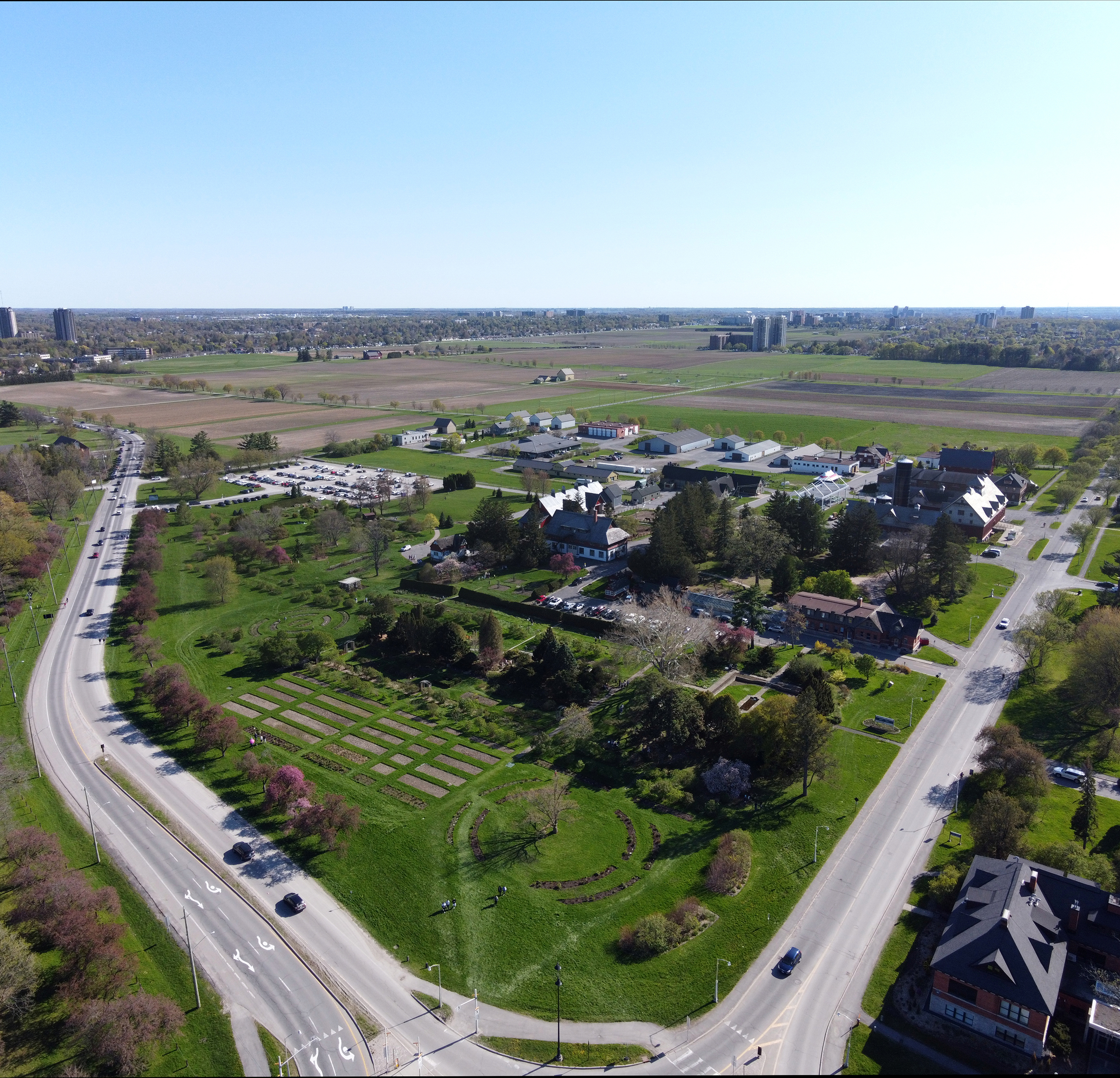
- Aerial view of Central Experimental Farm in 2025
- Interactive map of Central Experimental Farm
- 45.383°N 75.714°W
- Type: Agricultural facility, working farm, and research centre
- Location: Ottawa, Ontario, Canada

History
- Built: 1886

Site notes
- Governing body: Agriculture and Agri-Food Canada
- Website: Official website

National Historic Site of Canada
- Designated: 1998

The Central Experimental Farm (CEF), commonly known as the Experimental Farm, is an agricultural facility, working farm, and research centre of the Science and Technology Branch of Agriculture and Agri-Food Canada. The farm is centrally located in Ottawa, Canada. Located on 4 square kilometres (1.5 sq mi) of land, the farm is a National Historic Site of Canada and most of its buildings are protected and preserved as heritage buildings.

The CEF's original intent was to perform scientific research into agricultural methods and crops. While such research is still being conducted, the park-like atmosphere of the CEF has led to its becoming an important place of recreation and education for the residents of Ottawa.

Several other departments and agencies have encroached onto the CEF property, such as Natural Resources Canada, National Defence (HMCS Carleton on Dow's Lake), and the Ottawa Civic Hospital (helicopter pad).

The CEF is bordered by the Rideau Canal (a National Historic Site as well) to the east, Prince of Wales Drive to the South-East, Baseline Road to the south, and the Merivale and Fisher Roads in Carlington to the west, and Carling Avenue to the north.

== History ==
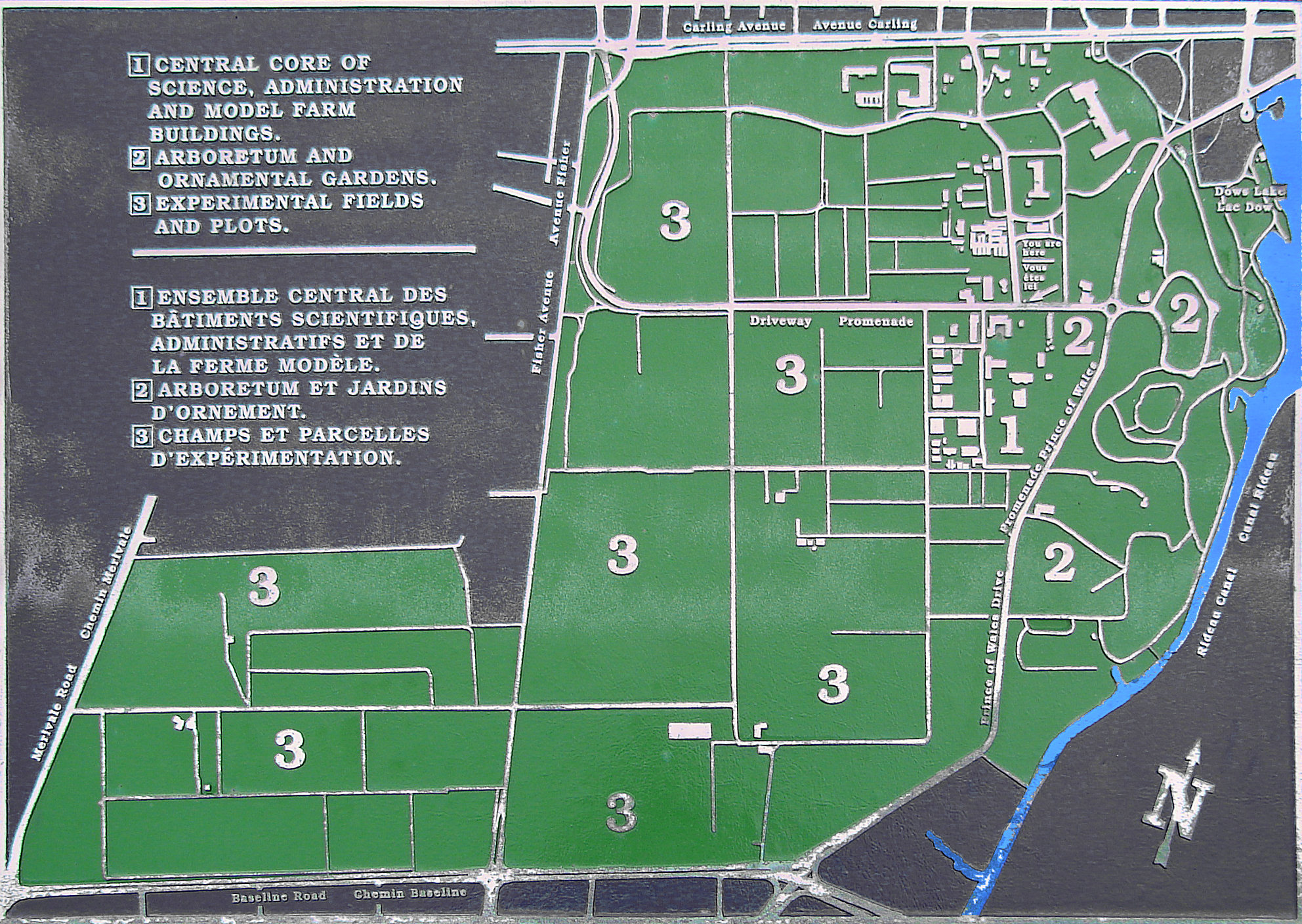
Overview map of the CEF

The Victorian era was a time of great interest in the advancement of natural sciences and many nations built zoos, observatories, botanical gardens, and experimental farms. Canada followed suit and as the result of lobbying by John Carling, the Minister of Agriculture, and William Saunders, the first director of the research branch, the "Act Respecting Experimental Stations" came into force in 1886. The land owned by local Ottawa farmers including John Mulligan (1799–1886) was sold to the government to create the experimental farm. The CEF started out with 188 hectares, chosen because of their proximity to Parliament Hill but (at that time) outside the city. Over the next few years the site was prepared by improving the land, building the facilities, and planting the Arboretum and forest belt. The CEF was established as the centre piece of the Dominion Experimental Farms, which would also have a series of sub stations located in other Canadian provinces. Early research projects focused only on entomology, botany, and horticulture.

The Chief Dominion Architect(s) designed a number of prominent public buildings in Canada including those at the CEF: Thomas Seaton Scott (1871–1881); Thomas Fuller (architect) (1880–1897); David Ewart (1897–1914); Edgar Lewis Horwood (1914–1918); Richard Cotsman Wright (1918–1927); Thomas W. Fuller (1927–1936), Charles D. Sutherland (1936–1947); Joseph Charles Gustave Brault (1947–1952) Thomas Seaton Scott and Thomas Fuller adopted the Neo-Gothic style. David Ewart embraced the Scottish baronial style.

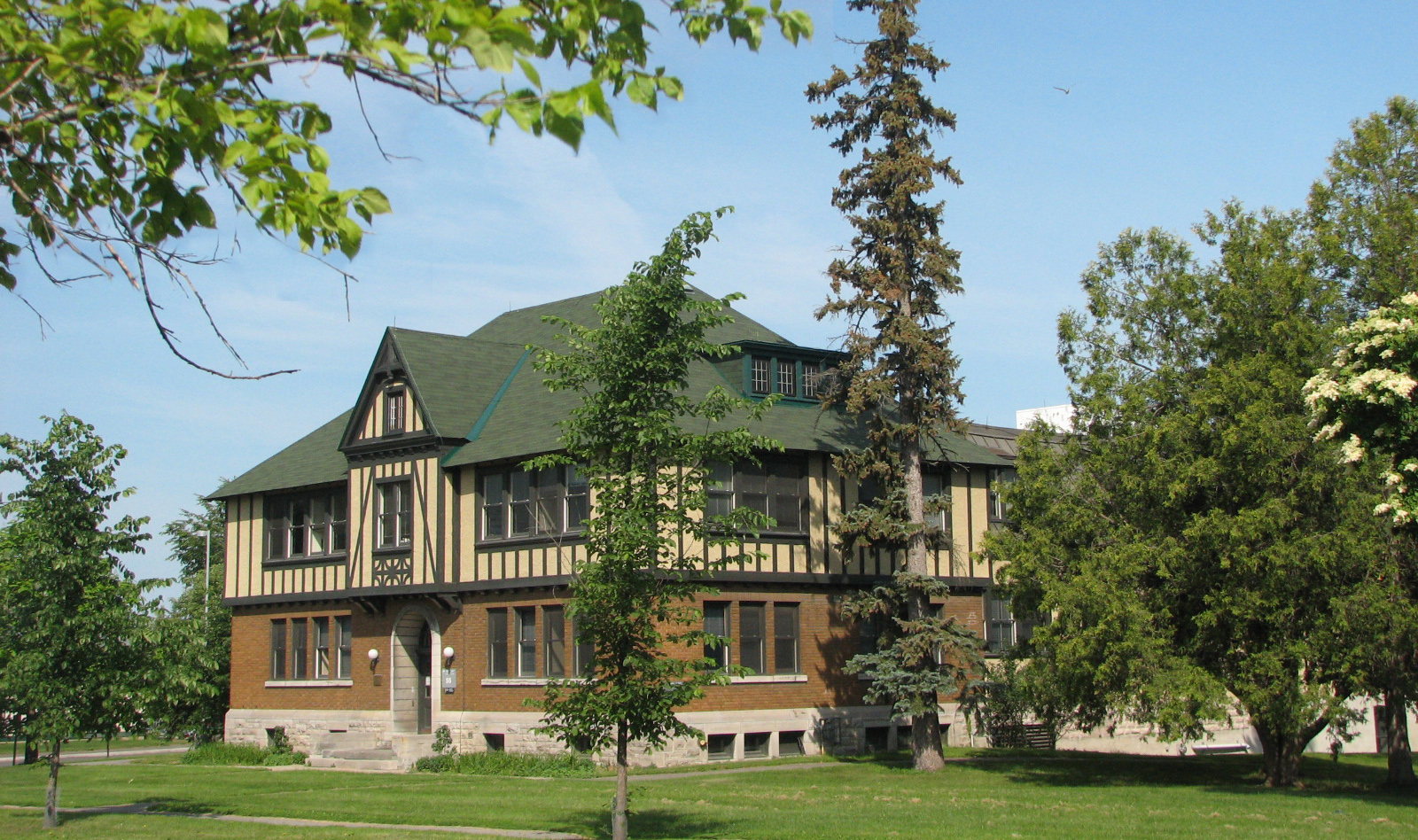
Historic Building No.55 at the Central Experimental Farm

In 1887–1888, Chief Dominion Architect Thomas Fuller designed the Museum, laboratories, barn, stables, and Staff Residences on Prince of Wales Drive In 1887, Charles F. Cox lay out of the site and design of farm buildings. In 1887–1888, William John Beckett, a contractor, served as foreman during the building of the residences, offices and barns.

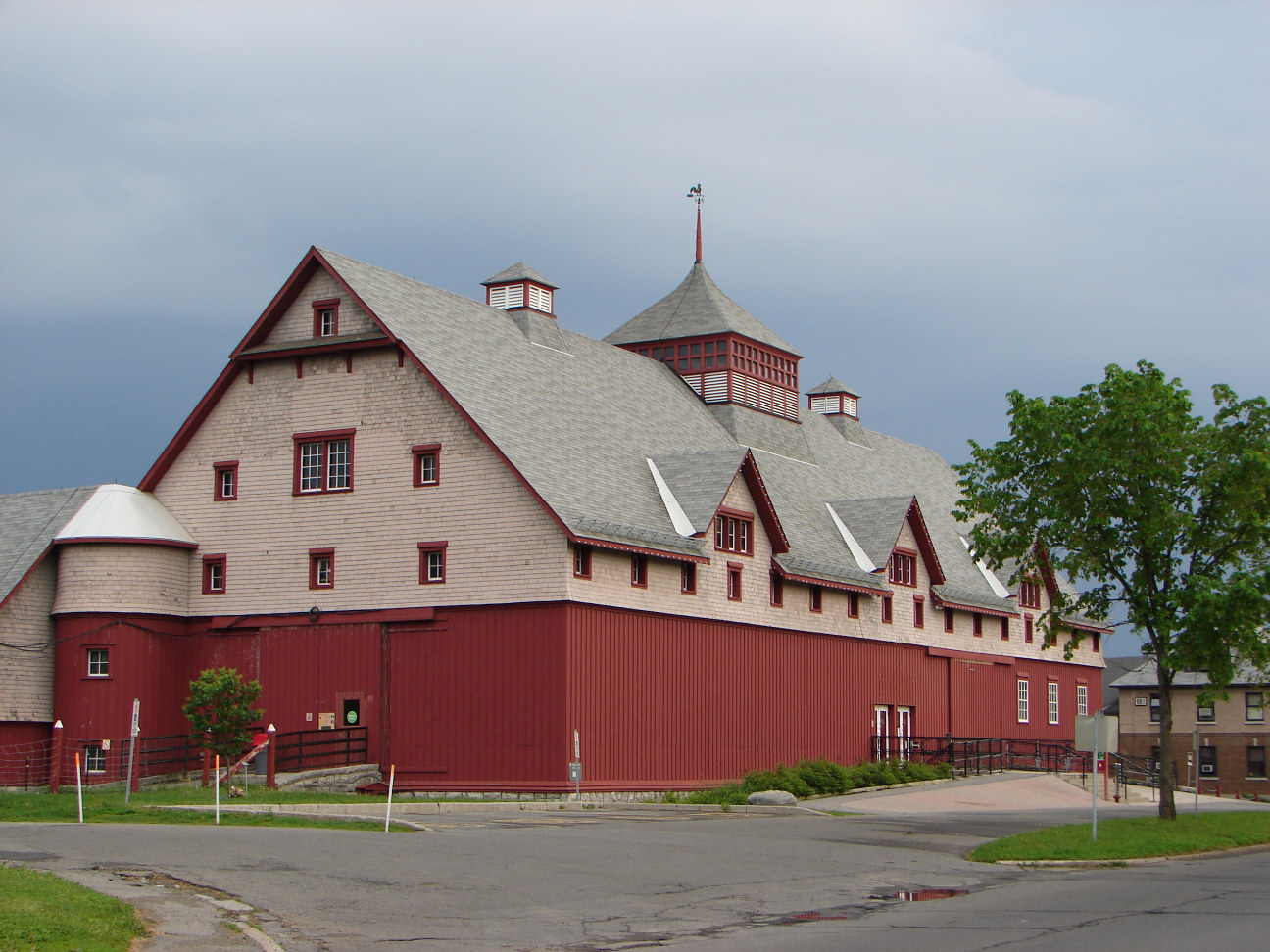
CEF Agricultural Museum

In 1889, livestock was introduced to the CEF.

Chief Dominion Architect David Ewart designed the Dominion Observatory, Carling Avenue in 1902; Chief Astronomer's Residence, 1909; and the Geodetic Survey Building, 1914. Chief Dominion Architect Edgar Lewis Horwood designed the Cereal and Agrostology Building, 1915–16; Agricultural Building, 1915; and records storage building, 1937. Chief Dominion Architect Richard Cotsman Wright designed a number of buildings including: the Poultry Office Building, 1920; and the Botanical Laboratory Building, 1924–25.

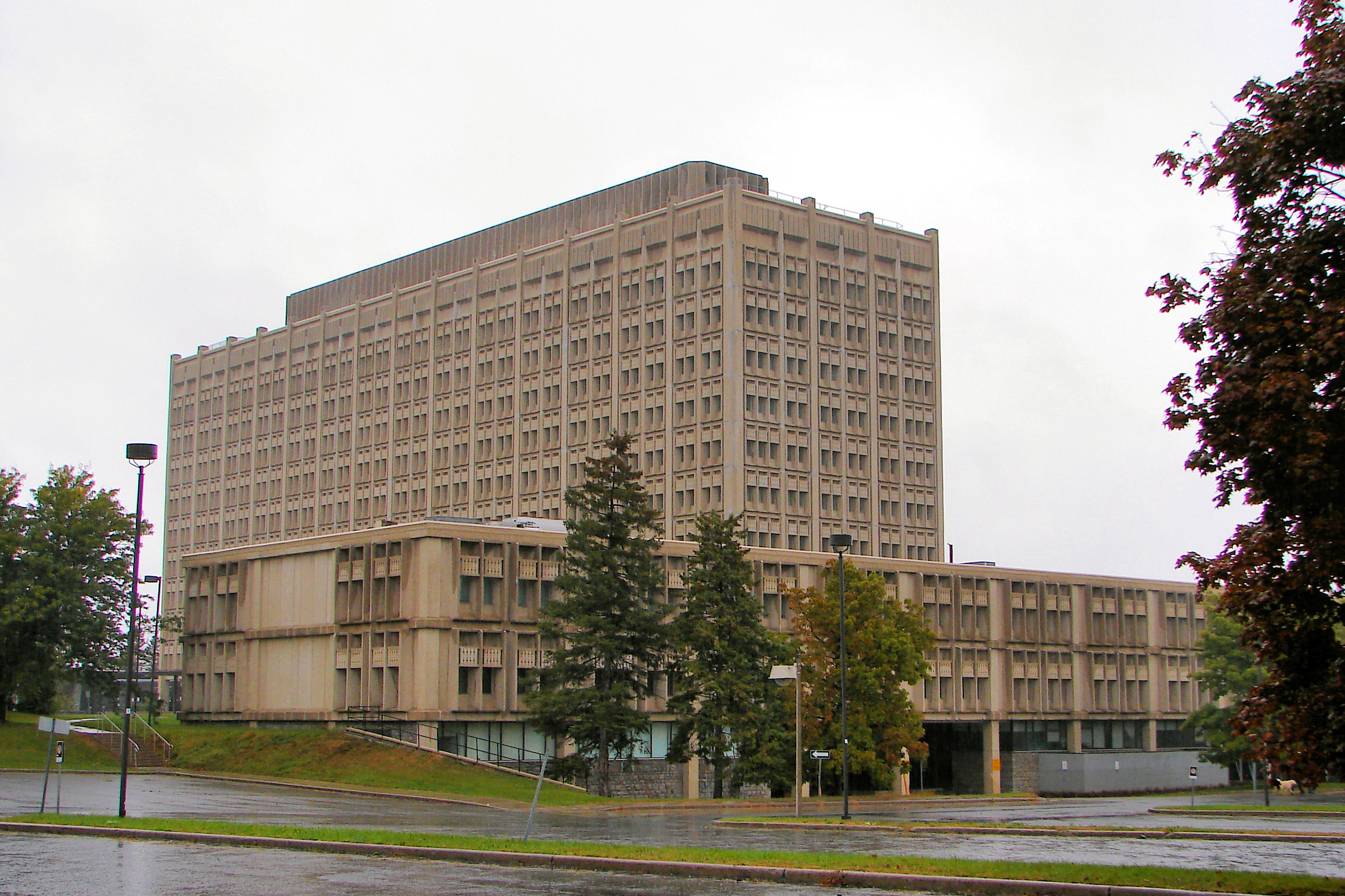
Sir John Carling Building

John Bethune Roper designed the Administration Building, Carling Avenue, 1934. William James Abra designed the Biological Building, 1935.

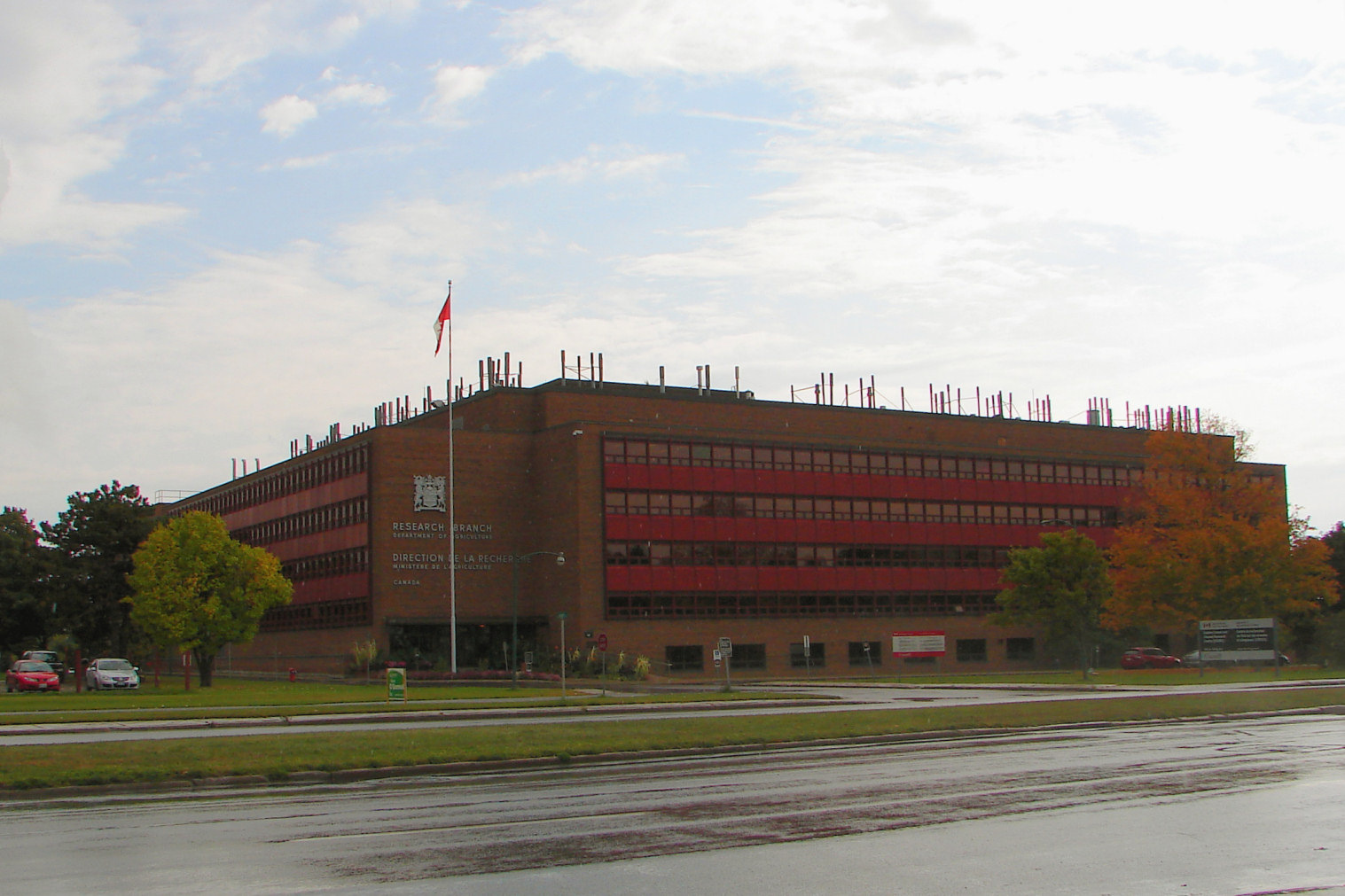
Neatby Building

Over the years the scope of research grew and changed, prompting a need to increase the farm's lands and buildings. The Horticulturalist's house and staff residences were removed by the 1930s (they were no longer needed since the city had grown around the farm), the forest belt gradually disappeared, and new larger centralized facilities were built, starting with the Saunders Building in 1935, followed by the Neatby Building, Geophysical Lab, Laboratory Services Building, and the Carling Building.

From 1940 to 1947, building 136 operated as a high frequency Naval Radio Station-CFF which frequently intercepted enemy transmissions. On May 1, 1993, a memorial was erected by NOAC and Royal Canadian Naval Association Ottawa and dedicated to the Naval Veterans and those who served at this station which provided a link during World War II between Canadian naval headquarters and ships at sea, allied naval headquarters and operational naval authorities.

The CEF was the site of a large scale cannabis grow operation in the 1970s, producing tonnes of crop from plants standing 20 feet tall. It was intended to provide Canadian scientists with reliable samples for research in response to an interim report of the Le Dain Commission. The plants were near Ash Lane, earning it the nickname "Hash Lane"; combined with the secrecy around the project, it became a local legend among area youth.

In 1983, the agricultural museum was created in the former Dairy Barn.

The Federal Heritage Buildings Review Office recognized or classified a number of CEF buildings on the Register of the Government of Canada Heritage Buildings between 1984 and 1997. The Cereal Barn Building 76 was classified in 1984. The Victoria Memorial Museum was classified in 1986. The Main Dairy Barn Building 88 was classified in 1987. In 1988, the Botanical Laboratory / Horticulture Building 74 and the Sheep Showcase / Small Dairy Barn Building 95 were recognized. The Nutrition Building 59 was recognized in 1992. In 1993, Heritage House, Building 60 was recognized. The William Saunders Building 49 was recognized in 1994. In 1995, Heritage House, Building 54; K. W. Neatby Building 20 and the Main Piggery, Building 91 were recognized. In 1996, the Main Greenhouse Range, Building 50 was recognized. In 1997, a number of buildings were recognized: ARC Biotech, Building 34; Carpenter Shed, Building 98; Cereal Crops Building 75; Dairy Technology Building 57; Engineering Research Building 94; Horticulture Building 55; Laboratory Services Building 22; Pottery Shed, Building 77; and Service Building 56.

The CEF was designated as a National Historic Site in 1997.

In 2003, Public Works and Government Services Canada bought the Skyline office complex on the corner of Merivale and Baseline Roads from Nortel Networks. The complex has been renamed to "NHCAP" (= National Headquarters Complex for the Agriculture Portfolio). The head offices of Agriculture and Agri-Food Canada have been relocated to this facility from the Sir John Carling Building, which was demolished on July 13, 2014.

The CEF housed, prior to its disestablishment on 29 September 2006 by the Harper government, the Canadian Agri-Food Research Council.

== Features ==
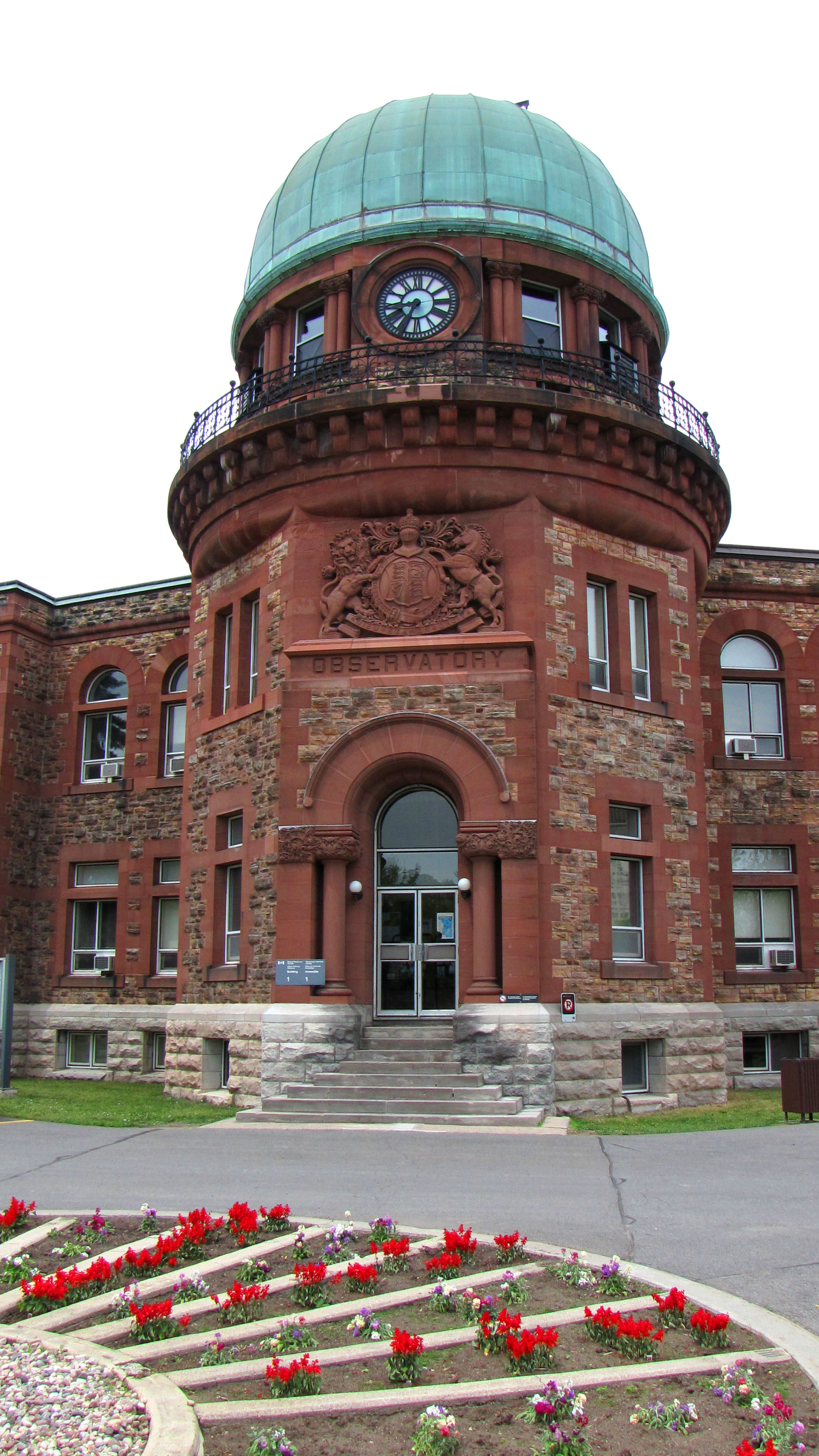
Dominion Observatory, Building No.1

Major features

- Dominion Observatory
- Canada Agriculture and Food Museum
- Dominion Arboretum
- Ornamental Gardens, consisting of:
  - the perennial collection
  - the rock garden
  - the rose garden
  - the annuals garden
  - the Macoun Memorial Garden
  - the hedge collection
- Fletcher Wildlife Garden

Notable office and research buildings

- Sir John Carling Building (demolished 2014)
- Ottawa Research and Development Centre, formerly the Eastern Cereal and Oilseed Research Centre (ECORC) / K.W. Neatby Building
- Skyline Building, 1341 Baseline Road.
- The Canadian 4-H Council and Canadian 4-H Foundation

== See also ==
- Agriculture in Canada
- Demonstration farm
- List of Ottawa, Ontario parks
- Manitoba Agricultural Museum
- Ontario Agricultural Museum
- Ross Farm Museum
- Evacuation of Polish National Treasures during World War II
