= K.W. Neatby Building =

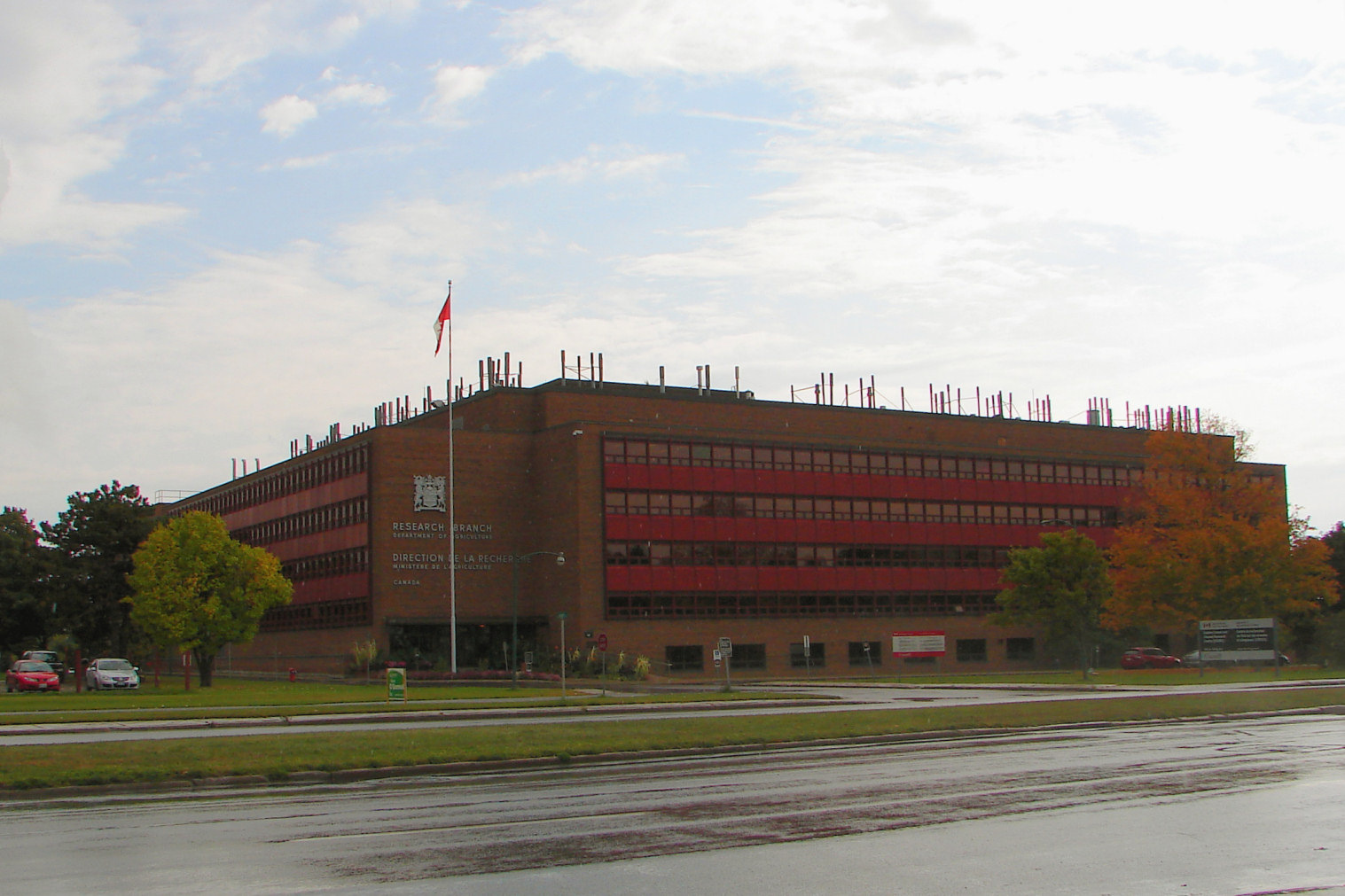
- Interactive map of the K.W. Neatby Building area

General information
- Location: 960 Carling Avenue, Ottawa, Ontario, Canada
- Coordinates: 45°23′33″N 75°43′00″W
- Completed: 1937
- Renovated: 1956
- Owner: Agriculture and Agri-Food Canada

The K.W. Neatby Building is located at the Central Experimental Farm in Ottawa, Ontario, Canada. The building contains the Eastern Cereal and Oilseed Research Centre (ECORC), a research centre belonging to the Research Branch of Agriculture and Agri-Food Canada. The building is a Recognized Heritage Building of Agriculture and Agri-Food Canada.
