= Confederation Building (Ottawa) =

Office building on Parliament Hill in Ottawa

Coordinates: 45.421905°N 75.702871°W

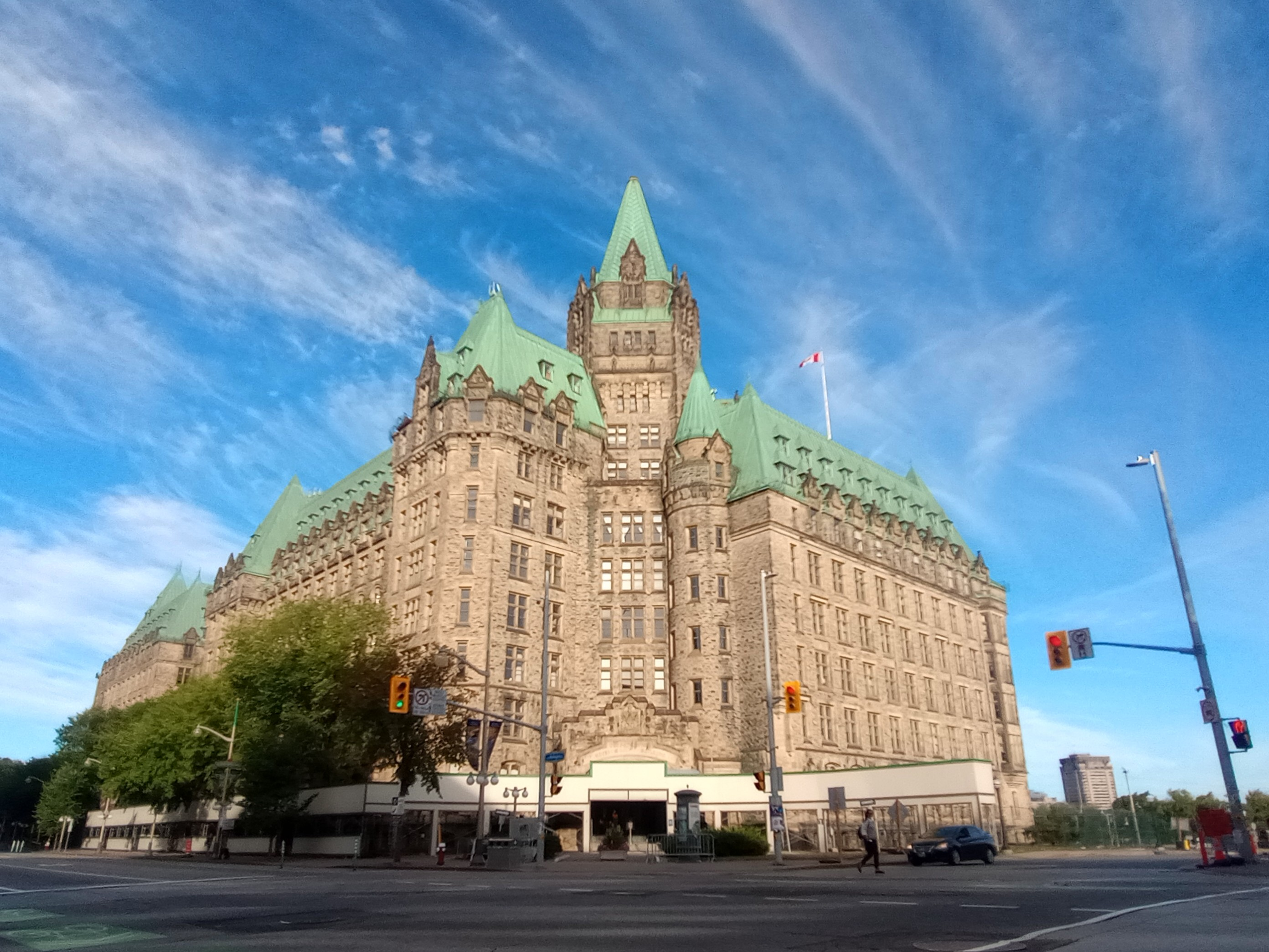
- Interactive map of the Confederation Building area

General information
- Architectural style: Chateau style
- Location: Ottawa, Ontario, Canada, 229 Wellington St
- Construction started: 1928
- Completed: 1932

The Confederation Building is an office building in Ottawa, Ontario, Canada. Located just west of the Parliament Buildings at Bank Street and Wellington Street, it is generally considered part of Parliament Hill.

The "civil gothic" structure was designed by Richard Cotsman Wright and Thomas W. Fuller. Work on the Confederation Building began when the cornerstone was laid by the Governor General Lord Willingdon as part of the celebrations of Canada's Diamond Jubilee.

The building originally housed workers in a number of departments, with the Department of Agriculture being the largest tenant. It is currently home to civil servants and to a number of MPs and ministers. Many Conservative, Liberal and NDP MPs have their offices there along with some junior cabinet members.

In 1988, the federal government designated the structure as a Classified Federal Heritage Building.
