= Malakoff, Ontario =

Coordinates: 45.103°N 75.770°W

Location of Malakoff in Ontario

Malakoff is a community in Rideau-Jock Ward in Ottawa, Ontario.

== History ==
By 1866, Malakoff was a post office in the township of Marlborough-26 miles from Ottawa, and 3 miles from North Gower; the postmaster was John Pierce. Citizens included Robert Kerr, who owned a hotel, and was a general merchant.
