= Sir John Carling Building =

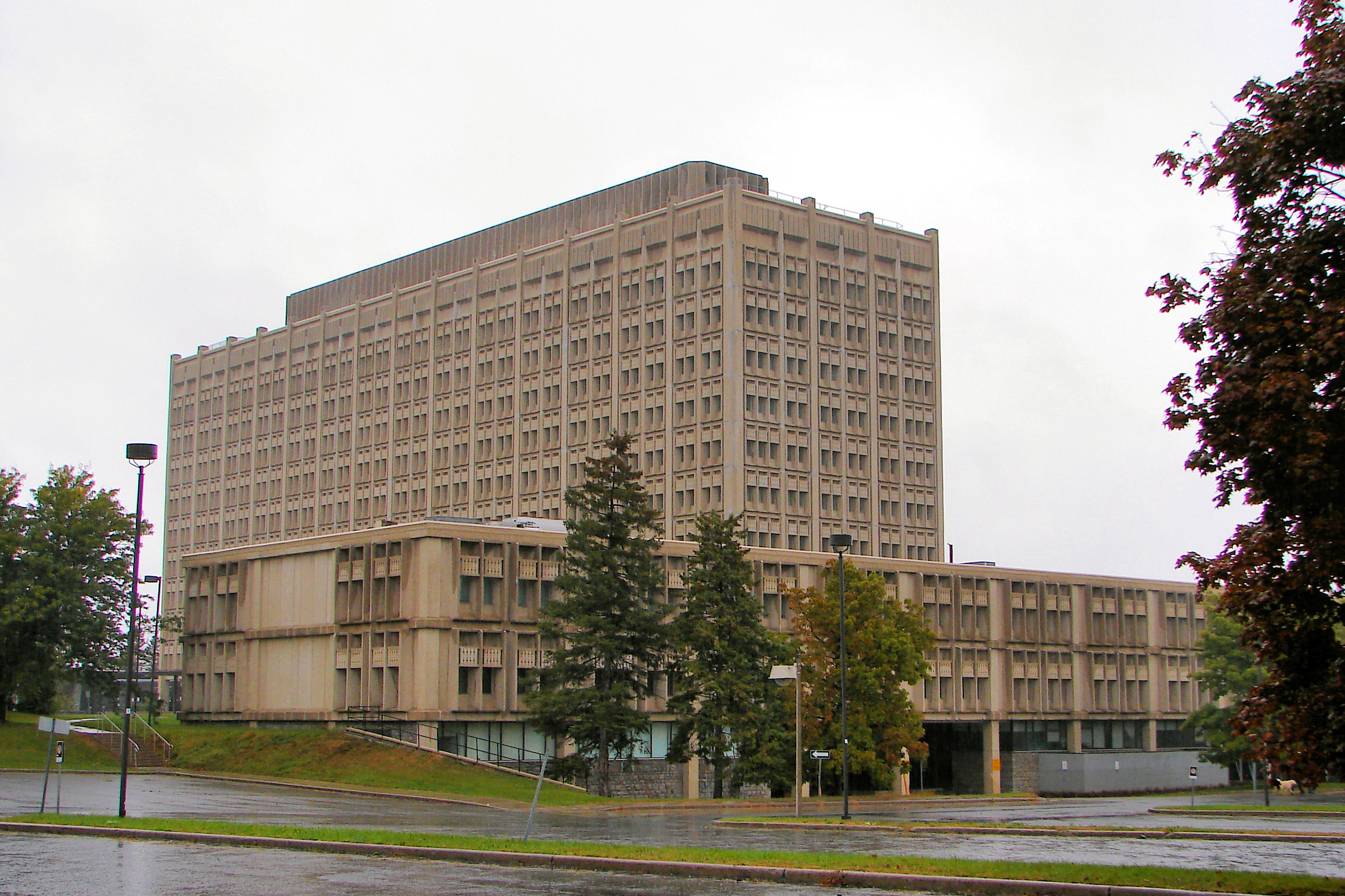
- Interactive map of the Sir John Carling Building area

General information
- Status: Demolished
- Architectural style: Modernist
- Location: 930 Carling Avenue, Ottawa, Ontario, Canada
- Coordinates: 45°23′39″N 75°42′39″W
- Completed: 1967
- Closed: 2009
- Demolished: July 13, 2014, at 06:59 am
- Owner: Public Works and Government Services Canada

Technical details
- Structural system: Reinforced concrete
- Material: Precast cladding
- Floor count: 11
- Floor area: 400,000 ft^{2} (37,000 m^{2})

Design and construction
- Architect: Hart Massey

The Sir John Carling Building was located along Carling Avenue at the Central Experimental Farm, in Ottawa, Ontario, Canada. Until 2010, it was the headquarters of Agriculture and Agri-Food Canada, containing administration facilities and the offices of the Minister and Deputy Minister of Agriculture.

Named after John Carling, it was an 11-storey building accommodating some 1,200 employees, with a 3-storey east wing for shipping and receiving and a single-storey cafeteria wing with an arched roof. It was demolished July 13, 2014, but the cafeteria wing is the only part of the building to remain.

== History ==
In the early 1950s, the offices for the federal agriculture department were scattered over 18 different sites, prompting the planning for the Carling Building, which began in 1954. Ottawa architect Hart Massey (1918–1996) designed the Sir John Carling in the 1960s and it opened in 1967, Canada's centennial year. Massey was the son of Vincent Massey, former Governor General of Canada and a member of the famous Massey family of Toronto. The construction costs were C$10 million of which CA$800,000 was Massey's fee.

Already by 1994, a study found that the building was suffering from long-term neglect and "may not be worth saving". By 2003, renovation costs were estimated at CA$57 million. A year later, the Federal Heritage Buildings Review Office designated it as a recognized federal heritage building for its historical associations, and its architectural and environmental values. The building was a good example of the modernist architectural style.

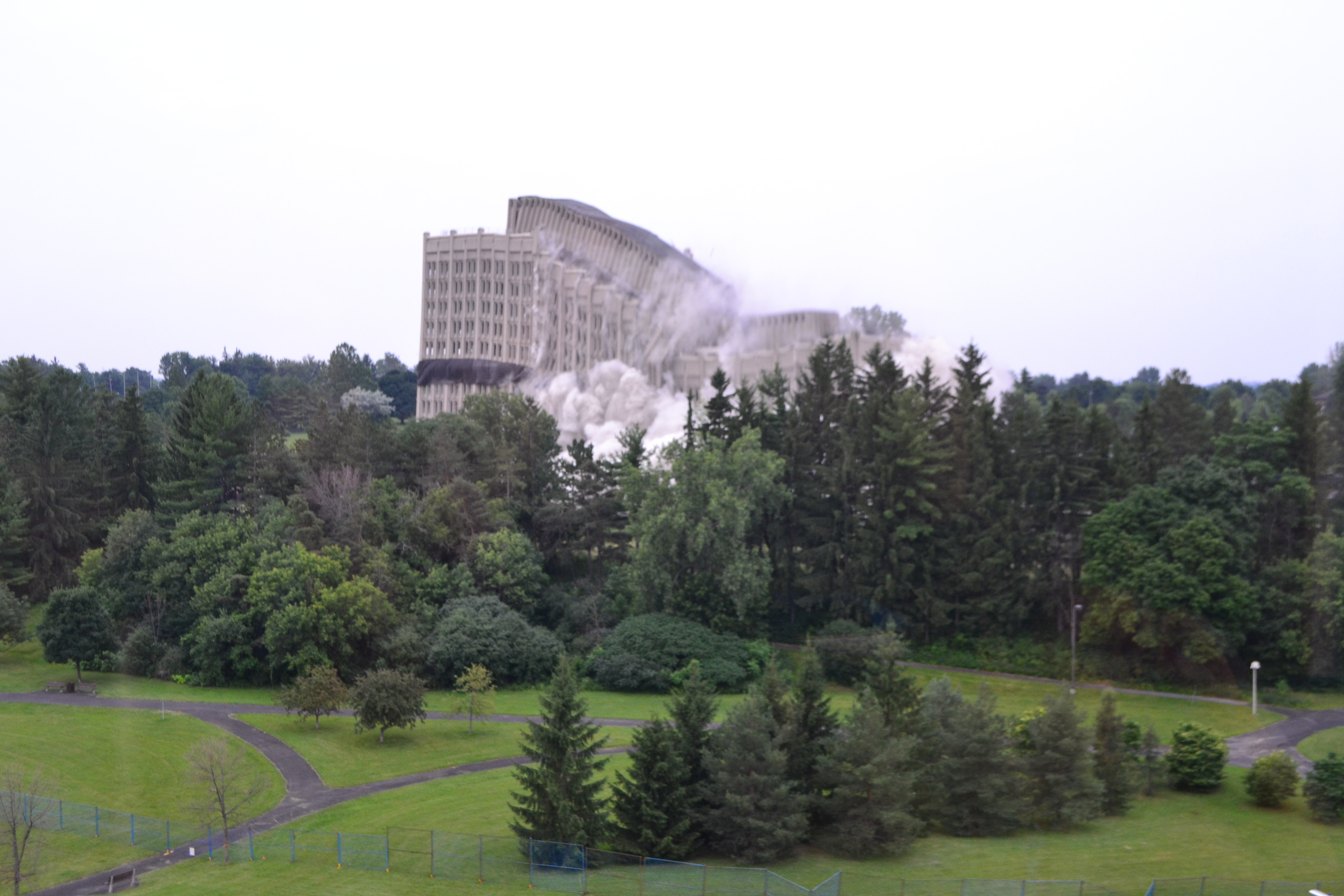
The Sir John Carling building as it collapses, July 13, 2014

In 2009, the building was deemed to be at its end-of-life and the agriculture offices were moved to the Skyline Office Campus on Baseline Road. Despite local objections and its recognized heritage status, deconstruction of the Carling Building began in April 2013, culminating in a controlled building implosion on July 13, 2014. Afterwards, the concrete was pulverized and the site covered with topsoil and trees. Total cost for the demolition was CA$4.8 million.
