= List of historic places in the Edmonton Capital Region =

This article is a list of historic places in the Edmonton Metropolitan Region entered on the Canadian Register of Historic Places, whether they are federal, provincial, or municipal.

== List ==
Name	Address	Coordinates	Government recognition (CRHP №)	Wikidata ID	Image
Jasper Block (1909)	10514–10520 Jasper Avenue, Edmonton AB	53°32′28″N 113°30′07″W	Edmonton municipality (1205)	Q24040357	More images
Armstrong Block	10125 104th Street, Edmonton AB	53°32′30″N 113°29′55″W	Alberta (1808), Edmonton municipality (3008)	Q33212294	More images
Hull Block	10601 97th Street, Edmonton AB	53°33′02″N 113°29′18″W	Alberta (1812), Edmonton municipality (2472)	Q37778213	More images
Molstad Residence	9633 95th Avenue, Edmonton AB	53°31′55″N 113°28′37″W	Alberta (1814), Edmonton municipality (2983)	Q38529019	More images
Old St. Stephen's College	8820 112th Street, Edmonton AB	53°31′28″N 113°31′18″W	Alberta (1816)	Q38529417	More images
Government House	12845 102nd Avenue, Edmonton AB	53°32′30″N 113°32′39″W	Federal (19589), Alberta (1819)	Q5588889	More images
Lodge Hotel	9660 Jasper Avenue	53°32′34″N 113°29′03″W	Edmonton municipality (1890)	Q42331601	More images
Brighton Block	9670 Jasper Avenue	53°32′34″N 113°29′04″W	Edmonton municipality (1892)	Q41796638	More images
Phillips Building	10169 104th Street	53°32′33″N 113°29′55″W	Edmonton municipality (2461)	Q42331784	More images
North Telephone Exchange	10105 112th Avenue	53°33′39″N 113°29′39″W	Edmonton municipality (2469)	Q42331753	More images
Trudel Residence	8134 Jasper Avenue	53°33′26″N 113°28′01″W	Edmonton municipality (2471)	Q42331917	More images
Gibson Block		53°32′37″N 113°28′57″W	Alberta (5058), Edmonton municipality (2475)	Q37778036	More images
Hecla Block	10141 95th Street	53°32′40″N 113°28′41″W	Edmonton municipality (2476)	Q41796708	More images
Canadian Consolidated Rubber Company	10249 104th Street	53°32′40″N 113°29′56″W	Edmonton municipality (2477)	Q41796646	More images
Building J-3 (Headquarters, Army Western Command) (Demolished as of spring 2015)	CFB Edmonton - Garrison; Edmonton AB	53°36′00″N 113°30′04″W	Federal (2656)		Upload Photo
A. MacDonald Building	10128 105th Avenue, Edmonton AB	53°32′53″N 113°29′42″W	Alberta (3440), Edmonton municipality (2705)	Q33212079	More images
Metals Building	10186-10190 104th Street	53°32′34″N 113°29′59″W	Edmonton municipality (2710)	Q42331729	More images
Rehwinkel Parsonage	9608 110th Avenue	53°33′28″N 113°29′21″W	Edmonton municipality (2833)	Q42331804	More images
Imperial Bank of Canada Building	9990 Jasper Avenue	53°32′29″N 113°29′23″W	Edmonton municipality (2854)	Q41796726	More images
The Carter Residence	10603 103rd Street	53°33′00″N 113°29′48″W	Edmonton municipality (2866)	Q41796652	More images
Hudson's Bay Company Stables / Ortona Armoury	9722 102nd Street	53°32′07″N 113°29′46″W	Edmonton municipality (2978)	Q41796720	More images
Westminster Apartments	9955 - 114 Street; Edmonton AB	53°32′19″N 113°31′01″W	Edmonton municipality (2981)	Q42331980	More images
Hangar #14	11410 Kingsway NW, Edmonton AB	53°33′57″N 113°31′01″W	Alberta (3443), Edmonton municipality (2985)	Q4711581	More images
McTaggart Residence	11530 - 95A Street; Edmonton AB	53°34′00″N 113°29′20″W	Edmonton municipality (2992)	Q42331714	More images
Notre Dame Convent	10010 101st Street, Morinville AB	53°48′10″N 113°38′49″W	Alberta (3006)	Q24090398	More images
Churchill Wire Centre	10003 - 102 Avenue; Edmonton AB	53°32′35″N 113°29′28″W	Edmonton municipality (3010)	Q41796662	More images
Foote Residence	9704 - 106 Street; Edmonton AB	53°32′03″N 113°30′11″W	Edmonton municipality (3012)	Q41796688	More images
H.V. Shaw Building	10229 - 105 Street; Edmonton AB	53°32′37″N 113°30′04″W	Edmonton municipality (3014)	Q41796723	More images
Hudson's Bay Company Department Store	10230 Jasper Avenue; Edmonton AB	53°32′29″N 113°29′46″W	Edmonton municipality (3015)	Q41796718	More images
Kingston Powell Building	10277 - 97 Street; Edmonton AB	53°32′45″N 113°29′12″W	Edmonton municipality (3016)	Q42331594	More images
Lambton Block	11045 - 97 Street; Edmonton AB	53°33′30″N 113°29′30″W	Edmonton municipality (3017)	Q42331598	More images
McLeod Building	10134 100th Street, Edmonton AB	53°32′33″N 113°29′27″W	Alberta (5143), Edmonton municipality (3018)	Q6802220	More images
Parkview Apartments	10612 - 97 Avenue; Edmonton AB	53°32′03″N 113°30′11″W	Edmonton municipality (3019)	Q42331771	More images
Goodridge Block	9648 Jasper Avenue; Edmonton AB	53°32′33″N 113°29′06″W	Edmonton municipality (3442)	Q41796703	More images
Richard Wallace Residence	10950 - 81 Street; Edmonton AB	53°33′31″N 113°27′57″W	Edmonton municipality (3446)	Q42331805	More images
Ross Flats Apartments	9540 - 101 Street; Edmonton AB	53°31′56″N 113°29′38″W	Edmonton municipality (3447)	Q42331813	More images
Union Bank Building	10053 Jasper Avenue; Edmonton AB	53°32′27″N 113°29′31″W	Alberta (18049), Edmonton municipality (3449)	Q42331926	More images
Bishop's Palace	5 Rue St. Vital, St. Albert AB	53°38′20″N 113°37′48″W	Alberta (4997)	Q24453429	More images
Father Lacombe Church	7 Rue St. Vital, St. Albert AB	53°38′19″N 113°37′52″W	Alberta (5004)	Q24453433	More images
St. Jean Baptiste Church and Rectory (destroyed 2021)	10034 100th Avenue, Morinville AB	53°48′08″N 113°38′49″W	Alberta (5008)	Q24039044	More images
Sheriff Robertson House	8120 Jasper Avenue, Edmonton AB	53°33′26″N 113°27′59″W	Alberta (5060)	Q38530273	More images
Fort Saskatchewan Museum	10104 101st Street, Fort Saskatchewan AB	53°42′47″N 113°13′01″W	Alberta (5103)	Q24083239	More images
Canadian Northern Railway Station	10030 99th Avenue	53°42′35″N 113°12′52″W	Alberta (10458)	Q37777485	More images
Land Titles Building - Victoria Armouries	10523 100th Avenue, Edmonton AB	53°32′19″N 113°30′09″W	Alberta (5107)	Q6483990	More images
St. Josaphat Ukrainian Catholic Cathedral	10825 97 Street NW	53°33′16″N 113°29′24″W	Alberta (5110)	Q4425979	More images
Edmonton Settlement School	10425 99th Avenue NW, Edmonton AB	53°32′12″N 113°30′04″W	Alberta (5139)	Q24485238	More images
McKay Avenue School	10425 99th Avenue; Edmonton AB	53°32′13″N 113°30′01″W	Alberta (5142)	Q38528695	More images
LeMarchand Mansion	11523 100th Avenue, Edmonton AB	53°32′18″N 113°31′14″W	Alberta (5184)	Q38528277	More images
Stony Plain School	5411 51st Street, Stony Plain AB	53°31′31″N 114°00′32″W	Alberta (5187)	Q24429130	Upload Photo
Canada Permanent Building	10126 100th Street, Edmonton AB, 10126 100 Street NW	53°32′30″N 113°29′27″W	Alberta (5888)	Q33212587	More images
Loyal Orange Hall #1654 of Edmonton	10335 84th Avenue NW, Edmonton AB	53°31′11″N 113°29′48″W	Alberta (8188), Edmonton municipality (5900)	Q38529469	More images
Hotel Grand	10765 - 98 Street; Edmonton AB	53°33′11″N 113°29′28″W	Edmonton municipality (5902)	Q41796717	More images
Hugh Duncan Residence	8520 - 104 Street; Edmonton AB	53°31′18″N 113°30′00″W	Edmonton municipality (5903)	Q41796721	More images
Margaret Martin Residence	8324 - 106 Street; Edmonton AB	53°31′12″N 113°30′14″W	Edmonton municipality (5904)	Q42358228	More images
St. Francis of Assisi Friary / St. Anthony's Seraphic College	6770 129th Avenue, Edmonton AB	53°35′19″N 113°26′43″W	Alberta (7987), Edmonton municipality (5905)	Q38530365	More images
Alberta Grain Company Grain Elevator	4C Meadowview Drive, St Albert AB	53°38′00″N 113°38′31″W	Alberta (7305)	Q24453436	More images
Alberta Wheat Pool Grain Elevator (St. Albert)	4B Meadowview Drive, St Albert AB	53°37′59″N 113°38′27″W	Alberta (7306)	Q24453438	More images
John McNeill Residence	11217 - 97 Street; Edmonton AB	53°33′42″N 113°29′29″W	Edmonton municipality (8485)	Q42331579	More images
Prince of Wales Armoury	10440 108th Avenue, Edmonton AB	53°33′15″N 113°30′01″W	Alberta (8487), Edmonton municipality (8995)	Q38529732	More images
Hotel Macdonald	10065 100 Street NW, Edmonton, Alberta	53°32′25″N 113°29′20″W	Edmonton municipality (8791)	Q3145578	More images
Dr. Woods House	4801 49th Avenue, Leduc AB	53°15′49″N 113°32′53″W	Leduc municipality (8804)	Q24083249	More images
William Paskins Residence	10613 - 95 Street; Edmonton AB	53°33′05″N 113°28′55″W	Edmonton municipality (8996)	Q42331996	More images
Strathcona Collegiate Institute (Old Scona Academic High School)	10523 84 Avenue, Edmonton AB	53°31′11″N 113°30′07″W	Alberta (10412)	Q14458671	More images
Ingebert Olson Residence	7701 - 112 Avenue; Edmonton AB	53°33′37″N 113°27′35″W	Edmonton municipality (11068)	Q41796727	More images
R.G.J. Smith Residence	9824-92 Avenue; Edmonton AB	53°31′39″N 113°28′59″W	Edmonton municipality (11499)	Q42331797	More images
Grierson Centre	9530 101st Avenue, Edmonton AB	53°32′38″N 113°28′44″W	Federal (11512)	Q5608703	More images
Old Strathcona (1891-1914)		53°31′05″N 113°29′50″W	Alberta (11853)	Q7085136	More images
Leduc-Woodbend Oilfield	50339 Highway 60, Leduc County AB	53°18′00″N 113°43′00″W	Federal (12744)	Q23706039	More images
Rundle's Mission		53°04′37″N 114°08′34″W	Federal (13218)	Q7379774	More images
Edmonton Residential School (Destroyed by arson July 2000)	east of St. Albert; AB	53°39′09″N 113°34′20″W	Alberta (15527)	Q37777915	Upload Photo
George Harcourt Residence	9127 - 117 Street NW; Edmonton AB	53°31′38″N 113°31′55″W	Edmonton municipality (17902)	Q41796699	More images
St. Aidan and St. Hilda Anglican Church		53°35′07″N 114°33′58″W	Alberta (18322)	Q24090445	More images
Fort Augustus and Fort Edmonton	Lamoureux Drive; Hwy 15; AB	53°44′19″N 113°11′56″W	Federal (18985)	Q23706042	More images
Alberta Wheat Pool Grain Elevator Site Complex	5209 47th Street, Leduc AB	53°16′00″N 113°32′49″W	Alberta (4996)	Q24083266	More images
Leduc No. 1 Discovery Well	south of Devon; AB	53°19′47″N 113°43′30″W	Alberta (5059)	Q6512778	More images
Rossdale Power Plant	10155 96 Avenue NW; Edmonton AB	53°31′46″N 113°29′55″W	Alberta (5896)	Q38530075	More images
Oblats Maison Provinciale	9916 110th Street	53°32′16″N 113°30′39″W	Alberta (5913), Edmonton municipality (6538)	Q38529327	More images
Atlantic No. 3 Wild Well Site	south of Devon; AB	53°19′56″N 113°42′14″W	Alberta (7295)	Q24476315	More images
Balfour Manor	10139 - 116 Street; Edmonton AB	53°32′31″N 113°31′16″W	Edmonton municipality (8496)	Q41796625	More images
Charles Barker Residence	10834 - 125 Street; Edmonton AB	53°33′13″N 113°32′17″W	Edmonton municipality (2977)	Q41796658	More images
Wells Residence	10328 Connaught Drive; Edmonton AB	53°32′43″N 113°32′38″W	Edmonton municipality (3450)	Q42331978	More images
Hyndman Residence	10123 - 136 Street; Edmonton AB	53°32′31″N 113°33′22″W	Edmonton municipality (5911)	Q41796724	More images
McIntosh Residence	10325 Villa Avenue, Edmonton AB	53°32′44″N 113°32′24″W	Alberta (6764)	Q38529828	More images
Walker School (Bruderheim)		53°48′13″N 112°55′41″W	Alberta (7300)	Q24428414	More images
St. Joachim's Roman Catholic Church	9924 110 Street NW	53°32′17″N 113°30′39″W	Alberta (8356)	Q38530435	More images
Robertson-Wesley United Church	10209 123rd Street, Edmonton AB	53°32′36″N 113°32′01″W	Edmonton municipality (8488)	Q7352081	More images
First Presbyterian Church	10025 105th Street, Edmonton AB	53°32′23″N 113°30′04″W	Alberta (8489)	Q5453563	More images
High Level Bridge	109 Street across the North Saskatchewan River; AB	53°31′50″N 113°30′40″W	Edmonton municipality (3031)	Q5755824	More images
Holgate Residence	6210 Ada Boulevard, Edmonton AB	53°33′49″N 113°25′56″W	Alberta (5105)	Q37778185	More images
Notre Dame De Lourdes Roman Catholic Church		53°43′00″N 113°13′17″W	Alberta (5109)	Q24485715	More images
Magrath Mansion	6240 Ada Boulevard, Edmonton AB	53°33′48″N 113°26′01″W	Alberta (6768)	Q38528516	More images
Owen Residence / Dominion Meteorological Station	11227 63th Street, Edmonton AB	53°33′59″N 113°26′06″W	Alberta (8723)	Q38529547	More images
Otto Reiher Cottage	11845 - 52 Street; Edmonton AB	53°34′19″N 113°25′17″W	Edmonton municipality (11478)	Q42331766	More images
Grierson Residence	6124 111th Avenue, Edmonton AB	53°33′53″N 113°25′57″W	Alberta (15483)	Q37778109	More images
Brick House	20450 - 34 Street; Edmonton AB	53°40′06″N 113°23′38″W	Edmonton municipality (3009)	Q41796636	More images
George Durrand Residence	10417 Saskatchewan Drive; Edmonton AB	53°31′23″N 113°29′56″W	Edmonton municipality (2470)	Q41796697	More images
Delmar Bard Residence and Carriage House	10544 84th Avenue, Edmonton AB	53°31′13″N 113°30′09″W	Alberta (8728), Edmonton municipality (2706)	Q37777751	More images
Mill Creek Trestle Bridge		53°30′45″N 113°28′11″W	Edmonton municipality (2984)	Q42331731	More images
Thomas Scott Residence	9938 - 85 Avenue; Edmonton AB	53°31′16″N 113°29′17″W	Edmonton municipality (3144)	Q42331908	More images
Strathcona Hotel	10302 Whyte Avenue, Edmonton AB	53°31′06″N 113°29′43″W	Alberta (3194)	Q23979534	More images
Roy Gerolamy Residence	9823 - 91 Avenue; Edmonton AB	53°31′34″N 113°29′02″W	Edmonton municipality (3448)	Q42331819	More images
Douglas Block	10442 Whyte Avenue, Edmonton AB	53°31′06″N 113°29′57″W	Alberta (5057)	Q37777840	More images
Strathcona Canadian Pacific Railway Station	8101 Gateway Boulevard, Edmonton AB	53°31′01″N 113°29′38″W	Federal (4528), Alberta (5061), Edmonton municipality (9013)	Q7622068	More images
William Wood Residence	7504 - 106 Street NW; Edmonton AB	53°30′41″N 113°30′18″W	Edmonton municipality (17903)	Q42331999	More images
Strathcona Public Building (Old Strathcona Post Office)	10501 Whyte Avenue, Edmonton AB	53°31′04″N 113°30′04″W	Alberta (5062)	Q7622083	More images
Holy Trinity Anglican Church	10037 84th Avenue NW, Edmonton AB	53°31′11″N 113°29′28″W	Alberta (5068)	Q24514759	More images
Ritchie Mill (North West Mill and Feed Company)	10170 Saskatchewan Drive, Edmonton AB	53°31′24″N 113°29′39″W	Alberta (5722), Edmonton municipality (3011)	Q7336675	More images
Gainer Block	10341 Whyte Avenue, Edmonton AB	53°31′04″N 113°29′48″W	Alberta (5760)	Q37778013	More images
Strathcona Public Library	8331 104th Street, Edmonton AB	53°31′12″N 113°29′53″W	Alberta (5919), Edmonton municipality (7212)	Q23933925	More images
Connaught Armoury	10310 85th Avenue, Edmonton AB	53°31′15″N 113°29′46″W	Alberta (6574)	Q5161317	More images
W.H. Sheppard House	9945 86th Avenue, Edmonton AB	53°31′18″N 113°29′18″W	Alberta (6578)	Q38530851	More images
Strathcona Fire Hall No. 1 (The Walterdale Playhouse)	10322 83 Avenue NW, 10322 83rd Avenue, Edmonton AB	53°31′09″N 113°29′46″W	Alberta (8225)	Q7773382	More images
J.J. Duggan Residence (Duggan House)	10515 Saskatchewan Drive NW	53°31′22″N 113°30′05″W	Alberta (8490)	Q37778288	More images
St. Joseph's Hospital	10722 - 82 Avenue; Edmonton AB	53°31′06″N 113°30′25″W	Edmonton municipality (8790)	Q24514783	More images
Princess Theatre	10337 Whyte Avenue, Edmonton AB T6E 1Z9	53°31′04″N 113°29′46″W	Alberta (9152)	Q7244852	More images
John Walter Museum and Historical Area	9100 Walterdale Hill	53°31′41″N 113°30′17″W	Alberta (9187), Edmonton municipality (2986)	Q37778315	More images
Sarah McLellan House	11135 84th Avenue	53°31′11″N 113°31′10″W	Alberta (5009), Edmonton municipality (2223)	Q38530208	More images
Cecil Burgess Residence	10958 - 89 Avenue; Edmonton AB	53°31′30″N 113°30′54″W	Edmonton municipality (2255)	Q41796655	More images
Rutherford House	11153 Saskatchewan Drive; Edmonton AB	53°31′41″N 113°31′12″W	Alberta (5232)	Q7383343	More images
Emily Murphy Residence	11011 88th Avenue, Edmonton AB	53°31′25″N 113°30′58″W	Alberta (5702)	Q23979514	More images
Dr. Terwillegar's Residence	10727 - 125 Street; Edmonton AB	53°33′06″N 113°32′14″W	Edmonton municipality (9014)	Q41796678	More images
Ukrainian National Federation of Canada - Edmonton Branch Hall	10629 - 98 Street; Edmonton AB	53°33′03″N 113°29′24″W			Upload Photo

== See also ==
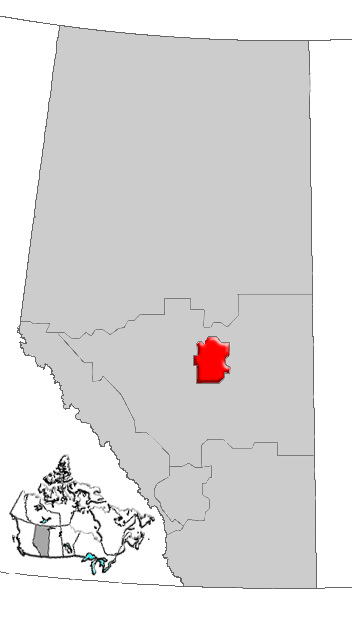
- List of historic places in Alberta
- List of historic places in the Calgary Region
- List of National Historic Sites of Canada in Alberta
