= David Ewart =

Canadian architect (1841–1921)

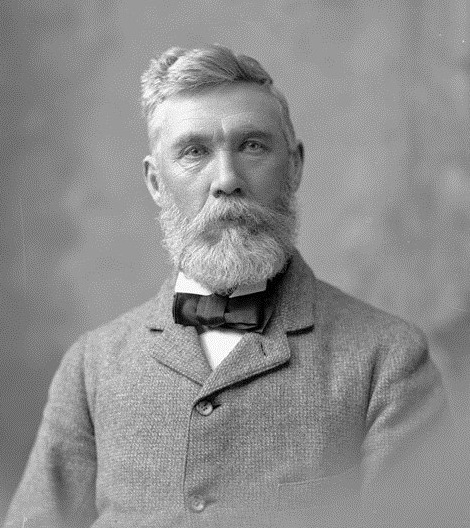
- David Ewart, 1901
- Born: 18 February 1841; Penicuik, Scotland
- Died: 6 June 1921 (aged 80); Ottawa, Ontario, Canada
- Occupation: Architect
- Awards: Imperial Service Order
- Practice: Chief Dominion Architect
- Buildings: Connaught Building, Victoria Memorial Building, Royal Canadian Mint

David Ewart, ISO (18 February 1841 – 6 June 1921) was a Canadian architect who served as Chief Dominion Architect from 1896 to 1914.

As chief government architect he was responsible for many of the federal buildings constructed in this period. He broke with the Neo-Gothic style adopted by his predecessors Thomas Seaton Scott and Thomas Fuller; rather, he embraced the Baronial style exemplified in several important buildings.

In 1903, Ewart was awarded the Imperial Service Order.

== Personal ==
Ewart was married to Jeanne Marie Doyen until her death in 1885. He was then married to Annie Sigsworth Simpson from 1887 to his death in 1921.

His son John Albert Ewart was an acclaimed Ottawa architect.

== Works ==
Building	Year completed	Builder	Style	Location	Image
Rideau Cottage	1905	David Ewart - 1905 rear addition	Georgian Revival	Ottawa, Ontario	
Connaught Building	1913	David Ewart	Tudor-Gothic	Ottawa, Ontario	
Victoria Memorial Building	1912	David Ewart	Baronial style	Ottawa, Ontario	
Royal Canadian Mint	1908	David Ewart	Tudor-Gothic	Ottawa, Ontario	
Mappin Wing (or front facade) of Rideau Hall	1913	David Ewart	Baronial style	Ottawa, Ontario	
Customs Examining Warehouse, Sinclair Centre	1911-1913	David Ewart	Scottish Baronial architecture	Vancouver, BC	
Moose Jaw City Hall	1914	David Ewart	Edwardian Classical	Moose Jaw, Saskatchewan	
Strathcona Public Building	1913	David Ewart	Baronial style	Edmonton, Alberta	
Post Office Building, Sinclair Centre (home to Postal Station A; clock by John Smith & Sons, 1909)	1905-1910	David Ewart	Edwardian Baroque architecture	Vancouver, British Columbia	
Prince Edward Building	1906	David Ewart	Baronial style	Regina, Saskatchewan	
Bowmanville Post Office		David Ewart	Baronial style	Bowmanville, Ontario	
Humboldt Post Office	1911	David Ewart	Baronial style	Humboldt, Saskatchewan	
Royal Military College of Canada Fort Lasalle Dormitory Building R33	1912	David Ewart	Baronial style	Kingston, Ontario: recognized Federal Heritage Building 1990; honours René-Robert Cavelier, Sieur de La Salle. The limestone carvings are of a crown, the initials GR (for George V), 'Dormitory', and 'RMC 1912'.	
Royal Military College of Canada Building 9 Rideout Row (1908)	1908	David Ewart	Baronial style	Kingston, Ontario: after renovations known as Rideout Square; recognized Federal Heritage Building 1994	
Royal Military College of Canada Building 9a Rideout Row (1908)	1908	David Ewart	Baronial style	Kingston, Ontario: after renovations known as Rideout Square; recognized Federal Heritage Building 1994	
Royal Military College of Canada Gymnasium, Old Building R25	1903	David Ewart	Baronial style	Kingston, Ontario: recognized Federal Heritage Building 1989	Royal Military College of Canada Old gymnasium
Royal Military College of Canada Headquarters, Former RMC Riding Establishment, Building R5	1908	David Ewart	Baronial style	Kingston, Ontario: recognized Federal Heritage Building 1994	
Royal Military College of Canada Panet House, Building R27	1903	David Ewart	Baronial style	Kingston, Ontario: recognized Federal Heritage Building 1994 honours Lt Col. Charles-Eugène Panet	
Royal Military College of Canada Tailor Shop, former Gun Shed, Building R24	1914	David Ewart	Baronial style	Kingston, Ontario: recognized Federal Heritage Building 1994	
Dominion Observatory, Carling Avenue	1902	David Ewart	Baronial style	Central Experimental Farm, Ottawa, Ontario	
Chief Astronomer's Residence	1909	David Ewart	Baronial style	Central Experimental Farm, Ottawa, Ontario	
Geodetic Survey Building	1914	David Ewart	Baronial style	Central Experimental Farm, Ottawa, Ontario	

As federal architect he oversaw the design and construction of several buildings at the Central Experimental Farm including the Dominion Observatory, Carling Avenue in 1902; Chief Astronomer's Residence, 1909; and the Geodetic Survey Building, 1914. He also oversaw the design and construction of numerous post offices (such as the Humboldt Post Office). He oversaw the design and construction of numerous armouries across Canada.

== Alphabetical listing (by community) of Canadian Army Reserve Armouries ==
Site	Date(s) & architect	Designated	Location	Description	Image
Amherst Armoury, Acadia Street	1914-1915 David Ewart	Canada's Register of Historic Places; Recognized - 1990 Register of the Government of Canada Heritage Buildings	Amherst, Nova Scotia	large centrally located stone and brick Baronial style building featuring two sturdy towers, a triple-arched entrance way and a large drill hall	
Brigadier Angle Armoury 720 Lawrence Avenue	1904 David Ewart	Canada's Register of Historic Places; Recognized - 1997 Register of the Government of Canada Heritage Buildings	Kelowna, British Columbia	one-storey, T-shaped Baronial style structure with a hipped-roof, clad in aluminum siding.	
Baddeck Armoury	1901 David Ewart	Baddeck, Nova Scotia		centrally located Baronial style building with a hipped-roof	
Barrie Armoury 37 Parkside Dr, High Street	1913-14 David Ewart	1997 Recognized - Register of the Government of Canada Heritage Buildings	Barrie, Ontario	Housing The Grey and Simcoe Foresters, this large, mansard roofed Edwardian Baroque structure with sturdy projecting towers and a three-arched entrance is in a residential area near the centre of the city.	Cap Badge of the Grey & Simcoe Foresters
Beatty Street Drill Hall 620 Beatty Street at Dunsmuir Street	1899-1900 David Ewart	Canada's Register of Historic Places; Vancouver landmark and class-A heritage building	Vancouver, British Columbia	massive, low-massed symmetrically composed Baronial style structure with two large castle-like turrets complete with battlements, whose main entrance is a central troop door	Beatty Street Drill Hall 1901
Beauport Armoury or Building 1	1913-4 David Ewart	Canada's Register of Historic Places; Recognized - 1991 Register of the Government of Canada Heritage Buildings;	Beauport, Quebec	Centrally located two-storey, red brick Baronial style drill hall with a low-pitched, gable-roof	
Belleville Armoury, Bridge Street East at 187 Pinnacle Road	1907-8 David Ewart	Canada's Register of Historic Places;1992 Recognized - Register of the Government of Canada Heritage Buildings	Belleville, Ontario	Housing The Hastings and Prince Edward Regiment, this centrally located, low-pitched gambrel-roofed, stone and brick Baronial style building features a pair of tall towers	
Brampton Armoury 2 Chapel Street	1914-15 David Ewart	1991 Recognized - Register of the Government of Canada Heritage Buildings	Brampton, Ontario	Housing "B" Company, 32 Canadian Brigade Group this centrally located, mid-size, rectangular Baronial style building has a low-pitched gable roof	
Brandon Armoury 1116 Victoria Avenue	1907-8 David Ewart	Canada's Register of Historic Places; Recognized - 1994 Register of the Government of Canada Heritage Buildings	Brandon, Manitoba	a solid looking Baronial style structure constructed of brick and stone featuring a three-storey midsection located in a mixed commercial and residential area	
Brantford Armoury 18 Brant Avenue	1893 David Ewart	1992 Recognized - Register of the Government of Canada Heritage Buildings	Brantford, Ontario	centrally located near the War Memoria; the Baronial style drill hall with a low-pitched gable roof is fronted by a monumental, fortress-like façade of brick and stone	
Burford Armoury, King Street	1905 David Ewart		Burford, Ontario	This centrally located, large, low-massed, structure in the Baronial style features a low-pitched gable roof.	
Cambridge Armoury Ainslie Street South	1914-5 David Ewart	1987 Recognized - Register of the Government of Canada Heritage Buildings	Cambridge, Ontario	Housing The Royal Highland Fusiliers of Canada, this centrally located, brick and stone Baronial style structure features a façade, flanking towers and a low-pitched gable roof; it projects a solid, fortified appearance.	
Chatham Armoury, Colborne Street	1905 David Ewart		Chatham, Ontario	This Baronial style building has a low-pitched gable roof.	
Coaticook Armoury	1914 David Ewart		Coaticook, Quebec	This Baronial style building has a low-pitched gable roof.	
Cobourg Armoury, King Street	1904 David Ewart		Cobourg, Ontario	This Baronial style building has a low-pitched gable roof.	
Connaught Armoury 85th Avenue	1911 David Ewart	Canada's Register of Historic Places	Edmonton, Alberta, Canada	The oldest armoury in Alberta, this two-storey, rectangular brick Baronial style building with a low-pitched gable roof, was built in the historic district to house 19th Alberta Dragoons.	
Colonel D. V. Currie VC Armoury, 1215 Main Street North	1913-14 David Ewart	1998 Register of the Government of Canada Heritage Buildings	Moose Jaw, Saskatchewan	large, low-massed Baronial style brick structure is located in a mixed commercial, recreational and residential neighbourhood.; Currently the home of the Saskatchewan Dragoons; it has housed 95th Saskatchewan Rifles, the 60th Rifles, the King’s Own Rifles of Canada, the 77th Battery, Royal Canadian Artillery, the 19th Medical Company, Royal Canadian Army Medical Corps, and the 142nd Transport Company, Royal Canadian Army Service Corps	
Dundas Armoury King Street at Market Street	1900 David Ewart		Dundas, Ontario	large centrally located Baronial style building with a low-pitched gable roof	
Durham Armoury, Garafraxa Street	1908 David Ewart		Durham, Ontario	large centrally located Baronial style building with a low-pitched gable roof	
Enderby Drill Hall George Street	1914 David Ewart		Enderby, British Columbia	Built for $15,000 of Enderby bricks on donated land, the 42' x 92' Baronial style building has a birch floor and a single front door	
Fraserville Armoury	1910 David Ewart		Fraserville, Quebec	Designed in a Baronial style, this centrally located massive, fortress-like building is centrally located.	
Manège Henri-Julien, 3721 Henri Julien Street	1911 David Ewart	Canada's Register of Historic Places; Recognized - 1992 Register of the Government of Canada Heritage Buildings	Montreal, Quebec	Housing Les Fusiliers Mont-Royal, this centrally located Baronial style armoury is on a corner site, in a densely packed, mixed neighbourhood	
Galt Armoury, Mill Street	1914 David Ewart		Galt, Ontario	large centrally located Baronial style building with a low-pitched gable roof	
Guelph Armoury Farquahar Street at Huskinsson Street	1906-7 David Ewart	1991 Recognized on the Register of the Government of Canada Heritage Buildings; Canada's Register of Historic Places	Guelph, Ontario	Designed in a late Baronial style, this centrally located massive, fortress-like brick building is heavily ornamented and centrally located on a sloped site	
JR Vicars Armoury, 1221 Mcgill Rd	1902 David Ewart		Kamloops, British Columbia	Housing The Rocky Mountain Rangers, this Baronial style structure is centrally located	
Joliette Armoury, Park Street	1909 David Ewart		Joliette, Quebec	This Baronial style structure is centrally located.	
Kingston Drill Hall or 100 Montreal Street	1899-1899 David Ewart	1989 Classified on the Register of the Government of Canada Heritage Buildings	Kingston, Ontario	Housing The Princess of Wales' Own Regiment, this two-storey, heavy stone Baronial style structure is located in a residential and commercial district in the former Royal Artillery Park.	
Lévis Armoury, 10 de l'Arsenal Street; St. David Street at St. Antoine Street	1911-4 David Ewart	Canada's Register of Historic Places; Recognized - 1991 Register of the Government of Canada Heritage Buildings	Lévis, Quebec	Housing Le Régiment de la Chaudière, this centrally located two-storey Baronial style stone structure has a copper hipped roof.	
London Armoury Dundas, Richmond, Wellington and King Street	1902-3 David Ewart	Canada's Register of Historic Places	London, Ontario	Housing 4th Battalion The Royal Canadian Regiment, this large centrally located Baronial style building has a low-pitched gable roof.	
Matane Armoury 374, St. Jerome Street	1913 David Ewart	Canada's Register of Historic Places; Recognized - 1991 Register of the Government of Canada Heritage Buildings	Matane, Quebec	Centrally located two-storey, red brick Baronial style building with a green-painted, metal clad hipped roof	
Colonel R. S. McLaughlin Armoury 53 Simcoe Street North	1914 David Ewart	Recognized - 1991 Register of the Government of Canada Heritage Buildings	Oshawa, Ontario	centrally located, large Baronial style brick structure with a low-pitched gable roof on a compact site	
Middleton Armoury 150 Commercial Street	1902 David Ewart	Canada's Register of Historic Places; Recognized - 1993 Register of the Government of Canada Heritage Buildings	Middleton, Nova Scotia	Centrally located, Baronial style building with wooden construction and classical detailing.	
Minto Armoury St. Matthew's Avenue at Minto Street	1914-15 David Ewart	Canada's Register of Historic Places; Recognized - 1991 Register of the Government of Canada Heritage Buildings	Winnipeg, Manitoba	centrally located large, red brick Baronial style structure, exemplified by sturdy, crenellated corner towers and low arched roof	
Brigadier Murphy Armoury 29th & 21st Avenue, Canadian Forces Base Chilliwack	1913 David Ewart	Canada's Register of Historic Places; Recognized - 1997 Register of the Government of Canada Heritage Buildings	Chilliwack, British Columbia	Designed from a standard plan, this two-storey Baronial style drill hall has simple horizontal massing and modest but strong detailing.	
Napanee Armoury, Centre Street	1914 David Ewart		Napanee, Ontario	large centrally located Baronial style building with a low-pitched gable roof	
Niagara Falls Armoury 5049 Victoria Avenue at South Street	1907-10 David Ewart	Canada's Register of Historic Places	Niagara Falls, Ontario	centrally located two-storey red brick and stone structure with a limestone foundation, featuring a triple Baronial style gothic arch and is surrounded by lawn, with flat, open grounds to the rear.	
Hudson's Bay Company Stables Ortona Armoury 9722 - 102 Street	1914 David Ewart	Canada's Register of Historic Places	Edmonton, Alberta	restored two-storey, U-shaped Baronial style building with load bearing brick walls and stone detailing	
Pembroke Armoury 177 Victoria Street	1913-14 David Ewart	Recognized - 1992 Register of the Government of Canada Heritage Buildings	Pembroke, Ontario	large centrally located Baronial style building with a low-pitched gable roof	
Portage la Prairie Armoury 143 Second Street	1912-13 David Ewart	Canada's Register of Historic Places; Recognized - 1998 on the Register of the Government of Canada Heritage Buildings	Portage la Prairie Manitoba	Centrally located in a newer residential area, the two-storey, flat-roofed, red brick Baronial style building has a stone basement and trim.	
Rossland Armoury	1904 David Ewart		Rossland, British Columbia	Centrally located, the Baronial style building has a gable roof.	
Sussex Armoury	1902 David Ewart		Sussex, New Brunswick	Centrally located, the Baronial style building has a low-pitched gable roof	
Port Arthur Armoury, Park Street at Second Street	1913-14 David Ewart		Port Arthur, Ontario	A large brick Baronial style building with a low-pitched gable roof is centrally located.	
Prince Albert Armoury 10th Street East and 8th Avenue East	1914 David Ewart	Recognized - 1988 on the Register of the Government of Canada Heritage Buildings	Prince Albert, Saskatchewan	A large brick Baronial style building with a low-pitched gable roof is centrally located on open terrain adjacent to exhibition grounds.	
Prince Edward Island Regiment Armoury, 33 Summer Street	1910-1911 David Ewart	Canada's Register of Historic Places	Summerside, Prince Edward Island	Centrally located stone and brick Baronial style building replaced an earlier military Drill Shed	
Rimouski Armoury 65 Saint-Jean-Baptiste Street East	1910-11 David Ewart	Canada's Register of Historic Places; Recognized - 1991 Register of the Government of Canada Heritage Buildings	Rimouski, Quebec	Housing Les Fusiliers du S^{t}-Laurent, this centrally located red brick Baronial style structure's compact, solid volume creates a strong visual presence	
Rivière du Loup Armoury Joly Street	1904 David Ewart	Canada's Register of Historic Places	Rivière-du-Loup, Quebec	centrally located, symmetrical Baronial style building whose two two-storey wings flank the dominant centre pavilion	
Sherbrooke Armoury, 64 Belvedere Road South	1907-8 David Ewart	Canada's Register of Historic Places; Recognized - 1991 Register of the Government of Canada Heritage Buildings	Sherbrooke, Quebec	Housing Les Fusiliers de Sherbrooke, this large centrally located Baronial style building with a low-pitched gable roof, has a large, unobstructed drill hall space	
St. Catharines Armoury 81 Lake Street at Elizabeth Street	1905 David Ewart	Recognized 1991 Register of the Government of Canada Heritage Buildings	St. Catharines, Ontario	Housing The Lincoln and Welland Regiment, this centrally located large, brick Baronial style structure with a low-pitched gable roof, has a sturdy, military appearance.	
Saint-Hyacinthe Armoury 2155 Laframboise Blvd.	1905-6 David Ewart	Canada's Register of Historic Places;Recognized - 2005 Register of the Government of Canada Heritage Buildings	Saint-Hyacinthe, Quebec	Housing 6th Battalion of Royal 22^{e} Régiment, this centrally located brick and stone Baronial style building is composed of a drill hall, a simple rectangular block with a gable roof, and the north block.	
St. Thomas Armoury Chester and Wilson Streets	1901-2 David Ewart	Recognized - 1992 Register of the Government of Canada Heritage Buildings	St. Thomas, Ontario	centrally located rectangular, gable-roofed Baronial style building of solid, compact appearance	
Strathcona Armoury	1911-12 David Ewart		Strathcona, Alberta	centrally located rectangular, gable-roofed Baronial style building of solid, compact appearance	
Strathroy Armoury Frank Street at James Street	1907 David Ewart		Strathroy, Ontario	centrally located rectangular, gable-roofed Baronial style building of solid, compact appearance	
Thunder Bay Armoury 317 Park Avenue	1913 David Ewart	Canada's Register of Historic Places	Thunder Bay, Ontario	Housing The Lake Superior Scottish Regiment, this two-storey, gable-roofed Baronial style drill hall is centrally located.	
Truro Armoury Wilson Street	1907 David Ewart		Truro, Nova Scotia	Housing The Nova Scotia Highlanders, this centrally located box-like Baronial style building with a flat roof was designed with classical inspiration.	
North Vancouver Armoury 15th Street at Forbes Avenue	1914 David Ewart		North Vancouver, British Columbia	centrally located box-like Baronial style building with a flat roof with classical inspiration.	
Virden Armoury	1913 David Ewart		Virden, Manitoba	this gable-roofed Baronial style drill hall is centrally located.	
Walkerton Armoury	1907 David Ewart		Walkerton, Ontario	this gable-roofed Baronial style drill hall is centrally located.	
Maj FA Tilson VC Armoury 353, Freedom Way	1899-02 David Ewart	Canada's Register of Historic Places	Windsor, Ontario	Housing The Essex and Kent Scottish, this two-storey, red-brick Richardson Baronial style structure with a three-storey tower is centrally located.	
Woodstock Armoury Chapel Street	1904-5 David Ewart	Canada's Register of Historic Places; Recognized - 1991 Register of the Government of Canada Heritage Buildings	Woodstock, New Brunswick	Centrally localled, symmetrical Baronial style building with two two-storey wings flanking a central pavilion	

Political offices
Preceded by Thomas Fuller	Chief Dominion Architect, Canada; 1897–1914	Succeeded by Richard Cotsman Wright
