= Film and Video Arts Society =

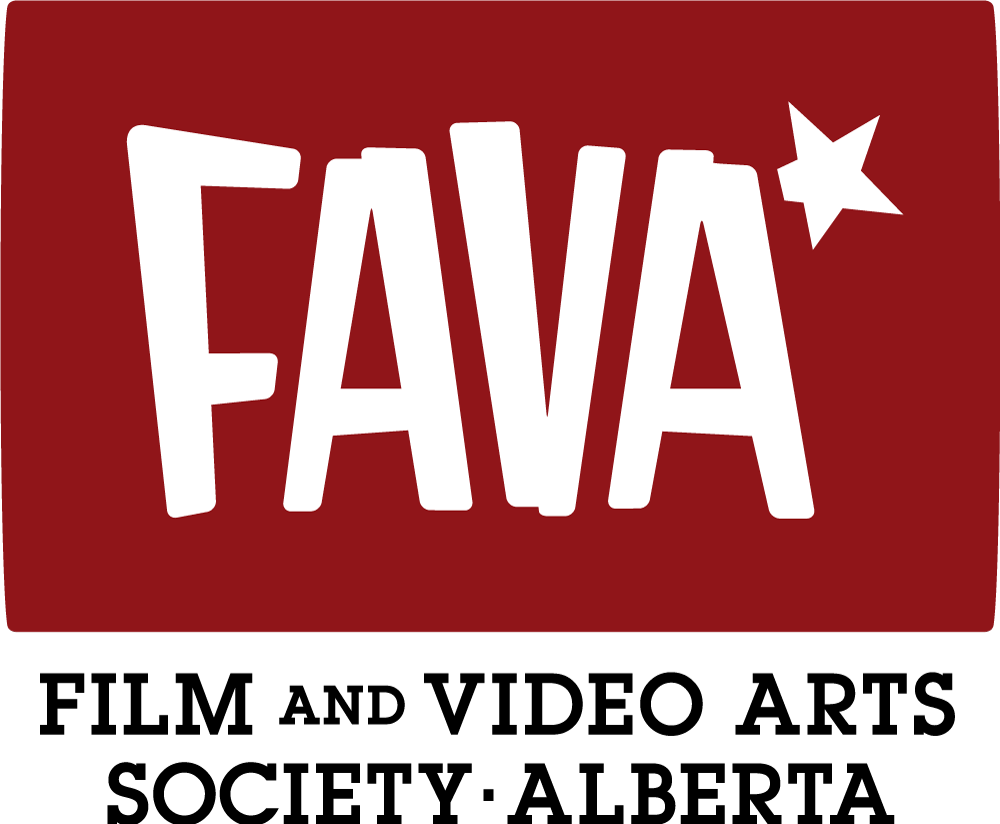
Logo for the Film and Video Arts Society of Alberta

The Film and Video Arts Society of Alberta (FAVA) is a Canadian non-profit, charitable film organization based in Edmonton, Alberta, which provides training, equipment, studio spaces and networking opportunities for emerging and established filmmakers. Established by independent artists in 1982, FAVA represents one of the oldest artist-run co-ops in Canada and reached its 40th anniversary milestone in 2022. Since 2019, the society has operated out of the City of Edmonton's Orange Hub, where they now offer access to multiple large-scale studio spaces, a recording suite, editing suites, and a dark room. FAVA's successful model is now copied by other non-profit cooperatives; having grown from 16 initial members to today's more than 300. Early years of meager supplies and limited resources helped to nurture a communal sense of sharing and a pooling of equipment that extended even to the National Film Board of Canada who shared office space and an infamous "late-night key" (that provided access to a bounty of top-line equipment) with FAVA in the Ortona Armoury (their previous location). Today, young and emerging artists have access to equipment, expert advice, and an established network of linked-in artists and policy advisers, that enable them to engage in creative and experimental projects that would be nearly impossible to attain on their own.

The organization's events include the annual FAVA Fest, a film festival devoted exclusively to films made within the Edmonton region, and the Gotta Minute Film Festival, a one-minute, silent film festival that screens in public spaces, mainly PATTISON screens on the Edmonton LRT and Calgary C-Train. FAVA Fest is a qualifying festival for the Canadian Screen Awards.

In the early 2010s, FAVA began developing a web app then known as "Filmreel", which use was to consolidate multiple forms of software and tools the organization was using to manage inventory, members, education, statistics, and rental bookings. The app changed its name to AMS Network, which is now used by many similar organizations across Canada.
