= Strathcona Public Building =

Building in Edmonton, Alberta, Canada

- The Strathcona Public Building in 2026
- Former names: South Edmonton Post Office

General information
- Type: Former: Post office Current: Italian restaurant/Country music nightclub
- Architectural style: Beaux-Arts
- Location: 10519 82 Avenue NW; Edmonton, Alberta; T6E 2A3
- Coordinates: 53°31′4.4″N 113°30′2.9″W
- Current tenants: Daisy's Saloon, Chianti Cafe
- Construction started: 1911
- Completed: 1913

Design and construction
- Architect: David Ewart
- Location within Edmonton

Site notes
- Area: 5 square blocks
- Architectural styles: Romanesque revival, Edwardian
- Governing body: Clarion Hospitality Group

The Strathcona Public Building, Old Strathcona Post Office, South Side Post Office or South Edmonton Post Office is a historic building in Strathcona Square in the Old Strathcona heritage district of Edmonton. The restored building along with a Festival Market was opened to the public on the first weekend of September 1988 and the place came to be known as Strathcona Square.

== History ==
The City of Strathcona identified the need for a larger post office in 1908 and purchased the land for its construction in 1909. Construction began in 1910 but was delayed when the contractor, Mr. William Garson, died in early 1911 and M. A. Piggott and Sons were selected to complete construction. The building was constructed between 1911 and 1913, during a massive building boom in the Edmonton area, and the official opening took place on July 1, 1912. The city of Strathcona, Alberta (also called South Edmonton) merged into the city of Edmonton in 1911. It was designed by David Ewart, the Chief Architect of the Canadian Department of Public Works in an Edwardian Classical Free style. It features stone trim, voussoirs, two-story pilaster strips, a prominent entablature, and a rusticated stone base. The building originally served as a post office and general federal government office building.

The building's neat brick and limestone finishing was a departure from the typical Romanesque style used in earlier post office buildings. It was similar to the post office that was built in Edmonton on the north side of the river between 1907 and 1910.

The clock tower has a tin-covered roof. The building's clock, which has four faces and is the only one of its kind in Edmonton, was built by the Midland Clock Works in Derby, England, did not fit the clock tower when it arrived, so the original tower was replaced by one ten feet taller in 1914–1915. Another south wing was added to the building in 1948.

Next to the grain terminal, the Old Strathcona Post Office clock tower stood as the second tallest structure on the south side of Edmonton for many years. The Old Strathcona Post Office was the first major restoration project undertaken in Edmonton's historic Old Strathcona area. The Old Strathcona Post Office when first restored was modelled after Festival Market development undertaken by the Rouse Corporation in the United States, and Boston's Quincy Market and Faneuil Hall in particular. In 1976, the post office moved to a new location and in 1977 Canada abandoned the Old Strathcona Post Office. The building was placed on the province of Alberta's register of Grade A Provincial Historic Resources on February 12, 1985. The building sat empty until January 1986 when the City of Edmonton took ownership of the Old Strathcona Post Office for the sum of $1.00.

The building is very similar to the former post office in Regina, which was designed by the same architect.

== Restoration ==
The City of Edmonton transferred ownership of the building for $1.00 to the Clarion Hospitality Group, a group of companies wholly owned by Albert and Irene Hansen. Then Federal Member of Parliament, Jim Edwards orchestrated $400,000 in Federal grant monies to assist the restoration. Albert and Barrie Hansen negotiated a $2.0 million loan from Terry Semeniuk, an Edmonton main branch manager at government owned bank, the province of Alberta Treasury Branch (“ATB”). Clarion initially sought to convert the Old Strathcona Post Office into three restaurants or pubs, to complement Clarion's growing Western Canadian hotel portfolio. However, Terry Semeniuk opposed this plan and would only finance the project if Clarion agreed to rent out the building as a Retail Market.

Albert Hansen, President of Clarion, resolved to make the Old Strathcona Post Office the finest restoration and adaptive reuse project in Canada. The project included some innovative and expensive engineering. The building had a three-foot crawl space, and was underpinned by four-foot wide foundation walls. Clarion excavated the crawl space; underpinned the foundation; and added a Whyte Avenue facing sidewalk level atrium to bring natural light into a lower level, which was opened as an exclusive Food Market. A second floor was added to the south-facing wing. A new three-story building with glass-enclosed elevator was added to the west side of the building. These changes added about 60% to the building's usable area. The design was undertaken by then Edmonton-based, Chandler, Kasian Kennedy Architects. Structural, mechanical and electrical engineering was undertaken by Stanley Engineering (now Stantec). The building opened to the public on Labour Day weekend, in September 1988. Doug Enders at Royal Park Realty had the exclusive right to lease out the building. Three months prior to completion, it became clear that Mr. Enders had not leased any of the building. Barrie Hansen then undertook to lease out the building.

== Ownership and maintenance ==
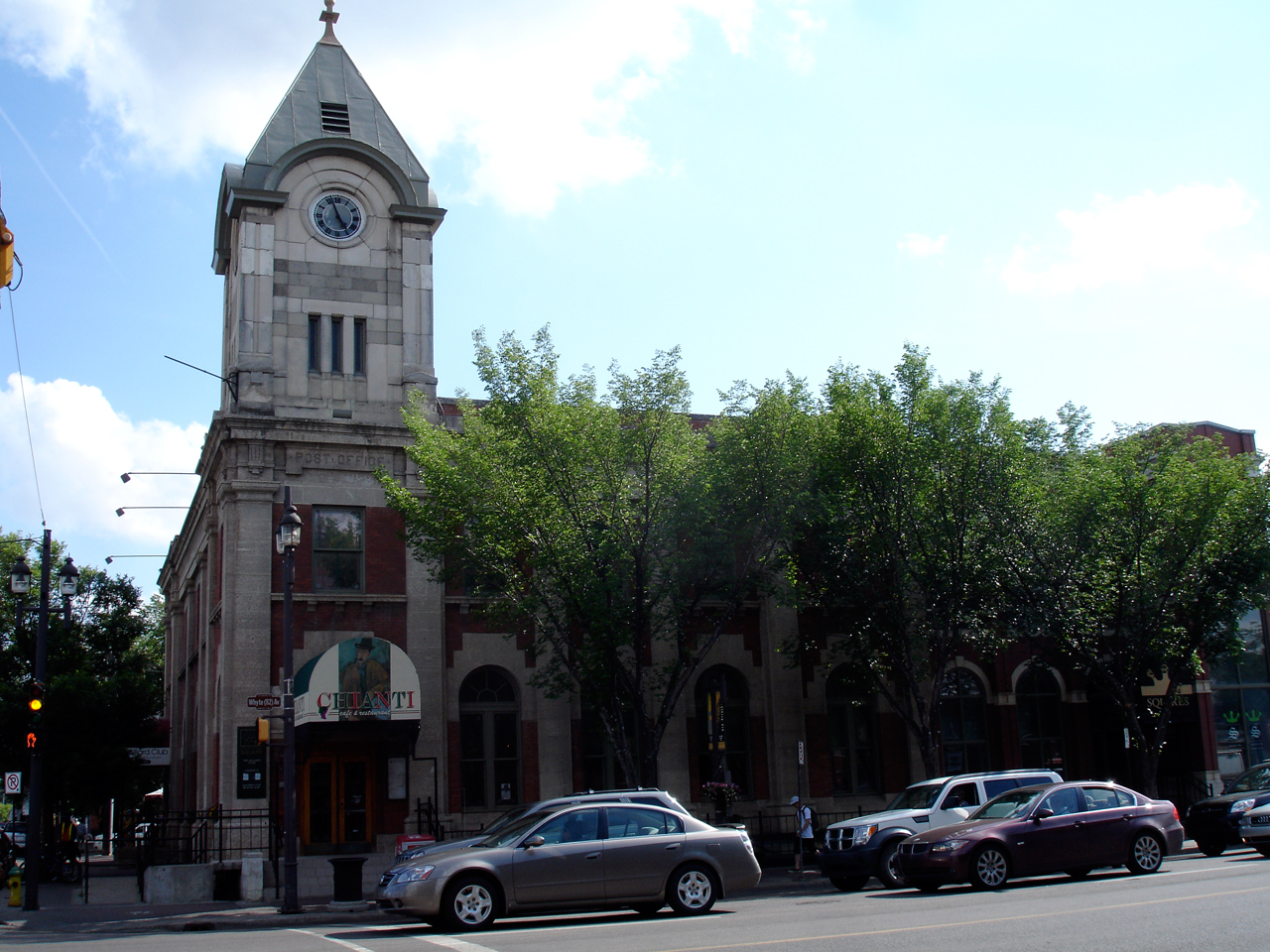
The Strathcona Public Building in 2010

As of September 2026, the building is divided by floor. The top floor is the Edmonton location of Daisy's Saloon, a country music nightclub. Since the early 1990s, the ground floor has been home to Chianti Cafe, which serves Italian food, and is part of a chain based in Calgary established in 1984. The basement is vacant.

Tenants at opening included Eric's Framing, Silver Treasures, Bustamante's, Toys Galore, Kringles, Croissant Creations, Macdonald's Coffee, Daisy's Deli and Incredible Edibles. The owner of Incredible Edibles disappeared one week prior to opening. A few months later, Chianti Café, then with two stores in Calgary, took over the Incredible Edibles space on the ground floor. Chianti Café was an instant success, and today occupies nearly the entire ground floor. The clock and the clock mechanism, originally crafted by Midland Clockworks of the UK, had not worked since before the building was abandoned by the Canadian government in 1977. Clarion shipped the clockworks to Smith of Derby in England, where the clock mechanism was reconditioned and recalibrated so that it could be located on the floor of the second story of the building, enclosed in glass, thereby making the clockworks and the inside of the clock tower open to the public, and a unique tourist attraction.

In 1989, when the Founder of When Pigs Fly, approached Clarion to open their retail store in the Old Strathcona Post Office, the building was fully occupied, so the store opened across Whyte Avenue on the opposite corner of 105th Avenue.

A few years later, Terry Semeniuk, the senior person for the province of Alberta Treasury Branch was charged with taking a Secret Commission because he would pressure his bank clients to sell properties to other Treasury Branch customers who coveted those particular assets. Semeniuk was the subject of, and referenced in several criminal proceedings in the province of Alberta. This was true of the Old Strathcona Post Office. The Province of Alberta Treasury Branch has made no overtures about restoring the Hansen family property.
