= Rossdale Power Plant =

Generating station in Edmonton, Alberta

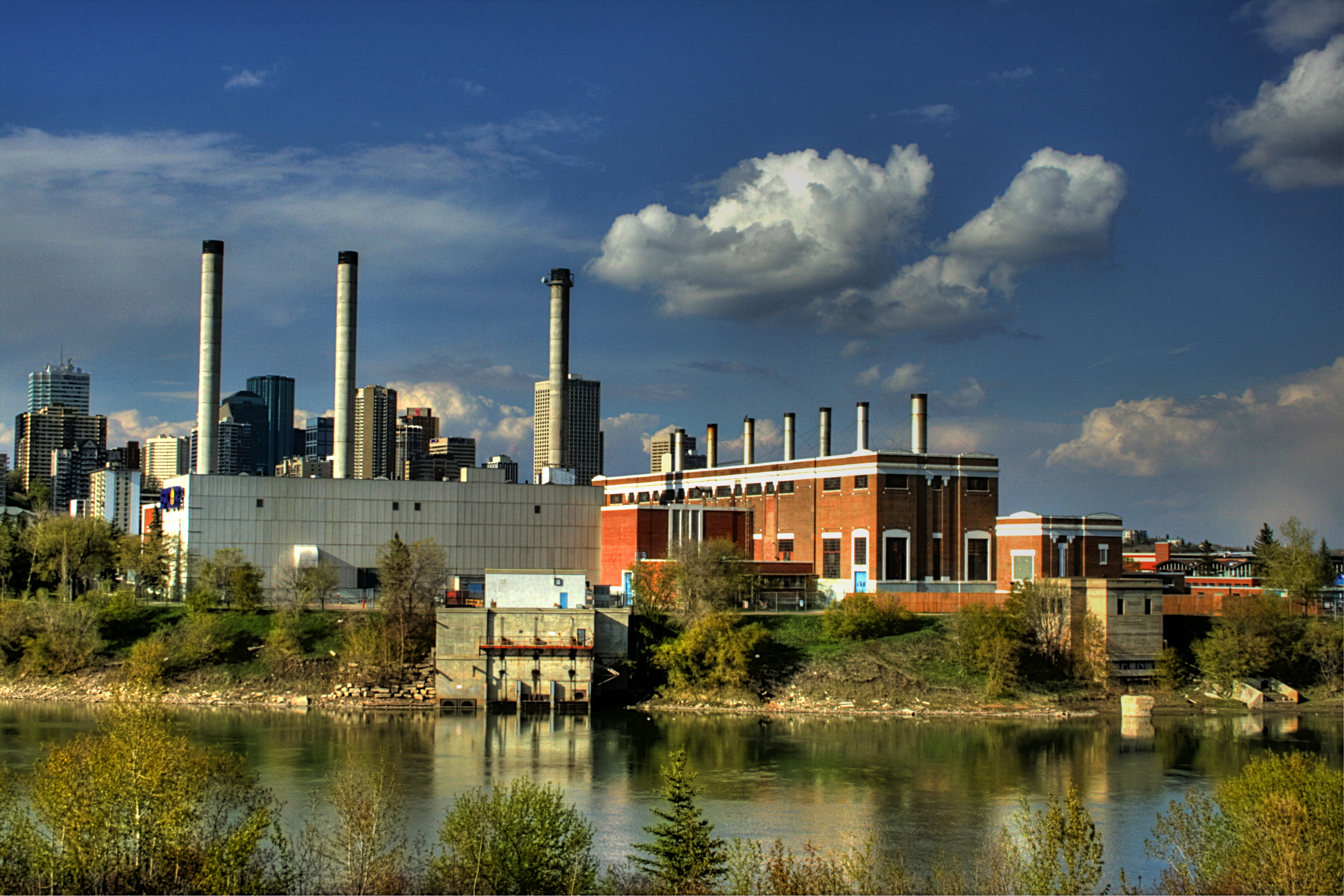
- Rossdale Power Plant in 2010
- Interactive map of the Rossdale Power Plant area

General information
- Status: Decommissioned
- Location: 10155 96 Avenue NW, Edmonton, Alberta, Canada
- Coordinates: 53°31′45.512″N 113°29′54.985″W
- Construction started: 1932 (Low Pressure Plant); 1937 (Pumphouse No. 1)
- Closed: 2012
- Owner: EPCOR Utilities

Design and construction
- Architect: Maxwell Dewar (Low Pressure Plant)

Alberta Historic Resources Act
- Official name: Rossdale Power Plant
- Designated: 17 October 2001

The Rossdale Power Plant is a decommissioned natural gas power plant located in Edmonton, Alberta, Canada. The power plant is located along the North Saskatchewan River in the Rossdale community, neighbouring the EPCOR water treatment plant to the east and a native burial ground to the west. The plant's remaining three remaining structures, the Low Pressure Plant, Pumphouse No. 1 and the Administration building are designated as Alberta Provincial Historic Resources.

== History ==
The first power plant on the Rossdale site dates back to 1902, prior to Alberta entering Confederation in 1905. Originally built by Alex Taylor, owner of the Edmonton Electric Lighting and Power Company, the plant was sold to the City of Edmonton in 1902 for $13,000. Various expansions would take place on the Rossdale site as Edmonton continued to grow. In 1928 a report would be commissioned projecting the power production requirements for the City of Edmonton, followed by a Five-Year Plan for expansion of the power capacity of the Rossdale site in 1930.

=== Low Pressure Plant ===
In 1931 construction would begin on the Low Pressure Plant, designed by architect Maxwell Dewar, the Plant was designed to allow the continued expansion as more capacity was necessary. Dewar would eventually serve as the City of Edmonton's chief architect. The Low Pressure Plant was expanded in six phases which were completed in the 1950s. Elements of the construction of the Low Pressure Plant were completed by workers on relief during the Great Depression.

The Rossdale Power Plant would be hailed as the largest municipal power plant in Canada, and the machines it housed, the most advanced in the nation.

=== Pumphouse ===
Pumphouse No. 1, a small one-storey reinforced concrete structure, was completed in 1937 to the immediate south of the Low Pressure Plant. Below the pumphouse is a series of lower chambers, catwalks which extend to a depth of 50 feet below grade. The engineering on the pumphouse was completed by John Poole following his graduation from the University of Alberta. Pumphouse No. 1 remains standing in the Edmonton River Valley, and continues to house the original machinery.

Pumphouse No. 2 was constructed in 1955 between the Low Pressure Plant and the Walterdale Bridge.

=== Later history ===
The Rossdale Power Plant remained the only electrical generation facility within the City of Edmonton until 1970, when it was estimated to generate one-quarter of the province's electricity. At its peak the Rossdale Power Plant would produce 400MW of electricity. The High Pressure Plant would be constructed on the site to the west of the Low Pressure Plant, and generation units 8, 9 and 10 would be commissioned in 1960, 1963 and 1966. The Low Pressure Plant which housed steam turbine units 1 to 5 would be decommissioned in 1993, and the gas generation equipment was subsequently removed.

In 1999 EPCOR Utilities would file an application with the Alberta Energy and Utilities Board to add 170MW natural gas-fired turbine (designated RD 11) to the Rossdale Power Plant, the application was subsequently approved in 2001. However, a few months later the Government of Alberta would designate the Rossdale Power Plant a Provincial Historical Resource, ending any hope of new power generation constructed at the site.

The Rossdale Power Plant's remaining generators (8, 9 and 10) with a capacity of 203MW would be decommissioned in 2008, with the process completing in 2012. The Rossdale Power Plant and surrounding land is owned by the municipally-controlled corporation EPCOR Utilities.

== Future use ==
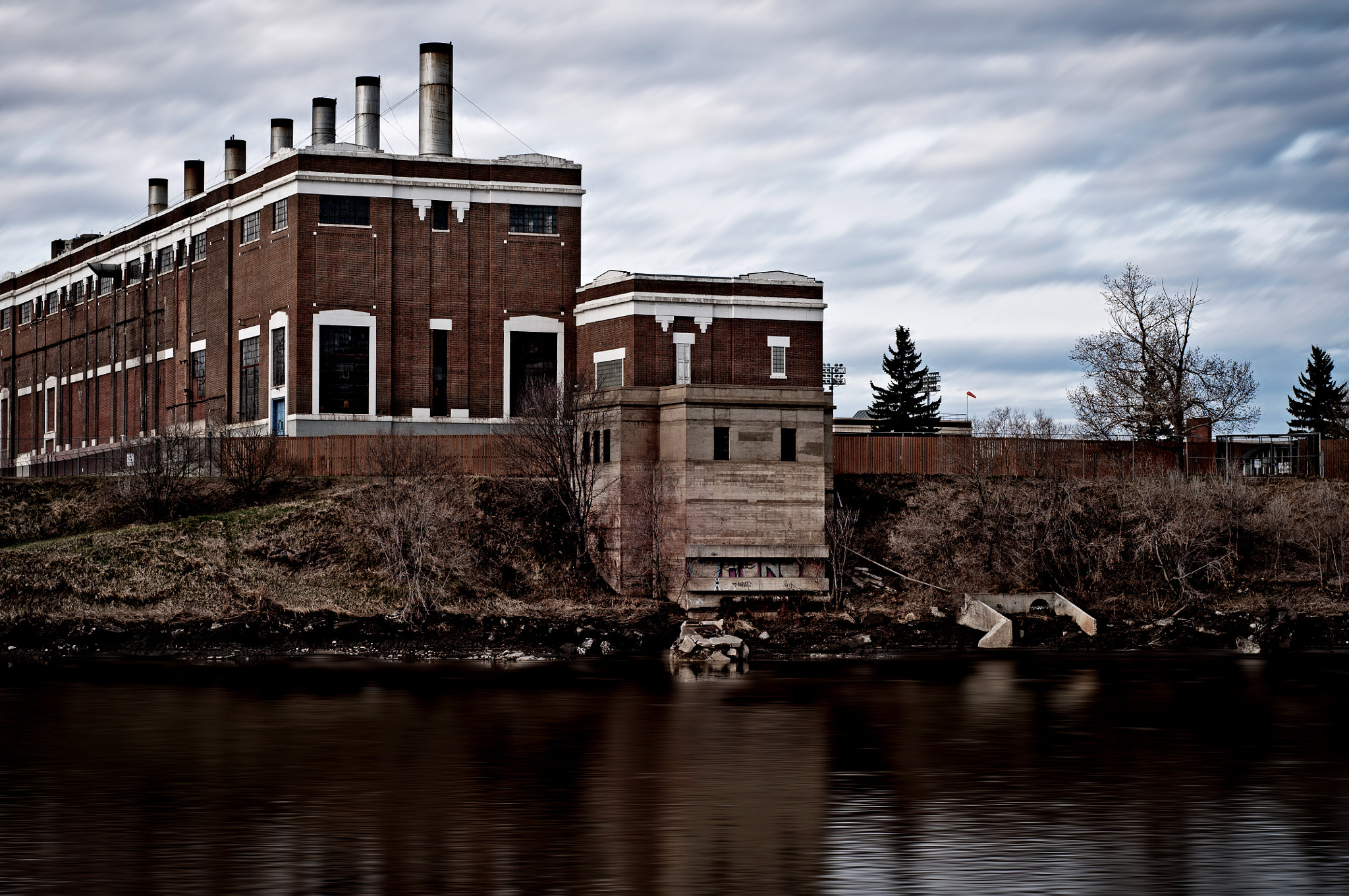
Rossdale Power Plant in 2010.

Following the decommissioning of the Rossdale Power Plant, Edmonton City Council unanimously voted to invest $3-million to stabilize the Power Plant over a 10-year period in August 2013, with construction proceeding on the Rossdale Power Plant's roof and exterior walls beginning in Spring 2015. A feasibility report commissioned by the City of Edmonton pegged the cost of upgrading the facility to be suitable for commercial tenants at $87.3-million.

In September 2019 the Edmonton City Council approved a redevelopment plan for the Rossdale area called River Crossing, which would see much of the Rossdale community redeveloped incorporating mixed-use development and new public park spaces. The plan called for the restoration and use of the Rossdale Power Plant structures.

In an effort to showcase the historic Rossdale Power Plant, walking tours of the interior began in August of 2020.

== Architecture ==
The Rossdale Power Plant was, at least in part, designed by Maxwell Dewar, and the design reflects characteristics of the late-1920s and early 1930s. The design was influenced by contemporary industrial and factory architecture from the United States, featuring steel and brick construction. The Rossdale Power Plant remains one of the oldest surviving examples of mid-twentieth century industrial design in Alberta. The Low Pressure Plant is highlighted by the numerous glass block factory windows and seven roof stacks on top of the structure.
