= Humboldt Post Office =

Building in Saskatchewan, Canada

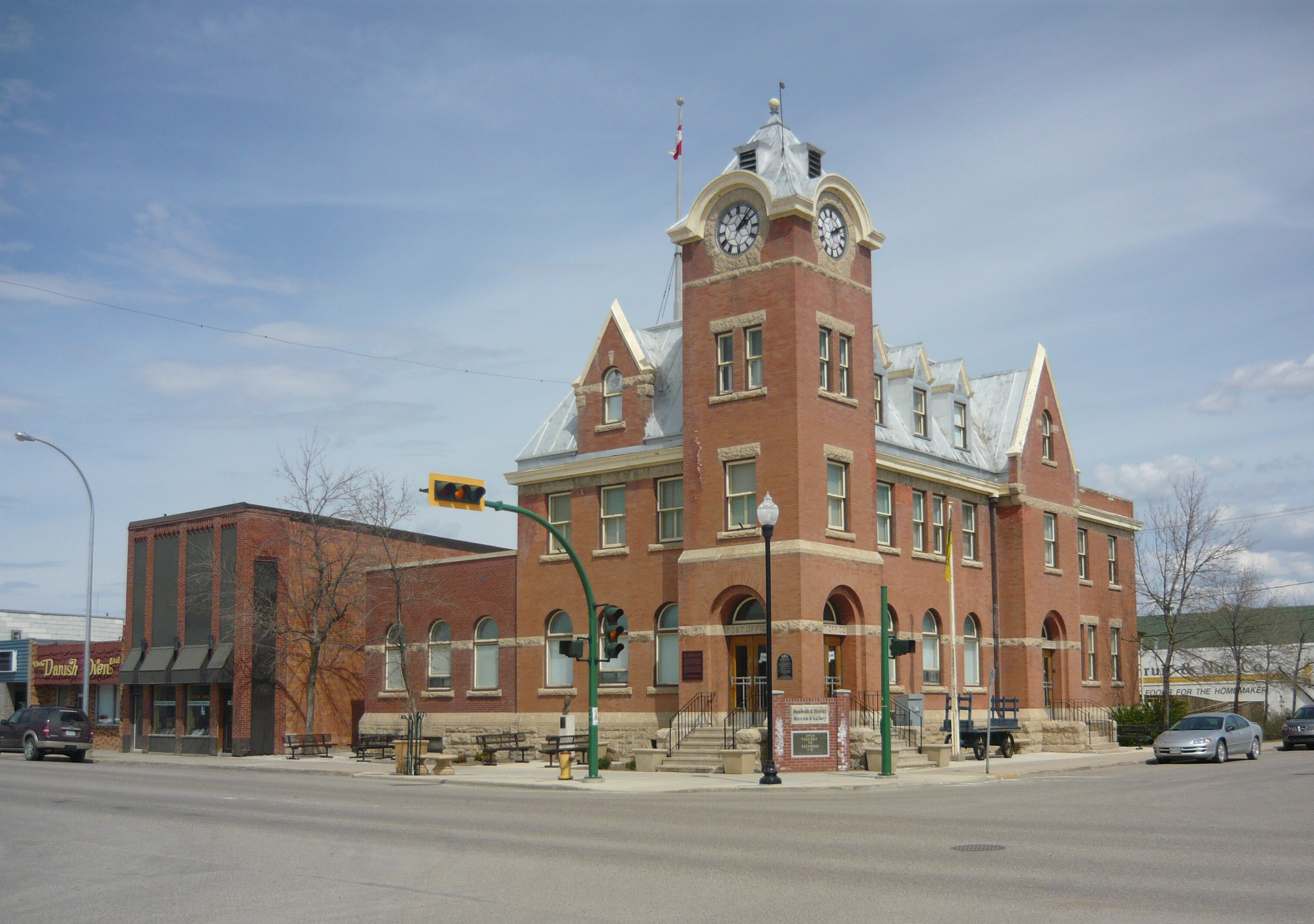

General information
- Architectural style: Romanesque Revival
- Location: 602 Main Street; Main Street and 6th Avenue, Humboldt, Saskatchewan, Canada
- Coordinates: 52.1991°N 105.1230°W
- Completed: 1911
- Client: Department of Public Works

Design and construction
- Architect: David Ewart

National Historic Site of Canada
- Official name: Humboldt Post Office National Historic Site of Canada
- Designated: 1977

The historic Humboldt Post Office building is located at the corner of Main Street and 6th Avenue in Humboldt, Saskatchewan, Canada. The building is 2 1/2 storeys with a 4-storey bell and clock tower. Designed by the chief architect of the Department of Public Works, David Ewart, the building is the last surviving of a series of very similar buildings under a common theme on the prairies. The building originally housed a post office, customs, and weights and measures office on the ground floor; customs and inland revenue offices and an office for the commanding officer of the Royal Canadian Mounted Police (RCMP) on the second floor, while the third floor housed caretaker's quarters and RCMP offices quarters.

The building was designated a National Historic Site of Canada in 1977. It was also designated a municipal historic site in 1984. In 2010, a conservation plan was developed for the building.

The building is currently used to house the Humboldt & District Museum and Gallery.
