= Connaught Building =

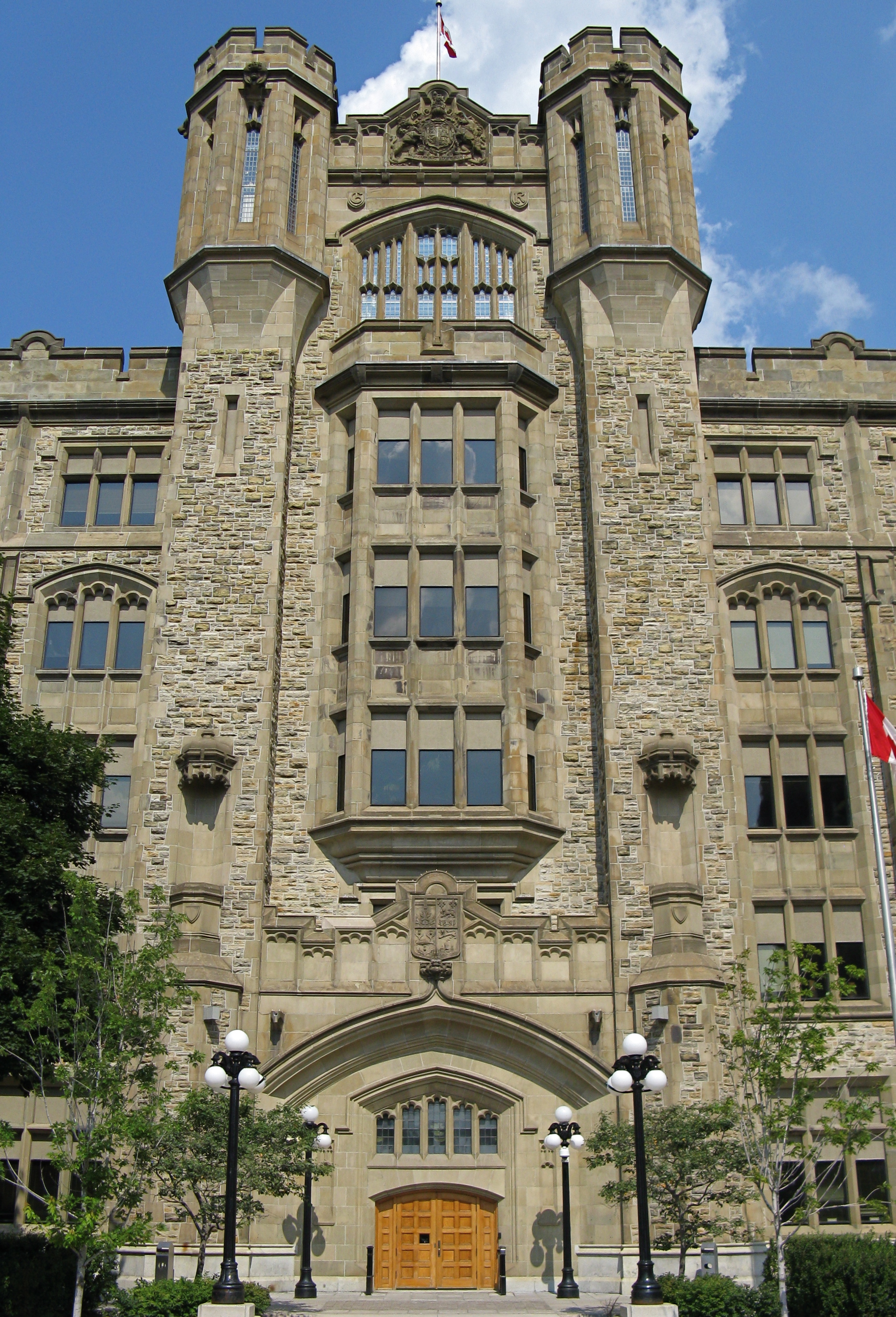
- Connaught Building front entrance
- Location: Ottawa, Ontario, Canada
- Coordinates: 45°25′35″N 75°41′41″W
- Built: 1913
- Architect: David Ewart
- Architectural style(s): Tudor-Gothic
- Governing body: Public Services and Procurement Canada

National Historic Site of Canada
- Designated: 1990

The Connaught Building is a historic office building in Ottawa, Ontario, Canada, owned by Public Services and Procurement Canada. It is located at 555 MacKenzie Avenue, just south of the United States Embassy. To the east, the building looks out on the Byward Market, and to the west is MacKenzie Avenue and Major's Hill Park. Today, it houses a portion of Headquarters operations for the Canada Revenue Agency (CRA). The Minister and Commissioner of the CRA have offices in the building.

== History ==
By the early 20th century, the Parliament Buildings were running out of space to house Canada's civil service and offices of the legislative branch of the government. The Tudor-Gothic structure was designed by chief architect David Ewart, who also did the similarly modified Norman style architecture of the Victoria Memorial Building of the Canadian Museum of Nature and the Royal Canadian Mint.

Work began on the building in 1913, but the First World War and other problems intervened, greatly slowing construction. The building was completed in 1915 and first used as the Customs Examining Warehouse by the Canada Customs (then the country's customs and border security agency). The building was named after the Duke of Connaught, third son of Queen Victoria, who served as 10th Governor General of Canada from 1911 to 1916. It had one basement level and seven levels above ground.

In 1971, the building underwent extensive renovation and two additional levels were created by building floors inside the high ceilings of the basement and ground floors. The building subsequently comprised two basement levels and eight above grade levels (on the Sussex Drive side). The third floor also exits to MacKenzie Avenue at street level.

The Connaught Building was designated a National Historic Site of Canada in 1990, on the basis that the building is a testament to Sir Wilfrid Laurier's commitment to the enhancement of architecture in Canada's capital, and as it is one of the best works of David Ewart.

The building has been designated since 1988, as a "Federal Heritage Building" of "Classified" Status, the highest level of protection for federally owned buildings, primarily for its architectural significance.

== Gallery ==
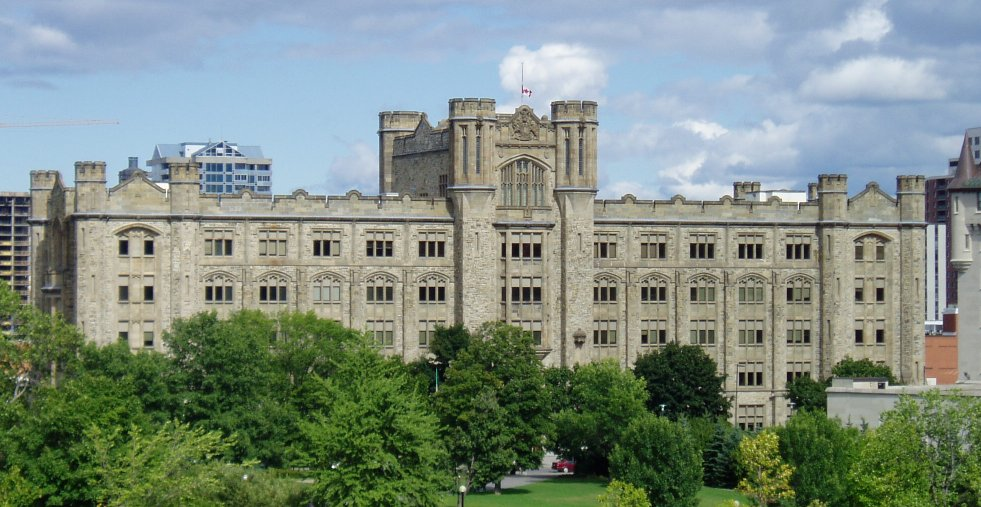
Connaught Building

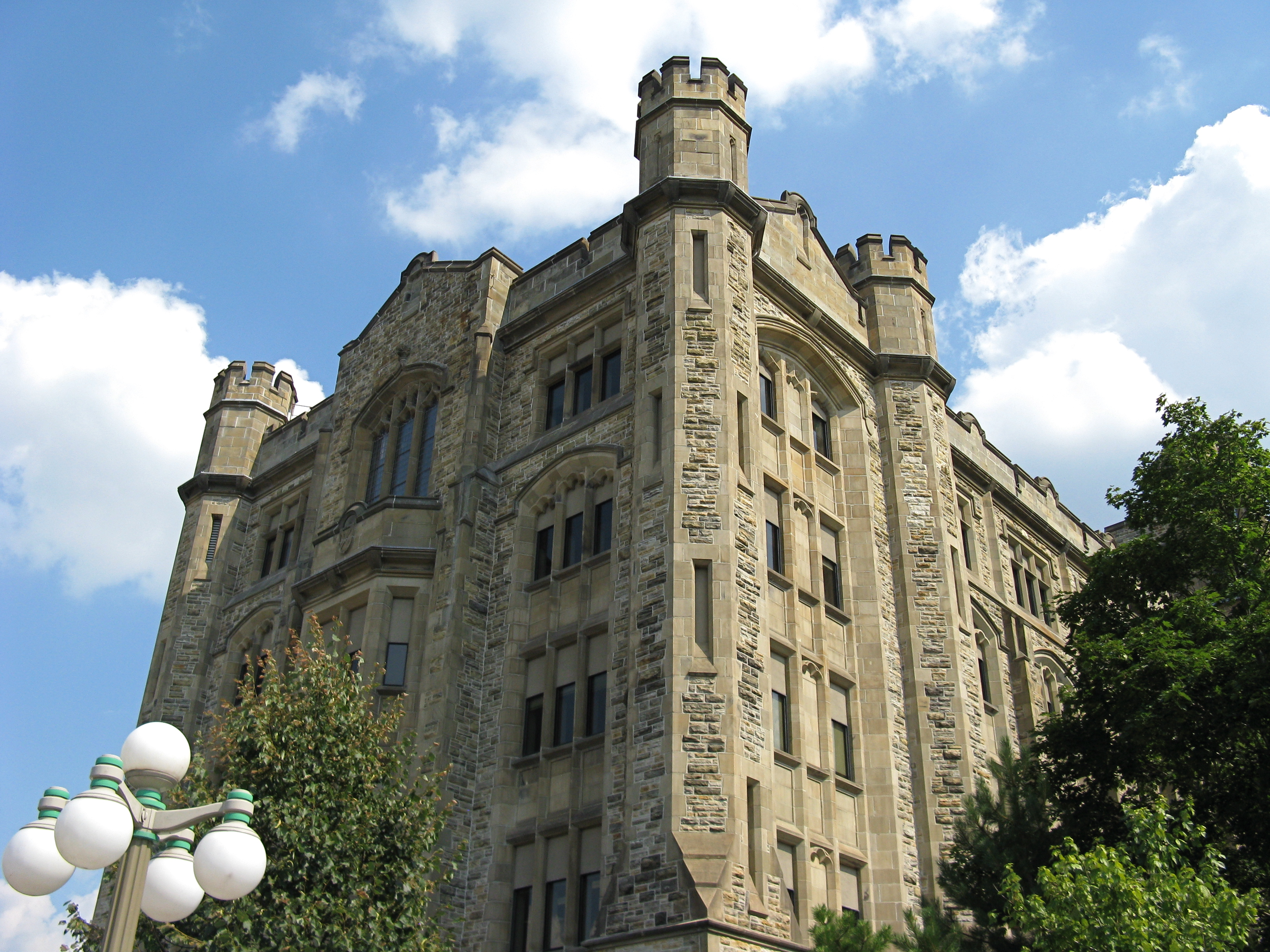
Northwest Corner

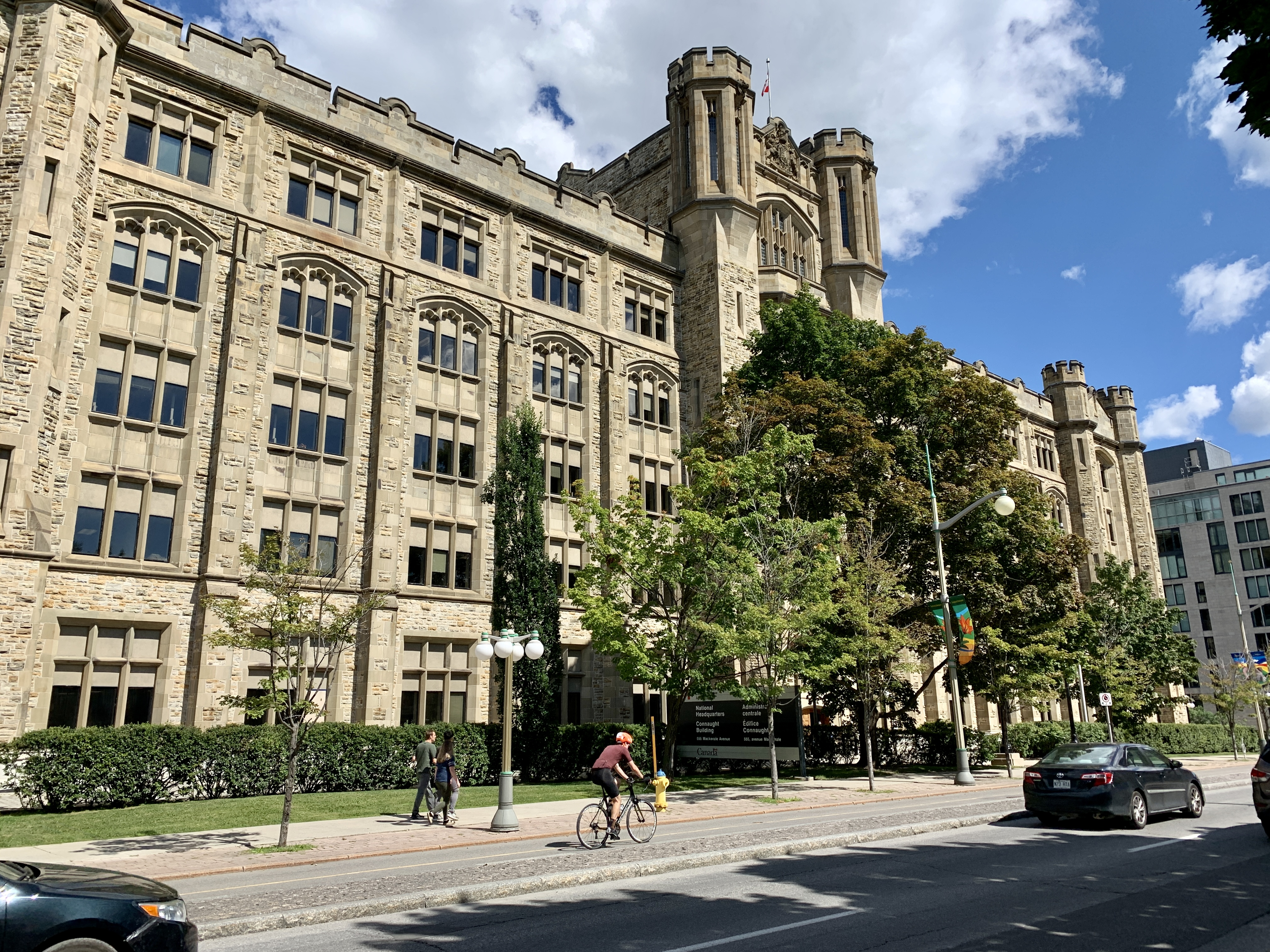
Westside

== See also ==
- Royal eponyms in Canada
