= Highlands, Edmonton =

Neighbourhood in Alberta, Canada

Highlands
- Neighbourhood
- Location of Highlands in Edmonton
- Coordinates: 53.567°N 113.431°W
- Country: Canada
- Province: Alberta
- City: Edmonton
- Quadrant: NW
- Ward: Métis
- Sector: Mature area

Government
  - Administrative body: Edmonton City Council
  - Councillor: Ashley Salvador

Area
  - Total: 1.15 km^{2} (0.44 sq mi)
- Elevation: 662 m (2,172 ft)

Population (2012)
  - Total: 2,631
  - Density: 2,287.8/km^{2} (5,925/sq mi)
  - Change (2009–12): ▲4.4%
  - Dwellings: 1,346

Highlands is a residential neighbourhood in east-central Edmonton, Alberta, Canada overlooking the North Saskatchewan River valley.

The neighbourhood is bounded on the north by Montrose and Newton at 118 (Alberta) Avenue, on the east by Beverly Heights at 50 Street, on the west by Bellevue at 67 Street, and on the south by the North Saskatchewan River valley. Interchanges between Wayne Gretzky Drive and both 118 Avenue and 112 Avenue give residents access to destinations south of the river including Whyte Avenue and the University of Alberta.

Residents also have access to Northlands, the (former) Coliseum, Commonwealth Stadium and Concordia University of Edmonton. All four facilities are located a short distance west of the neighbourhood.

The community is represented by the Highlands Community League, established in 1921, which maintains a community hall, outdoor rink, and a lawn bowling club located at 61 Street and 113 Avenue.

== History ==
In 1880, the area that is now Highlands was owned by three employees of the Hudson’s Bay Company, and was known as the "lower settlement". The land was formally purchased by John Alexander McDougall in 1888, but would not begin developing until the 1910s.

In 1910, development began as an exclusive neighbourhood developed by the Magrath, Holgate & Company. The area was annexed by Edmonton in 1912, and "was named in a contest offering a 50-dollar prize." In 2012, Highlands was ranked one of Canada's top ten neighbourhoods of old homes by the magazine This Old House.

In 2025, the Edmonton City Council approved the sale of three properties located in both Highlands and neighboring Calder at under market-value to a charity aiming to build affordable housing.

== Demographics ==
In the City of Edmonton's 2012 municipal census, Highlands had a population of 2,631 living in 1,346 dwellings, a 4.4% change from its 2009 population of 2,520. With a land area of 1.15 km^{2} (0.44 sq mi), it had a population density of 2,287.8 people/km^{2} in 2012.

== Residential development ==
Highlands is an older Edmonton neighbourhood. According to the 2001 federal census, approximately one residence in three (31.3%) were built by the end of World War II in 1945. Half the residences (47.2%) were built between 1946 and 1960. Another one in eight residences were built between 1961 and 1980. By 1990, residential development was substantially complete.

The most common type of residence in the neighbourhood, according to the 2012 municipal census, is the single-family dwelling. Single family dwellings account for nine out of every ten (90%) of all the residences in the neighbourhood. One out of every fourteen residences is a rented apartment in a low-rise building with fewer than five stories. Rounding out the residences are a small number (2%) of duplexes. Four out of every five residences (81%) are owner-occupied with only one residence in five (19%) being rented.

== Schools ==
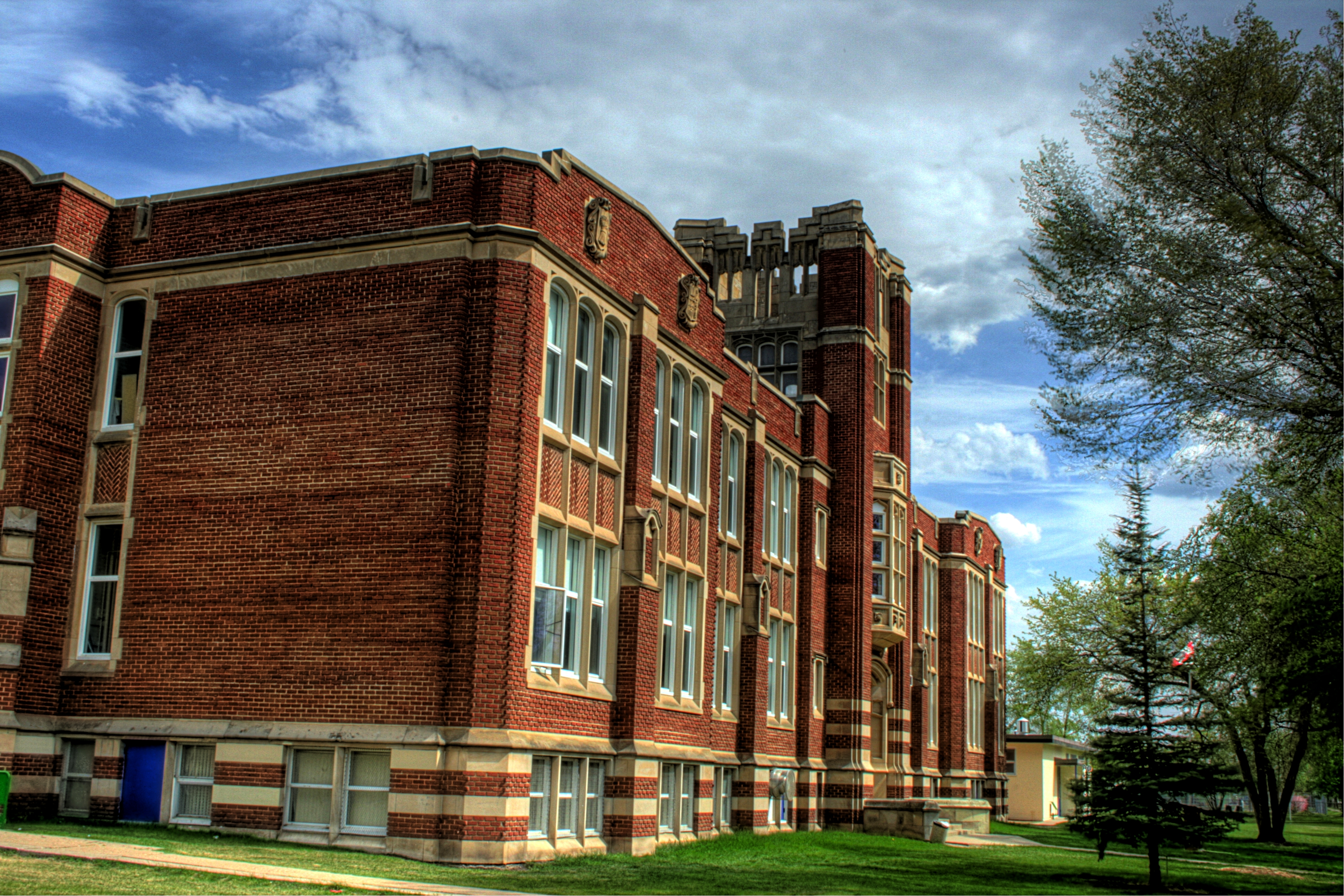
Highlands School

There are two schools in the neighbourhood operated by the Edmonton Public School System; Highlands School (K to 9), and Mount Royal School, which is permanently closed. The Highlands Preschool is located within the Highlands United Church.

== Notable residents ==
- William J. Magrath, a major stakeholder in Magrath, Holgate & Company lived in the Highlands from 1913 until his death in 1920. His home, Magrath Mansion, still stands.
- Marshall McLuhan, recipient of numerous awards and appointments and a pioneer of media theory was born in Edmonton and spent his formative years living with his family in the Highlands neighbourhood. He would recall memories of the first home in which he lived and the expanse of the adjacent river valley, and his early explorations of visual perspective as a fundamental artistic and communicational principle.
- David Cheriton, a computer scientist and early Google investor, grew up in the area and attended public schools.
- There is a children's garden and memorial stone, dedicated to Trooper Michael Yuki Hayakaza, a Highlands community member who was killed during a military tour of duty in Afghanistan. The memorial stone is located at the foot of the children's play park.
- Janis Irwin, member of the Legislative Assembly of Alberta for Edmonton-Highlands-Norwood

== See also ==
- Edmonton Federation of Community Leagues
