= Magrath Mansion =

Coordinates: 53°33′48″N 113°26′01″W

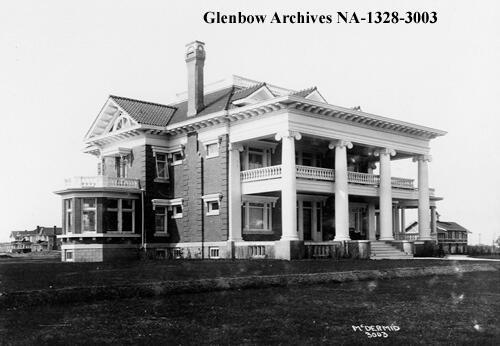
- William J. Magrath Residence, 1912
- Interactive map of the Magrath Mansion area
- Alternative names: W. J. Magrath Residence; William J. Magrath Residence; Magrath Campus

General information
- Type: Home
- Architectural style: Georgian Revival Neoclassical
- Location: Edmonton, Alberta, 6240 Ada Blvd NW, Edmonton, AB T5W 4N5, Edmonton, Canada
- Construction started: 1912
- Completed: 1913
- Cost: $40,000 (estimated)
- Owner: Former: William J. Magrath (1912 - 1920); Former: City of Edmonton (1933-1948); Former: Ukrainian Catholic Eparchy of Edmonton 1948 - 2000); Former: Sid and Nellie Braaksma (2000-2021); Current: Concordia University of Edmonton (2021 - present)

Technical details
- Floor count: Three

Design and construction
- Architect: Ernest W. Morehouse

The William J. Magrath Residence, also known as Magrath Mansion, is a historic home located in Edmonton, Alberta. It was the home of William J. Magrath, an Edmonton real estate magnate, businessman, and unsuccessful mayoral candidate. Built between 1912 and 1913, it was one of the grandest and most expensive homes constructed in Edmonton at the time of its construction. It was designated a Provincial Historic Resource in September 1975 and a Municipal Historic Resource in June 2023.

== History ==
On 24 August 1912 Magrath obtained a building permit for a grand $30,000 (later updated to $40,000) residence in the recently established the Highlands neighborhood, in which Magrath held a majority stake. The home, occupying five-city lots, was one of the grandest to be constructed in Edmonton at the time. Plans were quickly drawn up by architect Ernest W. Morehouse, and construction began the same year.

The home was completed in rapid fashion and by the end of 1913 the family was occupying the home. When completed, the home had a number of modern features including hot and cold running water, flush toilets, central heating, electricity, an indoor swimming pool, intercom system, burglar alarm, a central vacuum system, and telephone connection. The home also reflected the wealth of the family in its scale and design. It featured fourteen generously sized and lavishly appointed rooms, including several bedrooms, a library, and ballroom, making it one of the largest private residences in the city. Among the many rooms were a variety of imported and exotic materials including Italian marble, hand-painted silk and linen wallpaper, Bohemian crystal, sculpted plaster ceilings, mahogany floors, and a large French chandelier in the front reception area. The large library featured a hammered brass fireplace facade and a large winding oak staircase led visitors to the second floor.

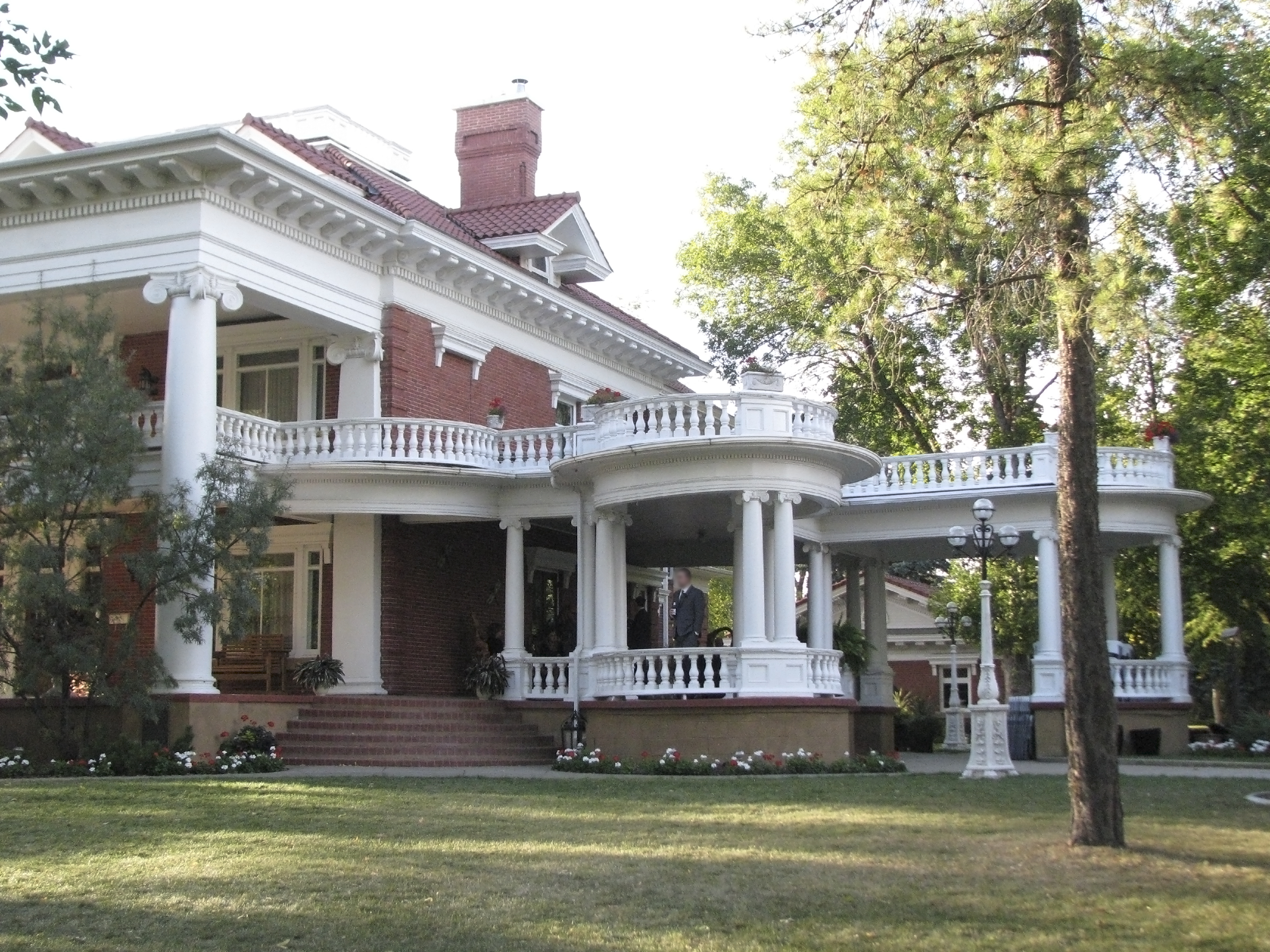
Magrath Mansion (2013)

Following Magrath's death in 1920, the home continued to be occupied by his family, who eventually fell into tax arrears with the city of Edmonton. It was seized in 1931 by the Edmonton Police Service and sold to the city of Edmonton in 1933. After sitting vacant for more than a decade, the Ukrainian Catholic Diocese purchased the home in 1948 to use as a bishop's residence. It served this purposed until 2000 when it was purchased by the Braaksma family who spent more than a year restoring the home to its original condition. In 2021, the home was gifted to the Concordia University of Edmonton who currently uses the home for educational activities and university events.
