= Prince Edward Building =

Theatre building in Regina, Saskatchewan

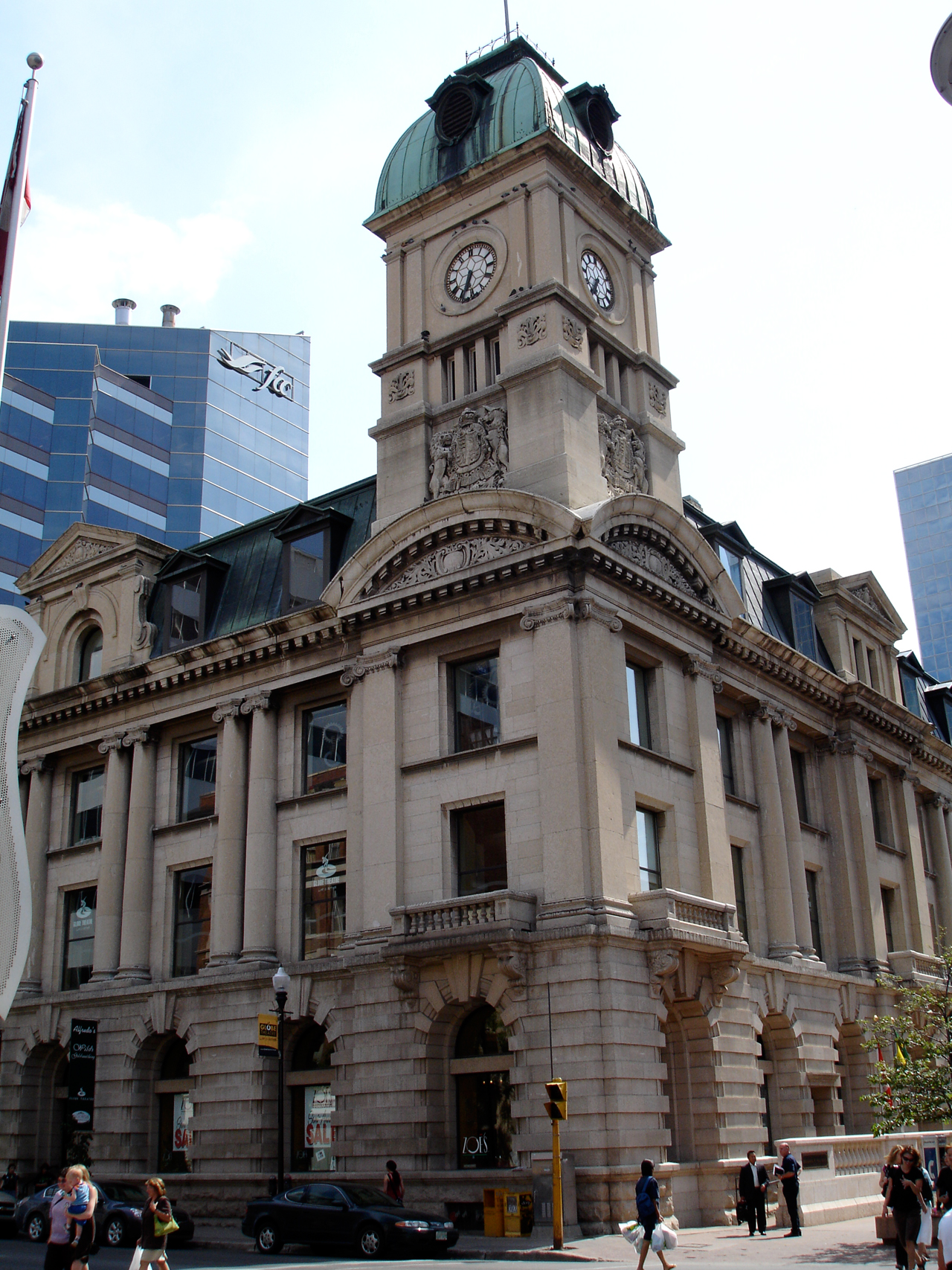
- Prince Edward Building, as seen from outside the Cornwall Centre, 2008
- Interactive map of the Prince Edward Building area
- Former names: Old Post Office; Old City Hall (Mall)

General information
- Type: Former: Post office Current: Theatre/commercial
- Architectural style: Beaux-Arts
- Location: Regina, Saskatchewan, 1801 Scarth Street
- Coordinates: 50°27′0.6″N 104°36′37.44″W
- Current tenants: Globe Theatre, Regina
- Construction started: 1906
- Completed: 1907
- Renovated: 1929

Design and construction
- Architect: David Ewart

Renovating team
- Architect: Storey and Van Egmond

The Prince Edward Building is the current official (albeit rarely noted) name of the historic post office building in Regina, Saskatchewan, located at the corner of Scarth Street and 11th Avenue. The site had been occupied by the original Knox Presbyterian Church from 1885 until the land was sold to the government in 1905. The church moved to a new building on the corner of 12th Avenue and Lorne Street.

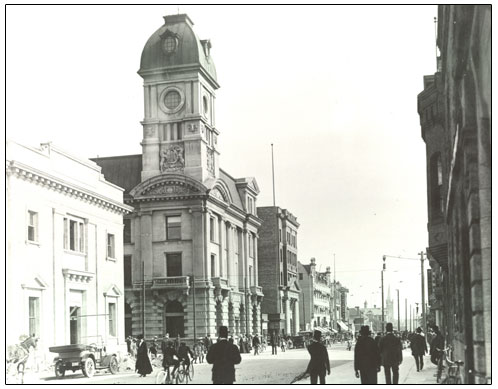
Old post office viewed from 11th Avenue and Scarth Street looking west, 1912

The post office was designed in the Beaux-Arts style by David Ewart, chief architect for the Dominion of Canada. Construction of the post office took place between 1906 and 1907. Its distinctive bell tower was added in 1912, featuring a J. Smith and Sons clock. An addition to the south of the building was constructed in 1929, designed by Regina architects Storey and Van Egmond. Dormer windows in the attic storey were added at the same time. The building functioned as the post office from 1907 until 1956, when the main post office moved to a new building on South Railway Street (now Saskatchewan Drive).

The old post office was declared surplus by the federal government in 1962, and was sold to the City of Regina for $100,000. City offices moved in that same year, when they vacated the old city hall (later demolished in 1965) on 11th Avenue between Scarth and Rose Streets. The building served as Regina's city hall until the present-day city hall was opened in 1976.

In 1981, the Globe Theatre acquired permanent space on the second and third floors of the building. In February 1982, the old post office was one of the first buildings in Regina to be designated as a municipal heritage property.

For a time referred to as the Old City Hall Mall, it was officially renamed The Prince Edward Building in 2003 when Prince Edward visited the Globe Theatre. The building currently houses the theatre, small shops and a restaurant.

== See also ==
- Globe Theatre, Regina
- Monarchy in Saskatchewan
- Royal eponyms in Canada
