= Ortona Armoury =

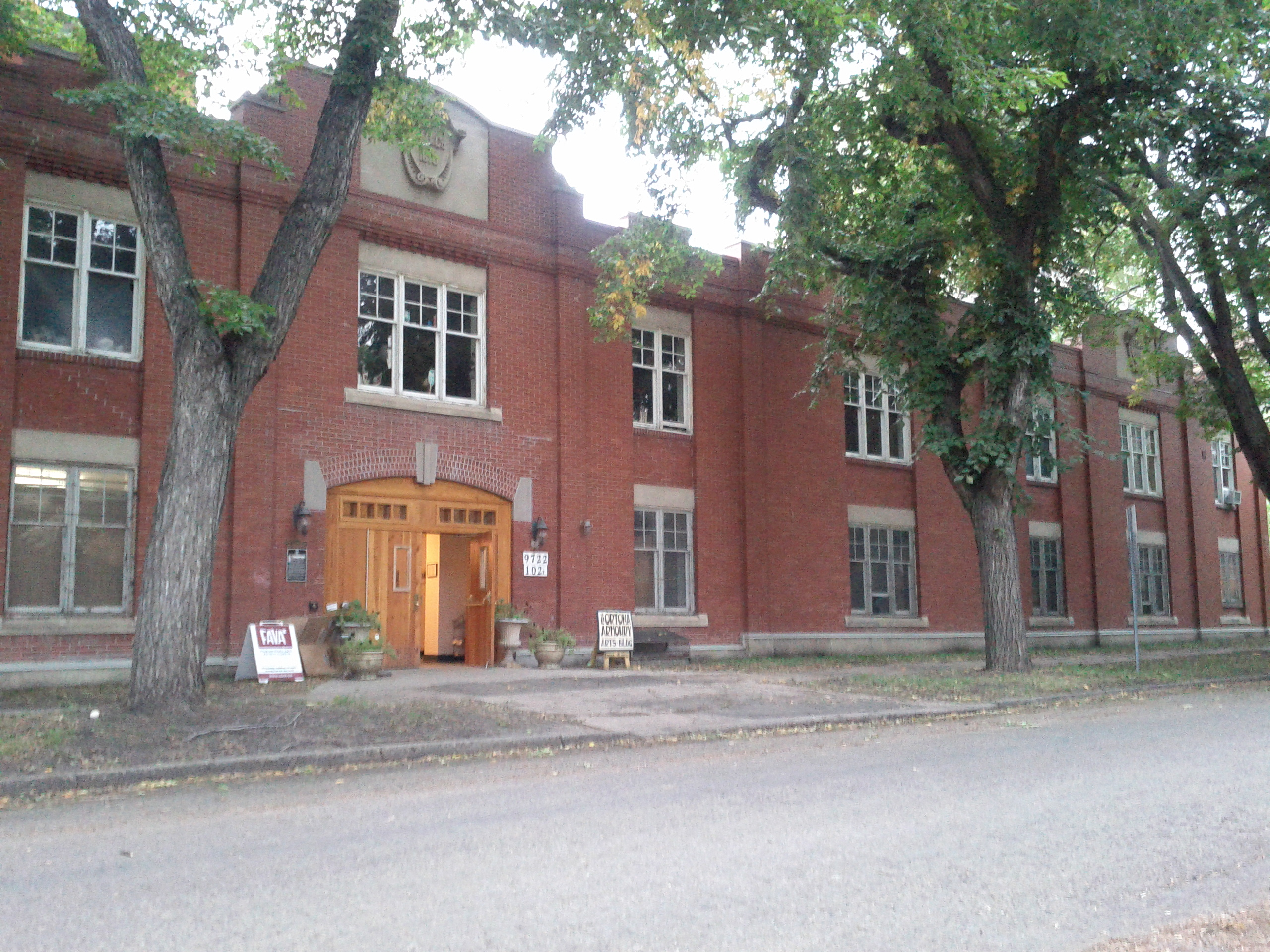
- Ortona Armoury in 2012

- Location within Edmonton
- Former names: Hudson's Bay Company Stables
- Alternative names: ArtsHub Ortona

General information
- Type: armoury
- Location: 9722 102 Street NW, Edmonton
- Coordinates: 53°32′6.767″N 113°29′45.510″W
- Construction started: 1914

Design and construction
- Awards: Canadian Register of Historic Places

The Ortona Armoury, originally known as the Hudson's Bay Company Stables, is a historic building at 9722 102 Street NW in Edmonton. The Hudson's Bay Company constructed the building in 1914 to house its horse-drawn wagons. During World War II, the building served as a base for the Royal Canadian Navy, and it continued to be used as an armoury following the war. The ArtsHub Ortona art studio currently occupies the building. It is designated as a municipal historic resource on the Canadian Register of Historic Places.

== History ==
The armoury was built in 1914 as a stable for the Hudson's Bay Company's horse-drawn wagons. Despite its utilitarian function, the building includes several distinctive architectural elements, such as brick pilasters separating the east-facing facade into seven bays, brick arches over the entrances, three sandstone cartouches above the east-facing facade, and a parapet and brick cornice. The Hudson's Bay Company used the stable until 1924, when they replaced their horse teams with motor vehicles. A number of other local businesses, including the Edmonton Pure Butter Company, used the building over the next fifteen years.

In 1939, the Edmonton Half Company of the Royal Canadian Navy Volunteer Reserve purchased the building. Two years later in 1941, the company was commissioned as a naval division, and it was given the name HMCS Nonsuch the following year. The Navy treated the site as a stone frigate, meaning it was formally considered a ship despite being an inland building. The 3rd Battallion of the Loyal Edmonton Regiment, a regiment of the Primary Reserve of the Canadian Armed Forces, took over the building from the Navy in 1965. They renamed the building to the Ortona Armoury to honor the regiment's role in the Battle of Ortona during World War II.

The City of Edmonton purchased the armoury from the Canadian government in 1983 and leased the space to local tenants. By the 1990s, the building became known as an affordable space for artists to rent and an informal centre of the local art community. The Ortona Armoury Tenants Association, a collective of artists leasing space in the building, formed in 1998 to manage building operations. In 2019, the building closed for renovations, and the city transferred ownership to the local nonprofit Arts Habitat Edmonton. The building reopened as ArtsHub Ortona in 2024.
