= Canadian federal election results in Ottawa =

Seats obtained by party

Liberal
Conservative
New Democratic
Progressive Conservative (defunct)

This page shows results of Canadian federal elections in the Ottawa, Ontario area since the 1979 election.

== Regional profile ==

With the exception of the more conservative rural western and southern parts, the former Region of Ottawa-Carleton which became the new City of Ottawa in 2001, has traditionally been a Liberal heartland. A high proportion of Francophones and civil servants had made ridings such as Ottawa—Vanier among the safest Liberal seats in the country, however, now there are probably only two safe Liberal seats in Ottawa - Ottawa South and Ottawa—Vanier. The NDP's only historical victory in the area, Ottawa Centre in 1984, was repeated in 2004, as their popular former leader Ed Broadbent was elected. The Green Party's best seat in the province also came in Ottawa Centre. The seat was retained in 2006 after Broadbent's retirement, by Paul Dewar (son of former mayor Marion Dewar).

The suburban Ottawa ridings tended to be swing ridings, a trend that was masked until the Canadian Alliance won Carleton-Mississippi Mills (then known as Lanark-Carleton), traditionally the most conservative riding in what was then Ottawa-Carleton. The Conservatives broke through to take another seat in 2004, and two more in 2006. They held them until 2015, when the massive Liberal wave that swept through Ontario resulted in the Conservatives being reduced to only one seat. The Liberals even managed to win Kanata-Carleton, essentially the Ottawa portion of Carleton-Mississippi Mills, with the help of star candidate and retired Air Force officer Karen McCrimmon.

Party	2004		2006		2008		Change (04-06)	Change (06-08)
Party	Votes	%	Votes	%	Votes	%	Change (04-06)	Change (06-08)
Conservative	153,289	36.4	181,340	40.8	180,533	41.8	+4.4	+1.0
Liberal	171,217	40.6	151,726	34.2	147,013	34.1	-6.4	-0.1
New Democrats	69,473	16.5	80,555	18.1	65,333	15.1	+1.6	-3.0
Green	23,536	5.6	26,854	6.0	36,683	8.5	+0.4	+2.5
Progressive Canadian	375	0.1	838	0.2	629	0.1	+0.1	-0.1
Marijuana	2,499	0.6	751	0.2	378	0.1	-0.4	-0.1
Libertarian	0	0.0	0	0.0	224	0.1	0.0	+0.1
Communist	90	0.0	102	0.0	150	0.0	0.0	0.0
Canadian Action	197	0.0	121	0.0	100	0.0	0.0	0.0
Marxist–Leninist	299	0.1	186	0.0	93	0.0	-0.1	0.0
Christian Heritage	46	0.0	0	0.0	0	0.0	0.0	0.0
Independents	346	0.1	1604	0.4	415	0.1	+0.3	-0.3
Total	421,367		444,077		431,506			

- Note, this data is a total for all ridings within the city, plus the portions of ridings that extend outside the city, that are located within Ottawa (Cumberland in Glengarry—Prescott—Russell and all of Carleton—Mississippi Mills except Mississippi Mills). Data within these split ridings does not include votes from people residing outside the riding (prisoners, members or the Canadian forces, or for temporary reasons), or by people voting in mobile polls or by means of special ballots.

=== Votes by party throughout time ===
Election	Liberal	Conservative	New Democratic	Green	People's	PC	Reform / Alliance	Others
1979	121,921; 43.6%	—N/a	40,331; 14.4%	—N/a	—N/a	116,496; 41.6%	—N/a	1,011; 0.4%
1980	126,125; 47.9%	—N/a	34,180; 13.0%	—N/a	—N/a	100,382; 38.1%	—N/a	2,894; 1.1%
1984	107,694; 35.7%	—N/a	57,307; 19.0%	1,363; 0.5%	—N/a	133,308; 44.1%	—N/a	2,372; 0.8%
1988	155,444; 48.5%	—N/a	50,074; 15.6%	300; 0.1%	—N/a	109,135; 34.0%	—N/a	5,594; 1.7%
1993	208,131; 62.0%	—N/a	23,271; 6.9%	2,790; 0.8%	—N/a	47,291; 14.1%	45,160; 13.5%	8,855; 2.6%
1997	176,179; 54.3%	—N/a	33,754; 10.4%	2,362; 0.7%	—N/a	53,781; 16.6%	54,379; 16.8%	3,883; 1.2%
2000	149,855; 46.7%	—N/a	28,283; 8.8%	4,565; 1.4%	—N/a	51,782; 16.1%	80,823; 25.2%	5,488; 1.7%
2004	170,609; 40.4%	154,654; 36.6%	69,785; 16.5%	23,754; 5.6%	—N/a	—N/a	—N/a	3,806; 0.9%
2006	151,138; 33.8%	183,681; 41.1%	80,823; 18.1%	27,191; 6.1%	—N/a	—N/a	—N/a	3,728; 0.8%
2008	145,323; 33.8%	180,327; 41.9%	65,150; 15.1%	37,000; 8.6%	—N/a	—N/a	—N/a	2,358; 0.5%
2011	139,999; 30.9%	188,891; 41.7%	104,307; 23.0%	18,577; 4.1%	—N/a	—N/a	—N/a	1,706; 0.4%
2015	281,664; 53.0%	157,510; 29.6%	74,451; 14.0%	14,412; 2.7%	—N/a	—N/a	—N/a	3,818; 0.7%
2019	265,033; 47.5%	156,751; 28.1%	91,863; 16.5%	34,190; 6.1%	6,766; 1.2%	—N/a	—N/a	2,886; 0.5%
2021	236,627; 45.1%	158,844; 30.3%	99,687; 19.0%	12,561; 2.4%	14,738; 2.8%	—N/a	—N/a	1,869; 0.4%
2025	371,711; 62.5%	175,209; 29.4%	36,303; 6.1%	6,227; 1.0%	1,451; 0.2%	—N/a	—N/a	4,137; 0.7%

Liberal Conservative New Democratic Green People's	Progressive Conservative (defunct) Alliance (defunct) Reform (defunct)

== Representation history by area ==
Representation	West Carleton	Kanata	Goulbourn	Rideau	Osgoode	South Nepean	North Nepean	West Ottawa	Westboro	Central Ottawa	South Ottawa	Alta Vista	Riverview	East Ottawa/Vanier	Rockcliffe	North Gloucester	South Gloucester	Orleans	Rural Cumberland
2022	Carleton	Kanata	Carleton			Nepean	Ottawa West—Nepean		Ottawa Centre		Ottawa South			Ottawa—Vanier			Carleton	Orléans	Prescott—Russell—Cumberland
2012	Kanata—Carleton		Carleton			Nepean	Ottawa West—Nepean		Ottawa Centre		Ottawa South			Ottawa—Vanier			Carleton	Orléans	Glengarry—Prescott—Russell
2003	Carleton—Mississippi Mills			Nepean—Carleton			Ottawa West—Nepean		Ottawa Centre		Ottawa South			Ottawa—Vanier			Nepean—Carleton	Ottawa—Orléans	Glengarry—Prescott—Russell
1996	Lanark—Carleton		Nepean—Carleton				Ottawa West—Nepean		Ottawa Centre		Ottawa South			Ottawa—Vanier			Ottawa—Orléans		Glengarry—Prescott—Russell
1987	Lanark—Carleton			Carleton—Gloucester		Nepean		Ottawa West		Ottawa Centre	Ottawa South			Ottawa—Vanier		Carleton—Gloucester			Glengarry—Prescott—Russell
1976	Lanark—Renfrew—Carleton		Nepean—Carleton					Ottawa West			Ottawa Centre	Ottawa—Carleton	Ottawa—Vanier		Ottawa—Carleton				Glengarry—Prescott—Russell

== 2025 ==
Electoral district	Candidates						Incumbent
Electoral district	Liberal	Conservative	NDP	Green	PPC	Other	Incumbent
Carleton; Details	Bruce Fanjoy; 43,846; 50.9%	Pierre Poilievre; 39,333; 45.7%	Beth Prokaska; 1,221; 1.4%	Mark Watson; 561; 0.7%		Karen Bourdeau (UP); 112 0.1%	Pierre Poilievre
Carleton; Details	Bruce Fanjoy; 43,846; 50.9%	Pierre Poilievre; 39,333; 45.7%	Beth Prokaska; 1,221; 1.4%	Mark Watson; 561; 0.7%		Sébastien CoRhino (Rhino.); 31 0.0%	Pierre Poilievre
Carleton; Details	Bruce Fanjoy; 43,846; 50.9%	Pierre Poilievre; 39,333; 45.7%	Beth Prokaska; 1,221; 1.4%	Mark Watson; 561; 0.7%		Danny Légaré (Mar.); 37 0.0%	Pierre Poilievre
Carleton; Details	Bruce Fanjoy; 43,846; 50.9%	Pierre Poilievre; 39,333; 45.7%	Beth Prokaska; 1,221; 1.4%	Mark Watson; 561; 0.7%		Shawn MacEachern (CFP); 63 0.1%	Pierre Poilievre
Carleton; Details	Bruce Fanjoy; 43,846; 50.9%	Pierre Poilievre; 39,333; 45.7%	Beth Prokaska; 1,221; 1.4%	Mark Watson; 561; 0.7%		LBC at bottom of table	Pierre Poilievre
Kanata	Jenna Sudds; 45,244; 60.8%	Greg Kung; 26,557; 35.7%	Melissa Simon; 1,702; 2.3%	Jennifer Purdy; 835; 1.1%		Moinuddin Siddiqui (Cent.); 122; 0.2%	Jenna Sudds; Kanata—Carleton
Nepean	Mark Carney; 46,073; 63.8%	Barbara Bal; 24,017; 33.2%	Shyam Shukla; 1,424; 2.0%	Greg Hopkins; 462; 0.6%	Eric Fleury; 261; 0.4%		Chandra Arya^{±}
Orléans	Marie-France Lalonde; 53,146; 67.4%	Steve Mansour; 22,072; 28.0%	Oulai B. Goué; 2,063; 2.6%	Jaycob Jacques; 652; 0.8%	Tafiqul Abu Mohammad; 331; 0.4%	Arlo Arrowsmith (Libert.); 301 0.4%	Marie-France Lalonde
Orléans	Marie-France Lalonde; 53,146; 67.4%	Steve Mansour; 22,072; 28.0%	Oulai B. Goué; 2,063; 2.6%	Jaycob Jacques; 652; 0.8%	Tafiqul Abu Mohammad; 331; 0.4%	Mazhar Choudhry (Ind.); 162 0.2%	Marie-France Lalonde
Orléans	Marie-France Lalonde; 53,146; 67.4%	Steve Mansour; 22,072; 28.0%	Oulai B. Goué; 2,063; 2.6%	Jaycob Jacques; 652; 0.8%	Tafiqul Abu Mohammad; 331; 0.4%	Arabella Vida (Ind.); 76 0.1%	Marie-France Lalonde
Ottawa Centre	Yasir Naqvi; 51,026; 62.7%	Paul D'Orsonnens; 12,692; 15.6%	Joel Harden; 15,935; 19.6%	Amanda Rosenstock; 916; 1.1%		Andrea Chabot (CFP); 268 0.3%	Yasir Naqvi
Ottawa Centre	Yasir Naqvi; 51,026; 62.7%	Paul D'Orsonnens; 12,692; 15.6%	Joel Harden; 15,935; 19.6%	Amanda Rosenstock; 916; 1.1%		Zed Chebib (Ind.); 47 0.1%	Yasir Naqvi
Ottawa Centre	Yasir Naqvi; 51,026; 62.7%	Paul D'Orsonnens; 12,692; 15.6%	Joel Harden; 15,935; 19.6%	Amanda Rosenstock; 916; 1.1%		Marie-Chantal Leriche (CHP); 234 0.3%	Yasir Naqvi
Ottawa Centre	Yasir Naqvi; 51,026; 62.7%	Paul D'Orsonnens; 12,692; 15.6%	Joel Harden; 15,935; 19.6%	Amanda Rosenstock; 916; 1.1%		Cashton Perry (Comm.); 154 0.2%	Yasir Naqvi
Ottawa Centre	Yasir Naqvi; 51,026; 62.7%	Paul D'Orsonnens; 12,692; 15.6%	Joel Harden; 15,935; 19.6%	Amanda Rosenstock; 916; 1.1%		Mike Salmon (Ind.); 66 0.1%	Yasir Naqvi
Ottawa South	David McGuinty; 43,388; 65.2%	Blair Turner; 18,010; 27.1%	Hena Masjedee; 4,017; 6.0%	Nira Dookeran; 642; 1.0%		William Cooper (Rhino.); 155 0.2%	David McGuinty
Ottawa South	David McGuinty; 43,388; 65.2%	Blair Turner; 18,010; 27.1%	Hena Masjedee; 4,017; 6.0%	Nira Dookeran; 642; 1.0%		Alex Perrier (CHP); 259 0.4%	David McGuinty
Ottawa South	David McGuinty; 43,388; 65.2%	Blair Turner; 18,010; 27.1%	Hena Masjedee; 4,017; 6.0%	Nira Dookeran; 642; 1.0%		John Redins (CFP); 93 0.1%	David McGuinty
Ottawa—Vanier—Gloucester	Mona Fortier; 45,934; 67.4%	Dean Wythe; 14,633; 21.5%	Tristan Oliff; 5,164; 7.6%	Christian Proulx; 1,345; 2.0%	Marty Simms; 349; 0.5%	Elizabeth Benoit (Ind.); 238 0.3%	Mona Fortier; Ottawa—Vanier
Ottawa—Vanier—Gloucester	Mona Fortier; 45,934; 67.4%	Dean Wythe; 14,633; 21.5%	Tristan Oliff; 5,164; 7.6%	Christian Proulx; 1,345; 2.0%	Marty Simms; 349; 0.5%	Coreen Corcoran (Libert.); 338 0.5%	Mona Fortier; Ottawa—Vanier
Ottawa—Vanier—Gloucester	Mona Fortier; 45,934; 67.4%	Dean Wythe; 14,633; 21.5%	Tristan Oliff; 5,164; 7.6%	Christian Proulx; 1,345; 2.0%	Marty Simms; 349; 0.5%	Christian Legeais (M-L); 182 0.3%	Mona Fortier; Ottawa—Vanier
Ottawa West—Nepean	Anita Vandenbeld; 43,555; 63.6%	Ryan Telford; 18,517; 27.1%	Josh Bizjak; 4,847; 7.1%	Prashanta Dhakal; 780; 1.1%	Glen Armstrong; 514; 0.8%	Sean Mulligan (CHP); 232; 0.3%	Anita Vandenbeld

Longest Ballot Committee (Note: Longest Ballot Committee candidates have Tomas Szuchewycz as their official agent. Affiliated candidates from registered political parties are listed normally.) All Independent unless noted: Sana Ahmad 41; Mélodie Anderson 16; Marthalee Aykroyd 9; Alex Banks 16; Tetia Bayoro 5; Sophie Bearden 14; Michael Bednarski 15; Line Bélanger 6; Jeani Boudreault (NA) 12; Alain Bourgault 8; John Boylan 17; Sarah Burke 27; Dante Camarena Jimenez 4; Jenny Cartwright 11; Jaël Champagne Gareau 4; David Cherniak 5; Charlie Currie 20; John Dale 20; Manon Marie Lili Desbiens (NA) 3; Gerrit Dogger 4; Ysack Dupont (NA) 0; Alexandra Engering 12; Scott Falkingham 45; Euan Fraser Tait 18; Maria Gabriel 10; Daniel Gagnon 8; Pierre Gauthier 38; Gregory Gillis 4; Jeffrey Goodman 11; Peter Gorman 7; Daniel Graham 2; Artem Gudkov 3; Zornitsa Halacheva 2; Anthony Hamel 2; Blake Hamilton 6; Robert Harris 8; Loren Hicks 6; Kerri Hildebrandt (NA) 3; Andrea Hollinger 8; Trevor Holsworth 3; Seyed Hosseini Lavasani 13; Ryan Huard 9; Demetrios Karavas 2; Laina Kohler (NA) 10; Kevin Krisa 5; Krzysztof Krzywinski (NA) 3; Dan Kyung 35; Samuel Lafontaine 3; Alain Lamontagne 5; Alexander Lein (NA) 6; Charles Lemieux 10; Connie Lukawski 8; Agnieszka Marszalek 6; Joseph Maw 1; Donald McKay 11; Mark Moutter 23; Christopher Navarro-Canseco (NA) 4; Winston Neutel 5; David Nguyen 15; Sheri Oberman 2; John Francis O'Flynn 8; Lény Painchaud 5; Lanna Palsson 4; Guillaume Paradis 37; Lajos Polya 12; Lorant Polya 57; Spencer Rocchi 4; Wallace Richard Rowat 2; Julian Selody 7; Hakim Sheriff 6; Roger Sherwood 3; Yogo Shimada 3; Michael Skirzynski 3; Julie St-Amand 3; Pascal St-Amand 2; Patrick Strzalkowski 4; Daniel Stuckless 11; Benjamin Teichman 2; Sarah Thompson 9; Darcy Vanderwater (NA) 12; Elliot Wand 5; Michal Wieczorek 7; David Zhu 21

== 2021 ==
Electoral district	Candidates						Incumbent
Electoral district	Liberal	Conservative	NDP	Green	PPC	Other	Incumbent
Carleton	Gustave Roy; 24,298; 34.28%	Pierre Poilievre; 35,356; 49.89%	Kevin Hua; 8,164; 11.52%	Nira Dookeran; 1,327; 1.87%	Peter Crawley; 1,728; 2.44%		Pierre Poilievre
Kanata—Carleton	Jenna Sudds; 26,394; 41.79%	Jennifer McAndrew; 24,373; 38.59%	Melissa Coenraad; 8,822; 13.97%	Jennifer Purdy; 1,709; 2.71%	Scott Miller; 1,858; 2.94%		Karen McCrimmon$
Nepean	Chandra Arya; 29,620; 45.05%	Matt Triemstra; 22,184; 33.74%	Sean Devine; 10,786; 16.41%	Gordon Kubanek; 1,318; 2.00%	Jay Nera; 1,840; 2.80%		Chandra Arya
Orléans	Marie-France Lalonde; 39,101; 51.94%	Mary-Elsie Wolfe; 21,700; 28.82%	Jessica Joanis; 10,983; 14.59%	Michael Hartnett; 1,233; 1.64%	Spencer Oklobdzija; 2,046; 2.72%	André Junior Cléroux (FPC); 220; 0.29%	Marie-France Lalonde
Ottawa Centre	Yasir Naqvi; 33,825; 45.50%	Carol Clemenhagen; 11,650; 15.67%	Angella MacEwen; 24,552; 33.03%	Angela Keller-Herzog; 2,115; 2.84%	Regina Watteel; 1,605; 2.16%	Shelby Bertrand (Animal); 261 0.35%	Catherine McKenna
Ottawa Centre	Yasir Naqvi; 33,825; 45.50%	Carol Clemenhagen; 11,650; 15.67%	Angella MacEwen; 24,552; 33.03%	Angela Keller-Herzog; 2,115; 2.84%	Regina Watteel; 1,605; 2.16%	Richard "Rich" Joyal (Ind.); 132 0.18%	Catherine McKenna
Ottawa Centre	Yasir Naqvi; 33,825; 45.50%	Carol Clemenhagen; 11,650; 15.67%	Angella MacEwen; 24,552; 33.03%	Angela Keller-Herzog; 2,115; 2.84%	Regina Watteel; 1,605; 2.16%	Alex McDonald (Comm.); 201 0.27%	Catherine McKenna
Ottawa South	David McGuinty; 29,038; 48.81%	Eli Tannis; 15,497; 26.05%	Huda Mukbil; 11,514; 19.35%	Les Schram; 1,401; 2.35%	Chylow Hall; 1,898; 3.19%	Larry Wasslen (Comm.); 144; 0.24%	David McGuinty
Ottawa—Vanier	Mona Fortier; 28,462; 49.05%	Heidi Jensen; 11,611; 20.01%	Lyse-Pascale Inamuco; 13,703; 23.61%	Christian Proulx; 1,816; 3.13%	Jean-Jacques Desgranges; 1,855; 3.20%	Crystelle Bourguignon (FPC); 179 0.31%	Mona Fortier
Ottawa—Vanier	Mona Fortier; 28,462; 49.05%	Heidi Jensen; 11,611; 20.01%	Lyse-Pascale Inamuco; 13,703; 23.61%	Christian Proulx; 1,816; 3.13%	Jean-Jacques Desgranges; 1,855; 3.20%	Daniel Elford (Libert.); 248 0.43%	Mona Fortier
Ottawa—Vanier	Mona Fortier; 28,462; 49.05%	Heidi Jensen; 11,611; 20.01%	Lyse-Pascale Inamuco; 13,703; 23.61%	Christian Proulx; 1,816; 3.13%	Jean-Jacques Desgranges; 1,855; 3.20%	Marie-Chantal TaiEl Leriche (Ind.); 157 0.27%	Mona Fortier
Ottawa West—Nepean	Anita Vandenbeld; 25,889; 45.10%	Jennifer Jennekens; 16,473; 28.70%	Yavar Hameed; 11,163; 19.45%	David Stibbe; 1,642; 2.86%	David Yeo; 1,908; 3.32%	Sean Mulligan (CHP); 327; 0.57%	Anita Vandenbeld

== 2019 ==
Electoral district	Candidates							Incumbent
Electoral district	Liberal	Conservative	NDP	Green	PPC	Communist	Other	Incumbent
Carleton	Chris Rodgers; 26,518; 38.23%	Pierre Poilievre; 32,147; 46.35%	Kevin Hua; 6,479; 9.34%	Gordon Kubanek; 3,423; 4.94%	Alain Musende; 792; 1.14%			Pierre Poilievre
Kanata—Carleton	Karen McCrimmon; 28,746; 43.05%	Justina McCaffrey; 24,361; 36.48%	Melissa Coenraad; 8,317; 12.46%	Jennifer Purdy; 4,387; 6.57%	Scott Miller; 961; 1.44%			Karen McCrimmon
Nepean	Chandra Arya; 31,933; 45.89%	Brian St. Louis; 23,320; 33.51%	Zaff Ansari; 9,104; 13.08%	Jean-Luc Cooke; 4,379; 6.29%	Azim Hooda; 687; 0.99%	Dustan Wang; 160; 0.23%		Chandra Arya
Orléans	Marie-France Lalonde; 44,183; 54.27%	David Bertschi; 22,984; 28.23%	Jacqui Wiens; 9,428; 11.58%	Michelle Petersen; 3,829; 4.70%	Roger Saint-Fleur; 986; 1.21%			Andrew Leslie†
Ottawa Centre	Catherine McKenna; 38,391; 48.66%	Carol Clemenhagen; 9,920; 12.57%	Emilie Taman; 22,916; 29.04%	Angela Keller-Herzog; 5,837; 7.40%	Merylee Sevilla; 720; 0.91%	Stuart Ryan; 111; 0.14%	Shelby Bertrand (Animal); 207 0.26%	Catherine McKenna
Ottawa Centre	Catherine McKenna; 38,391; 48.66%	Carol Clemenhagen; 9,920; 12.57%	Emilie Taman; 22,916; 29.04%	Angela Keller-Herzog; 5,837; 7.40%	Merylee Sevilla; 720; 0.91%	Stuart Ryan; 111; 0.14%	Coreen Corcoran (Libert.); 360 0.46%	Catherine McKenna
Ottawa Centre	Catherine McKenna; 38,391; 48.66%	Carol Clemenhagen; 9,920; 12.57%	Emilie Taman; 22,916; 29.04%	Angela Keller-Herzog; 5,837; 7.40%	Merylee Sevilla; 720; 0.91%	Stuart Ryan; 111; 0.14%	Chris G Jones (Ind.); 177 0.22%	Catherine McKenna
Ottawa Centre	Catherine McKenna; 38,391; 48.66%	Carol Clemenhagen; 9,920; 12.57%	Emilie Taman; 22,916; 29.04%	Angela Keller-Herzog; 5,837; 7.40%	Merylee Sevilla; 720; 0.91%	Stuart Ryan; 111; 0.14%	Marie-Chantal Leriche (CHP); 198 0.25%	Catherine McKenna
Ottawa Centre	Catherine McKenna; 38,391; 48.66%	Carol Clemenhagen; 9,920; 12.57%	Emilie Taman; 22,916; 29.04%	Angela Keller-Herzog; 5,837; 7.40%	Merylee Sevilla; 720; 0.91%	Stuart Ryan; 111; 0.14%	Giang Ha Thu Vo (Ind.); 65 0.08%	Catherine McKenna
Ottawa South	David McGuinty; 34,205; 52.32%	Eli Tannis; 16,025; 24.51%	Morgan Gay; 10,457; 16.00%	Les Schram; 3,645; 5.58%	Rodrigo André Bolaños; 717; 1.10%	Larry Wasslen; 99; 0.15%	Ahmed Bouragba (Ind.); 141 0.22%	David McGuinty
Ottawa South	David McGuinty; 34,205; 52.32%	Eli Tannis; 16,025; 24.51%	Morgan Gay; 10,457; 16.00%	Les Schram; 3,645; 5.58%	Rodrigo André Bolaños; 717; 1.10%	Larry Wasslen; 99; 0.15%	Sarmad Laith (Ind.); 87 0.13%	David McGuinty
Ottawa—Vanier	Mona Fortier; 32,679; 51.16%	Joel E. Bernard; 11,118; 17.40%	Stéphanie Mercier; 13,516; 21.16%	Oriana Ngabirano; 4,796; 7.51%	Paul Durst; 1,064; 1.67%	Michelle Paquette; 115; 0.18%	Joel Altman (Ind.); 211 0.33%	Mona Fortier
Ottawa—Vanier	Mona Fortier; 32,679; 51.16%	Joel E. Bernard; 11,118; 17.40%	Stéphanie Mercier; 13,516; 21.16%	Oriana Ngabirano; 4,796; 7.51%	Paul Durst; 1,064; 1.67%	Michelle Paquette; 115; 0.18%	Christian Legeais (M-L); 59 0.09%	Mona Fortier
Ottawa—Vanier	Mona Fortier; 32,679; 51.16%	Joel E. Bernard; 11,118; 17.40%	Stéphanie Mercier; 13,516; 21.16%	Oriana Ngabirano; 4,796; 7.51%	Paul Durst; 1,064; 1.67%	Michelle Paquette; 115; 0.18%	Daniel James McHugh (Ind.); 94 0.15%	Mona Fortier
Ottawa—Vanier	Mona Fortier; 32,679; 51.16%	Joel E. Bernard; 11,118; 17.40%	Stéphanie Mercier; 13,516; 21.16%	Oriana Ngabirano; 4,796; 7.51%	Paul Durst; 1,064; 1.67%	Michelle Paquette; 115; 0.18%	Derek Miller (Rhino.); 229 0.36%	Mona Fortier
Ottawa West—Nepean	Anita Vandenbeld; 28,378; 45.62%	Abdul Abdi; 16,876; 27.13%	Angella MacEwen; 11,646; 18.72%	David Stibbe; 3,894; 6.26%	Serguei Guevorkian; 839; 1.35%	Vincent Cama; 103; 0.17%	Nick Lin (M-L); 48 0.08%	Anita Vandenbeld
Ottawa West—Nepean	Anita Vandenbeld; 28,378; 45.62%	Abdul Abdi; 16,876; 27.13%	Angella MacEwen; 11,646; 18.72%	David Stibbe; 3,894; 6.26%	Serguei Guevorkian; 839; 1.35%	Vincent Cama; 103; 0.17%	Butch Moore (NA); 71 0.11%	Anita Vandenbeld
Ottawa West—Nepean	Anita Vandenbeld; 28,378; 45.62%	Abdul Abdi; 16,876; 27.13%	Angella MacEwen; 11,646; 18.72%	David Stibbe; 3,894; 6.26%	Serguei Guevorkian; 839; 1.35%	Vincent Cama; 103; 0.17%	Sean Mulligan (CHP); 351 0.56%	Anita Vandenbeld

== 2015 ==
Electoral district	Candidates					Incumbent
Electoral district	Conservative	NDP	Liberal	Green	Other	Incumbent
Carleton	Pierre Poilievre; 27,762; 46.86%	Kc Larocque; 3,632; 6.13%	Chris Rodgers; 25,913; 43.74%	Deborah Coyne; 1,932; 3.26%		New District
Kanata—Carleton	Walter Pamic; 24,829; 39.21%	John Hansen; 4,313; 6.81%	Karen McCrimmon; 32,477; 51.29%	Andrew West; 1,704; 2.69%		Gordon O'Connor†; Carleton—Mississippi Mills
Nepean	Andy Wang; 23,442; 36.13%	Sean Devine; 5,324; 8.20%	Chandra Arya; 34,017; 52.42%	Jean-Luc Roger Cooke; 1,513; 2.33%	Jesus Cosico (Ind.); 416 0.64%	Pierre Poilievre‡ Nepean—Carleton
Nepean	Andy Wang; 23,442; 36.13%	Sean Devine; 5,324; 8.20%	Chandra Arya; 34,017; 52.42%	Jean-Luc Roger Cooke; 1,513; 2.33%	Hubert Mamba (Ind.); 69 0.11%	Pierre Poilievre‡ Nepean—Carleton
Nepean	Andy Wang; 23,442; 36.13%	Sean Devine; 5,324; 8.20%	Chandra Arya; 34,017; 52.42%	Jean-Luc Roger Cooke; 1,513; 2.33%	Tony Seed (M-L); 41 0.06%	Pierre Poilievre‡ Nepean—Carleton
Nepean	Andy Wang; 23,442; 36.13%	Sean Devine; 5,324; 8.20%	Chandra Arya; 34,017; 52.42%	Jean-Luc Roger Cooke; 1,513; 2.33%	Harry Splett (Ind.); 66 0.10%	Pierre Poilievre‡ Nepean—Carleton
Orléans	Royal Galipeau; 23,821; 30.54%	Nancy Tremblay; 6,215; 7.97%	Andrew Leslie; 46,542; 59.68%	Raphaël Morin; 1,410; 1.81%		Royal Galipeau; Ottawa—Orléans
Ottawa Centre	Damian Konstantinakos; 10,943; 14.49%	Paul Dewar; 29,098; 38.54%	Catherine McKenna; 32,211; 42.66%	Tom Milroy; 2,246; 2.97%	John Andrew Omowole Akpata (Mar.); 160 0.21%	Paul Dewar
Ottawa Centre	Damian Konstantinakos; 10,943; 14.49%	Paul Dewar; 29,098; 38.54%	Catherine McKenna; 32,211; 42.66%	Tom Milroy; 2,246; 2.97%	Dean T. Harris (Libert.); 551 0.73%	Paul Dewar
Ottawa Centre	Damian Konstantinakos; 10,943; 14.49%	Paul Dewar; 29,098; 38.54%	Catherine McKenna; 32,211; 42.66%	Tom Milroy; 2,246; 2.97%	Conrad Lukawski (Rhino.); 167 0.22%	Paul Dewar
Ottawa Centre	Damian Konstantinakos; 10,943; 14.49%	Paul Dewar; 29,098; 38.54%	Catherine McKenna; 32,211; 42.66%	Tom Milroy; 2,246; 2.97%	Stuart Ryan (Comm.); 124 0.16%	Paul Dewar
Ottawa South	Dev Balkissoon; 15,711; 24.30%	George Brown; 7,480; 11.57%	David McGuinty; 38,831; 60.06%	John Redins; 1,888; 2.92%	Al Gullon (PC); 366 0.57%	David McGuinty
Ottawa South	Dev Balkissoon; 15,711; 24.30%	George Brown; 7,480; 11.57%	David McGuinty; 38,831; 60.06%	John Redins; 1,888; 2.92%	Larry Wasslen (Comm.); 136 0.21%	David McGuinty
Ottawa South	Dev Balkissoon; 15,711; 24.30%	George Brown; 7,480; 11.57%	David McGuinty; 38,831; 60.06%	John Redins; 1,888; 2.92%	Damien Wilson (Libert.); 237 0.37%	David McGuinty
Ottawa—Vanier	David Piccini; 12,109; 19.11%	Emilie Taman; 12,194; 19.25%	Mauril Bélanger; 36,474; 57.57%	Nira Dookeran; 1,947; 3.07%	Coreen Corcoran (Libert.); 503 0.79%	Mauril Bélanger
Ottawa—Vanier	David Piccini; 12,109; 19.11%	Emilie Taman; 12,194; 19.25%	Mauril Bélanger; 36,474; 57.57%	Nira Dookeran; 1,947; 3.07%	Christian Legeais (M-L); 128 0.20%	Mauril Bélanger
Ottawa West—Nepean	Abdul Abdi; 18,893; 30.03%	Marlene Rivier; 6,195; 9.85%	Anita Vandenbeld; 35,199; 55.95%	Mark Brooks; 1,772; 2.82%	Sam Heaton (M-L); 114 0.18%	Vacant
Ottawa West—Nepean	Abdul Abdi; 18,893; 30.03%	Marlene Rivier; 6,195; 9.85%	Anita Vandenbeld; 35,199; 55.95%	Mark Brooks; 1,772; 2.82%	Rod Taylor (CHP); 740 1.18%	Vacant

== 2011 ==
Electoral district	Candidates					Incumbent
Electoral district	Conservative	Liberal	NDP	Green	Other	Incumbent
Carleton—Mississippi Mills	Gordon O'Connor; 43,723; 56.95%	Karen McCrimmon; 18,393; 23.96%	Erin Peters; 11,223; 14.62%	John Hogg; 3,434; 4.47%		Gordon O'Connor
Nepean—Carleton	Pierre Poilievre; 43,477; 54.45%	Ryan Keon; 20,146; 25.23%	Ric Dagenais; 12,962; 16.23%	Jean-Luc Cooke; 3,260; 4.08%		Pierre Poilievre
Ottawa Centre	Damian Konstantinakos; 14,063; 21.68%	Scott Bradley; 13,049; 20.12%	Paul Dewar; 33,805; 52.11%	Jen Hunter; 3,262; 5.03%	John Andrew Akpata (Mar.); 326 0.50%	Paul Dewar
Ottawa Centre	Damian Konstantinakos; 14,063; 21.68%	Scott Bradley; 13,049; 20.12%	Paul Dewar; 33,805; 52.11%	Jen Hunter; 3,262; 5.03%	Romeo Bellai (Ind.); 210 0.32%	Paul Dewar
Ottawa Centre	Damian Konstantinakos; 14,063; 21.68%	Scott Bradley; 13,049; 20.12%	Paul Dewar; 33,805; 52.11%	Jen Hunter; 3,262; 5.03%	Stuart Ryan (Comm.); 109 0.17%	Paul Dewar
Ottawa Centre	Damian Konstantinakos; 14,063; 21.68%	Scott Bradley; 13,049; 20.12%	Paul Dewar; 33,805; 52.11%	Jen Hunter; 3,262; 5.03%	Pierre Soublière (M-L); 44 0.07%	Paul Dewar
Ottawa—Orléans	Royal Galipeau; 28,584; 44.55%	David Bertschi; 24,649; 38.42%	Martine Cénatus; 9,086; 14.16%	Paul Maillet; 1,839; 2.87%		Royal Galipeau
Ottawa South	Elie Salibi; 19,634; 33.28%	David McGuinty; 25,963; 44.01%	James McLaren; 10,712; 18.16%	Mick Kitor; 1,787; 3.03%	Mike Bleskie (Pirate); 382 0.65%	David McGuinty
Ottawa South	Elie Salibi; 19,634; 33.28%	David McGuinty; 25,963; 44.01%	James McLaren; 10,712; 18.16%	Mick Kitor; 1,787; 3.03%	Al Gullon (PC); 513 0.87%	David McGuinty
Ottawa—Vanier	Rem Westland; 14,184; 27.06%	Mauril Bélanger; 20,009; 38.17%	Trevor Haché; 15,391; 29.36%	Caroline Rioux; 2,716; 5.18%	Christian Legeais (M-L); 122; 0.23%	Mauril Bélanger
Ottawa West—Nepean	John Baird; 25,226; 44.71%	Anita Vandenbeld; 17,790; 31.53%	Marlene Rivier; 11,128; 19.72%	Mark MacKenzie; 2,279; 4.04%		John Baird

== 2008 ==
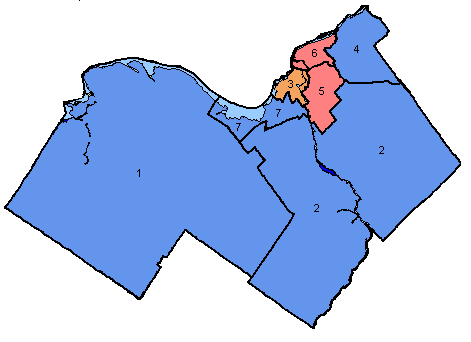
Map of the region's ridings. Colours show the result after the 2006 and 2008 elections which had the same seat results

1. Carleton-Mississippi Mills
2. Nepean-Carleton
3. Ottawa Centre
4. Ottawa-Orléans
5. Ottawa South
6. Ottawa-Vanier
7. Ottawa West-Nepean

Key

- Red - Liberal seats
- Blue - Conservative seats
- Orange - NDP seats

Electoral district	Candidates					Incumbent
Electoral district	Conservative	Liberal	NDP	Green	Other	Incumbent
Carleton—Mississippi Mills	Gordon O'Connor; 39,433; 57.77%	Justin MacKinnon; 15,254; 22.35%	Paul Arbour; 6,583; 9.64%	Jake Cole; 6,983; 10.23%		Gordon O'Connor
Nepean—Carleton	Pierre Poilievre; 39,921; 55.84%	Ed Mahfouz; 16,743; 23.42%	Phil Brown; 6,946; 9.72%	Lori Gadzala; 7,880; 11.02%		Pierre Poilievre
Ottawa Centre	Brian McGarry; 15,065; 23.57%	Penny Collenette; 16,633; 26.02%	Paul Dewar; 25,399; 39.74%	Jen Hunter; 6,348; 9.93%	John Andrew Akpata (Mar.); 378 0.59%	Paul Dewar
Ottawa Centre	Brian McGarry; 15,065; 23.57%	Penny Collenette; 16,633; 26.02%	Paul Dewar; 25,399; 39.74%	Jen Hunter; 6,348; 9.93%	Pierre Soublière (M-L); 95 0.15%	Paul Dewar
Ottawa—Orléans	Royal Galipeau; 27,244; 44.91%	Marc Godbout; 23,549; 38.82%	Amy O'Dell; 6,025; 9.93%	Paul Maillet; 3,845; 6.34%		Royal Galipeau
Ottawa South	Elie Salibi; 19,417; 33.38%	David McGuinty; 29,035; 49.91%	Hijal De Sarkar; 4,920; 8.46%	Qais Ghanem; 3,939; 6.77%	Jean-Serge Brisson (Libert.); 244 0.42%	David McGuinty
Ottawa South	Elie Salibi; 19,417; 33.38%	David McGuinty; 29,035; 49.91%	Hijal De Sarkar; 4,920; 8.46%	Qais Ghanem; 3,939; 6.77%	Al Gullon (PC); 620 1.07%	David McGuinty
Ottawa—Vanier	Patrick Glémaud; 14,138; 27.28%	Mauril Bélanger; 23,948; 46.20%	Trevor Haché; 8,845; 17.06%	Akbar Manoussi; 4,447; 8.58%	Christian Legeais (M-L); 130 0.25%	Mauril Bélanger
Ottawa—Vanier	Patrick Glémaud; 14,138; 27.28%	Mauril Bélanger; 23,948; 46.20%	Trevor Haché; 8,845; 17.06%	Akbar Manoussi; 4,447; 8.58%	Michel St-Onge (CAP); 100 0.19%	Mauril Bélanger
Ottawa—Vanier	Patrick Glémaud; 14,138; 27.28%	Mauril Bélanger; 23,948; 46.20%	Trevor Haché; 8,845; 17.06%	Akbar Manoussi; 4,447; 8.58%	Robert Taylor-Larter (Ind.); 227 0.44%	Mauril Bélanger
Ottawa West—Nepean	John Baird; 25,109; 44.98%	David Pratt; 20,161; 36.12%	Marlene Rivier; 6,432; 11.52%	Francis Coates; 3,558; 6.37%	Alex McDonald (Comm.); 150 0.27%	John Baird
Ottawa West—Nepean	John Baird; 25,109; 44.98%	David Pratt; 20,161; 36.12%	Marlene Rivier; 6,432; 11.52%	Francis Coates; 3,558; 6.37%	David Page (Ind.); 414 0.74%	John Baird

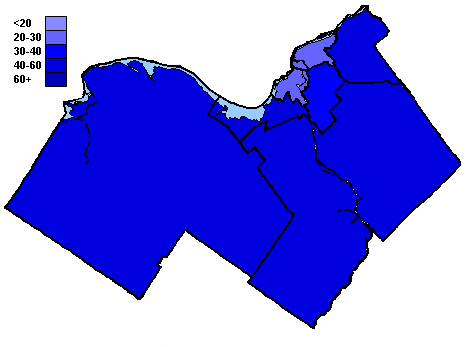
Conservative Party of Canada

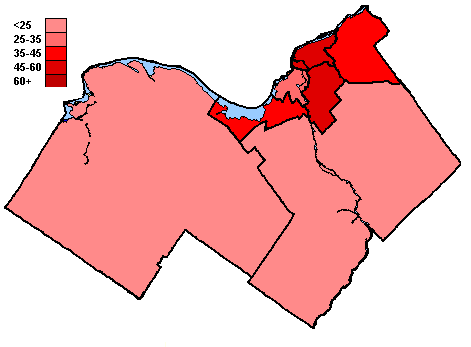
Liberal Party of Canada

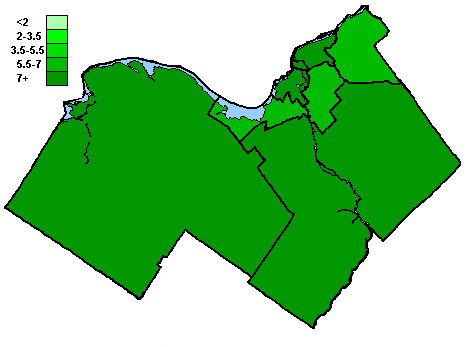
Green Party of Canada

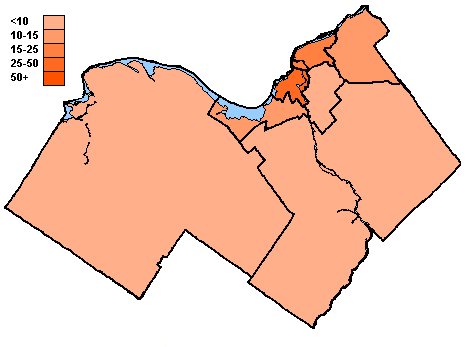
New Democratic Party

== 2006 ==
Electoral district	Candidates					Incumbent
Electoral district	Liberal	Conservative	NDP	Green	Other	Incumbent
Carleton—Mississippi Mills	Isabel Metcalfe; 16,360; 23.57%	Gordon O'Connor; 39,004; 56.19%	Tasha Bridgen; 8,677; 12.50%	Jake Cole; 4,544; 6.55%	George Kolaczynski (Mar.); 426 0.61%	Gordon O'Connor
Carleton—Mississippi Mills	Isabel Metcalfe; 16,360; 23.57%	Gordon O'Connor; 39,004; 56.19%	Tasha Bridgen; 8,677; 12.50%	Jake Cole; 4,544; 6.55%	Tracy Parsons (PC); 408 0.59%	Gordon O'Connor
Nepean—Carleton	Michael Gaffney; 20,111; 27.98%	Pierre Poilievre; 39,512; 54.97%	Laurel Gibbons; 8,274; 11.51%	Lori Gadzala; 3,976; 5.53%		Pierre Poilievre
Ottawa Centre	Richard Mahoney; 19,468; 29.22%	Keith Fountain; 15,105; 22.67%	Paul Dewar; 24,609; 36.94%	David Chernushenko; 6,765; 10.15%	John Andrew Akpata (Mar.); 387 0.58%	Ed Broadbent†
Ottawa Centre	Richard Mahoney; 19,468; 29.22%	Keith Fountain; 15,105; 22.67%	Paul Dewar; 24,609; 36.94%	David Chernushenko; 6,765; 10.15%	Christian Legeais (M-L); 69 0.10%	Ed Broadbent†
Ottawa Centre	Richard Mahoney; 19,468; 29.22%	Keith Fountain; 15,105; 22.67%	Paul Dewar; 24,609; 36.94%	David Chernushenko; 6,765; 10.15%	Stuart Ryan (Comm.); 102 0.15%	Ed Broadbent†
Ottawa Centre	Richard Mahoney; 19,468; 29.22%	Keith Fountain; 15,105; 22.67%	Paul Dewar; 24,609; 36.94%	David Chernushenko; 6,765; 10.15%	Anwar Syed (Ind.); 121 0.18%	Ed Broadbent†
Ottawa—Orléans	Marc Godbout; 24,224; 39.08%	Royal Galipeau; 25,455; 41.06%	Mark Andrew Leahy; 9,354; 15.09%	Sarah Samplonius; 2,377; 3.83%	Alain Saint-Yves (Ind.); 578; 0.93%	Marc Godbout
Ottawa South	David McGuinty; 27,158; 44.15%	Allan Cutler; 23,028; 37.44%	Henri Sader; 8,138; 13.23%	John Ford; 2,913; 4.74%	Brad Thomson (PC); 273; 0.44%	David McGuinty
Ottawa—Vanier	Mauril Bélanger; 23,567; 42.31%	Paul Benoit; 15,970; 28.67%	Ric Dagenais; 12,145; 21.81%	Raphaël Thierrin; 3,675; 6.60%	Alexandre Legeais (M-L); 117 0.21%	Mauril Bélanger
Ottawa—Vanier	Mauril Bélanger; 23,567; 42.31%	Paul Benoit; 15,970; 28.67%	Ric Dagenais; 12,145; 21.81%	Raphaël Thierrin; 3,675; 6.60%	James C. Parsons (PC); 221 0.40%	Mauril Bélanger
Ottawa West—Nepean	Lee Farnworth; 20,250; 34.06%	John Baird; 25,607; 43.07%	Marlene Rivier; 9,626; 16.19%	Neil Adair; 2,941; 4.95%	Randy Bens (CAP); 121 0.20%	Marlene Catterall†
Ottawa West—Nepean	Lee Farnworth; 20,250; 34.06%	John Baird; 25,607; 43.07%	Marlene Rivier; 9,626; 16.19%	Neil Adair; 2,941; 4.95%	John Pacheco (Ind.); 905 1.52%	Marlene Catterall†

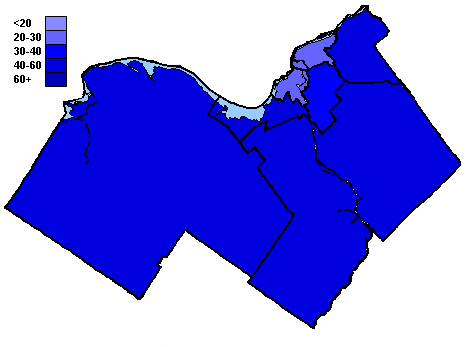
Conservative Party of Canada

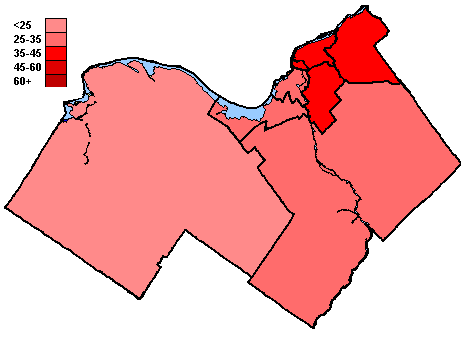
Liberal Party of Canada

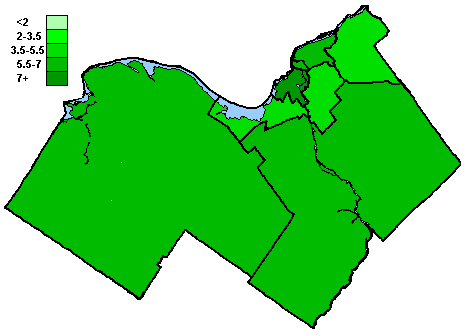
Green Party of Canada

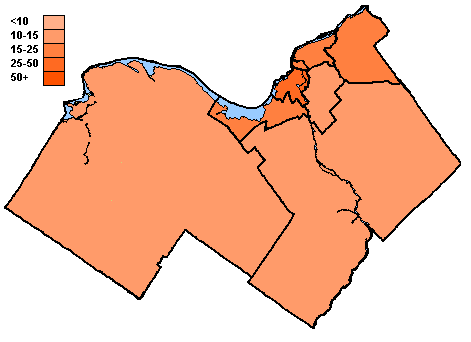
New Democratic Party

== 2004 ==
Electoral district	Candidates							Incumbent
Electoral district	Liberal	Conservative	NDP	Green	Marijuana	Marxist-Leninist	Other	Incumbent
Carleton—Lanark	Dan Wicklum; 22,185; 33.99%	Gordon O'Connor; 32,664; 50.04%	Rick Prashaw; 6,758; 10.35%	Stuart Langstaff; 3,665; 5.61%				New district
Nepean—Carleton	David Pratt; 26,684; 40.05%	Pierre Poilievre; 30,420; 45.66%	Phil Brown; 6,072; 9.11%	Chris Walker; 2,886; 4.33%	Brad Powers; 561; 0.84%			David Pratt
Ottawa Centre	Richard Mahoney; 19,478; 31.07%	Mike Murphy; 11,933; 19.04%	Ed Broadbent; 25,734; 41.05%	David Chernushenko; 4,730; 7.55%	Michael Foster; 455; 0.73%	Louis Lang; 67; 0.11%	Carla Marie Dancey (CAP); 76 0.12%	Vacant (Note: Previously held by Liberal Mac Harb)
Ottawa Centre	Richard Mahoney; 19,478; 31.07%	Mike Murphy; 11,933; 19.04%	Ed Broadbent; 25,734; 41.05%	David Chernushenko; 4,730; 7.55%	Michael Foster; 455; 0.73%	Louis Lang; 67; 0.11%	Robert G. Gauthier (Ind.); 121 0.19%	Vacant
Ottawa Centre	Richard Mahoney; 19,478; 31.07%	Mike Murphy; 11,933; 19.04%	Ed Broadbent; 25,734; 41.05%	David Chernushenko; 4,730; 7.55%	Michael Foster; 455; 0.73%	Louis Lang; 67; 0.11%	Stuart Ryan (Comm.); 90 0.14%	Vacant
Ottawa—Orléans	Marc Godbout; 26,383; 44.99%	Walter Robinson; 23,655; 40.34%	Crystal Leblanc; 5,905; 10.07%	Dan Biocchi; 2,699; 4.60%				Eugène Bellemare†
Ottawa South	David McGuinty; 25,956; 43.82%	Alan Riddell; 20,622; 34.82%	Monia Mazigh; 8,080; 13.64%	John Ford; 3,398; 5.74%	John Akpata; 495; 0.84%	Saroj Bains; 79; 0.13%	Raymond Aubin (Ind.); 225 0.38%	John Paul Manley†
Ottawa South	David McGuinty; 25,956; 43.82%	Alan Riddell; 20,622; 34.82%	Monia Mazigh; 8,080; 13.64%	John Ford; 3,398; 5.74%	John Akpata; 495; 0.84%	Saroj Bains; 79; 0.13%	Brad Thomson (PC); 375 0.63%	John Paul Manley†
Ottawa—Vanier	Mauril Bélanger; 25,952; 49.17%	Kevin Friday; 12,769; 24.19%	Ric Dagenais; 9,787; 18.54%	Raphaël Thierrin; 3,628; 6.87%	Carol Taylor; 558; 1.06%	Françoise Roy; 85; 0.16%		Mauril Bélanger
Ottawa West—Nepean	Marlene Catterall; 23,971; 41.78%	Sean Casey; 22,591; 39.37%	Marlene Rivier; 7,449; 12.98%	Neil Adair; 2,748; 4.79%	Russell Barth; 430; 0.75%	Alexandre Legeais; 68; 0.12%	Mary-Sue Haliburton (CAP); 121; 0.21%	Marlene Catterall

=== Maps ===
1. Carleton-Lanark
2. Nepean-Carleton
3. Ottawa Centre
4. Ottawa-Orléans
5. Ottawa South
6. Ottawa-Vanier
7. Ottawa West-Nepean
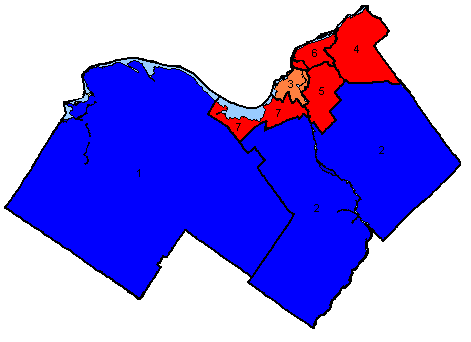
Map of the region's ridings. Colours show the result after the 2004 election

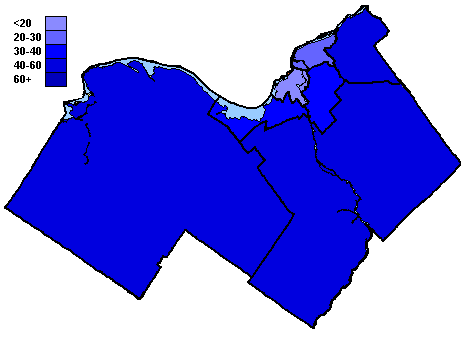
Conservative Party of Canada

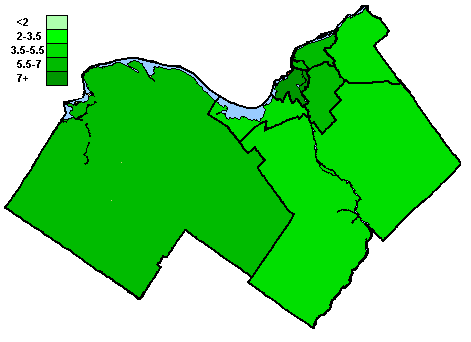
Green Party of Canada

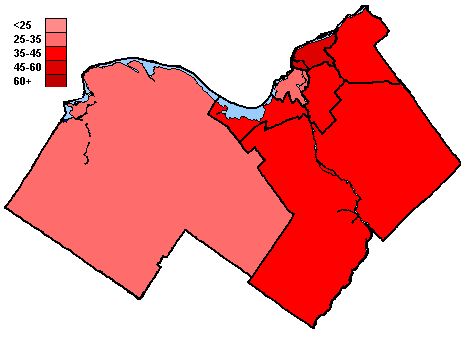
Liberal Party of Canada

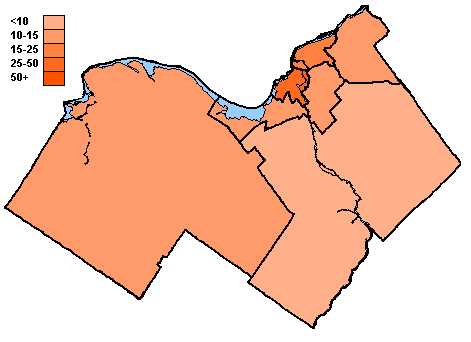
New Democratic Party

== 2000 ==
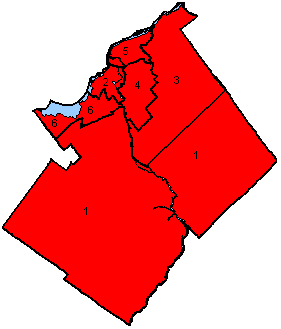
Map of the region's ridings in 2000. Colours show the result from the 2000 election

1. Nepean-Carleton
2. Ottawa Centre
3. Ottawa-Orléans
4. Ottawa South
5. Ottawa-Vanier
6. Ottawa West-Nepean

Electoral district	Candidates								Incumbent
Electoral district	Liberal	Canadian Alliance	NDP	PC	Green	Marijuana	Natural Law	Other	Incumbent
Nepean—Carleton	David Pratt; 24,570; 41.16%	Michael Green; 22,310; 37.37%	Craig Parsons; 2,223; 3.72%	Bill Knott; 9,536; 15.98%	Isobel McGregor; 805; 1.35%		Lester Newby; 118; 0.20%	Jacques Waisvisz (CAP); 131; 0.22%	David Pratt
Ottawa Centre	Mac Harb; 22,716; 40.01%	David Brown; 10,167; 17.91%	Heather-Jane Robertson; 13,516; 23.81%	Beverley Mitchell; 7,505; 13.22%	Chris Bradshaw; 1,531; 2.70%	Brad Powers; 813; 1.43%	Neil Paterson; 111; 0.20%	Mistahi Corkill (M-L); 66 0.12% Carla Marie Dancey (CAP); 210 0.37% Marvin Glass (Comm.); 139 0.24%	Mac Harb
Ottawa—Orléans	Eugène Bellemare; 26,635; 51.01%	Rita Burke; 13,316; 25.50%	Maureen Prebinski; 2,169; 4.15%	Marc-André Bélair; 8,738; 16.73%	Richard Warman; 561; 1.07%	John Albert; 534; 1.02%	Heather Hanson; 117; 0.22%	Louis Lang (M-L); 41 0.08% Jean Saintonge (CAP); 108 0.21%	Eugène Bellemare
Ottawa South	John Manley; 26,585; 51.33%	Brad Darbyson; 12,677; 24.48%	Jeannie Page; 3,463; 6.69%	Kevin Lister; 8,096; 15.63%		Ron Whalen; 679; 1.31%	James Hea; 141; 0.27%	Marsha Fine (M-L); 80 0.15% Mick Panesar (Comm.); 69 0.13%	John Manley
Ottawa—Vanier	Mauril Bélanger; 26,749; 55.56%	Nestor Gayowsky; 7,600; 15.79%	Joseph Zebrowski; 4,194; 8.71%	Stephen Woollcombe; 7,400; 15.37%	Adam Sommerfeld; 1,083; 2.25%	Raymond Turmel; 728; 1.51%	Pierrette Blondin; 187; 0.39%	Kim Roberge (M-L); 74 0.15% Raymond Samuéls (CAP); 126 0.26%	Mauril Bélanger
Ottawa West—Nepean	Marlene Catterall; 22,606; 43.32%	Barry Yeates; 14,753; 28.27%	Kevin Kinsella; 2,718; 5.21%	Tom Curran; 10,507; 20.13%	Matt Takach; 585; 1.12%	Sotos Petrides; 423; 0.81%	Richard Michael Wolfson; 58; 0.11%	David Creighton (CAP); 376 0.72% Stuart Ryan (Comm.); 70 0.13% John Turmel (Ind.); 89 0.17%	Marlene Catterall

== 1997 ==
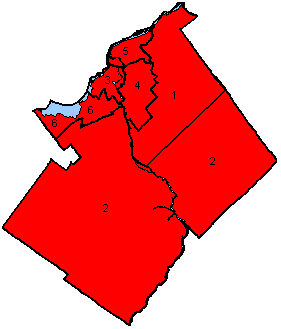
Map of the region's ridings in 1997. Colours show the result from the 1997 election

1. Carleton-Gloucester
2. Nepean-Carleton
3. Ottawa Centre
4. Ottawa South
5. Ottawa-Vanier
6. Ottawa West-Nepean

Electoral district	Candidates								Incumbent
Electoral district	Liberal	Reform	NDP	PC	Natural Law	Green	Canadian Action	Other	Incumbent
Carleton—Gloucester	Eugène Bellemare; 29,862	Shannon Smith; 7,404	Cindy Ignacz; 2,831	Michel Drapeau; 9,960	James Hea; 349		Jean Saintonge; 244		Eugène Bellemare
Nepean—Carleton	David Pratt; 28,366	Paul Fitzgerald; 15,333	Cathy Martin; 2,788	M.E. Betty Hill; 11,072	Brian Ernest Jackson; 238		Terrence Bell; 331		Beryl Gaffney†
Ottawa Centre	Mac Harb; 25,987	John Perocchio; 6,651	Jamey Heath; 13,646	Peter Annis; 9,391	Neil Paterson; 211	Frank de Jong; 855	Howard Bertram; 236	Susan Cumby (Ind.); 190; Hardial Bains (M-L); 150; Malek Khouri (Ind.); 92; Ray Joseph Cormier (Ind.); 91	Mac Harb
Ottawa South	John Manley; 31,725	Carla Marie Dancey; 8,522	Marcella Munro; 4,374	Keith Beardsley; 8,115	Richard Michael Wolfson; 167	Maria von Fickenstein; 440	Paula Williams; 281	Anna di Carlo (M-L); 140	John Manley
Ottawa—Vanier	Mauril Bélanger; 30,728	Ray Grant; 4,868	David Gagnon; 5,952	Luc Edmund Barrick; 6,754	Roger Bouchard; 330	Richard Guy Briggs; 651		César Antonio Bello (Ind.); 241; Robert Rival (M-L); 138	Mauril Bélanger
Ottawa West—Nepean	Marlene Catterall; 29,511	Barry Yates; 11,601	Wendy Byrne; 4,163	Margret Kopala; 8,489	Stan Lamothe; 153	Stuart Langstaff; 416		John Turmel (Ind.); 211; Marsha Fine (M-L); 90	Marlene Catterall

== 1993 ==
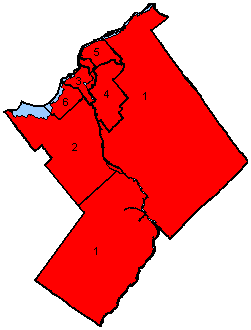
Map of the region's ridings in 1993. Colours show the result from the 1993 election

1. Carleton-Gloucester
2. Nepean
3. Ottawa Centre
4. Ottawa South
5. Ottawa-Vanier
6. Ottawa West

Electoral district	Candidates								Incumbent
Electoral district	PC	Liberal	NDP	Reform	Green	Natural Law	National	Other	Incumbent
Carleton—Gloucester	Thérèse McKellar; 10,598	Eugène Bellemare; 43,212	Cindy Moriarty; 2,575	Ken Binda; 11,474	Alain Doiron; 365	James M. Hea; 461	Shelley Ann Clark; 772	Judy Thompson (CHP); 220; Tom J. Kennedy (Abol.); 80	Eugène Bellemare
Nepean	Donna Hicks; 9,668	Beryl Gaffney; 33,376	Nizam Siddiqu] 1,967	Gus Klovan; 9,114	Andrew van Iterson; 420	Brian Jackson; 255	Ralph Anderson; 979	Brian MacKintosh (Lbt.); 133; Marko Braovac (Com'lth); 105; Tonis Kasvand (Abol.); 33	Beryl Gaffney
Ottawa Centre	Ian R. Lee; 5,453	Mac Harb; 23,816	Marion Dewar; 10,398	Len Tucker; 4,380	Frank Thompson; 545	Neil Paterson; 328	John Foster; 740	Hardial Bains (M-L); 86; Clayoquot Keith Ashdown (Ind.); 71; Pauline G. Morrissette (Abol.); 36; Marie-Thérèse Costisella (Com'lth); 34; Vic Wilczur (Ind.); 0	Mac Harb
Ottawa South	Joe Anton; 6,580	John Paul Manley; 35,705	Ursule Critoph; 2,116	Doug Walkinshaw; 7,749	Joe Palmer; 391	Ronald Parker; 243	George Shirreff; 1,024	Louise Waldman (M-L); 67	John Manley
Ottawa—Vanier	Marie-Christine Lemire; 4,486	Jean-Robert Gauthier; 31,216	Willie Dunn; 2,935	Sam Dancey; 3,553	Frank de Jong; 606	Roger Bouchard; 414	Raymond Samuels; 497	David Talbot (Ind.); 429; Serge Lafortune (M-L); 138; Steven Edward White (Abol.); 28	Jean-Robert Gauthier
Ottawa West	Nancy Munro-Parry; 6,135	Marlene Catterall; 28,012	Norman Bobbitt; 1,854	Peter Boddy; 6,144	Morgan van Wyck; 225	Stan Lamothe; 156	Bryce Wilson; 832	Leonard Knoll (Lbt.); 122; Julie Start (Abol.); 27; Kamal Shah (Com'lth); 22	Marlene Catterall

== 1988 ==
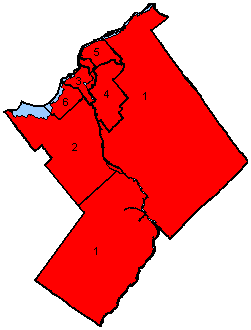
Map of the region's ridings in 1988. Colours show the result from the 1988 election

1. Carleton-Gloucester
2. Nepean
3. Ottawa Centre
4. Ottawa South
5. Ottawa-Vanier
6. Ottawa West

Electoral district	Candidates				Incumbent
Electoral district	PC	Liberal	NDP	Other	Incumbent
Carleton—Gloucester	Maureen McTeer; 23,964	Eugène Bellemare; 30,925	Robert Cottingham; 6,217	Terese Ferri (CHP); 2,728; Peter Francis Godfather Quinlan (Rhino.); 435	new district
Nepean	Bill Tupper; 23,399	Beryl Gaffney; 26,632	Bea Murray; 6,119	Debbie Anne Brennan (Com'lth); 292	Bill Tupper
Ottawa Centre	Bob Plamondon; 13,142	Mac Harb; 18,096	Mike Cassidy; 17,334	John W. Dodson (Green); 300; Leapin Liz Johnson (Rhino.); 292; John Turmel (Ind.); 152; Michael K.B. Hahn (Ind.); 115; Rudolph Shally (Lbt.); 115; Hardial Bains (n/a); 66; Istvan Kovach (C.C.F); 30	Mike Cassidy
Ottawa South	Barry Turner; 19,134	John Manley; 27,740	John Fryer; 7,392	Marc A. Schindler (Lbt.); 146; Jack C. Chambers (Com'lth); 90; Charles Boylan (n/a); 74	Barry Turner
Ottawa—Vanier	Gilles Guénette; 11,197	Jean-Robert Gauthier; 28,581	Kathryn Barnard; 7,712	Charlie le concierge McKenzie (Rhino.); 460; Jean-Claude Viens (n/a); 256; Louis Lang (n/a); 61	Jean-Robert Gauthier
Ottawa West	David Daubney; 18,299	Marlene Catterall; 23,470	Theresa Kavanagh; 5,300	Peter Cavers (Comm.); 156; Donna Petersen (n/a); 130	David Daubney

== 1984 ==
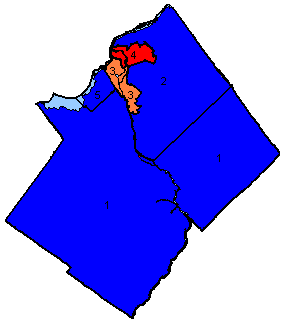
Map of the region's ridings in 1984. Colours show the result from the 1984 election

1. Nepean-Carleton
2. Ottawa-Carleton
3. Ottawa Centre
4. Ottawa-Vanier
5. Ottawa West

Electoral district	Candidates					Incumbent
Electoral district	Liberal	PC	NDP	Green	Other	Incumbent
Nepean—Carleton	Gord Hunter; 20,852	Bill Tupper; 41,663	Bea Murray; 11,035	Gregory Vezina; 737	Ray Turmel (Ind.); 204	Walter Baker†
Ottawa—Carleton	Albert Roy; 30,747	Barry Turner; 34,693	Vernon Lang; 10,760	John W. Dodson; 341	J.C. Reverent Hicks (Rhino.); 648; Mireille Landry-Kennedy (Ind.); 281; Sylvain LaBelle (Com'lth); 69	Jean-Luc Pépin†
Ottawa Centre	John Evans; 15,380	Dan Chilcott; 17,790	Mike Cassidy; 17,844	Gordon Scott McLeod; 285	Barry J. Heidt (Rhino.); 382; Marvin Glass (Comm.); 93; Ray Joseph Cormier (Ind.); 71; Rodger L. James (Ind.); 45; Marc Gauvin (Ind.); 29	John Evans
Ottawa—Vanier	Jean-Robert Gauthier; 21,401	Michel Lamoureux; 12,571	Kathryn Barnard; 9,364		Serge Girard (Ind.); 265	Jean-Robert Gauthier
Ottawa West	Lloyd Francis; 19,314	David Daubney; 26,591	Ross Chapman; 8,304		Thérèse Turmel (Ind.); 285	Lloyd Francis

== 1980 ==
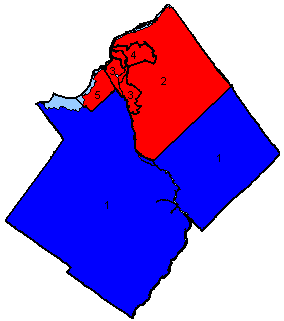
Map of the region's ridings in 1980. Colours show the result from the 1980 election

1. Nepean-Carleton
2. Ottawa-Carleton
3. Ottawa Centre
4. Ottawa-Vanier
5. Ottawa West

Electoral district	Candidates					Incumbent
Electoral district	PC	Liberal	NDP	Rhinoceros	Other	Incumbent
Nepean—Carleton	Walter Baker; 31,498	Gord Hunter; 19,482	Alan White; 7,187	Alan Cockerell; 658		Walter Baker
Ottawa—Carleton	Bert Lawrence; 22,384	Jean-Luc Pépin; 34,960	Don Francis; 7,788		Oli Cosgrove (n./a.); 235	Jean-Luc Pépin
Ottawa Centre	Jean Pigott; 17,181	John Evans; 21,659	John Smart; 7,529	David Langille; 358	Robin Mathews (n.a.); 170; Marvin Glass (Comm.); 116; John Turmel (Ind.); 62; Robin Collins (M-L); 44; Iqbal Ben-Tahir (Ind.); 36; Ernest Bouchard (n.a.); 32	John Evans
Ottawa—Vanier	Moe Royer; 7,379	Jean-Robert Gauthier; 27,564	Jim Stark; 5,721	Graham Pickles Ashby; 519	Gail Dexter Lord (n.a.); 166; Serge LaFortune (M-L); 100	Jean-Robert Gauthier
Ottawa West	Ken Binks; 21,940	Lloyd Francis; 22,460	Abby Pollonetsky; 5,955		John A. Clark (Ind.); 398	Ken Binks

== 1979 ==
Electoral district	Candidates				Incumbent
Electoral district	Liberal	PC	NDP	Other	Incumbent
Nepean—Carleton	Bluma Appel; 17,108	Walter Baker; 36,717	Marnie Girvan; 7,810		Walter Baker; Grenville—Carleton
Ottawa—Carleton	Jean-Luc Pépin; 33,972	Jean Pigott; 26,972	Jill Vickers; 8,234		Jean Pigott
Ottawa Centre	John Evans; 19,758	Robert de Cotret; 18,728	John Smart; 10,213	Other candidates Robin Matthews (n/a); 302; Michael John Charette (Ind.); 191; Marvin Glass (Comm.); 166	Robert de Cotret
Ottawa—Vanier	Jean-Robert Gauthier; 28,098	Moe Royer; 9,098	Paul Michaud; 7,023	Serge Lafortune (M-L); 159	Jean-Robert Gauthier
Ottawa West	Lloyd Francis; 22,985	Ken Binks; 24,981	Abby Pollonetsky; 7,051	John Turmel (Ind.); 193	Lloyd Francis

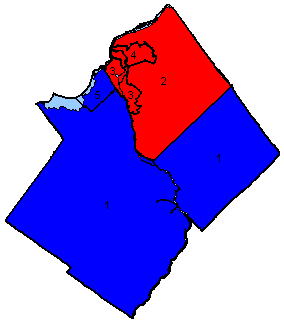
Map of the region's ridings in 1979
1. Nepean-Carleton
2. Ottawa-Carleton
3. Ottawa Centre
4. Ottawa-Vanier
5. Ottawa West

== See also ==
- For earlier results, please see Canadian federal election results in Eastern Ontario.
