= Jamie Heath =

Jamie Heath may refer to:

- Jamey Heath, political activist in Ontario, Canada
- Jamie Heath (cricketer) (born 1977), Australian cricketer
