= Robin Mathews (poet) =

Canadian poet and activist (1931–2023)

Robin Daniel Mathews (November 1, 1931 – April 25, 2023) was a Canadian poet, academic, and political activist against United States foreign policy.

== Education ==
Born in Smithers, British Columbia, Mathews took his Bachelor of Arts in English at the University of British Columbia (UBC), having such professors as Earle Birney. He did an undergraduate honours thesis at UBC on Matthew Arnold and completed his MA at Ohio State University with a thesis on Henry James. After working for a year as a radio producer for the Canadian Broadcasting Corporation, Mathews began a PhD at the University of Toronto where he was an unconvinced student of the mythopoeic theorist and critic Northrop Frye.

== Career ==
Mathews published his first collection of poems in 1961. In the same decade he came to national attention by strongly criticizing United States foreign policy and the complementary colonial attitude of Canadian elites. He also spearheaded the movement to have Canadian literature taught in schools.

Mathews taught at the University of Alberta in Edmonton, Alberta, Carleton University in Ottawa, Ontario, and Simon Fraser University in Burnaby, British Columbia.

Mathews was involved in literary circles in Toronto, Ontario during his years at the University of Toronto while he was doing his doctoral studies. At Toronto he studied under Northrop Frye and was acquainted with both Margaret Atwood and Canadian poet Milton Acorn.

== Works ==
Mathews taught, lectured and wrote numerous volumes of both poetry and prose. His works include the Struggle for Canadian Universities, Treason of the Intellectuals, The Death of Socialism, and Being Canadian in Dirty Imperialist Times. He also published Canadian Identity, an overview of how Canadian identity is constructed by Liberals, Leftists, Conservatives, religion, economics, and socially, published in 1988.

== Politics ==
Mathews was leader of the left wing National Party of Canada from 1979 to 1980s. Mathews ran for office in 1979 as an independent in Ottawa Centre and under the party banner in 1979.

Mathews was involved with the New Democratic Party of Canada prior to 1979.

== Death ==
Mathews died on April 25, 2023, at the age of 91.

== Electoral history ==
1980 Canadian federal election: Ottawa Centre
Party	Candidate	Votes	%	±%
Liberal	John Evans	21,659	45.90	+5.87
Progressive Conservative	Jean Pigott	17,181	36.41	-1.53
New Democratic	John Smart	7,529	15.96	-4.73
Rhinoceros	David Langille	358	0.76	
National	Robin Mathews	170	0.36	-0.25
Communist	Marvin Glass	116	0.25	-0.09
Independent	John Turmel	62	0.13	
Marxist–Leninist	Robin Collins	44	0.09	
Independent	Iqbal Ben-Tahir	36	0.08	
Independent	Ernest Bouchard	32	0.07	
Total valid votes		47,187	100.00	

1979 Canadian federal election: Ottawa Centre
Party	Candidate	Votes	%	±%
Liberal	John Evans	19,758	40.03	+12.53
Progressive Conservative	Robert de Cotret	18,728	37.94	-6.52
New Democratic	John Smart	10,213	20.69	-6.81
Independent	Robin Mathews	302	0.61	
Independent	Michael John Charette	191	0.39	
Communist	Marvin Glass	166	0.34	
Total valid votes		27,163	100.00	
