= Jill Vickers =

Jill Vickers FRSC
- Born: 1942 (age 83–84); England
- Other name: Jill McCalla Vickers
- Political party: New Democratic
- Spouse: Keith Johnson (died 2018)

Academic background
- Education: Carleton University; London School of Economics

Academic work
- Discipline: Political science
- School or tradition: Feminism; socialism
- Institutions: Carleton University

Jill McCalla Vickers FRSC (born 1942) is a Canadian feminist political scientist and retired emeritus professor at Carleton University in Ottawa, Ontario, Canada. She is particularly notable for her work in the field of gender in politics.

== Personal ==
Vickers was born in Britain during the Second World War in 1942, to an English mother and a father who was a Canadian serviceman posted in England. After the war she and her war-bride mother followed her father to Canada, where they resided in Hamilton, Ontario, until her parents' divorce. Thereafter, she and her mother moved to Toronto, where she graduated from Harbord Collegiate.

She briefly attended Queen's University, transferring to Carleton University, where she graduated with a Bachelor of Arts degree in political science in 1965. She moved to London, England, where she studied at the London School of Economics, eventually earning a Doctor of Philosophy in political philosophy. She has been a professor at Carleton since 1971.

She was married to the Carleton history professor Keith Johnson until his death in 2018.

== Politics ==
Vickers is a self-described socialist and long-time activist and supporter of the New Democratic Party. She ran for a seat in the House of Commons of Canada, during the 1979 federal election as the candidate for the NDP for the riding of Ottawa—Carleton. She finished third, behind the Progressive Conservative incumbent Jean Pigott and the victorious Liberal candidate Jean-Luc Pépin.

In 1984, she took part in a well-publicized debate at the University of Toronto on the topic "Socialism or Capitalism: Which Is the Moral System?". Vickers and Gerald Caplan represented the side of socialism, against Objectivist philosophers John Ridpath and Leonard Peikoff.

== Awards and recognitions ==
The Canadian Political Science Association has announced that the Jill Vickers Prize will be awarded to the author of the best paper presented, in English or French, at the annual conference of the Canadian Political Science Association on the topic of gender and politics.

In 2003 Vickers was selected to be a Fellow of the Royal Society of Canada. She is also a Chancellor's Professor of Political Science at Carleton.

== Electoral record ==
1979 Canadian federal election: Ottawa—Carleton
Party	Candidate	Votes	%	±%
Liberal	Jean-Luc Pépin	33,972	49.11	
Progressive Conservative	Jean Pigott	26,972	38.99	
New Democratic	Jill Vickers	8,234	11.90	
Total valid votes		69,178		

Professional and academic associations
Preceded by Alain Noël	President of the Canadian Political Science Association; 2014–2015	Succeeded by William Cross
