= National Party of Canada (1979) =

Federal political party (1979 – c. 1980s)

The National Party of Canada was considered a left-wing nationalist political party that was founded in Canada in 1979 to promote Canadian independence.

The party's leader, Robin Mathews, was an active member and cultural critic for the Waffle movement in the New Democratic Party (NDP).

During the 1980 federal election, held on February 18, 1980, of that year, Mathews ran as the National Party candidate in Ottawa Centre. He placed fifth in a field of 10 candidates, following the Liberal, Progressive Conservative, NDP and Rhinoceros Party candidates but ahead of three independents: John Turmel, a Communist, and a Marxist–Leninist.) Mathews collected 171 votes, or 0.39% of the total.

Don Hayward was the party's candidate in the Toronto riding of Broadview—Greenwood. He received 53 votes (0.17%), finishing seventh against New Democratic Party candidate Bob Rae. A 33-year-old factory worker, he expressed concern about American dominance of Canadian industry.

The party dissolved during the later part of the 1980s.

It should not be confused with the National Party that nominated candidates in the 1993 election.

== See also ==
- List of political parties in Canada
