= List of Canadian ministers of industry, trade and commerce =

The following is a list of Canadian ministers of industry.

	Name	Ministry	Dates
1.	Jean-Luc Pépin	under Trudeau	April 1, 1969 November 16, 1972
2.	Alastair Gillespie	under Trudeau	November 27, 1972 – September 25, 1975
3.	Donald Campbell Jamieson	under Trudeau	September 26, 1975 – September 13, 1976
4.	Joseph Jacques Jean Chrétien	under Trudeau	September 14, 1976 – September 15, 1977
5.	John Henry Horner	under Trudeau	September 16, 1977 – June 3, 1979
6.	Robert René de Cotret	under Clark	June 4, 1979 – March 2, 1980
7.	Herb Gray	under Trudeau	March 3, 1980 – September 29, 1982
8.	Edward C. Lumley	under Trudeau	September 30, 1982 – December 6, 1983
