= Ottawa Centre (federal electoral district) =

Federal electoral district in Ontario, Canada

Coordinates: 45°25′N 75°42′W

Ontario electoral district
- Interactive map of riding boundaries from the 2025 federal election

Federal electoral district
- Legislature: House of Commons
MP
Yasir Naqvi
Liberal
- District created: 1966
- First contested: 1968
- Last contested: 2025
- District webpage: profile, map

Demographics
- Population (2011): 113,619
- Electors (2015): 89,360
- Area (km²): 35
- Pop. density (per km²): 3,246.3
- Census division: Ottawa
- Census subdivision: Ottawa (part)

Ottawa Centre (French: Ottawa-Centre) is an urban federal electoral district in Ontario, Canada, that has been represented in the House of Commons of Canada since 1968. While the riding's boundaries (mainly to the south and west as the north and east borders have remained the Ottawa River and Rideau River, respectively) have changed over the years to account for population changes, the riding has always comprised the central areas of Ottawa, the nation's capital.

The House of Commons of Canada meets in the West Block of the Parliament Buildings on Parliament Hill, which is located within this district.

== History ==
The riding was created in 1966 from Carleton, Ottawa West and Ottawa East ridings. It initially consisted of the area of Ottawa north of the Rideau River, west of a line following the Rideau Canal to the Canadian Pacific Railway line (currently about where Nicholas Street is), and generally east of Bayswater Road (now Ave.), and south of the CPR line where the O-Train currently is.

=== 1976 Federal Redistribution ===
The 1976 redistribution saw significant changes to the riding. It lost territory around Mechanicsville (north of Wellington Street West, west of the current O-Train) and Old Ottawa East (north of Clegg St), while gaining all of the Civic Hospital and Hintonburg neighbourhoods east of Holland Avenue and south of Wellington, Carleton Heights, Riverside Park and the Hunt Club area west of the current O-Train line.

=== 1987 Federal Redistribution ===
The 1987 redistribution saw the riding expand westward to Island Park Drive, while losing all of its territory south of the Rideau River. Additionally, the riding gained back all of Old Ottawa East south of The Queensway.

=== 1996 Federal Redistribution ===
The 1996 redistribution saw the riding expand further westward to Sherbourne Road / Maitland Avenue north of the Queensway, as well as gaining the eastern half of Carlington (east of Merivale Road). Also, the area of Old Ottawa East north of the Queensway was added back to the riding.

=== 2003 Federal Redistribution ===
The riding did not change its boundaries in 2003.

=== 2012 Federal Redistribution ===
Following the Canadian federal electoral redistribution, 2012, there was a minor change in the riding's southwestern boundary, which was moved from the former city limits to Baseline Road and Fisher Avenue.

=== 2022 Federal Redistribution ===
The 2022 Canadian federal electoral redistribution has become law and came into effect for the 2025 Canadian federal election.

Several neighbourhoods in the west end of the riding were moved to Ottawa West—Nepean following the redistribution. North of the Queensway the western boundary was moved from Maitland Ave and Sherbourne Rd east to Golden Ave and then along Carling Avenue. As a result, the neighbourhoods of McKellar Park and McKellar Heights were shifted to Ottawa West—Nepean.

The south-west boundary along Merivale Rd was moved east to Fisher Ave, reallocating the entire Carlington neighbourhood to Ottawa West—Nepean (previously the eastern portion of Carlington was within Ottawa Centre).

This was somewhat compensated for by changes in the riding's southern boundary, which pushed south and east of the Rideau River for the first time following Bank Street and the railway line north of Heron Rd. This change affected the neighbourhoods of Riverside Park, Billings Bridge and Heron Park which were transferred from Ottawa South.

=== Members of Parliament ===
The riding was won in the 1984 election by New Democrat Mike Cassidy. The riding was subsequently won by Liberal Mac Harb in the 1988 election who held it until 2003 when he was appointed to the Senate. The riding was left vacant by Prime Minister Paul Martin until the 2004 election when Ed Broadbent, a former leader of the NDP, defeated Liberal Richard Mahoney, a high-profile lawyer and Liberal strategist and long-time ally of former Prime Minister Paul Martin. The other candidates in 2004 were Mike Murphy of the Conservatives, David Chernushenko of the Greens, Louis Lang of the Marxist-Leninists, Michael Foster, Stuart Ryan of the Communists, Robert Gauthier, and Carla Marie Dancey. Paul Dewar, son of former Ottawa mayor, Marion Dewar, held the riding from 2006 until 2015. Notably, Dewar won the riding with 52 percent of ballots cast in the 2011 federal election.

Ottawa Centre is represented in the House of Commons of Canada by Yasir Naqvi from the Liberal Party of Canada.

Parliament	Years	Member	Party
Ottawa Centre; Riding created from Carleton, Ottawa West and Ottawa East
28th	1968–1972	George McIlraith	Liberal
29th	1972–1974	Hugh Poulin	Liberal
30th	1974–1978	Hugh Poulin	Liberal
30th	1978–1979	Robert de Cotret	Progressive Conservative
31st	1979–1980	John Leslie Evans	Liberal
32nd	1980–1984	John Leslie Evans	Liberal
33rd	1984–1988	Michael Cassidy	New Democratic
34th	1988–1993	Mac Harb	Liberal
35th	1993–1997	Mac Harb	Liberal
36th	1997–2000	Mac Harb	Liberal
37th	2000–2003	Mac Harb	Liberal
38th	2004–2006	Ed Broadbent	New Democratic
39th	2006–2008	Paul Dewar	New Democratic
40th	2008–2011	Paul Dewar	New Democratic
41st	2011–2015	Paul Dewar	New Democratic
42nd	2015–2019	Catherine McKenna	Liberal
43rd	2019–2021	Catherine McKenna	Liberal
44th	2021–2025	Yasir Naqvi	Liberal
45th	2025–present	Yasir Naqvi	Liberal

== Geography ==
The riding covers most of downtown Ottawa, including the Parliament Buildings. From the Rideau River, the riding stretches west encompassing the neighbourhoods of Downtown, Centretown (Centretown West which includes Little Italy is usually considered a distinct neighbourhood), LeBreton Flats, Civic Hospital, Mechanicsville, Hintonburg, Wellington Village, Westboro, eastern part of Carlington, Highland Park, and McKellar Park. The riding encompasses additional neighbourhoods south of downtown, including The Glebe, Old Ottawa South, Lees Avenue, Old Ottawa East and others.

Many public sector workers live in the riding. The northern part of the riding contains many government office buildings, including Parliament Hill. The riding also includes Carleton University and Saint Paul University's (where many UOttawa students have residence) campuses and residences.

== Demographics ==
According to the 2021 Canadian census

Ethnic groups: 72.4% White, 5.5% Black, 4.5% Chinese, 4.1% South Asian, 3.8% Indigenous, 2.4% Arab, 1.7% Southeast Asian, 1.4% Latin American, 1.0% West Asian
Languages: 67.0% English, 9.1% French, 1.9% Arabic, 1.8% Mandarin, 1.5% Spanish, 1.1% Cantonese, 1.1% Italian
Religions: 42.2% Christian (22.9% Catholic, 4.4% Anglican, 3.4% United Church, 1.8% Christian Orthodox, 1.0% Presbyterian, 8.7% Other), 4.8% Muslim, 2.0% Jewish, 1.4% Hindu, 1.3% Buddhist, 46.9% None
Median income: $54,800 (2020)
Average income: $77,800 (2020)

The Ottawa Centre riding has the highest percentage of master's degree holders in all of Canada (12.7%)

In the 2015 election, the riding had the highest turnout in the country with just over 82% of electors casting a ballot in the election.

== Election results ==
Graph of election results in Ottawa Centre (parties that never got 2% of the vote are omitted) View source data.

=== 2025 federal election ===
2025 Canadian federal election
Party	Candidate	Votes	%	±%
Liberal	Yasir Naqvi	51,026	62.73	+17.50
New Democratic	Joel Harden	15,935	19.59	–13.12
Conservative	Paul D'Orsonnens	12,692	15.60	–0.68
Green	Amanda Rosenstock	916	1.13	–1.67
Canadian Future	Andrea Chabot	268	0.33	N/A
Christian Heritage	Marie-Chantal Leriche	234	0.29	N/A
Communist	Cashton Perry	154	0.19	-0.09
Independent	Mike Salmon	66	0.08	N/A
Independent	Zed Chebib	47	0.06	N/A
Total valid votes		81,338	99.26	
Total rejected ballots		604	0.74	+0.05
Turnout		81,942	77.43	+2.99
Eligible voters		105,823		
Liberal notional hold		Swing		+15.31
Source: Elections Canada

=== 2021 federal election ===
2021 federal election redistributed results
Party	Vote	%
Liberal	33,549	45.24
New Democratic	24,258	32.71
Conservative	12,073	16.28
Green	2,074	2.80
People's	1,659	2.24
Animal Protection	230	0.31
Communist	206	0.28
Independent	112	0.15
Total valid votes	74,161	99.32
Rejected ballots	511	0.68
Registered voters/ estimated turnout	100,157	74.55

2021 Canadian federal election
Party	Candidate	Votes	%	±%	Expenditures
Liberal	Yasir Naqvi	33,825	45.50	–3.16	$123,140.48
New Democratic	Angella MacEwen	24,552	33.03	+3.99	$119,016.95
Conservative	Carol Clemenhagen	11,650	15.67	+3.10	$87,213.88
Green	Angela Keller-Herzog	2,115	2.84	–4.56	$34,113.84
People's	Regina Watteel	1,605	2.16	+1.25	$8,682.43
Animal Protection	Shelby Bertrand	261	0.35	+0.09	$3,741.29
Communist	Alex McDonald	201	0.27	+0.13	$0.00
Independent	Rich Joyal	132	0.18	-	none listed
Total valid votes/expense limit		74,341	–	–	$124,204.20
Total valid votes		74,341			
Total rejected ballots		497			
Turnout		74,838	77.17		
Eligible voters		96,979			
Liberal hold		Swing		–3.58	
Source: Elections Canada

=== 2019 federal election ===
Still holding the Cabinet post of Environment Minister, Ms McKenna was challenged by a new NDP candidate, Emilie Taman, along with other challengers Carol Clemenhagen for the Conservative Party, Angela Keller-Herzog for the Green Party, and Merylee Sevilla for the People's Party. Ms McKenna gained over 4,000 votes from the previous election in 2015, beating her nearest rival by over 15,000 votes.

2019 Canadian federal election
Party	Candidate	Votes	%	±%	Expenditures
Liberal	Catherine McKenna	38,391	48.66	+5.99	$113,154.09
New Democratic	Emilie Taman	22,916	29.04	-9.50	$119,073.61
Conservative	Carol Clemenhagen	9,920	12.57	-1.92	$63,743.89
Green	Angela Keller-Herzog	5,837	7.40	+4.42	none listed
People's	Merylee Sevilla	720	0.91	–	$2,536.21
Libertarian	Coreen Corcoran	360	0.46	-0.27	$1,030.86
Animal Protection	Shelby Bertrand	207	0.26	–	none listed
Christian Heritage	Marie-Chantal Leriche	198	0.25	–	none listed
Independent	Chris G. Jones	177	0.22	–	$3,526.62
Communist	Stuart Ryan	111	0.14	-0.02	$496.90
Independent	Giang Ha Thu Vo	65	0.08	–	none listed
Total valid votes/expense limit		78,902	99.39		
Total rejected ballots		482	0.61	+0.10	
Turnout		79,384	78.43	-1.57	
Eligible voters		101,219			
Liberal hold		Swing		+7.74	
Source: Elections Canada

=== 2015 federal election ===
Ottawa Centre lost a sliver of territory to Ottawa West—Nepean, as its southwestern border moved from the former Ottawa City limits to Fisher Avenue and Baseline Road. The total population of this area lost (2011 Census) was 424.

Ottawa Centre saw the highest turnout in the entire country in the 2015 election.

2015 Canadian federal election
Party	Candidate	Votes	%	±%	Expenditures
Liberal	Catherine McKenna	32,111	42.66	+22.54	$192,865.14
New Democratic	Paul Dewar	29,098	38.54	-13.62	$196,692.80
Conservative	Damian Konstantinakos	10,943	14.49	-7.14	$74,191.60
Green	Tom Milroy	2,246	2.97	-2.06	$5,564.56
Libertarian	Dean T. Harris	551	0.73	–	–
Rhinoceros	Conrad Lukawski	167	0.22	–	$2.96
Marijuana	John Andrew Omowole Akpata	160	0.21	–	–
Communist	Stuart Ryan	124	0.16	-0.01	–
Total valid votes/Expense limit		75,500	99.49		$233,540.54
Total rejected ballots		386	0.51	–	
Turnout		75,886	80.00	–	
Eligible voters		94,858			
Liberal gain from New Democratic		Swing		+18.08	
Source: Elections Canada

2011 federal election redistributed results
Party	Vote	%
New Democratic	33,737	52.16
Conservative	13,992	21.63
Liberal	13,014	20.12
Green	3,256	5.03
Others	685	1.06

=== 2011 federal election ===
2011 Canadian federal election
Party	Candidate	Votes	%	±%
New Democratic	Paul Dewar	33,805	52.11	+12.38
Conservative	Damian Konstantinakos	14,063	21.68	-1.89
Liberal	Scott Bradley	13,049	20.12	-5.91
Green	Jen Hunter	3,262	5.03	-4.90
Marijuana	John Andrew Akpata	326	0.50	-0.09
Independent	Romeo Bellai	210	0.32	–
Communist	Stuart Ryan	109	0.17	–
Marxist–Leninist	Pierre Soublière	44	0.07	-0.08
Total valid votes/Expense limit		64,868	99.59	
Total rejected ballots		267	0.41	-0.00
Turnout		65,135	72.37	+3.26
Eligible voters		90,008		
New Democratic hold		Swing		+7.13

=== 2008 federal election ===
2008 Canadian federal election
Party	Candidate	Votes	%	±%	Expenditures
New Democratic	Paul Dewar	25,399	39.74	+2.81	$74,532
Liberal	Penny Collenette	16,633	26.02	−3.18	$85,082
Conservative	Brian McGarry	15,065	23.57	+0.87	$85,487
Green	Jen Hunter	6,348	9.93	−0.22	$41,577
Marijuana	John Akpata	378	0.59	+0.01	none listed
Marxist–Leninist	Pierre Soublière	95	0.15	+0.05	none listed
Total valid votes/expenditure limit		63,918	100.00	–	$91,849
Total rejected ballots		266	0.41		
Turnout		64,184	69.11		
Electors on the lists		92,877			
New Democratic hold		Swing		+3.0	

=== 2006 federal election ===
Broadbent announced in 2005 that he would not run for re-election so he could devote more time to care for his ailing wife, Lucille. Richard Mahoney was again the Liberal candidate, hoping that, without an opposing star candidate, such as Broadbent, he would be elected this time. The NDP nominated Paul Dewar, a teacher and son of former mayor Marion Dewar. As the Liberal national numbers declined over the course of the campaign, it seemed more likely that the NDP could retain the seat. Mahoney went on the offensive late in the campaign, claiming a vote for Paul Dewar would help the Conservatives. Dewar retained most of Broadbent's voters and won by over 5000 votes. The riding also gave the Green Party of Canada one of its best performances nationwide with over 6,500 votes, over 10%.

2006 Canadian federal election
Party	Candidate	Votes	%	±%
New Democratic	Paul Dewar	24,611	36.93	-4.12
Liberal	Richard Mahoney	19,458	29.20	-1.87
Conservative	Keith Fountain	15,126	22.70	+3.67
Green	David Chernushenko	6,766	10.15	+2.61
Marijuana	John Akpata	386	0.58	-0.14
Independent	Anwar Syed	121	0.18	
Communist	Stuart Ryan	102	0.15	+0.01
Marxist–Leninist	Christian Legeais	68	0.10	-0.02
Total valid votes		66,638	100.00	
New Democratic Party hold		Swing	-1.1	

2006 nomination contests

New Democratic Party
Candidate	Residence	June 22, 2005
Tiffani Murray	Ottawa	
Jamey Heath	Ottawa	
Paul Dewar	Ottawa	X
Shannon Lee Mannion	Ottawa	

Liberal Party of Canada
Candidate	Residence	May 17, 2005
Richard Mahoney	Ottawa	X

Conservative Party of Canada
Candidate	Residence	May 15, 2005
Keith A. Fountain	Ottawa	X
Guy Dufort	Ottawa	
Idris Ben-Tahir	Ottawa	

=== 2004 federal election ===
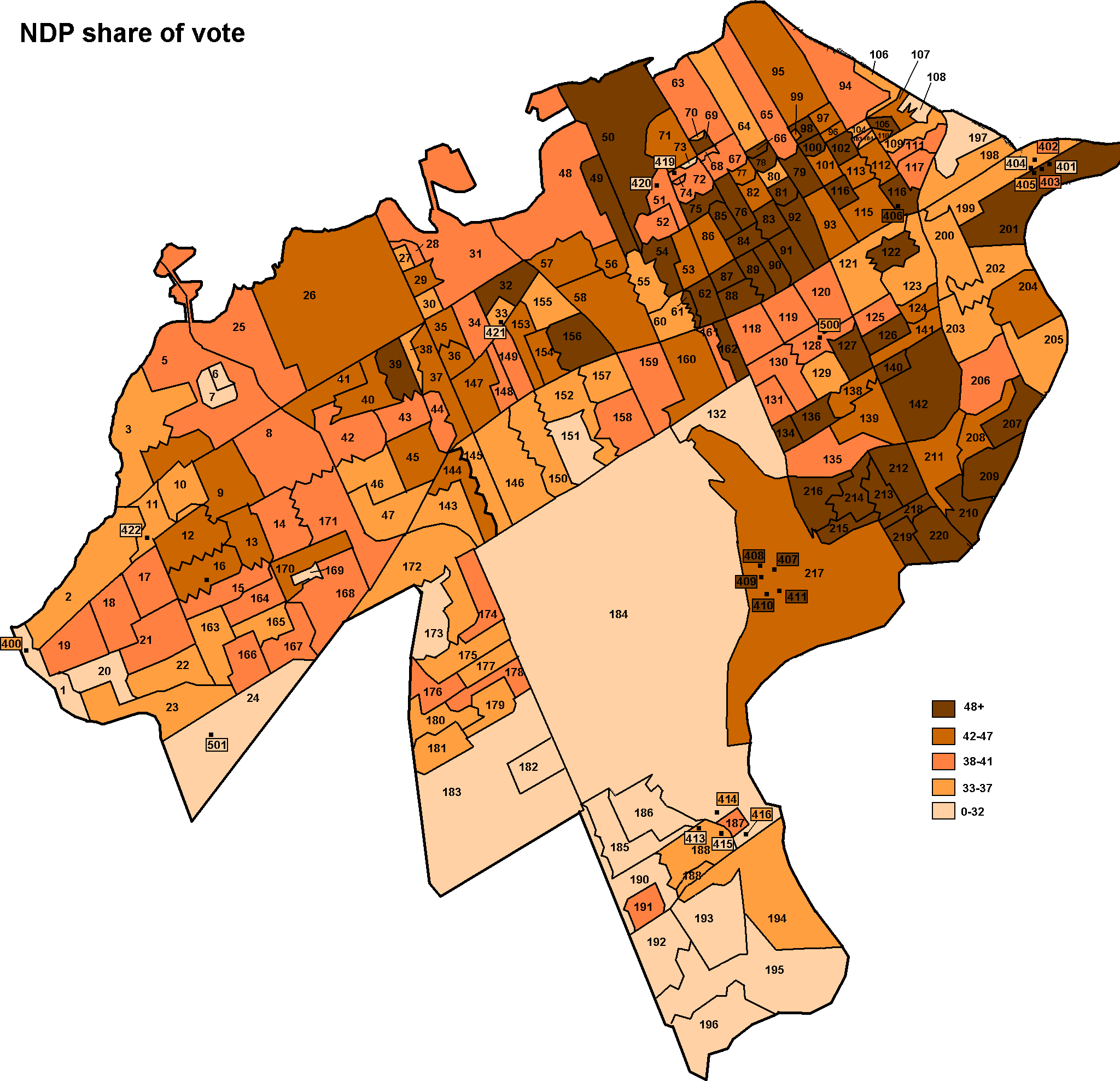
A map showing the distribution of the NDP vote in the 2004 election. Ed Broadbent did best in Old Ottawa South and the western part of Centretown

The 2004 election was an unusual campaign in Ottawa Centre. The seat was vacated in September 2003 when Liberal incumbent Mac Harb received his patronage appointment to the Senate of Canada from outgoing Prime Minister Jean Chrétien. Paul Martin loyalist Richard Mahoney won the Liberal nomination and expected to win the riding.

Former NDP leader and widely respected statesman Ed Broadbent came out of political retirement to win the NDP nomination in January. As the seat was vacant, a by-election was expected to fill the seat and campaigning began in early 2004. However, Prime Minister Paul Martin delayed calling the by-election, in the expectation that a general election would soon be called.

In May 2004, a federal election was called, pre-empting the by-election. Broadbent was increasingly favoured to win, a mid-campaign poll showed him ahead. In addition to Broadbent's personal popularity, the NDP under new leader Jack Layton had greatly increased its popularity, especially in urban Ontario. The campaign was still hard-fought. In the end, Broadbent won a strong victory, and subsequently announced his retirement the following year, in April 2005.

2004 Canadian federal election
Party	Candidate	Votes	%	Expenditures
New Democratic	Ed Broadbent	25,734	41.05	$75,600.35
Liberal	Richard Mahoney	19,478	31.07	$77,325.72
Conservative	Mike Murphy	11,933	19.03	$37,895.42
Green	David Chernushenko	4,730	7.54	$24,313.40
Marijuana	Michael Foster	455	0.72	–
Independent	Robert Gauthier	121	0.19	–
Communist	Stuart Ryan	90	0.14	$379.63
Canadian Action	Carla Marie Dancey	76	0.12	–
Marxist–Leninist	Louis Lang	67	0.10	–
Total valid votes		62,684	100.00	
Total rejected ballots		270		
Turnout		62,954	70.35	

2004 nomination contests

New Democratic Party
Candidate	Residence	January 20, 2004
Ed Broadbent	Ottawa	X
Paul Dewar	Ottawa	

Conservative Party of Canada
Candidate	Residence	March 29, 2004
Mark P. Donnelly	Ottawa	
Michael J. Murphy	Ottawa	X

=== Previous elections ===
2000 Canadian federal election
Party	Candidate	Votes	%	±%
Liberal	Mac Harb	22,710	40.00	-5.19
New Democratic	Heather-Jane Robertson	13,516	23.81	+0.08
Alliance	David Brown	10,167	17.91	+6.34
Progressive Conservative	Beverly Mitchell	7,505	13.22	-3.11
Green	Chris Bradshaw	1,531	2.70	+1.21
Marijuana	Brad Powers	813	1.43	
Canadian Action	Carla Marie Dancey	210	0.37	-0.04
Communist	Marvin Glass	139	0.24	
Natural Law	Neil Paterson	111	0.20	
Marxist–Leninist	Mistahi Corkill	66	0.12	-0.14
Total valid votes		56,768	100.00	

Note: Canadian Alliance vote is compared to the Reform vote in 1997 election.

1997 Canadian federal election
Party	Candidate	Votes	%	±%
Liberal	Mac Harb	25,987	45.19	-6.71
New Democratic	Jamey Heath	13,646	23.73	+1.07
Progressive Conservative	Peter Annis	9,391	16.33	+4.45
Reform	John Perocchio	6,651	11.57	+2.03
Green	Frank de Jong	855	1.49	+0.30
Canadian Action	Howard Bertram	236	0.41	
Natural Law	Neil Paterson	211	0.37	-0.34
Independent	Susan Cumby	190	0.33	
Marxist–Leninist	Hardial Bains	150	0.26	+0.07
Independent	Malek Khouri	92	0.16	
Independent	Ray Joseph Cormier	91	0.16	
Total valid votes		57,500	100.00	

1993 Canadian federal election
Party	Candidate	Votes	%	±%
Liberal	Mac Harb	25,962	51.91	+15.46
New Democratic	Marion Dewar	11,238	22.47	-12.45
Progressive Conservative	Ian R. Lee	6,126	12.25	-14.23
Reform	Len Tucker	4,700	9.40	
National	John Foster	796	1.59	
Green	Frank Thompson	595	1.19	+0.59
Natural Law	Neil Paterson	352	0.70	
Marxist–Leninist	Hardial Bains	91	0.18	+0.05
Independent	Clayoquot Keith Ashdown	75	0.15	
Abolitionist	Pauline G. Morrissette	37	0.07	
Commonwealth of Canada	Marie-Thérèse Costisella	37	0.07	+0.01
Total valid votes		50,009	100.00	

1988 Canadian federal election
Party	Candidate	Votes	%	±%
Liberal	Mac Harb	18,096	36.46	+6.84
New Democratic	Mike Cassidy	17,334	34.92	+0.55
Progressive Conservative	Bob Plamondon	13,142	26.48	−7.78
Green	John W. Dodson	300	0.60	+0.05
Rhinoceros	Leapin Liz Johnson	292	0.59	−0.15
Independent	John Turmel	152	0.31	
Independent	Michael K.B. Hahn	115	0.23	
Libertarian	Rudolph Shally	111	0.22	
Independent	Hardial Bains	66	0.13	
Commonwealth of Canada	Istvan Kovach	30	0.06	
Total valid votes		49,638	100.00	
Source(s) "History of Federal Ridings — General Elections — OTTAWA CENTRE, Ontario (1966- )". Parliament of Canada.

1984 Canadian federal election
Party	Candidate	Votes	%	±%
New Democratic	Mike Cassidy	17,844	34.37	+18.41
Progressive Conservative	Dan Chilcott	17,790	34.26	−2.15
Liberal	John Evans	15,380	29.62	−16.28
Rhinoceros	Barry J. Heidt	382	0.74	−0.02
Green	Gordon Scott McLeod	285	0.55	
Communist	Marvin Glass	93	0.18	−0.07
Independent	Ray Joseph Cormier	71	0.14	
Independent	Rodger L. James	45	0.09	
Independent	Marc Gauvin	29	0.06	
Total valid votes		51,919	100.00	
Source(s) "History of Federal Ridings — General Elections — OTTAWA CENTRE, Ontario (1966- )". Parliament of Canada.

1980 Canadian federal election
Party	Candidate	Votes	%	±%
Liberal	John Evans	21,659	45.90	+5.87
Progressive Conservative	Jean Pigott	17,181	36.41	-1.53
New Democratic	John Smart	7,529	15.96	-4.73
Rhinoceros	David Langille	358	0.76	
National	Robin Mathews	170	0.36	-0.25
Communist	Marvin Glass	116	0.25	-0.09
Independent	John Turmel	62	0.13	
Marxist–Leninist	Robin Collins	44	0.09	
Independent	Iqbal Ben-Tahir	36	0.08	
Independent	Ernest Bouchard	32	0.07	
Total valid votes		47,187	100.00	

1979 Canadian federal election
Party	Candidate	Votes	%	±%
Liberal	John Evans	19,758	40.03	+12.53
Progressive Conservative	Robert de Cotret	18,728	37.94	-6.52
New Democratic	John Smart	10,213	20.69	-6.81
Independent	Robin Mathews	302	0.61	
Independent	Michael John Charette	191	0.39	
Communist	Marvin Glass	166	0.34	
Total valid votes		27,163	100.00	

By-election on October 16, 1978
Party	Candidate	Votes	%	±%
Progressive Conservative	Robert de Cotret	12,078	44.46	+10.10
New Democratic	Steven W. Langdon	7,470	27.50	+8.42
Liberal	Bryce Mackasey	7,361	27.10	-16.23
Independent	Michael John Houlton	254	0.94	
Total valid votes		27,163	100.00	

1974 Canadian federal election
Party	Candidate	Votes	%	±%
Liberal	Hugh Poulin	15,308	43.33	+4.81
Progressive Conservative	Hugh Segal	12,138	34.36	-0.87
New Democratic	Irving Greenberg	6,739	19.08	-6.04
Independent	Bela Egyed	877	2.48	
Social Credit	John Graham	139	0.39	-0.26
Independent	Ray Quann	63	0.18	
Marxist–Leninist	Phil Sarazen	62	0.18	
Total valid votes		35,326	100.00	

1972 Canadian federal election
Party	Candidate	Votes	%	±%
Liberal	Hugh Poulin	14,101	38.52	-19.22
Progressive Conservative	Hugh Segal	12,899	35.23	+1.01
New Democratic	Irving Greenberg	9,195	25.12	+17.07
Social Credit	Rocco Zavarella	237	0.65	
Independent	Paul Herman	177	0.48	
Total valid votes		36,609	100.00	

1968 Canadian federal election
Party	Candidate	Votes	%
Liberal	George McIlraith	19,578	57.74
Progressive Conservative	Murray A. Heit	11,602	34.22
New Democratic	June B. Ralph	2,729	8.05
Total valid votes		33,909	100.00

== See also ==
- Ottawa Centre (provincial electoral district)
- List of Canadian electoral districts
- Historical federal electoral districts of Canada
