= Hugh Poulin =

Canadian lawyer, judge, and politician (1931–2018)

Fabian Hugh Poulin

Member of Parliament for Ottawa Centre
- In office October 1972 – April 1978
- Preceded by: George McIlraith
- Succeeded by: Robert de Cotret

Personal details
- Born: 9 February 1931 Ottawa, Ontario, Canada
- Died: 12 October 2018 (aged 87) Ottawa, Ontario
- Party: Liberal
- Spouse: Maureen Poulin
- Children: Fabian Poulin, John Poulin, Diana Murphy, Elizabeth Dean, Carole Léger
- Profession: Lawyer and Judge

Fabian Hugh Poulin (9 February 1931 – 12 October 2018) was a lawyer, judge, and former Liberal Party member of the House of Commons of Canada.

He graduated in 1959 from Osgoode Hall Law School in Toronto

He was first elected at the Ottawa Centre riding in the 1972 general election, then re-elected there in the 1974 election. Poulin left federal politics on 27 April 1978 before completing his term in the 30th Canadian Parliament to become a judge of the Ontario Superior Court of Justice. Poulin had three daughters: Diana, Elizabeth, and Carole and two sons: Fabian and John.
