= Ottawa—Carleton (electoral district) =

Former federal electoral district in Ontario, Canada

Ontario electoral district

Defunct federal electoral district
- Legislature: House of Commons
- District created: 1966
- District abolished: 1987
- First contested: 1968
- Last contested: 1984

Ottawa–Carleton was a federal electoral district in Ontario, Canada that was represented in the House of Commons of Canada from 1968 to 1988. This riding was created in 1966 from parts of Carleton, Ottawa East and Russell ridings.

It initially consisted of the eastern parts of the city of Ottawa, the Village of Rockcliffe Park, the Township of Gloucester excluding Long Island, and the Township of Cumberland.

In 1976, the city of Ottawa parts of the riding were redefined.

The electoral district was abolished in 1987 when it was redistributed between Gloucester–Carleton, Ottawa South and Ottawa—Vanier ridings.

== Members of Parliament ==
This riding has elected the following members of Parliament:

Parliament	Years	Member	Party
Riding created from Carleton, Ottawa East and Russell
28th	1968–1972	John Turner	Liberal
29th	1972–1974	John Turner	Liberal
30th	1974–1976	John Turner	Liberal
30th	1976–1979	Jean Pigott	Progressive Conservative
31st	1979–1980	Jean-Luc Pépin	Liberal
32nd	1980–1984	Jean-Luc Pépin	Liberal
33rd	1984–1988	Barry Turner	Progressive Conservative
Riding dissolved into Gloucester—Carleton, Ottawa South and Ottawa—Vanier

== Election results ==
1968 Canadian federal election
Party	Candidate	Votes
Liberal	John Turner	28,987
Progressive Conservative	Kenneth C. Binks	11,665
New Democratic Party	Harold B. Wilson	3,115

1972 Canadian federal election
Party	Candidate	Votes
Liberal	John Turner	31,316
Progressive Conservative	Strome Galloway	22,641
New Democratic Party	Doris Shackleton	11,225
Social Credit	David Morse	839

1974 Canadian federal election
Party	Candidate	Votes
Liberal	John Turner	38,463
Progressive Conservative	Bill Neville	27,588
New Democratic Party	Dave Hall	6,014

By-election: On Mr. Turner's resignation, 18 October 1976
Party	Candidate	Votes
Progressive Conservative	Jean Pigott	34,477
Liberal	Henri L. Rocque	18,796
New Democratic Party	Steven W. Langdon	12,777
No affiliation	Stewart I. Crawford	716
Independent	Robert A. Leber	602

1979 Canadian federal election
Party	Candidate	Votes
Liberal	Jean-Luc Pépin	33,972
Progressive Conservative	Jean Pigott	26,972
New Democratic Party	Jill Vickers	8,234

1980 Canadian federal election
Party	Candidate	Votes
Liberal	Jean-Luc Pépin	34,960
Progressive Conservative	Bert Lawrence	22,384
New Democratic Party	Don Francis	7,788
No affiliation	Oli Cosgrove	235

1984 Canadian federal election
Party	Candidate	Votes
Progressive Conservative	Barry Turner	34,693
Liberal	Albert J. Roy	30,747
New Democratic	Vernon Lang	10,760
Rhinoceros	J.C. Reverent Hicks	648
Green	John W. Dodson	341
Independent	Mireille Landry-Kennedy	281
Commonwealth of Canada	Sylvain Labelle	69

== See also ==
- List of Canadian electoral districts
- Historical federal electoral districts of Canada
