= Paul Dewar =

Canadian politician and educator (1963–2019)

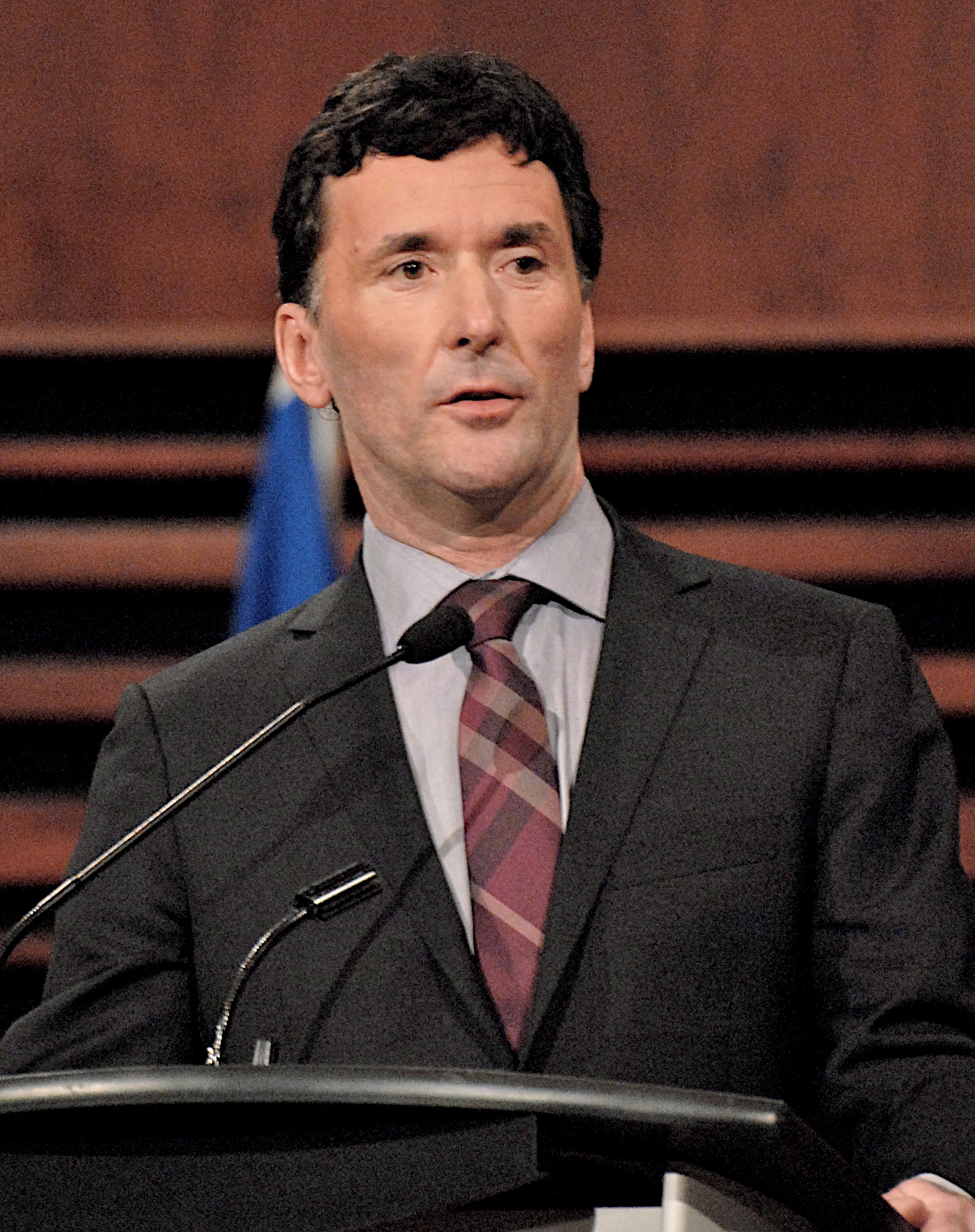

Member of Parliament for Ottawa Centre
- In office January 23, 2006 – August 4, 2015
- Preceded by: Ed Broadbent
- Succeeded by: Catherine McKenna

First Vice-President of the Ottawa-Carleton Elementary Teachers' Federation
- In office 2004–2006

Personal details
- Born: Paul Wilson Dewar; January 25, 1963 Ottawa, Ontario
- Died: February 6, 2019 (aged 56) Ottawa, Ontario
- Party: New Democratic Party
- Relations: Marion Dewar (mother)
- Education: Queen's University; Carleton University
- Occupation: Labour and social activist, teacher, union officer
- Committees: Member, Standing Committee on Foreign Affairs and International Development (2007–2015); Member, Special Committee on the Canadian Mission in Afghanistan (2009–2011); Vice-Chair, Standing Joint Committee on Scrutiny of Regulations (2006–2007)
- Website: pauldewar.ndp.ca

Paul Wilson Dewar (January 25, 1963 – February 6, 2019) was a Canadian educator and politician from Ottawa, Ontario. He was the New Democratic Party (NDP) Member of Parliament (MP) for the riding of Ottawa Centre.

Dewar was first elected to the House of Commons in the 2006 federal election. He served as the Official Opposition Critic for Foreign Affairs, until he left the post in October 2011 to run for the leadership of the NDP. Dewar lost his seat during the 2015 federal election which saw the NDP lose all of its seats in Eastern Ontario. Before entering politics he worked as a teacher and was an elected representative of the Ottawa-Carleton Elementary Teachers' Federation.

== Background ==
Dewar was born in Ottawa, Ontario, on January 25, 1963, to parents Ken Dewar and former Ottawa mayor and New Democratic Member of Parliament, Marion Dewar. When he was in grade three, Dewar was diagnosed with dyslexia, after his teacher noticed that he was struggling to read and write. He earned a Bachelor of Arts degree from Carleton University in political science and economics in 1985.

Not long after he completed his Bachelor of Arts, Dewar embarked on a five-month trip to Nicaragua, where he volunteered as an aid worker. Following his return to Ottawa, he began working as constituency assistant to Ontario Minister of Health and NDP Member of Provincial Parliament for Ottawa Centre, Evelyn Gigantes. Dewar served in this position from 1990 to 1995. It was during this time that he met his wife, Julia Sneyd. They later had two children together: Nathaniel and Jordan.

Dewar attained a Bachelor of Education degree from Queen's University in 1994. He went on to work as an elementary school teacher at D. Roy Kennedy Public School and as an English teacher at Hopewell Avenue Public School. His work with students with special needs led Queen's University to award him the A. Lorne Cassidy Award.

While working at the schools, Dewar became involved with his union, the Ottawa-Carleton Elementary Teachers' Federation (OCETF; a local of the Elementary Teachers' Federation of Ontario). After having served as a member of OCETF Executive and as the chair of their political action committee, he was elected Second Vice-President in 2001 and First Vice-President in 2004. During his time with the union, Dewar played a major role in reviving the OCETF's political action committee and in establishing the Elementary Teachers' Federation of Ontario's Humanity Fund, which provides financial support to various charities doing work in developing countries, such as the Stephen Lewis Foundation. He took a leave of absence from his position with the OCETF in 2006 to run in that year's federal election.

In 2002, Dewar organized a Community Forum on Public Education. He has also been actively involved with the Coalition for a Healthy Ottawa, the Partnership for a Pesticide Bylaw, the Old Ottawa East Community Association, and Fair Vote Canada, and he has served on the board of directors of the Ottawa Community Immigrant Services Organization.

Dewar was raised in a Catholic household, but he took issue with the church's positions on same-sex marriage, birth control, and women's rights. He became active with the First United Church from 2001 onward.

On February 14, 2018, Dewar underwent surgery for a brain tumour. He was subsequently diagnosed with grade 4 glioblastoma. Dewar died from his illness on February 6, 2019.

== Politics ==
=== Ottawa Centre nomination races ===
Dewar ran for the New Democratic nomination in Ottawa Centre for the 2004 federal election. Several weeks after Dewar started his campaign, former NDP leader Ed Broadbent came out of retirement to also seek the nomination. After Broadbent won, Dewar went on to volunteer for Broadbent's successful campaign in the general election, playing a major role in organizing the NDP election day effort.

In order to care for his ailing wife, Broadbent decided not to seek re-election. Dewar won the proceeding nomination contest on June 22, 2005, on the first ballot, defeating NDP caucus Research and Communications Director Jamey Heath, who was the riding's candidate in the 1997 election, lawyer and film producer Tiffani Murray, and Ottawa Citizen automotive columnist Shannon Lee Mannion.

=== Member of Parliament ===
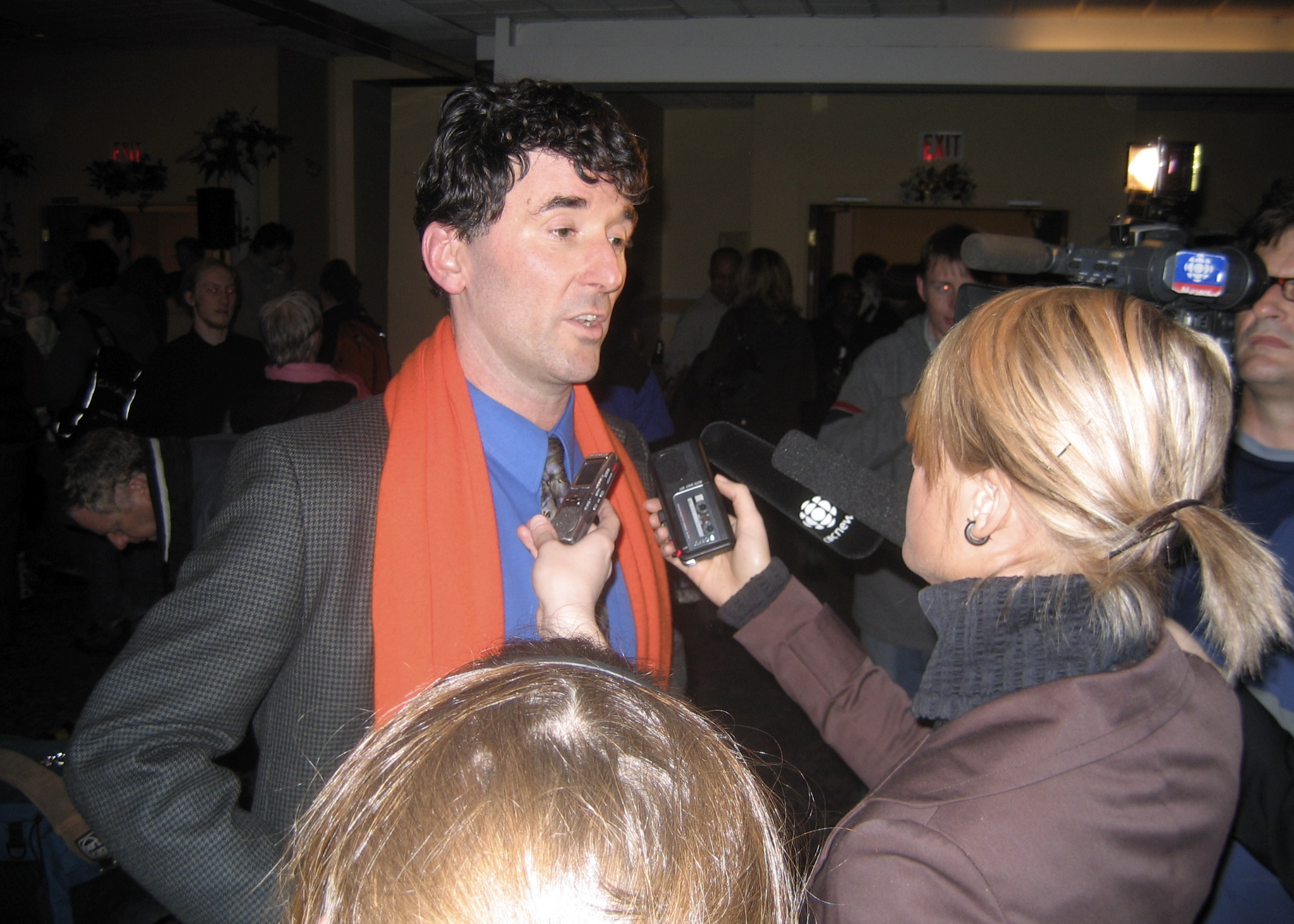
Dewar speaking at his 2006 election victory party

Dewar won the 2006 election and became an MP.

Dewar was acclaimed on February 12, 2007, as the New Democrats' candidate for the 2008 federal election. He was re-elected on October 14, 2008, by a substantial margin over his closest challenger, Penny Collenette of the Liberal Party.

Beginning February 5, 2009, Dewar served as the Chair of the All-Party Parliamentary Group for the Prevention of Genocide and Other Crimes Against Humanity.

In April 2009, Dewar reintroduced legislation to protect Gatineau Park. If passed the act would have provided legislated boundaries for the park, prevented removal of land from the park, created a mechanism for expanding the park, and mandated the National Capital Commission to acquire private lands in the park through a right of first refusal process. However, he was later criticized in the media for having abandoned his commitments on the park, for supporting the Conservative government's legislation, and for not attending the committee studying that legislation.

Dewar was re-elected in the 2011 federal election, winning 52% of the popular vote. The NDP formed the Official Opposition following the election and Dewar was named the Critic for Foreign Affairs. While acting as foreign affairs critic, Dewar took a position in favour of the UN Arms Trade Treaty not exempting weapons designed for sport or hunting, an exemption that the Canadian government was proposing at international talks. Dewar explained in media interviews that in his view it was important that the UN treaty cover all small arms because of the effects that they have had in conflicts in Africa.

Dewar criticized the government's decision to close its embassy in Iran, saying it was "bad diplomacy".

Dewar was one of thirteen Canadians banned from traveling to Russia under retaliatory sanctions imposed by Russian president Vladimir Putin in March 2014.

Dewar was defeated in the 2015 federal election by Liberal candidate Catherine McKenna.

=== Candidacy for NDP leadership ===
Following the death of Jack Layton in August 2011, Dewar was seen as a potential candidate to succeed him as leader. On October 2, 2011, Dewar announced his candidacy for the leadership of the New Democratic Party. Dewar was considered to be among the leading candidates in the seven-person race; however, his lack of fluency in French was seen as a major obstacle. While internal polling released by his campaign showed he was among the top three candidates and had strong growth potential, on election day he finished fifth out of seven candidates on the first ballot with 7.5% of the vote. Following the first ballot, he withdrew his candidacy and did not endorse any other candidates.

== Electoral history ==
2015 Canadian federal election: Ottawa Centre
Party	Candidate	Votes	%	±%	Expenditures
Liberal	Catherine Mary McKenna	32,211	42.7%	+22.48	–
New Democratic	Paul Dewar	29,098	38.5%	−13.66	–
Conservative	Damian Konstantinakos	10,943	14.5%	−7.13	–
Green	Tom Milroy	2,246	3.0%	−2.03	–
Libertarian	Dean T. Harris	551	0.7%	–	–
Rhinoceros	Conrad Lukawski	167	0.2%	–	–
Marijuana	John Andrew Omowole Akpata	160	0.2%	–	–
Communist	Stuart Ryan	124	0.2%	–	–
Total valid votes/Expense limit		75,500	100.0		$230,437.59
Total rejected ballots		386	–	–	
Turnout		75,886	–	–	
Eligible voters		91,625			
Source: Elections Canada

2011 Canadian federal election
Party	Candidate	Votes	%	±%	Expenditures
New Democratic	Paul Dewar	33,704	52.03%	+12.29%	–
Conservative	Damian Konstantinakos	14,076	21.73%	−1.84%	–
Liberal	Scott Bradley	13,036	20.12%	−5.9%	–
Green	Jen Hunter	3,262	5.04%	−4.89%	–
Marijuana	John Andrew Akpata	326	0.5%	–	–
Independent	Romeo Bellai	227	0.35%	–	–
Communist	Stuart Ryan	109	0.17%	–	–
Marxist–Leninist	Pierre Soublière	44	0.07%	–	–
Total valid votes		–	100.00	–	

Source: Elections Canada

2008 Canadian federal election: Ottawa Centre
Party	Candidate	Votes	%	±%	Expenditures
New Democratic	Paul Dewar	25,399	39.74	+2.81	$74,532
Liberal	Penny Collenette	16,633	26.02	−3.18	$85,082
Conservative	Brian McGarry	15,065	23.57	+0.87	$85,487
Green	Jen Hunter	6,348	9.93	−0.22	$41,577
Marijuana	John Akpata	378	0.59	+0.01	none listed
Marxist–Leninist	Pierre Soublière	95	0.15	+0.05	none listed
Total valid votes/expenditure limit		63,918	100.00	–	$91,849
Total rejected ballots		266	0.41		
Turnout		64,184	69.11		
Electors on the lists		92,877			
New Democratic hold		Swing		+3.0	

2006 Canadian federal election
Party	Candidate	Votes	%	±%
New Democratic	"Paul Dewar	24,611	36.93	−4.2"
Liberal	Richard Mahoney	19,458	29.2	−1.9
Conservative	Keith Fountain	15,126	22.7	+3.7
Green	David Chernushenko	6,766	10.15	+2.7
Marijuana	John Akpata	386	0.58	−0.1
Independent	Anwar Syed	121	0.18	
Communist	Stuart Ryan	102	0.15	+0.1
Marxist–Leninist	Christian Legeais	68	0.10	0.0

Ottawa Centre New Democratic Party Nomination Contest, 2006
Candidate	Residence	June 22, 2005
Tiffani Murray	Ottawa	
Jamey Heath	Ottawa	
Paul Dewar	Ottawa	X
Shannon Lee Mannion	Ottawa	

Ottawa Centre New Democratic Party Nomination Contest, 2004
Candidate	Residence	January 20, 2004
Ed Broadbent	Ottawa	X
Paul Dewar	Ottawa	

Preceded by Judy Wasylycia-Leis	Vice-Chair of the Standing Joint; Committee on Scrutiny of Regulations (House of Commons); May 11, 2006 – September 14, 2007; Served alongside: Ken Epp	Succeeded by David Christopherson
