= Penny Collenette =

Canadian lawyer, professor, and politician

Penny Dorothy Collenette CM OOnt (born May 20, 1950, in Oakville, Ontario) is a Canadian lawyer, adjunct professor and political figure of the Liberal Party of Canada.

== Biography ==
The wife of former Liberal Member of Parliament and cabinet minister David Collenette,

She was vice-chair of the human rights committee for Liberal International in 1987, and director of volunteers for Jean Chrétien’s leadership race in 1984 and campaign director in the successful 1990 bid, as well as national director and director of legal services for the Liberal Party of Canada in the 1993 election. She was subsequently named Director of Appointments for the Prime Minister's office, making hundreds of appointments over four years on the job. she sought, and won, the 2008 Liberal nomination over community activist and businessman Scott Bradley for the riding of Ottawa Centre, which was held by Paul Dewar of the New Democratic Party. She came in second to Dewar in the election.

In 2013, Collenette was admitted to the Order of Ontario for her work in ethics and human rights.

She was made a Member of the Order of Canada on December 31, 2025.
