= Jamie Heath (cricketer) =

Australian cricketer (born 1977)

Personal information
- Born: 25 April 1977 (age 49); Belmont, New South Wales, Australia
- Source: ESPNcricinfo, 31 December 2016

Jamie Heath (born 25 April 1977) is an Australian cricketer. He played six first-class matches for New South Wales between 1999/00 and 2001/02.

== See also ==
- List of New South Wales representative cricketers
