= Robert de Cotret =

Canadian politician

The Honourable Robert de Cotret PC

Member of Parliament for Berthier-Montcalm
- In office November 28, 1988 – October 25, 1993
- Preceded by: District established
- Succeeded by: Michel Bellehumeur

Member of Parliament for Berthier—Maskinongé—Lanaudière
- In office September 4, 1984 – November 28, 1988
- Preceded by: Antonio Yanakis
- Succeeded by: District abolished (see Berthier—Montcalm, Champlain and Saint-Maurice from 1987 to 2003)

Canadian Senator from Ontario
- In office June 5, 1979 – January 14, 1980
- Appointed by: Joe Clark

Member of Parliament for Ottawa Centre
- In office October 16, 1978 – May 22, 1979
- Preceded by: Hugh Poulin
- Succeeded by: John Leslie Evans

Secretary of State for Canada
- In office 21 April 1991 – 3 January 1993
- Preceded by: Gerry Weiner
- Succeeded by: Monique Landry

Minister of the Environment
- In office 23 May 1990 – 20 April 1991
- Preceded by: Lucien Bouchard
- Succeeded by: Jean Charest

President of the Treasury Board
- In office 17 September 1984 – 26 August 1987
- Preceded by: Herb Gray
- Succeeded by: Don Mazankowski

Minister of Industry, Trade and Commerce
- In office 4 June 1979 – 2 March 1980
- Preceded by: Jack Horner
- Succeeded by: Herb Gray

Personal details
- Born: Jean Robert René de Cotret; February 20, 1944 Ottawa, Ontario, Canada
- Died: July 9, 1999 (aged 55) Ottawa, Ontario, Canada
- Party: Progressive Conservative

Jean Robert René de Cotret PC (February 20, 1944 – July 9, 1999) was a Canadian economist and politician.

De Cotret was the president and CEO of the Conference Board of Canada from 1976 to 1978 before being elected to the House of Commons of Canada in a 1978 by-election. He was elected as the Progressive Conservative Member of Parliament (MP) for Ottawa Centre, and was one of the few francophone MPs in the Tory caucus.

Despite the Tory victory in the 1979 general election, de Cotret lost his seat. In need of French-Canadian Cabinet ministers, Prime Minister Joe Clark appointed de Cotret to the Senate of Canada and to Cabinet as Minister of Industry, Trade and Commerce in Clark's minority government.

When the government was defeated in a motion of non-confidence, a new election was called for February 18, 1980. De Cotret resigned his Senate seat in order to run for a seat in the House of Commons in the riding of Berthier—Maskinongé, but was defeated in the 1980 election along with the Clark government.

He ran again in the 1984 election, and was elected along with a Progressive Conservative majority government led by Brian Mulroney. Mulroney appointed de Cotret to Cabinet as President of the Treasury Board. In 1987, de Cotret became Minister of Regional Industrial Expansion, and reassumed the Treasury Board portfolio in 1989. In 1990, he became Minister of the Environment and then Secretary of State for Canada in 1991.

De Cotret retired from Cabinet in January 1993 and did not run in the 1993 election.
