= Jean-Luc Pépin =

Canadian politician

The Right Honourable Jean-Luc Pépin PC CC
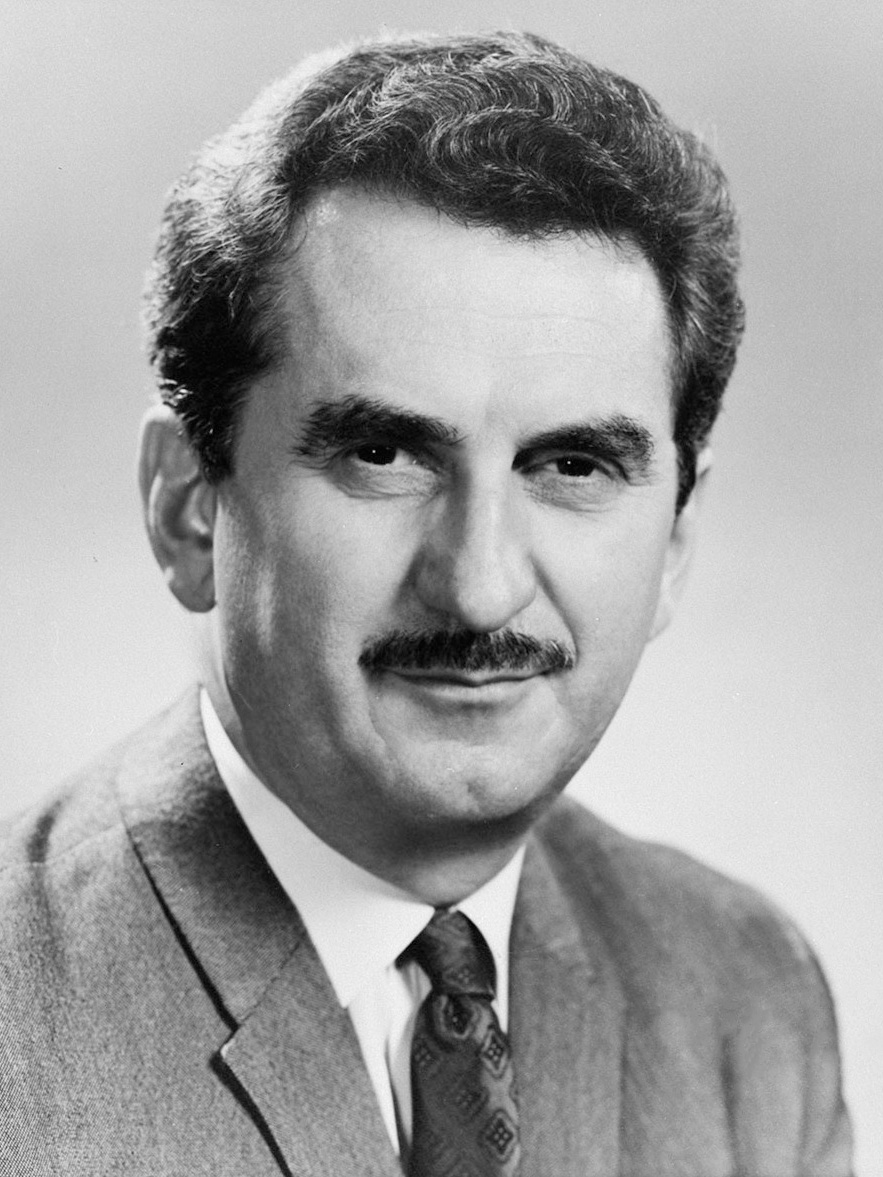
- Pépin, c. 1968

Minister of Transport
- In office 3 March 1980 – 11 August 1983
- Prime Minister: Pierre Trudeau
- Preceded by: Don Mazankowski
- Succeeded by: Lloyd Axworthy

Minister of Industry, Trade and Commerce
- In office 1 April 1969 – 26 November 1972
- Prime Minister: Pierre Trudeau
- Preceded by: Office established
- Succeeded by: Alastair Gillespie

Minister of Trade and Commerce
- In office 6 July 1968 – 31 March 1969
- Prime Minister: Pierre Trudeau
- Preceded by: Charles Drury
- Succeeded by: Office abolished
- Acting; 30 March 1968 – 19 April 1968
- Prime Minister: Lester B. Pearson
- Preceded by: Robert Winters
- Succeeded by: Charles Drury

Minister of Labour
- In office 20 April 1968 – 5 July 1968
- Prime Minister: Pierre Trudeau
- Preceded by: John Robert Nicholson
- Succeeded by: Bryce Mackasey

Minister of Energy, Mines and Resources
- In office 1 October 1966 – 5 July 1968
- Prime Minister: Lester B. Pearson; Pierre Trudeau
- Preceded by: Office established
- Succeeded by: Joe Greene

Minister of Mines and Technical Surveys
- In office 18 December 1965 – 30 September 1966
- Prime Minister: Lester B. Pearson
- Preceded by: John Watson MacNaught
- Succeeded by: Office abolished

Minister without portfolio
- In office 7 July 1965 – 17 December 1965
- Prime Minister: Lester B. Pearson

Member of Parliament for Ottawa—Carleton
- In office 22 May 1979 – 3 September 1984
- Preceded by: Jean Pigott
- Succeeded by: Barry Turner

Member of Parliament for Drummond (Drummond—Arthabaska; 1963–1968)
- In office 8 April 1963 – 29 October 1972
- Preceded by: David Ouellet
- Succeeded by: Jean-Marie Boisvert

Personal details
- Born: 1 November 1924 Drummondville, Quebec, Canada
- Died: 5 September 1995 (aged 70) Ottawa, Ontario, Canada
- Party: Liberal
- Spouse: Sheila-Mary Brock-Smith (m. 1952–1995)
- Children: 2
- Education: University of Ottawa
- Profession: Professor; political commentator

Jean-Luc Pépin PC CC (French: [pepɛ̃]; November 15, 1924 – September 5, 1995) was a Canadian academic, politician and Cabinet minister.

== Political biography ==
Pépin was a political science professor at the University of Ottawa when he was first elected to the House of Commons of Canada in the 1963 election as a Liberal Member of Parliament (MP) from Quebec.

From 1965 to 1972, he served in the cabinets of Prime Ministers Lester B. Pearson and Pierre Trudeau in various capacities, including Minister of Mines and Minister of Industry, Trade and Commerce overseeing the decision to have Canada adopt the metric system.

He lost his seat in the 1972 election, and retired from public life until 1975 when Trudeau appointed him to chair the Anti-Inflation Board.

In 1977, he and former Premier of Ontario John Robarts were appointed to head the "Task Force on Canadian Unity". This task force was created by the federal government as a response to the election of the Parti Québécois, which seeks political independence for Quebec in the 1976 provincial election.

The task force issued a report in 1979 that recommended entrenching language rights in the Canadian Constitution, and for the reduction of federal powers in all areas but economic management. The Task Force also recommended the replacement of the Senate of Canada with a "Council of the Federation" whose members would be appointed by provincial governments, and to grant the provinces a say in appointments to the Supreme Court of Canada. Most of these recommendations were rejected by the Government of Canada, and did not make their way into the new Constitution that was enacted in 1982.

After a seven-year absence, Pépin returned to the House of Commons in the 1979 election. When the Liberals returned to power after the 1980 election, he became Minister of Transport until 12 August 1983. In that position he was responsible for

- the drastic 1981 passenger rail service cuts (from which Canadian passenger rail never recovered);
- abolition of the Crowsnest Pass rates;
- the National Ports Policy, enunciated in the Harbour Commissions Act.

Later, he became a Minister of State to the Department of External Affairs and Minister responsible for La Francophonie.

== Later life ==
Following heart surgery, he retired from politics in 1984 and returned to academia as a fellow at the University of Ottawa's Institute on Public Policy.

In 1977, he was made a Companion of the Order of Canada. He was bestowed the title The Right Honourable in 1992.

== Electoral history ==
1963 Canadian federal election: Drummond—Arthabaska
Party	Candidate	Votes
Liberal	Jean-Luc Pépin	17,338
Social Credit	David Ouellet	14,739
Progressive Conservative	J.-Claude Couture	3,416
New Democratic	Pierre Lambert	1,456

1965 Canadian federal election: Drummond—Arthabaska
Party	Candidate	Votes
Liberal	Jean-Luc Pépin	15,179
Ralliement créditiste	André Fortin	8,518
Progressive Conservative	Pierre Jutras	7,413
Independent	Sam Boulanger	6,068
New Democratic	Charles-Émile Riendeau	1,660

1968 Canadian federal election
Party	Candidate	Votes	%
Liberal	Jean-Luc Pépin	11,667	38.5
Ralliement créditiste	Claude Proulx	9,545	31.5
Progressive Conservative	André Biron	8,342	27.6
New Democratic	Pierre Gagné	723	2.4
Total valid votes		30,277	100.0

1972 Canadian federal election
Party	Candidate	Votes	%	±%
Social Credit	Jean-Marie Boisvert	15,923	42.2	+10.7
Liberal	Jean-Luc Pépin	15,853	42.0	+3.5
Progressive Conservative	Roger Rousseau	5,351	14.2	-13.4
New Democratic	Ann Dewitt	590	1.6	-0.8
Total valid votes		37,717	100.0	

1979 Canadian federal election
Party	Candidate	Votes	%	±%
Liberal	Jean-Luc Pépin	33,972		
Progressive Conservative	Jean Pigott	26,972		
New Democratic	Jill Vickers	8,234		

1980 Canadian federal election
Party	Candidate	Votes	%	±%
Liberal	Jean-Luc Pépin	34,960		
Progressive Conservative	Bert Lawrence	22,384		
New Democratic	Don Francis	7,788		
Independent	Oli Cosgrove	235		

Note: Social Credit vote is compared to Ralliement créditiste vote in the 1968 election.

== Bibliography ==
- Pépin, Jean-Luc, 1924–. National ports policy = Politique portuaire nationale / Jean-Luc Pépin. – [Ottawa] : Minister of Transport = Ministre des transports, 1981.

== Archives ==
There is a Jean-Luc Pépin fonds at Library and Archives Canada.
