= Bob Plamondon =

Canadian writer and consultant

- Born: December 8, 1957 (age 68); Cornwall, Ontario, Canada
- Education: Masters of Management Studies
- Alma mater: Carleton University
- Occupations: Writer; consultant
- Children: 4
- Writing career
- Language: English, French
- Genre: Non-fiction
- Subjects: Canadian history and politics
- Notable awards: Queen's Diamond Jubilee Medal, FCPA
- Website: www.bobplamondon.com

Bob Plamondon (born December 8, 1957) is a Canadian consultant, independent board member, economist, and writer. He has authored numerous public policy studies, op-eds, and books, which have been excerpted in Maclean's magazine and various Canadian newspapers and reviewed in Quill & Quire, Literary Review of Canada, The Globe and Mail, and The Washington Times. His 2013 book, The Truth About Trudeau, stayed on Amazon's Top 100 books for 47 consecutive days.

== Life and career ==
Plamondon earned a Masters of Management Studies and B. Comm. (Honours) from Carleton University. In 1983, he became a member of the Canadian Institute of Chartered Accountants and was elected Fellow (FCPA) in 2003. In 2018, he completed the Rotman-ICD Directors Education Program.

In 1988, he ran for Federal Parliament as a Progressive Conservative.

In 2012, he was awarded the Queen Elizabeth II Diamond Jubilee Medal. Also in 2012, he led a campaign that resulted in the renaming of the Ottawa River Parkway to the Sir John A. Macdonald Parkway, now renamed to the Kichi Zibi Mikan.

In 2014, Plamondon was appointed by the Government of Canada to the board of directors of the National Capital Commission, where he served as chair of the audit committee and on the executive committee. In 2017, he was elected by the NCC Board of Directors to serve as interim chair. His term on the NCC board concluded in June 2018.

In 2018, Plamondon launched an initiative to establish the Wellington National Mall in the Parliamentary Precinct of Ottawa.

In 2019, he was appointed by the Government of Ontario to the board of directors of OPTrust, where he sits on the Governance and Audit committees. OPTrust holds about $22 billion in assets, which funds the pension plan for about 100,000 members of OPSEU and its retirees.

The same year, Plamondon conceived and launched The Prime Ministers Series—a partnership of the University of Ottawa and the Canada School of Public Service. Delivering Transformative Change for Canadians with the Rt. Hon. Brian Mulroney was held in Ottawa on March 5, 2019, in front of over 500 aspiring and senior public servants. Former prime minister Jean Chretien was featured on March 3, 2020, and was interviewed by Plamondon.

In October 2020, on the occasion of the fiftieth anniversary of the October Crisis, Plamondon was a featured speaker in a BBC radio documentary hosted by noted historian Margaret MacMillan.

In 2021, Plamondon was appointed by the Senate of Canada to serve on its Standing Committee on Audit and Oversight.

Plamondon currently sits on the advisory board of the Digital Academy of the Canada School of Public Service as well as the boards of the National Portrait Gallery, Ottawa Business Events, and the Ottawa chapter of the Sir Winston Churchill Society. Other community contributions include serving on the board of directors of the Sierra Club of Canada, committees of the Ottawa Chamber of Commerce, and the YMCA.

Following an audit of the Ottawa-Carleton District School Board on June 27, 2025, the Ontario Minister of Education, Paul Calandra, appointed Plamondon as supervisor of the deficit-stricken school board.

== Books ==
- Hay West: A Story of Canadians Helping Canadians (Red Deer Press, 2004)
- Full Circle: Death and Resurrection in Canadian Conservative Politics (Key Porter, 2006))
- Blue Thunder: The Truth About Conservatives from Macdonald to Harper (Key Porter, 2009)
- The Truth About Trudeau ( Great River Media Inc, 2013 )
- The Shawinigan Fox: How Jean Chrétien Defied the Elites and Reshaped Canada (Great River Media, 2017)
- O Canada! A Celebration of 150 Years (Great River Media, 2017 – chapter contribution)
