= Jean Pigott =

Canadian politician (1924–2012)

Jean Elizabeth Morrison Pigott OC

Member of Parliament for Ottawa—Carleton
- In office 1976–1979
- Preceded by: John Turner
- Succeeded by: Jean-Luc Pépin

Personal details
- Born: May 20, 1924 Ottawa, Ontario, Canada
- Died: January 10, 2012 (aged 87) Ottawa, Ontario, Canada
- Party: Progressive Conservative
- Spouse: Arthur Pigott
- Children: 3
- Profession: Business executive

Jean Elizabeth Morrison Pigott (May 20, 1924 – January 10, 2012) was a Canadian politician and businesswoman. She served as the member of Parliament (MP) for the riding of Ottawa—Carleton from 1976 to 1979 as a member of the Progressive Conservative Party of Canada. She later served as chair of the National Capital Commission (NCC) from 1985 to 1992.

== Early life and career ==
Pigott was born in Ottawa on May 20, 1924, the eldest of three children born to Cecil Morrison and Margaret Cotter. The daughter of Ottawa businessman George Morrison, Pigott's family has lived in the Ottawa Valley for four generations. She attended Ottawa Ladies' College and studied at Belleville's Albert College for a year, before joining the office staff at her family's business, Morrison Lamothe Bakery. In 1948, she hired Arthur Pigott, an accountant, to serve as her assistant manager. The two married in 1955 and Pigott left her job at the bakery. They had three children between 1957 and 1963.

By the 1960s, Morrison Lamothe had expanded into 30 shops and restaurants and a 1,000-employee workforce, but it was struggling financially due to a bread price war and the opening of a new, $5 million plant in Ottawa's east end. In 1966, Pigott rejoined the company and became its president and CEO. She closed the new factory, returning operations to their abandoned factory which was scheduled to be demolished, laid off 600 staff, sold off several subsidiaries, and persuaded creditors to freeze the company's overdue accounts. Within a year, the company turned its first profit in five years and expanded into frozen foods.

In 1972, Pigott became the first woman to sit on the board of directors of Ontario Hydro. In 1973, she joined Ontario Premier Bill Davis as part of a trade delegation to the United Kingdom.

== Member of Parliament ==
Pigott entered politics in 1976 after John Turner resigned, leaving his Ottawa—Carleton seat vacant. She won the Progressive Conservative (PC) nomination for the ensuing by-election, beating out former Ontario cabinet minister Bert Lawrence. She won the by-election and became a member of Parliament in the House of Commons of Canada. Pigott was one of only two women in the party's 96-member caucus, alongside Flora MacDonald. PC leader Joe Clark appointed her critic for housing and issues related to the National Capital Region.

In the 1979 federal election, she lost her seat to Liberal Party candidate Jean-Luc Pépin even though the Progressive Conservative Party made enough gains elsewhere in the country to form a minority government. The new prime minister, Joe Clark, hired Pigott as an advisor. In the 1980 federal election, she was the PC candidate in Ottawa Centre, where she placed second to Liberal candidate John Evans. She did not run in the 1984 federal election, though she actively campaigned for several Ottawa-area PC candidates.

== Post-political career ==
After her defeat, Pigott set up a communications consulting firm and returned to Morrison Lamothe as chairman of the board.

Following the Progressive Conservative Party's return to power under Brian Mulroney in the 1984 federal election, Pigott was appointed by Mulroney as chair of the National Capital Commission (NCC). She served the role from 1985 to 1992. Her tenure saw the introduction of user fees on parking at Gatineau Park and cross-country ski trails to offset budget cuts to the NCC.

In 1993, Ontario Premier Bob Rae appointed Pigott chair of the board of the Ottawa Congress Centre.

== Later life and death ==
Pigott received heart surgery during the 1970s and recovered from two strokes during her late seventies. She died on January 10, 2012, at Grace Manor in Ottawa, the same building where she was born.

== Awards and recognition ==
In 1967, Pigott was awarded the Governor General's Centennial Medal.

In 1979, Pigott became the first female member of the Rideau Club in its 114-year history.

In 1995, Pigott was made an Officer of the Order of Canada for having "shown leadership and determination in ensuring the use of resources for positive growth and change at all levels of government".

In 2004, Pigott was awarded the Key to the City by the City of Ottawa. Jean Pigott Hall at Ottawa City Hall is named for her.

== Archives ==
There is a Jean Pigott fonds at Library and Archives Canada. Archival reference number is R12715.
