= Jamey Heath =

21st-century Canadian political activist

Jamey Heath is a political activist in Ontario, Canada. He was the research and communications director for the New Democratic Party under Jack Layton until shortly after the 2006 federal election. Previously, he was a senior campaign worker in Jack Layton's successful campaign to win the party's leadership in 2003.

Heath had earlier been communications director for Greenpeace, and was the NDP's candidate for Ottawa Centre in the 1997 federal election, placing second to the Liberal Party's Mac Harb. He has been a weekly columnist for the Ottawa Sun and Capital Xtra!.

Heath graduated from Carleton University with a Bachelor of Journalism degree. While at Carleton, he was involved in student politics; most notably getting disqualified from a Carleton University Students' Association election. He also served as co-chair of the Ontario New Democratic Youth in the early 1990s.

Following Ed Broadbent's announcement that he would not be running in the next federal election, Heath contested the NDP's nomination to succeed him in Ottawa Centre but was defeated at the June 22, 2005, nomination meeting by Paul Dewar.

In February 2007 his book was published, Dead Centre: Hope, Possibility, and Unity for Canadian Progressives.
