= John Leslie Evans =

Canadian politician

John Leslie Evans (born 12 July 1941) was a Liberal Party member of the House of Commons of Canada. He was a professor and economist by career.

Born in Seattle, Washington, United States, he represented the Ottawa Centre electoral district in the city of Ottawa, Ontario which he first won in the 1979 federal election. He was re-elected there in 1980, but defeated in the 1984 election. Evans left federal politics after serving in the 31st and 32nd Canadian Parliaments.
