= By-elections to the 30th Canadian Parliament =

By-elections to the 30th Canadian Parliament were held to fill vacancies in the House of Commons of Canada between the 1974 federal election and the 1979 federal election. The Liberal Party of Canada led a majority government for the entirety of the 30th Canadian Parliament, though their number did decrease from by-elections.

27 seats became vacant during the life of the Parliament. 25 of these vacancies were filled through by-elections, and 2 seats remained vacant when the 1979 federal election was called.

By-election	Date	Incumbent	Party	Winner	Party	Cause	Retained
Burnaby—Richmond—Delta	October 16, 1978	John Reynolds	Progressive Conservative	Tom Siddon	Progressive Conservative	Resignation	Yes
St. Boniface	October 16, 1978	Joseph-Philippe Guay	Liberal	Jack Hare	Progressive Conservative	Resignation	No
Fundy—Royal	October 16, 1978	Gordon Fairweather	Progressive Conservative	Robert Corbett	Progressive Conservative	Resignation	Yes
Humber—St. George's—St. Barbe	October 16, 1978	Jack Marshall	Progressive Conservative	Fonse Faour	New Democratic	Resignation	No
Halifax—East Hants	October 16, 1978	Bob McCleave	Progressive Conservative	Howard Edward Crosby	Progressive Conservative	Resignation	Yes
Broadview	October 16, 1978	John Gilbert	New Democratic	Bob Rae	New Democratic	Resignation	Yes
Eglinton	October 16, 1978	Mitchell Sharp	Liberal	Rob Parker	Progressive Conservative	Resignation	No
Hamilton—Wentworth	October 16, 1978	Sean O'Sullivan	Progressive Conservative	Geoff Scott	Progressive Conservative	Resignation	Yes
Ottawa Centre	October 16, 1978	Hugh Poulin	Liberal	Robert de Cotret	Progressive Conservative	Resignation	No
Parkdale	October 16, 1978	Stan Haidasz	Liberal	Yuri Shymko	Progressive Conservative	Resignation	No
Rosedale	October 16, 1978	Donald S. Macdonald	Liberal	David Crombie	Progressive Conservative	Resignation	No
York—Scarborough	October 16, 1978	Robert Stanbury	Liberal	W. Paul McCrossan	Progressive Conservative	Resignation	No
Lotbinière	October 16, 1978	André Fortin	Social Credit	Richard Janelle	Social Credit	Death	Yes
Saint-Hyacinthe	October 16, 1978	Claude Wagner	Progressive Conservative	Marcel Ostiguy	Liberal	Resignation	No
Westmount	October 16, 1978	Bud Drury	Liberal	Don Johnston	Liberal	Resignation	Yes
Malpeque	May 24, 1977	J. Angus MacLean	Progressive Conservative	Donald Wood	Liberal	Resignation	No
Langelier	May 24, 1977	Jean Marchand	Liberal	Gilles Lamontagne	Liberal	Resignation	Yes
Louis-Hébert	May 24, 1977	Albanie Morin	Liberal	Dennis Dawson	Liberal	Death	Yes
Témiscamingue	May 24, 1977	Réal Caouette	Social Credit	Gilles Caouette	Social Credit	Death	Yes
Terrebonne	May 24, 1977	Joseph-Roland Comtois	Liberal	Joseph-Roland Comtois	Liberal	Resignation	Yes
Verdun	May 24, 1977	Bryce Mackasey	Liberal	Raymond Savard	Liberal	Resignation	Yes
St. John's West	October 18, 1976	Walter Carter	Progressive Conservative	John C. Crosbie	Progressive Conservative	Resignation	Yes
Ottawa—Carleton	October 18, 1976	John Turner	Liberal	Jean Pigott	Progressive Conservative	Resignation	No
Restigouche	October 14, 1975	Jean-Eudes Dubé	Liberal	Maurice Harquail	Liberal	Resignation	Yes
Hochelaga	October 14, 1975	Gérard Pelletier	Liberal	Jacques Lavoie	Progressive Conservative	Resignation	No

== See also ==
- List of federal by-elections in Canada

== Sources ==
- Parliament of Canada–Elected in By-Elections
