= 30th Canadian Parliament =

1974–1979 term of the parliament of Canada

- Majority parliament
- Sep. 30, 1974 – Mar. 26, 1979
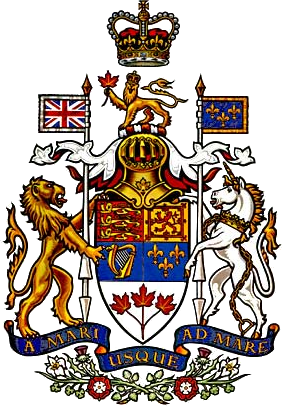

Parliament leaders
- Prime minister: Rt. Hon. Pierre Trudeau; Apr. 20, 1968 – Jun. 4, 1979
- Cabinet: 20th Canadian Ministry
- Leader of the Opposition: Hon. Robert Stanfield; November 6, 1967 – November 21, 1976
- Hon. Joe Clark; November 20, 1976 – June 3, 1979

Party caucuses
- Government: Liberal Party
- Opposition: Progressive Conservative Party
- Recognized: New Democratic Party
- Unrecognized: Social Credit Party

House of Commons
- Seating arrangements of the House of Commons
- Speaker of the Commons: Hon. James Jerome; September 30, 1974 – February 17, 1980
- Government House leader: Hon. Mitchell Sharp; August 8, 1974 – September 13, 1976
- Hon. Allan MacEachen; September 14, 1976 – March 26, 1979
- Opposition House leader: Hon. Ged Baldwin; August 14, 1974 – February 24, 1976
- Hon. Walter Baker; February 25, 1976 – March 26, 1979
- Members: 264 MP seats List of members

Senate
- Seating arrangements of the Senate
- Speaker of the Senate: Hon. Renaude Lapointe; September 12, 1974 – October 4, 1979
- Government Senate leader: Hon. Ray Perrault; August 8, 1974 – June 3, 1979
- Opposition Senate leader: Hon. Jacques Flynn; October 31, 1967 – May 22, 1979
- Senators: 102 (until 1975); 104 (from 1975) senator seats List of senators

Sovereign
- Monarch: Elizabeth II; 6 February 1952 – 8 September 2022
- Governor general: Jules Léger; 14 January 1974 – 22 January 1979
- Edward Schreyer; 22 January 1979 – 14 May 1984

Sessions
- 1st session September 30, 1974 – October 12, 1976
- 2nd session October 12, 1976 – October 17, 1977
- 3rd session October 18, 1977 – October 10, 1978
- 4th session October 11, 1978 – March 26, 1979
← 29th	→ 31st

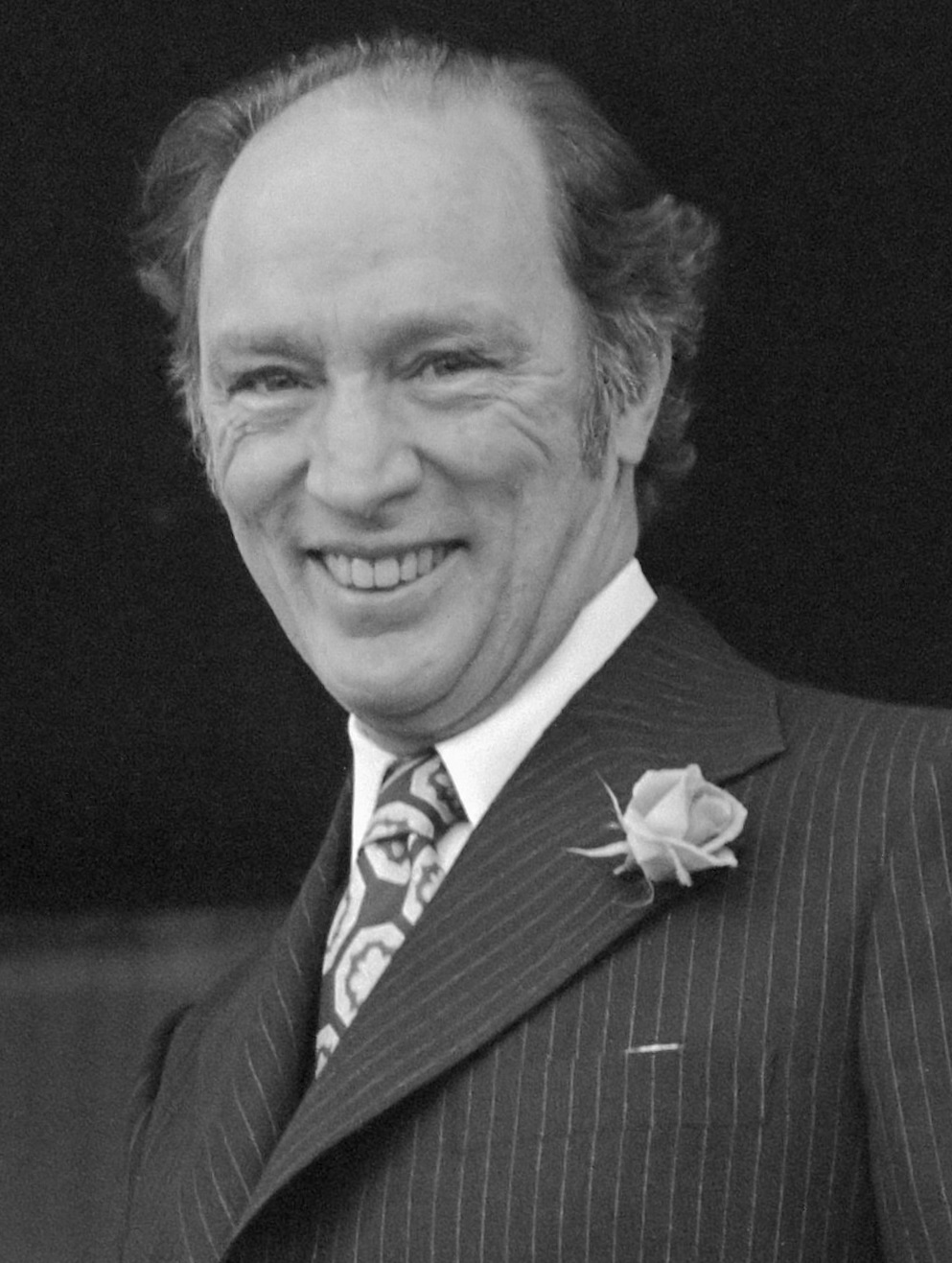
Pierre Trudeau, in 1975, who was Prime Minister during the 30th Canadian Parliament.

The 30th Canadian Parliament was in session from September 30, 1974, until March 26, 1979. The membership was set by the 1974 election on July 8, 1974, and was only changed somewhat due to resignations and by-elections before it was dissolved prior to the 1979 election.

There were four sessions of the 30th Parliament:

Session	Start	End
1st	September 30, 1974	October 12, 1976
2nd	October 12, 1976	October 17, 1977
3rd	October 18, 1977	October 10, 1978
4th	October 11, 1978	March 26, 1979

== Overview ==
It was controlled by a Liberal Party majority led by Prime Minister Pierre Trudeau and the 20th Canadian Ministry. The Official Opposition was the Progressive Conservative Party, led first by Robert Stanfield, and then by Joe Clark.

The sessions were prorogued (reason unknown currently).

Queen Elizabeth II opened the 3rd session during her Silver Jubilee visit to Canada.

== Party standings ==
The party standings as of the election and as of dissolution were as follows:

Affiliation	House members		Senate members	
Affiliation	1974 election results	At dissolution	On election day 1974	At dissolution
Liberal	141	133	76	73
Progressive Conservative	95	98	18	18
New Democratic	16	17	0	0
Social Credit	11	9	1	1
Independent	1	5	2	2
Independent Liberal	0	0	1	1
Total members	264	263	98	92
Vacant	0	2	4	9
Total seats	264		102	104

== Major events ==
=== Criminal law reform ===
The 30th Canadian Parliament saw changes to a number of elements of Canadian criminal law. These changes were made through the Criminal Law Amendment Act, 1975, Criminal Law Amendment Act (No. 2), 1976, Criminal Law Amendment Act, 1977.

==== Death penalty ====
Since 1966, legislation temporarily suspending the death penalty for all crimes except the murder of a police officer or prison guard had been in place. In 1976, a contentious debate on the future of death penalty was held in the House of Commons. The Criminal Law Amendment Act (No. 2), 1976, permanently banning the death penalty, passed in the House on July 14, 1976 by a vote of 131 in favour to 124 against and received royal assent on July 26, 1976. This legislation did not override the death penalty clauses in the National Defence Act, which allowed application of capital punishment in cases of cowardice, desertion, unlawful surrender, or spying. These clauses were removed in 1998 under the government of Jean Chrétien.

=== Canada joins the G7 ===
The G6, a meeting of the worlds dominant economic powers, had been conceived of and executed by French president Valéry Giscard d’Estaing in 1975. Canada was not invited as d’Estaing did not believe the country's economy was powerful enough to be relevant. The meeting was originally intended as a one time event, but in 1976 American president Gerald Ford initiated a second meeting of the group. Due to the alignment between Canadian and American interests, Ford insisted that Canada be allowed to join the group, and the G6 became the G7.

=== 1976 Canadian general strike ===
In 1975, the Trudeau government passed the Anti-Inflation Act which implemented statutory wage and price controls. One year later, on October 14, 1976, the Canadian Labour Congress initiated a one day general strike in which one million Canadian workers refused to work. This remains the largest workers strike in Canadian history.

=== Publicly owned energy: Petro-Canada ===
In 1973, the OAPEC oil crisis sent oil prices skyrocketing across the western world. Though this benefited Alberta's oil sector, it generated massive inflation and economic chaos for the country as a whole.

In an attempt to work toward energy independence, Petro-Canada, a government-owned oil company was created in 1975.

== Ministry ==
The 20th Canadian Ministry began near the end of the 27th Canadian Parliament and governed throughout the 28th Canadian Parliament, 29th Canadian Parliament, and 30th Canadian Parliament.

== Officeholders ==
=== Head of State ===
Office	Photo	Name	Assumed office	Left office
Sovereign		Elizabeth II	February 6, 1952	September 8, 2022
Governor General		Jules Léger	January 14, 1974	January 22, 1979
Governor General		Edward Schreyer	January 22, 1979	May 14,1984

=== Party leadership ===
Party	Photo	Name	Assumed Office	Left Office
Liberal		Pierre Trudeau	April 6, 1968	June 16, 1984
Progressive Conservative		Robert Stanfield	November 6, 1967	November 21, 1976
Progressive Conservative		Joe Clark	November 20, 1976	June 3, 1979
New Democratic		David Lewis	April 24, 1971	July 6, 1975
New Democratic		Ed Broadbent	July 7, 1975	December 5, 1989
Social Credit		Réal Caouette	1971	1976
Social Credit		André-Gilles Fortin	1976	June 24, 1977
Social Credit		Gilles Caouette (interim)	1977	1978
Social Credit		Lorne Reznowski	1978	1978
Social Credit		Charles-Arthur Gauthier (interim)	1978	1978

=== House of Commons ===
==== Presiding officer ====
Office	Photo	Officer	Riding	From	To	Party
Speaker of the House of Commons		James Jerome	Sudbury	September 30, 1974	February 17, 1980	Progressive Conservative

==== Government leadership (Liberal) ====
Office	Photo	Officer	Riding	From	To
Prime Minister		Pierre Trudeau	Mount Royal	April 20, 1968	June 4, 1979
Prime Minister		Pierre Trudeau	Mount Royal	March 3, 1980	June 30, 1984
House Leader		Mitchell Sharp	Eglinton	August 8, 1974	September 13, 1976
House Leader		Allan MacEachen	Cape Breton Highlands—Canso	September 14, 1976	March 26, 1979
Whip		Thomas Lefebvre	Pontiac	December 1972	October 1975
Whip		Joseph-Philippe Guay	St. Boniface	October 1975	1977
Whip		Gus MacFarlane	Hamilton Mountain	1979	1979

== Changes to Party Standings ==
=== By-elections ===
By-election	Date	Incumbent	Party	Winner	Party	Cause	Retained
Burnaby—Richmond—Delta	October 16, 1978	John Reynolds	Progressive Conservative	Tom Siddon	Progressive Conservative	Resignation	Yes
St. Boniface	October 16, 1978	Joseph-Philippe Guay	Liberal	Jack Hare	Progressive Conservative	Resignation	No
Fundy—Royal	October 16, 1978	Gordon Fairweather	Progressive Conservative	Robert Corbett	Progressive Conservative	Resignation	Yes
Humber—St. George's—St. Barbe	October 16, 1978	Jack Marshall	Progressive Conservative	Fonse Faour	New Democratic	Resignation	No
Halifax—East Hants	October 16, 1978	Bob McCleave	Progressive Conservative	Howard Edward Crosby	Progressive Conservative	Resignation	Yes
Broadview	October 16, 1978	John Gilbert	New Democratic	Bob Rae	New Democratic	Resignation	Yes
Eglinton	October 16, 1978	Mitchell Sharp	Liberal	Rob Parker	Progressive Conservative	Resignation	No
Hamilton—Wentworth	October 16, 1978	Sean O'Sullivan	Progressive Conservative	Geoff Scott	Progressive Conservative	Resignation	Yes
Ottawa Centre	October 16, 1978	Hugh Poulin	Liberal	Robert de Cotret	Progressive Conservative	Resignation	No
Parkdale	October 16, 1978	Stan Haidasz	Liberal	Yuri Shymko	Progressive Conservative	Resignation	No
Rosedale	October 16, 1978	Donald S. Macdonald	Liberal	David Crombie	Progressive Conservative	Resignation	No
York—Scarborough	October 16, 1978	Robert Stanbury	Liberal	W. Paul McCrossan	Progressive Conservative	Resignation	No
Lotbinière	October 16, 1978	André Fortin	Social Credit	Richard Janelle	Social Credit	Death	Yes
Saint-Hyacinthe	October 16, 1978	Claude Wagner	Progressive Conservative	Marcel Ostiguy	Liberal	Resignation	No
Westmount	October 16, 1978	Bud Drury	Liberal	Don Johnston	Liberal	Resignation	Yes
Malpeque	May 24, 1977	J. Angus MacLean	Progressive Conservative	Donald Wood	Liberal	Resignation	No
Langelier	May 24, 1977	Jean Marchand	Liberal	Gilles Lamontagne	Liberal	Resignation	Yes
Louis-Hébert	May 24, 1977	Albanie Morin	Liberal	Dennis Dawson	Liberal	Death	Yes
Témiscamingue	May 24, 1977	Réal Caouette	Social Credit	Gilles Caouette	Social Credit	Death	Yes
Terrebonne	May 24, 1977	Joseph-Roland Comtois	Liberal	Joseph-Roland Comtois	Liberal	Resignation	Yes
Verdun	May 24, 1977	Bryce Mackasey	Liberal	Raymond Savard	Liberal	Resignation	Yes
St. John's West	October 18, 1976	Walter Carter	Progressive Conservative	John C. Crosbie	Progressive Conservative	Resignation	Yes
Ottawa—Carleton	October 18, 1976	John Turner	Liberal	Jean Pigott	Progressive Conservative	Resignation	No
Restigouche	October 14, 1975	Jean-Eudes Dubé	Liberal	Maurice Harquail	Liberal	Resignation	Yes
Hochelaga	October 14, 1975	Gérard Pelletier	Liberal	Jacques Lavoie	Progressive Conservative	Resignation	No

== Parliamentarians ==
=== House of Commons ===
Members of the House of Commons in the 30th parliament arranged by province.

Key:

- Party leaders are italicized.
- Parliamentary secretaries is indicated by "‡".
- Cabinet ministers are in **boldface**.
- The Prime Minister is **both**.
- The Speaker is indicated by "(†)".

==== Alberta ====
Riding	Member	Political party	First elected / previously elected	No. of terms
Athabasca	Paul Yewchuk	Progressive Conservative	1968	3rd term
Battle River	Arnold Malone	Progressive Conservative	1974	1st term
Calgary Centre	Harvie Andre	Progressive Conservative	1972	2nd term
Calgary North	Eldon Woolliams	Progressive Conservative	1958	7th term
Calgary South	Peter Bawden	Progressive Conservative	1972	2nd term
Crowfoot	**Jack Horner***	Progressive Conservative	1958	7th term
Crowfoot	**Jack Horner***	Liberal	1958	7th term
Edmonton Centre	Steve Paproski	Progressive Conservative	1968	3rd term
Edmonton East	William Skoreyko	Progressive Conservative	1958	7th term
Edmonton West	Marcel Lambert	Progressive Conservative	1957	8th term
Edmonton—Strathcona	Douglas Roche	Progressive Conservative	1972	2nd term
Lethbridge	Kenneth Earl Hurlburt	Progressive Conservative	1972	2nd term
Medicine Hat	Bert Hargrave	Progressive Conservative	1972	2nd term
Palliser	Stanley Schumacher**	Progressive Conservative	1968	3rd term
Palliser	Stanley Schumacher**	Independent	1968	3rd term
Peace River	Ged Baldwin	Progressive Conservative	1958	7th term
Pembina	Peter Elzinga	Progressive Conservative	1974	1st term
Red Deer	Gordon Towers	Progressive Conservative	1972	2nd term
Rocky Mountain	Joe Clark	Progressive Conservative	1972	2nd term
Vegreville	Don Mazankowski	Progressive Conservative	1968	3rd term
Wetaskiwin	Kenneth Schellenberger	Progressive Conservative	1972	2nd term

* Jack Horner crossed the floor to join the Liberal Party on April 20, 1977
** Stanley Schumacher left Progressive Conservative and sat as an independent MP on February 28, 1978

==== British Columbia ====
Riding	Member	Political party	First elected / previously elected	No. of terms
Burnaby—Richmond—Delta	John Reynolds	Progressive Conservative	1972	2nd term
Burnaby—Richmond—Delta	Tom Siddon (1978)*	Progressive Conservative	1978	1st term
Burnaby—Seymour	Marke Raines	Liberal	1974	1st term
Capilano	Ron Huntington	Progressive Conservative	1974	1st term
Coast Chilcotin	Jack Pearsall ‡	Liberal	1974	1st term
Comox—Alberni	Hugh Anderson ‡	Liberal	1974	1st term
Esquimalt—Saanich	Donald Munro	Progressive Conservative	1972	2nd term
Fraser Valley East	Alexander Patterson	Progressive Conservative	1953, (Note: First elected as a Social Credit) 1962, (Note: Re-elected as a Social Credit) 1972	7th term*
Fraser Valley West	Robert Wenman	Progressive Conservative	1974	1st term
Kamloops—Cariboo	**Leonard Marchand** ‡	Liberal	1968	3rd term
Kootenay West	Robert Brisco	Progressive Conservative	1974	1st term
Nanaimo—Cowichan—The Islands	Tommy Douglas	New Democrat	1935, (Note: Weyburn (Saskatchewan)) 1962, (Note: Burnaby—Coquitlam) 1969	8th term*
New Westminster	Stuart Leggatt	New Democrat	1972	2nd term
Okanagan Boundary	George Whittaker	Progressive Conservative	1972	2nd term
Okanagan—Kootenay	Howard Johnston	Progressive Conservative	1965, 1974	2nd term*
Prince George—Peace River	Frank Oberle Sr.	Progressive Conservative	1972	2nd term
Skeena	**Iona Campagnolo** ‡	Liberal	1974	1st term
Surrey—White Rock	Benno Friesen	Progressive Conservative	1974	1st term
Vancouver Centre	**Ron Basford**	Liberal	1963	5th term
Vancouver East	Art Lee ‡	Liberal	1974	1st term
Vancouver Kingsway	Simma Holt	Liberal	1974	1st term
Vancouver Quadra	Bill Clarke	Progressive Conservative	1972	2nd term
Vancouver South	John Allen Fraser	Progressive Conservative	1972	2nd term
Victoria	Allan McKinnon	Progressive Conservative	1972	2nd term

* John Reynolds left parliament and was replaced by Tom Siddon in an October 16, 1978 by-election

==== Manitoba ====
Riding	Member	Political party	First elected / previously elected	No. of terms
Brandon—Souris	Walter Dinsdale	Progressive Conservative	1951	10th term
Churchill	Cecil Smith	Progressive Conservative	1974	1st term
Dauphin	Gordon Ritchie	Progressive Conservative	1968	3rd term
Lisgar	Jack Murta	Progressive Conservative	1970	3rd term
Marquette	Craig Stewart	Progressive Conservative	1968	3rd term
Portage	Peter Masniuk	Progressive Conservative	1972	2nd term
Provencher	Jake Epp	Progressive Conservative	1972	2nd term
Selkirk	Dean Whiteway	Progressive Conservative	1974	1st term
St. Boniface	**Joseph-Philippe Guay** ‡ *	Liberal	1968	3rd term
St. Boniface	Jack Hare (1978)	Progressive Conservative	1978	1st term
Winnipeg North	David Orlikow	New Democrat	1962	6th term
Winnipeg North Centre	Stanley Knowles	New Democrat	1942, 1962	11th term*
Winnipeg South	**James Richardson****	Liberal	1968	3rd term
Winnipeg South	**James Richardson****	Independent	1968	3rd term
Winnipeg South Centre	Dan McKenzie	Progressive Conservative	1972	2nd term

* Joseph-Philippe Guay left parliament and was replaced by Jack Hare in an October 16, 1978, by-election.
** James Richardson left the Liberals by crossing the floor to sit as an independent MP on June 27, 1978.

==== New Brunswick ====
Riding	Member	Political party	First elected / previously elected	No. of terms
Carleton—Charlotte	Fred McCain	Progressive Conservative	1972	2nd term
Fundy—Royal	Robert Fairweather	Progressive Conservative	1962	6th term
Fundy—Royal	Robert Corbett (1978)*	Progressive Conservative	1978	1st term
Gloucester	Herb Breau ‡	Liberal	1968	3rd term
Madawaska—Victoria	Eymard Corbin	Liberal	1968	3rd term
Moncton	Leonard C. Jones	Independent	1974	1st term
Northumberland—Miramichi	Maurice Dionne ‡	Liberal	1974	1st term
Restigouche	Jean-Eudes Dubé	Liberal	1962	6th term
Restigouche	Maurice Harquail (1975)** ‡	Liberal	1975	1st term
Saint John—Lancaster	Mike Landers ‡	Liberal	1974	1st term
Westmorland—Kent	**Roméo LeBlanc**	Liberal	1972	2nd term
York—Sunbury	J. Robert Howie	Progressive Conservative	1972	2nd term

* Robert Fairweather resigned to become Canada's first Human Rights Commissioner and was replaced by Robert Corbett in an October 16, 1978 by-election
** Jean-Eudes Dubé resigned and was replaced by Maurice Harquail in an October 14, 1975 by-election

==== Newfoundland ====
Riding	Member	Political party	First elected / previously elected	No. of terms
Bonavista—Trinity—Conception	Dave Rooney	Liberal	1972	2nd term
Burin—Burgeo	**Donald Jamieson**	Liberal	1966	4th term
Gander—Twillingate	George Baker ‡	Liberal	1974	1st term
Grand Falls—White Bay—Labrador	Bill Rompkey ‡	Liberal	1972	2nd term
Humber—St. George's—St. Barbe	Jack Marshall	Progressive Conservative	1968	3rd term
Humber—St. George's—St. Barbe	Fonse Faour (1978)*	NDP	1978	1st term
St. John's East	James McGrath	Progressive Conservative	1957, 1968	6th term*
St. John's West	Walter Carter	Progressive Conservative	1968	3rd term
St. John's West	John Crosbie (1976)**	Progressive Conservative	1976	1st term

* Jack Marshall left parliament and was replaced by Fonse Faour in an October 16, 1978, by-election
** Walter Carter resigned to re-enter provincial election and was replaced by John Crosbie in an October 18, 1976 by-election

==== Nova Scotia ====
Riding	Member	Political party	First elected / previously elected	No. of terms
Annapolis Valley	Pat Nowlan	Progressive Conservative	1965	4th term
Cape Breton Highlands—Canso	**Allan MacEachen**	Liberal	1953, 1962	8th term*
Cape Breton—East Richmond	Andrew Hogan	New Democrat	1974	1st term
Cape Breton—The Sydneys	Robert Muir	Progressive Conservative	1957	8th term
Central Nova	Elmer MacKay	Progressive Conservative	1971	3rd term
Cumberland—Colchester North	Robert Coates	Progressive Conservative	1957	8th term
Dartmouth—Halifax East	Michael Forrestall	Progressive Conservative	1965	4th term
Halifax	Robert Stanfield	Progressive Conservative	1967	4th term
Halifax—East Hants	Robert McCleave	Progressive Conservative	1957, 1965	7th term*
Halifax—East Hants	Howard Crosby (1978)*	Progressive Conservative	1978	1st term
South Shore	Lloyd Crouse	Progressive Conservative	1957	8th term
South Western Nova	Coline Campbell ‡	Liberal	1974	1st term

* Robert McCleave resigned to become a judge and was replaced by Howard Crosby in an October 16, 1978 by-election

==== Ontario ====
Riding	Member	Political party	First elected / previously elected	No. of terms
Algoma	Maurice Foster ‡	Liberal	1968	3rd term
Brant	Derek Blackburn	New Democrat	1971	3rd term
Broadview	John Gilbert	New Democrat	1965	4th term
Broadview	Bob Rae (1978)*	New Democrat	1978	1st term
Bruce	Crawford Douglas ‡	Liberal	1974	1st term
Cochrane	Ralph Stewart	Liberal	1968	3rd term
Cochrane	Ralph Stewart	Progressive Conservative	1968	3rd term
Davenport	Charles Caccia	Liberal	1968	3rd term
Don Valley	James Gillies	Progressive Conservative	1972	2nd term
Eglinton	**Mitchell Sharp**	Liberal	1963	5th term
Eglinton	Rob Parker (1978)**	Progressive Conservative	1978	1st term
Elgin	John Wise	Progressive Conservative	1972	2nd term
Essex—Windsor	**Eugene Whelan**	Liberal	1962	6th term
Etobicoke	**Alastair Gillespie**	Liberal	1968	3rd term
Fort William	Paul McRae ‡	Liberal	1972	2nd term
Frontenac—Lennox and Addington	Douglas Alkenbrack	Progressive Conservative	1962	6th term
Glengarry—Prescott—Russell	Denis Éthier	Liberal	1972	2nd term
Greenwood	Andrew Brewin	New Democrat	1962	6th term
Grenville—Carleton	Walter Baker	Progressive Conservative	1972	2nd term
Grey—Simcoe	Gus Mitges	Progressive Conservative	1972	2nd term
Halton	Frank Philbrook	Liberal	1974	1st term
Halton—Wentworth	Bill Kempling	Progressive Conservative	1972	2nd term
Hamilton East	**John Munro**	Liberal	1962	6th term
Hamilton Mountain	Gus MacFarlane ‡	Liberal	1974	1st term
Hamilton—Wentworth	Sean O'Sullivan	Progressive Conservative	1972	2nd term
Hamilton—Wentworth	Geoffrey Scott (1978)***	Progressive Conservative	1978	1st term
Hamilton West	Lincoln Alexander	Progressive Conservative	1968	3rd term
Hastings	Jack Ellis	Progressive Conservative	1972	2nd term
High Park—Humber Valley	Otto Jelinek	Progressive Conservative	1972	2nd term
Huron—Middlesex	Robert McKinley	Progressive Conservative	1965	4th term
Kenora—Rainy River	**John Mercer Reid** ‡	Liberal	1965	4th term
Kent—Essex	Robert Daudlin ‡	Liberal	1974	1st term
Kingston and the Islands	Flora MacDonald	Progressive Conservative	1972	2nd term
Kitchener	Patrick Flynn	Liberal	1974	1st term
Lambton—Kent	John Holmes	Progressive Conservative	1972	2nd term
Lanark—Renfrew—Carleton	Paul Dick	Progressive Conservative	1972	2nd term
Leeds	Thomas Cossitt	Progressive Conservative	1972	2nd term
Lincoln	William Andres ‡	Liberal	1974	1st term
London East	Charles Turner ‡	Liberal	1968	3rd term
London West	**Judd Buchanan**	Liberal	1968	3rd term
Middlesex—London—Lambton	Larry Condon	Liberal	1974	1st term
Mississauga	**Anthony Abbott**	Liberal	1974	1st term
Niagara Falls	Roger Young ‡	Liberal	1974	1st term
Nickel Belt	John Rodriguez	New Democrat	1972	2nd term
Nipissing	**Jean-Jacques Blais** ‡	Liberal	1972	2nd term
Norfolk—Haldimand	William David Knowles	Progressive Conservative	1968	3rd term
Northumberland—Durham	Allan Lawrence	Progressive Conservative	1972	2nd term
Ontario	**Norman Cafik** ‡	Liberal	1968	3rd term
Oshawa—Whitby	Ed Broadbent	New Democrat	1968	3rd term
Ottawa—Carleton	**John Turner**	Liberal	1962	6th term
Ottawa—Carleton	Jean Pigott (1976)†	Progressive Conservative	1976	1st term
Ottawa Centre	Hugh Poulin ‡	Liberal	1972	2nd term
Ottawa Centre	Robert de Cotret (1978)††	Progressive Conservative	1978	1st term
Ottawa East	Jean-Robert Gauthier ‡	Liberal	1972	2nd term
Ottawa West	Cyril Lloyd Francis ‡	Liberal	1963, (Note: Carleton) 1968, 1974	3rd term*
Oxford	Bruce Halliday	Progressive Conservative	1974	1st term
Parkdale	Stanley Haidasz	Liberal	1957, (Note: Trinity) 1962	7th term*
Parkdale	Yuri Shymko (1978)†††	Progressive Conservative	1978	1st term
Parry Sound-Muskoka	Stan Darling	Progressive Conservative	1972	2nd term
Peel—Dufferin—Simcoe	Ross Milne ‡	Liberal	1974	1st term
Perth—Wilmot	William Jarvis	Progressive Conservative	1972	2nd term
Peterborough	**Hugh Faulkner**	Liberal	1965	4th term
Port Arthur	**Bob Andras**	Liberal	1965	4th term
Prince Edward—Hastings	George Hees	Progressive Conservative	1950, (Note: Broadview) 1965	9th term*
Renfrew North—Nipissing East	Len Hopkins ‡	Liberal	1965	4th term
Rosedale	**Donald Stovel Macdonald**	Liberal	1962	6th term
Rosedale	David Crombie (1978)‡	Progressive Conservative	1978	1st term
Sarnia—Lambton	**Bud Cullen** ‡	Liberal	1968	3rd term
Sault Ste. Marie	Cyril Symes	New Democrat	1972	2nd term
Scarborough East	**Martin O'Connell**	Liberal	1968, 1974	2nd term*
Scarborough West	Alan Gray Martin ‡	Liberal	1974	1st term
Simcoe North	Philip Rynard	Progressive Conservative	1957	8th term
Spadina	Peter Stollery	Liberal	1972	2nd term
St. Catharines	Gilbert Parent ‡	Liberal	1974	1st term
St. Paul's	**John Roberts**	Liberal	1968, (Note: York—Simcoe) 1974	2nd term*
Stormont—Dundas	Ed Lumley ‡	Liberal	1974	1st term
Sudbury	James Jerome (†)	Liberal	1968	3rd term
Thunder Bay	Keith Penner ‡	Liberal	1968	3rd term
Timiskaming	Arnold Peters	New Democrat	1957	8th term
Timmins	Jean Roy	Liberal	1968	3rd term
Toronto-Lakeshore	Ken Robinson ‡	Liberal	1968, 1974	2nd term*
Trinity	Aideen Nicholson ‡	Liberal	1974	1st term
Victoria—Haliburton	William C. Scott	Progressive Conservative	1965	4th term
Waterloo—Cambridge	Max Saltsman	New Democrat	1964	5th term
Welland	Victor Railton ‡	Liberal	1972	2nd term
Wellington	Frank Maine ‡	Liberal	1974	1st term
Wellington—Grey—Dufferin—Waterloo	Perrin Beatty	Progressive Conservative	1972	2nd term
Windsor West	Herb Gray	Liberal	1962	6th term
Windsor—Walkerville	Mark MacGuigan ‡	Liberal	1968	3rd term
York Centre	Bob Kaplan ‡	Liberal	1968, (Note: Don Valley) 1974	2nd term*
York East	David Collenette ‡	Liberal	1974	1st term
York North	**Barney Danson**	Liberal	1968	3rd term
York—Scarborough	Robert Stanbury	Liberal	1965	4th term
York—Scarborough	Paul McCrossan (1978)‡‡	Progressive Conservative	1978	1st term
York—Simcoe	Sinclair Stevens	Progressive Conservative	1972	2nd term
York South	Ursula Appolloni	Liberal	1974	1st term
York West	James Fleming ‡	Liberal	1972	2nd term

* John Gilbert resigned from parliament in April 1978 to become a judge and was replaced by Bob Rae in an October 16, 1978, by-election.
** Mitchell Sharp retired from politics and was replaced by Rob Parker in an October 16, 1978, by-election.
*** Sean O'Sullivan left parliament to become a priest and was replaced by Geoffrey Scott in an October 16, 1978, by-election.
† John Turner quit parliament in protest of the government's decision to implement wage and price controls he was replaced by Jean Pigott in an October 18, 1976, by-election.
†† Hugh Poulin left parliament in April 1978 to become a judge and was replaced by Robert de Cotret in an October 16, 1978, by-election.
††† Stanley Haidasz left parliament to be appointed to the Senate he was replaced by Yuri Shymko in an October 16, 1978, by-election.
‡ Donald Stovel Macdonald left parliament and was replaced by David Crombie in an October 16, 1978, by-election.
‡‡ Robert Stanbury left parliament and was replaced by William Paul McCrossan in an October 16, 1978, by-election.

==== Prince Edward Island ====
Riding	Member	Political party	First elected / previously elected	No. of terms
Cardigan	**Daniel J. MacDonald**	Liberal	1972	2nd term
Egmont	David MacDonald	Progressive Conservative	1965	4th term
Hillsborough	Heath MacQuarrie	Progressive Conservative	1957	8th term
Malpeque	Angus MacLean	Progressive Conservative	1951	10th term
Malpeque	Donald Wood (1977)*	Liberal	1977	1st term

* Angus MacLean resigned to enter provincial politics and was replaced by Donald Wood in a May 24, 1977 by-election

==== Quebec ====
Riding	Member	Political party	First elected / previously elected	No. of terms
Abitibi	Gérard Laprise	Social Credit	1962	6th term
Ahuntsic	**Jeanne Sauvé**	Liberal	1972	2nd term
Argenteuil—Deux Montagnes	**Francis Fox** ‡	Liberal	1972	2nd term
Beauce	Yves Caron ‡	Liberal	1972	2nd term
Beauharnois—Salaberry	Gérald Laniel	Liberal	1962	6th term
Bellechasse	Adrien Lambert	Social Credit	1968	3rd term
Berthier	Antonio Yanakis	Liberal	1965	4th term
Brome—Missisquoi	Heward Grafftey	Progressive Conservative	1958, 1972	6th term*
Bonaventure—Îles-de-la-Madeleine	Albert Béchard	Liberal	1962	6th term
Montreal—Bourassa	Jacques Trudel ‡	Liberal	1968	3rd term
Chambly	Bernard Loiselle ‡	Liberal	1974	1st term
Champlain	René Matte*	Social Credit	1968	3rd term
Champlain	René Matte*	Independent	1968	3rd term
Charlevoix	Charles Lapointe ‡	Liberal	1974	1st term
Chicoutimi	Paul Langlois	Liberal	1965	4th term
Compton	Claude Tessier	Liberal	1974	1st term
Dollard	**Jean-Pierre Goyer**	Liberal	1965	4th term
Drummond	Yvon Pinard ‡	Liberal	1974	1st term
Duvernay	Yves Demers ‡	Liberal	1972	2nd term
Frontenac	Léopold Corriveau ‡	Liberal	1970	3rd term
Gamelin	Arthur Portelance ‡	Liberal	1968	3rd term
Gaspé	Alexandre Cyr ‡	Liberal	1963, 1968	4th term*
Gatineau	Gaston Clermont ‡	Liberal	1960, (Note: Labelle) 1965	6th term*
Hochelaga	**Gérard Pelletier**	Liberal	1965	4th term
Hochelaga	Jacques Lavoie (1975)*	Progressive Conservative	1975	1st term
Hochelaga	Jacques Lavoie (1975)*	Liberal	1975	1st term
Hull	Gaston Isabelle	Liberal	1965	4th term
Joliette	Roch La Salle	Progressive Conservative	1968	3rd term
Kamouraska	Charles-Eugène Dionne	Social Credit	1962	6th term
Labelle	Maurice Dupras ‡	Liberal	1970	3rd term
Lac-Saint-Jean	**Marcel Lessard**	Liberal	1962, 1968	5th term*
Lachine—Lakeshore	Roderick Blaker ‡	Liberal	1972	2nd term
Lafontaine	Claude-André Lachance ‡	Liberal	1974	1st term
Langelier	**Jean Marchand**	Liberal	1965	4th term
Langelier	**Gilles Lamontagne** (1977)** ‡	Liberal	1977	1st term
Lapointe	Gilles Marceau ‡	Liberal	1968	3rd term
La Prairie	Ian Watson	Liberal	1963	5th term
Lasalle—Émard—Côte Saint-Paul	John Campbell	Liberal	1972	2nd term
Laurier	Fernand Leblanc ‡	Liberal	1964	5th term
Laval	Marcel-Claude Roy ‡	Liberal	1968	3rd term
Lévis	Raynald Guay ‡	Liberal	1963	5th term
Longueuil	Jacques Olivier ‡	Liberal	1972	2nd term
Lotbiniere	André-Gilles Fortin	Social Credit	1968	3rd term
Lotbiniere	Richard Janelle (1978)***	Social Credit	1978	1st term
Louis-Hébert	Albanie Morin	Liberal	1972	2nd term
Louis-Hébert	Dennis Dawson (1977)† ‡	Liberal	1977	1st term
Maissonneuve—Rosemont	Serge Joyal	Liberal	1974	1st term
Manicouagan	Gustave Blouin ‡	Liberal	1963	5th term
Matane	**Pierre de Bané** ‡	Liberal	1968	3rd term
Mercier	Prosper Boulanger	Liberal	1962	6th term
Montmorency	Louis Duclos ‡	Liberal	1974	1st term
Mount Royal	**Pierre Trudeau**	Liberal	1965	4th term
Notre-Dame-de-Grâce	**Warren Allmand**	Liberal	1965	4th term
Outremont	**Marc Lalonde**	Liberal	1972	2nd term
Papineau	**André Ouellet**	Liberal	1967	4th term
Pontiac	Thomas Lefebvre ‡	Liberal	1965	4th term
Portneuf	Pierre Bussières ‡	Liberal	1974	1st term
Québec-Est	Gérard Duquet	Liberal	1965	4th term
Richelieu	Florian Côté	Liberal	1966	4th term
Richmond	Léonel Beaudoin	Social Credit	1968	3rd term
Rivière-du-Loup—Témiscouata	Rosaire Gendron	Liberal	1963	5th term
Rimouski	Eudore Allard	Social Credit	1972	2nd term
Roberval	Charles-Arthur Gauthier	Social Credit	1962	6th term
Saint-Denis	Marcel Prud'homme	Liberal	1964	5th term
Saint-Henri	Gérard Loiselle	Liberal	1957	8th term
Saint-Hyacinthe	Claude Wagner	Progressive Conservative	1972	2nd term
Saint-Hyacinthe	Marcel Ostiguy (1978)††	Liberal	1978	1st term
Saint-Jacques	Jacques Guilbault ‡	Liberal	1968	3rd term
Saint-Jean	Walter Smith ‡	Liberal	1968	3rd term
Saint-Maurice	**Jean Chrétien**	Liberal	1963	5th term
Saint-Michel	**Monique Bégin** ‡	Liberal	1972	2nd term
Sainte-Marie	Raymond Dupont ‡	Liberal	1972	2nd term
Shefford	Gilbert Rondeau†††	Social Credit	1962, 1968	5th term*
Shefford	Gilbert Rondeau†††	Independent	1962, 1968	5th term*
Shefford	Gilbert Rondeau†††	Social Credit	1962, 1968	5th term*
Shefford	Gilbert Rondeau†††	Independent	1962, 1968	5th term*
Sherbrooke	Irénée Pelletier ‡	Liberal	1972	2nd term
Témiscamingue	Réal Caouette	Social Credit	1946, (Note: Pontiac) 1962	7th term*
Témiscamingue	Gilles Caouette (1977)†††	Social Credit	1972, (Note: Charlevoix) 1977	2nd term*
Terrebonne	Joseph-Roland Comtois	Liberal	1965	4th term
Trois-Rivières Métropolitain	Claude Lajoie ‡	Liberal	1971	3rd term
Vaudreuil	Hal Herbert ‡	Liberal	1972	2nd term
Verdun	**Bryce Mackasey**	Liberal	1962	6th term
Verdun	Pierre Savard (1977)‡	Liberal	1977	1st term
Villeneuve	Armand Caouette	Social Credit	1974	1st term
Westmount	**Charles (Bud) Drury**	Liberal	1962	6th term
Westmount	Donald Johnston (1978)‡‡	Liberal	1978	1st term

* René Matte expelled from the Social Credit Party on April 11, 1978 and sat as an independent MP.
** Gérard Pelletier left parliament to become ambassador to France he was replaced by Jacques Lavoie on October 14, 1975, after a by-election. On June 14, 1977 Lavoie quit the PC party and crossed the floor to join the Liberals.
*** Jean Marchand left parliament and was replaced by J. Gilles Lamontagne in a May 25, 1977, by-election
**** André-Gilles Fortin was killed in a car accident and was replaced by Richard Janelle in an October 16, 1978, by-election.
† Albanie Morin died in office and was replaced by Dennis Dawson in a May 25, 1977, by-election.
†† Claude Wagner left parliament to accept a seat in the Senate and was replaced by Marcel Ostiguy in an October 16, 1978, by-election.
††† Gilbert Rondeau was ejected from the Social Credit Party and sat as an independent MP from August 16 to October 12, 1977. He returned to the Social Credit caucus on that date but was expelled from that caucus on November 16, 1977 and sat again as an independent MP.
†††† Réal Caouette died in office and was replaced by his son Gilles Caouette in a May 24, 1977, by-election
‡ Bryce Mackasey resigned from parliament and was replaced by Pierre Savard in a May 24, 1977, by-election
‡‡ Bud Drury resigned and was replaced by Donald Johnston in an October 16, 1977, by-election.

==== Saskatchewan ====
Riding	Member	Political party	First elected / previously elected	No. of terms
Assiniboia	Ralph Goodale ‡	Liberal	1974	1st term
Battleford—Kindersley	Cliff McIsaac ‡	Liberal	1974	1st term
Mackenzie	Stanley Korchinski	Progressive Conservative	1958	7th term
Meadow Lake	Bert Cadieu	Progressive Conservative	1958, 1974	6th term*
Moose Jaw	Douglas Neil	Progressive Conservative	1972	2nd term
Prince Albert	John Diefenbaker	Progressive Conservative	1940	12th term
Qu'Appelle—Moose Mountain	Alvin Hamilton	Progressive Conservative	1957, (Note: Qu'Appelle) 1972	7th term*
Regina East	James Balfour	Progressive Conservative	1972	2nd term
Regina—Lake Centre	Les Benjamin	New Democrat	1968	3rd term
Saskatoon—Biggar	Ray Hnatyshyn	Progressive Conservative	1974	1st term
Saskatoon—Humboldt	**Otto Lang**	Liberal	1968	3rd term
Swift Current—Maple Creek	Frank Hamilton	Progressive Conservative	1972	2nd term
Yorkton—Melville	Lorne Nystrom	New Democrat	1968	3rd term

==== Territories ====
Riding	Member	Political party	First elected / previously elected	No. of terms
Northwest Territories	Wally Firth	New Democrat	1972	2nd term
Yukon	Erik Nielsen	Progressive Conservative	1957	8th term

== Committees ==
=== House ===
==== Standing ====
- Standing Committee on Agriculture
- Standing Committee on Broadcasting, Films and Assistance to the Arts
- Standing Committee on External Affairs and National Defence
  - Sub-Committee on International Development
- Standing Committee on Finance, Trade and Economic Affairs
- Standing Committee on Fisheries and Forestry
- Standing Committee on Health, Welfare and Social Affairs
- Standing Committee on Indian Affairs and Northern Development
- Standing Committee on Justice and Legal Affairs
  - Sub-Committee on the Penitentiary System in Canada
- Standing Committee on Labour, Manpower and Immigration
- Standing Committee on Management and Members' Services
- Standing Committee on Miscellaneous Estimates
- Standing Committee on Miscellaneous Private Bills and Standing Orders
- Standing Committee on National Resources and Public Works
- Standing Committee on Privileges and Elections
- Standing Committee on Procedure and Organization
- Standing Committee on Public Accounts
- Standing Committee on Regional Development
- Standing Committee on Transport and Communications
- Standing Committee on Veterans Affairs
- Standing Committee on Northern Pipelines

==== Special ====
- Special Committee on Egg Marketing
- Special Committee on Rights and Immunities of Members
- Special Committee on TV and Radio Broadcasting of Proceedings of the House and its Committees
- Special Committee on a Northern Gas Pipeline

=== Senate ===
==== Standing ====
- Standing Committee on Agriculture
- Standing Committee on Banking, Trade and Commerce
- Standing Committee on Foreign Affairs
- Standing Committee on Health, Welfare and Science
  - Subcommittee on Childhood Experiences as Causes of Criminal Behaviour
- Standing Committee on Legal and Constitutional Affairs
  - Subcommittee on Off-Track Betting
- Standing Committee on National Finance
- Standing Committee on Transport and Communications

==== Special ====
- Special Committee on the Clerestory of the Senate Chamber
- Special Committee on Science Policy
- Special Committee on the Constitution
- Special Committee on a Northern Gas Pipeline / Northern Pipeline
- Special Committee on Retirement Age Policies

=== Joint ===
==== Standing Joint Committees ====
- Standing Joint Committee on Regulations and other Statutory Instruments

==== Special Joint Committees ====
- Special Joint Committee on Employer-Employee Relations in the Public Service
- Special Joint Committee on Immigration Policy
- Special Joint Committee on the National Capital Region
- Special Joint Committee on the Constitution of Canada

== Legislation and motions ==
=== Act's which received royal assent under 30th Parliament ===
==== 1st Session ====
===== Public acts =====
Date of Assent	Index	Title	Bill Number
October 10, 1974	1	West Coast Grain Handling Operations Act, 1974	C-12
October 30, 1974	2	Appropriation Act No. 3, 1974	C-31
November 27, 1974	3	Army Benevolent Fund Act, An Act to amend the	C-17
November 27, 1974	4	Canada Pension Plan, An Act to amend the	C-22
November 27, 1974	5	Customs Act, An Act to amend the	S-4
November 27, 1974	6	Customs Tariff, An Act to amend the	C-27
November 27, 1974	7	Federal trust companies and loan companies to increase the monetary limit of their borrowing power and to issue subordinated notes, An Act to authorize	S-7
November 27, 1974	8	Statute Law (Veterans and Civilian War Allowances) Amendment Act, 1974	C-4
December 13, 1974	9	Immigration Act, An Act to amend the	S-12
December 13, 1974	10	Electoral Boundaries Readjustment Act, An Act to amend the	C-214
December 13, 1974	11	Alberta-British Columbia Boundary Act, 1974	S-13
December 13, 1974	12	Fire Losses Replacement Account Act, An Act to amend the	C-18
December 20, 1974	13	Representation Act, 1974	C-36
December 20, 1974	14	Federal Business Development Bank Act	C-14
December 20, 1974	15	Indian Oil and Gas Act	C-15
December 20, 1974	16	Office of the Secretary to the Cabinet for Federal-Provincial Relations and respecting the Clerk of the Privy Council, An Act respecting the	C-38
December 20, 1974	17	Export Development Act, An Act to amend the	C-9
December 20, 1974	18	Supreme Court Act and to make related amendments to the Federal Court Act, An Act to amend the	S-2
December 20, 1974	19	Court of Queen's Bench of the Province of Quebec, An Act to revise references to the	S-16
December 20, 1974	20	Statute Revision Act	S-3
December 20, 1974	21	Appropriation Act No. 4, 1974	C-42
December 20, 1974	22	Appropriation Act No. 5, 1974	C-45
February 27, 1975	23	Customs Tariff (No. 2), An Act to amend the	C-39
February 27, 1975	24	Excise Tax Act and the Excise Act, An Act to amend the	C-40
February 27, 1975	25	Electoral Boundaries Readjustment Act, An Act to amend the	C-370
March 13, 1975	26	Statute law relating to income tax, An Act to amend the	C-49
March 13, 1975	27	Canadian Wheat Board Act, An Act to amend the	S-6
March 13, 1975	28	Northwest Territories Representation Act	C-51
March 13, 1975	29	Electoral Boundaries Readjustment Act, An Act respecting (Bruce–Grey)	C-228
March 13, 1975	30	Electoral Boundaries Readjustment Act, An Act respecting (Lafontaine–Rosemont)	C-229
March 13, 1975	31	Electoral Boundaries Readjustment Act, An Act respecting (Berthier–Maskinongé)	C-365
March 24, 1975	32	West Coast Ports Operations Act, 1975	C-56
March 24, 1975	33	Canada Business Corporations Act	C-29
March 24, 1975	34	Prairie Grain Advance Payments Act, An Act to amend the	C-10
March 24, 1975	35	Beaver (Castor canadensis) as a symbol of the sovereignty of Canada, An Act to provide for the recognition of the	C-373
March 25, 1975	36	Appropriation Act No. 1, 1975	C-54
March 25, 1975	37	Appropriation Act No. 2, 1975	C-55
March 26, 1975	38	National Housing Act, An Act to amend the	C-46
April 24, 1975	39	St. Lawrence Ports Operations Act, 1975	C-59
April 24, 1975	40	Law Reform Commission Act, An Act to amend the	C-43
April 24, 1975	41	Railway Act, An Act to amend the	C-48
April 24, 1975	42	Civil Service Insurance Act, An Act to amend the	C-26
April 24, 1975	43	Proprietary or Patent Medicine Act and to amend the Trade Marks Act, An Act to repeal the	S-9
May 8, 1975	44	Senate and House of Commons Act, the Salaries Act and the Parliamentary Secretaries Act, An Act to amend the	C-44
May 8, 1975	45	Farm Credit Act, An Act to amend the	C-34
May 8, 1975	46	Fort-Falls Bridge Authority Act, An Act to amend the	C-367
June 19, 1975	47	Petroleum Administration Act	C-32
June 19, 1975	48	Judges Act and certain other Acts for related purposes and in respect of the reconstitution of the Supreme Courts of Newfoundland and Prince Edward Island, An Act to amend the	C-47
June 19, 1975	49	Canadian Radio-television and Telecommunications Commission Act	C-5
June 19, 1975	50	Cultural Property Export and Import Act	C-33
June 19, 1975	51	Northern Canada Power Commission Act, An Act to amend the	C-13
June 19, 1975	52	Territorial Lands Act, An Act to amend the	S-20
June 19, 1975	53	British North America Acts, 1867 to 1975, An Act to amend the	C-3
June 19, 1975	54	Two-Price Wheat Act	C-19
June 19, 1975	55	Ocean Dumping Control Act	C-37
June 19, 1975	56	Salaries Act, An Act to amend the	C-24
June 26, 1975	57	Appropriation Act No. 3, 1975	C-64
June 26, 1975	58	Old Age Security Act, to repeal the Old Age Assistance Act and to amend other Acts in consequence thereof, An Act to amend the	C-62
June 26, 1975	59	Department of Industry, Trade and Commerce Act, An Act to amend the	S-15
June 26, 1975	60	Explosives Act, An Act to amend the	S-17
July 30, 1975	61	Petro-Canada Act	C-8
July 30, 1975	62	Excise Tax Act, An Act to amend the	C-66
July 30, 1975	63	Agricultural Stabilization Act, An Act to amend the	C-50
July 30, 1975	64	Prairie Grain Advance Payments Act, No. 2, An Act to amend the	C-53
July 30, 1975	65	Federal-Provincial Fiscal Arrangements Act, 1972, An Act to amend the	C-57
July 30, 1975	66	Statute Law (Status of Women) Amendment Act, 1974	C-16
July 30, 1975	67	Public Service Staff Relations Act, An Act to amend the	C-70
July 30, 1975	68	Olympie (1976) Act, An Act to amend the	C-63
July 30, 1975	69	Privileges and Immunities (International Organizations) Act, An Act to amend the	S-25
July 30, 1975	70	Customs Tariff, (No. 3), An Act to amend the	C-67
December 2, 1975	71	Statute law relating to income tax, (No. 2), An Act to amend the	C-65
December 2, 1975	72	Environmental Contaminants Act	C-25
December 2, 1975	73	Lieutenant Governors Superannuation Act	C-23
December 15, 1975	74	Appropriation Act No. 4, 197	C-79
December 15, 1975	75	Anti-Inflation Act	C-73
December 15, 1975	76	Combines Investigation Act and the Bank Act and to repeal an Act to amend an Act to amend the Combines Investigation Act and the Criminal Code, An Act to amend the	C-2
December 15, 1975	77	Teleglobe Canada Act	S-27
December 15, 1975	78	King George V Cancer Fund Winding-up Act	C-76
December 30, 1975	79	Supplementary Borrowing Authority Act, 1975	C-80
December 30, 1975	80	Unemployment Insurance Act, 1971, An Act to amend the	C-69
December 30, 1975	81	Statute Law (Superannuation) Amendment Act, 1975	C-52
December 30, 1975	82	National Housing Act and the Central Mortgage and Housing Corporation Act, An Act to amend the	C-77
December 30, 1975	83	Government Annuities Improvement Act	C-75
December 30, 1975	84	Regional Development Incentives Act, An Act to amend the	C-74
December 30, 1975	85	Agricultural Products Cooperative Marketing Act, An Act to amend the	C-21
December 30, 1975	86	Animal Disease and Protection Act	C-28
February 25, 1976	87	Western Grain Stabilization Act	C-41
February 25, 1976	88	Halifax Relief Commission Pension Cotinuation Act	C-78
March 30, 1976	89	Appropriation Act No. 1, 1976	C-90
March 30, 1976	90	Appropriation Act No. 2, 1976	C-91
March 30, 1976	91	Temporary Immigration Security Act	C-85
March 30, 1976	92	Statute Law (Veterans and Returned Soldiers' Insurance) Amendment Act, 1976	C-86
March 30, 1976	93	Criminal Law Amendment Act, 1975	C-71
March 30, 1976	94	Feeds Act, An Act to amend the	S-10
May 5, 1976	95	Compensation for Former Prisoners of War Act	C-92
May 5, 1976	96	Motor Vehicle Tire Safety Act	S-8
May 5, 1976	97	Quarantine Act, An Act to amend the	S-31
May 20, 1976	98	Anti-Inflation Act, An Act to amend the	C-89
June 15, 1976	99	Senate and House of Commons Act and the Supplementary Retirement Benefits Act with respect to the escalation of certain payments thereunder, An Act to amend the	C-81
June 15, 1976	100	Aeronautics Act, An Act to amend the	S-34
June 15, 1976	101	Proprietary or Patent Medicine Act and to amend the Trade Marks Act, An Act to amend an Act to repeal the	S-35
June 29, 1976	102	Appropriation Act No. 3, 1976	C-93
June 29, 1976	103	Appropriation Act No. 4, 1976	C-94
June 29, 1976	104	Canada and France, Canada and Belgium and Canada and Israel, An Act to implement conventions for the avoidance of double taxation with respect to income tax between	S-32
July 16, 1976	105	Criminal Law Amendment Act (No. 2), 1976	C-84
July 16, 1976	106	Income Tax Act, An Act to amend the	C-58
July 16, 1976	107	Medical Care Act, An Act to amend the	C-68
July 16, 1976	108	Citizenship, An Act respecting	C-20
July 16, 1976	109	Canadian Wheat Board Act (No. 2), An Act to amend the	C-88

===== Local and private acts =====
Date of Assent	Index	Title	Bill Number
December 13, 1974	110	British Columbia Telephone Company, An Act respecting	S-11
February 27, 1975	111	International Air Transport Association, An Act respecting	S-18
July 30, 1975	112	Royal Canadian Legion, An Act respecting The	S-28
July 30, 1975	113	Exception from the general law relating to marriage in the case of Richard Fritz and Marianne Strass, An Act ta provide an	C-1001
July 30, 1975	114	Canadian Commercial and Industrial Bank, An Act to incorporate the	S-24
July 30, 1975	115	Alliance Security & Investigation, Ltd., An Act respecting	S-26
December 20, 1975	116	Northland Bank, An Act to incorporate the	C-1002
December 20, 1975	117	Eastern Canada Savings and Loan Company and Central & Nova Scotia Trust Company to amalgamate, An Act ta enable	S-29
June 15, 1976	118	United Grain Growers Limited, An Act respecting	S-33

==== 2nd Session ====
===== Public acts =====
Date of Assent	Index	Title	Bill Number
October 22, 1976	1	Port of Halifax Operations Act	C-14
December 15, 1976	2	Appropriation Act No. 5, 1976	C-28
December 22, 1976	3	Government Expenditures Restraint Act	C-19
February 24, 1977	4	Income tax, An Act to amend the statute law relating to	C-22
February 24, 1977	5	Customs Tariff, An Act to amend the	C-15
February 24, 1977	6	Excise Tax Act, An Act to amend th	C-21
March 29, 1977	7	Appropriation Act No. 1, 1977	C-44
March 29, 1977	8	Appropriation Act No. 2, 1977	C-45
March 29, 1977	9	Old Age Security Act, An Act to amend the	C-35
	10	Federal-Provincial Fiscal Arrangements and Established Programs Financing Act, 1977	C-37
May 12, 1977	11	Unemployment Insurance Entitlements Adjustment Act	C-52
May 12, 1977	12	Advance Payments for Crops Act	C-2
May 12, 1977	13	Pension Act, An Act to, amend the	C-11
June 16, 1977	14	Customs Tariff (No. 2), An Act to amend the	C-55
June 16, 1977	15	Tax Act (No. 2), An Act to amend the	C-54
June 16, 1977	16	Bank Act and the Quebec Savings Banks Act, An Act to amend the	C-39
June 16, 1977	17	Export Development Act, An Act to, amend the	C-47
June 16, 1977	18	Financial Administration Act and to repeal the Satisfied Securities Act, An Act to amend the	C-8
June 16, 1977	19	Motor Vehicle Safety Act, An Act to amend the	C-36
June 16, 1977	20	Historic Sites and Monuments Act, An Act to amend the	C-13
June 16, 1977	21	Railway Act, An Act to amend the	C-207
July 14, 1977	22	Appropriation Act No. 3, 1977	C-58
July 14, 1977	23	Farm Improvement Loans Act, the Small Businesses Loans Act and the Fisheries Improvement Loans Act, An Act to amend the	C-48
July 14, 1977	24	Government Organization (Scientific Activities) Act, 1976	C-26
July 14, 1977	25	Judges Act and other Acts in respect of judicial matters, An Act to amend the	C-50
July 14, 1977	26	Aeronautics Act and the National Transportation Act, An Act to amend the	C-46
July 14, 1977	27	Canada Deposit Insurance Corporation Act, An Act to amend the	C-3
July 14, 1977	28	Miscellaneous Statute Law Amendment Act, 1977	C-53
July 14, 1977	29	Conventions between Canada and Morocco, Canada and Pakistan, Canada and Singapore, Canada and the Philippines, Canada and the Dominican Republic and Canada and Switzerland for the avoidance of double taxation with respect to income tax, An Act to implement	C-12
July 14, 1977	30	Canada Lands Surveys Act, An Act to amend the	C-4
July 14, 1977	31	Diplomatic and Consular Privileges and Immunities Act	C-6
July 14, 1977	32	James Bay and Northern Quebec Native Claims Settlement Act	C-9
July 14, 1977	33	Canadian Human Rights Act	C-25
July 14, 1977	34	Auditor General Act	C-20
July 14, 1977	35	Fisheries Act and to amend the Criminal Code in consequence thereof, An Act to amend the	C-38
July 14, 1977	36	Canada Pension Plan, An Act to amend the	C-49
July 14, 1977	37	Bretton Woods Agreements Act, An Act to amend the	C-18
July 14, 1977	38	Currency and Exchange Act and to amend other Acts in consequence thereof, An Act to amend the	C-5
July 14, 1977	39	Canadian and British Insurance Companies Act and the Foreign Insurance Companies Act, An Act to amend the	S-3
July 14, 1977	40	Electoral Boundaries Readjustment Act (Beauharnois–Salaberry), An Act respecting the	C-283
July 14, 1977	41	Electoral Boundaries Readjustment Act (Blainville–Deux-Montagnes), An Act respecting the	C-427
July 14, 1977	42	Electoral Boundaries Readjustment Act (Brampton–Georgetown), An Act respecting the	C-392
July 14, 1977	43	Electoral Boundaries Readjustment Act (Cochrane), An Act respecting the	C-433
July 14, 1977	44	Electoral Boundaries Readjustment Act (Huron–Bruce), An Act respecting the	C-394
July 14, 1977	45	Electoral Boundaries Readjustment Act (Kootenay East–Revelstoke), An Act respecting the	C-406
July 14, 1977	46	Electoral Boundaries Readjustment Act (Laval), An Act respecting the	C-418
July 14, 1977	47	Electoral Boundaries Readjustment Act (Lethbridge–Foothills), An Act respecting the	C-405
July 14, 1977	48	Electoral Boundaries Readjustment Act (London–Middlesex), An Act respecting the	C-422
July 14, 1977	49	Electoral Boundaries Readjustment Act (Saint-Jacques), An Act respecting the	C-428
July 14, 1977	50	Electoral Boundaries Readjustment Act (Saint-Léonard–Anjou), An Act respecting the	C-429
July 14, 1977	51	Electoral Boundaries Readjustment Act (Wellington–Dufferin–Simcoe), An Act respecting the	C-393
August 5, 1977	52	Immigration Act, 1976	C-24
August 5, 1977	53	Criminal Law Amendment Act, 1977	C-51
August 5, 1977	54	Employment and Immigration Reorganization Act	C-27
August 5, 1977	55	Statute Law (Metric Conversion) Amendment Act, 1976	C-23
August 5, 1977	56	Canadian Wheat Board Act respecting the establishment of marketing plans and to amend the Western Grain Stabilization Act in consequence thereof, An Act to amend the	C-34
August 10, 1977	57	Air Traffic Control Services Continuation Act	C-63

===== Local and private acts =====
Date of Assent	Index	Title	Bill Number
July 14, 1977	58	Continental Bank of Canada, An Act to incorporate	C-1001

==== 3rd Session ====
===== Public acts =====
Date of Assent	Index	Title	Bill Number
December 15, 1977	1	Income Tax Act and to provide other authority for the raising of funds, An Act to amend the statute law relating to	C-11
December 15, 1977	2	Appropriation Act No. 3, 1977–78	C-15
December 20, 1977	3	Canada Elections Act, An Act to amend the	C-5
February 2, 1977	4	Income Tax Act and to establish the Employment Tax Credit Program, An Act to amend the	C-23
February 2, 1977	5	Air Canada Act, 1977	C-3
March 22, 1977	6	Appropriation Act No. 4, 1977–78	C-30
March 22, 1977	7	Appropriation Act No. 1, 1978–79	C-31
March 22, 1977	8	Canada Elections Act, the Election Expenses Act and the Northwest Territories Act in respect of territorial elections, An Act to amend the	C-33
March 22, 1977	9	Transfer of Offenders Act	C-21
March 22, 1977	10	Bank Act and the Quebec Savings Banks Act, An Act to amend the	C-16
March 22, 1977	11	Compensation for Former Prisoners of War Act, An Act to amend the	C-27
March 22, 1977	12	Electoral Boundaries Readjustment Act (Hochelaga–Maisonneuve), An Act respecting the	C-418
March 22, 1977	13	Electoral Boundaries Readjustment Act (Humber–Port au Port–St. Barbe), An Act respecting the	C-412
March 22, 1977	14	Electoral Boundaries Readjustment Act (Mégantic–Compton–Stanstead), An Act respecting the	C-423
March 22, 1977	15	Electoral Boundaries Readjustment Act (Pontiac–Gatineau–Labelle), An Act respecting the	C-358
March 22, 1977	16	Electoral Boundaries Readjustment Act (Prince Edward–Hastings), An Act respecting the	C-414
March 22, 1977	17	Electoral Boundaries Readjustment Act (Prince George–Peace River), An Act respecting the	C-267
March 22, 1977	18	Electoral Boundaries Readjustment Act (Saint-Henri–Westmount), An Act respecting the	C-415
March 22, 1977	19	Electoral Boundaries Readjustment Act (Sainte-Marie), An Act respecting the	C-417
April 12, 1978	20	Northern Pipeline Act	C-25
April 12, 1978	21	Cape Breton Development Corporation Act, An Act to amend the	C-38
April 12, 1978	22	Miscellaneous Statute Law Amendment Act, 1978	C-41
April 20, 1978	23	Postal Service Operations Act, 1978	C-45
April 20, 1978	24	Petroleum Administration Act and the Energy Supplies Emergency Act, An Act to amend the	C-19
April 20, 1978	25	Tax Rebate Discounting Act	C-46
April 20, 1978	26	Anti-Inflation Act and guidelines, An Act to amend the	C-18
April 20, 1978	27	Canada Labour Code, An Act to amend the	C-8
April 20, 1978	28	Farm Credit Act, An Act to amend the	C-29
April 20, 1978	29	Canadian Centre for Occupational Health and Safety Act	C-35
April 20, 1978	30	Fishing and Recreational Harbours Act	C-2
'June 30, 1978	31	Appropriation Act No. 2, 1978–79	C-61
'June 30, 1978	32	Income Tax Act and to authorize payments related to provincial sales tax reductions, An Act to amend the statute law relating to	C-56
'June 30, 1978	33	Financial Administration Act, An Act to amend the	C-10
'June 30, 1978	34	Canadian National Railways Capital Revision Act and the Railway Act and to amend and repeal certain other statutes in consequence thereof, An Act to amend the	C-17
'June 30, 1978	35	Currency and Exchange Act, An Act to amend the	C-39
'June 30, 1978	36	Criminal Code, An Act to amend the	C-42
'June 30, 1978	37	Pension Act and the Compensation for Former Prisoners of War Act, An Act to amend the	C-58
'June 30, 1978	38	Export Development Act, An Act to amend the	C-36
'June 30, 1978	39	Petroleum Corporations Monitoring Act	C-12
'June 30, 1978	40	Customs Tariff, An Act to amend the	C-48
'June 30, 1978	41	Maritime Code Act	C-54
'June 30, 1978	42	Income Tax Act and the Excise Tax Act in matters relating to the ownership and operation of small businesses, An Act to amend the	C-59
'October 10, 1978	43	By-elections, An Act to provide for an additional advance poll in respect of certain	C-66

===== Local and private acts =====
Date of Assent	Index	Title	Bill Number
March 22 and April 12, 1978	44	Bell Canada, An Act respecting	C-1001
March 22 and April 12, 1978	45	Marriage in the case of James Richard Borden and Judy Ann Borden, An Act to provide an exception from the public general law relating to	S-5
March 22 and April 12, 1978	46	Marriage in the case of François Eugène Arthur Waddell and Marie Anne Marguerite Benoît, An Act to provide an exception from the public general law relating to	S-6
March 22 and April 12, 1978	47	Royal Canadian Legion, An Act respecting The	S-10

==== 4th Session ====
===== Public acts =====
Date of Assent	Index	Title	Bill Number
October 18, 1978	1	Postal Services Continuation Act	C-8
October 24, 1978	2	Shipping Continuation Act	C-11
November 20, 1978	3	Old Age Security Act, An Act to amend the	C-5
November 23, 1978	4	Borrowing Authority Act, 1978–79	C-7
December 12, 1978	5	Income Tax Act to provide for a child tax credit and to amend the Family Allowances Act, 1973, An Act to amend the	C-10
December 12, 1978	6	Appropriation Act No. 3, 1978–79	C-25
December 22, 1978	7	Unemployment Insurance Act, 1971, An Act to amend the	C-14
December 22, 1978	8	Annuity to the Honourable Mr. Justice Donald Raymond Morand, An Act to authorize the granting of an immediate	C-33
December 22, 1978	9	Canada Business Corporations Act, An Act to amend the	S-5
December 22, 1978	10	Criminal Code, An Act to amend the	C-34
March 8, 1979	11	Judges Act, to amend An Act to amend the Judges Act and to amend certain other Acts in respect of the reconstitution of the courts in New Brunswick, Alberta and Saskatchewan, An Act to amend the	C-43
March 8, 1979	12	Health Resources Fund Act, An Act to amend the	C-2
March 15, 1979	13	Government Organization Act, 1979	C-35
March 15, 1979	14	Northwest Territories Act, An Act to amend the	C-28
March 15, 1979	15	Shipping Conferences Exemption Act, 1979	S-6
March 16, 1979	16	National Housing Act and the Central Mortgage and Housing Corporation Act and to make other related amendments, An Act to amend the	C-29
March 26, 1979	17	Energy Supplies Emergency Act, 1979	C-42
March 26, 1979	18	Bank Act and the Quebec Savings Banks Act, An Act to amend the	C-49

===== Local and private acts =====
Date of Assent	Index	Title	Bill Number
December 22, 1978	19	J. H. Poitras & Son Ltd., An Act to revive	S-8
