= Paul Cosgrove =

Canadian politician and judge

The Honourable Paul Cosgrove PC KC
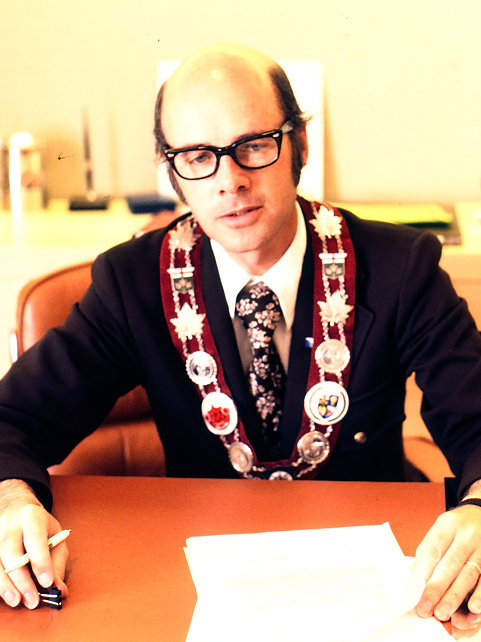
- Cosgrove in 1976

Member of Parliament for York—Scarborough
- In office February 18, 1980 – July 9, 1984
- Preceded by: Paul McCrossan (1978–1980)
- Succeeded by: Paul McCrossan (1984–1988)

Minister of Public Works
- In office March 3, 1980 – September 29, 1982
- Prime Minister: Pierre Trudeau
- Preceded by: Erik Nielsen
- Succeeded by: Roméo LeBlanc

3rd Mayor of Scarborough, Ontario
- In office 1973–1978
- Preceded by: Robert W. White
- Succeeded by: Ken Morrish

Personal details
- Born: December 30, 1934 (age 91) Thunder Bay, Ontario
- Party: Liberal
- Spouse: Frances McDonald (m. 1964)
- Education: University of St. Michael's College; Queen's University Faculty of Law
- Profession: Judge

Paul James Cosgrove, PC KC (born December 30, 1934), is a former Canadian jurist, lawyer and politician. He began his political career in the 1970s as alderman and then mayor of Scarborough, Ontario (now part of Toronto), then served as the member of parliament (MP) for the riding of York—Scarborough from 1980 to 1984. A member of the Liberal Party of Canada, he was a cabinet minister under Prime Minister Pierre Trudeau. He left politics to become an Ontario Superior Court judge before resigning in 2009.

== Early life and political career ==
Born in Thunder Bay, Ontario, Cosgrove graduated from the University of St. Michael's College (a federated university in the University of Toronto) in 1957 with a bachelor of arts degree, then went on to receive a law degree from the Queen's University Faculty of Law in 1960. He married Frances McDonald in 1964; they have four children together.

He served as president of the Liberal Party of Canada's Scarborough East riding association in the late 1960s, then entered municipal politics in 1970 as Scarborough alderman. He defeated the incumbent Robert W. White in the 1972 Scarborough mayoral election, and served as mayor from 1973 to 1978.

Following the resignation of York—Scarborough MP Robert Stanbury, Cosgrove secured the nomination in February 1978 as the riding's Liberal candidate, but lost to Progressive Conservative (PC) candidate Paul McCrossan in that October's by-election. McCrossan defeated Cosgrove again in the 1979 election, but by a narrower margin.

After the PC minority government fell in late 1979, Cosgrove and McCrossan faced each other again for the third time in the 1980 election; this time Cosgrove defeated McCrossan by more than 8000 votes to be elected to the House of Commons. With the Liberals forming majority government, Cosgrove was appointed to the cabinet of Prime Minister Pierre Trudeau that March as Minister of Public Works, Minister responsible for the Canada Mortgage and Housing Corporation, and Minister responsible for the National Capital Commission.

He was reassigned in a September 1982 cabinet shuffle to the position of Minister of State for Finance, supporting Minister of Finance Marc Lalonde. He was dropped from the cabinet in August 1983, but was appointed Queen's Counsel that December. He remained an MP until the dissolution of parliament the next year; he did not run again in the 1984 federal election.

== Judicial career ==
Cosgrove retired from the House of Commons to accept an appointment by Prime Minister John Turner to the bench of the Ontario Superior Court on July 9, 1984, shortly after Parliament was dissolved for the 1984 election. Cosgrove's judicial circuit was in Eastern Ontario with his court based in Brockville.

In 1999, Cosgrove stayed charges of murder against Julia Elliott after a 22-month trial. He ruled that the Crown attorney, police and a deputy attorney general had committed 150 constitutional violations, findings that were unanimously rejected by the Court of Appeal for Ontario in 2003. The Court ordered a new trial, and Elliott pleaded guilty to manslaughter.

The Attorney General of Ontario, Michael Bryant, subsequently filed a complaint with the Canadian Judicial Council (CJC) against Cosgrove, calling him unfit to be a judge, and accusing him of sullying reputations and of "vilifying the state". Cosgrove was suspended pending a hearing into his conduct that was scheduled for December 2004; he complained to the CJC that the scheduled hearing was unconstitutional and damaging to judicial independence. His lawyer claimed that Bryant's action created a situation in which the Attorney General could punish judges for making controversial decisions, since a complaint by an Attorney General automatically would result in suspension pending a hearing. According to Cosgrove's lawyer:

It creates a 'chilling effect' that will undermine the ability of judges to adjudicate fearlessly cases, as justice requires. This chilling effect undermines and is wholly inconsistent with judicial independence.

According to The Globe and Mail, Cosgrove's affidavit warned that judges might become afraid to criticize or rule against the Crown if they thought a vindictive attorney general could, in effect, end their careers simply by lodging a complaint. The consequences of this were argued to be so negative that the process effectively permitted an attorney general to become "the judge in his own cause". Both the Canadian Superior Courts Judges Association and the Ontario Criminal Lawyers' Association supported Cosgrove's case.

In October 2005, the trial division of the Federal Court of Canada ruled in favour of Cosgrove and stripped the attorney general of the power to force the CJC to conduct hearings that could remove judges from the bench; the ruling temporarily halted the proceedings against Cosgrove. On March 12, 2007, however, the appellate division of the Federal Court of Canada reversed the trial division, and found against Cosgrove. The Federal Court of Appeal set aside the decision of the Federal Court, dismissed the application for judicial review, and referred the matter back to the Inquiry Committee of the CJC.

On December 4, 2008, in a 4-1 decision, a committee of the CJC found grounds for recommending to the federal justice minister that Cosgrove be removed from office. The full Canadian Judicial Council, made up of 22 of Canada's chief justices and senior judges, met to consider the committee's recommendation. On March 31, 2009, the CJC formally recommended to Parliament that Cosgrove be removed, saying that "We find that Justice Cosgrove has failed in the execution of the duties of his judicial office and that public confidence in his ability to discharge those duties in the future has been irrevocably lost." The decision also stated that "We find that there is no alternative measure to removal that would be sufficient to restore public confidence in the judge in this case." This was the second time in the council's history that it recommended the removal of a judge; the same recommendation was made in 1996 in regards to then Justice Jean Bienvenue who resigned rather than wait for Parliament to decide his fate.

On April 2, 2009, Cosgrove resigned from the bench. If he had not done so, and had also not taken the option of making an application to the Federal Court for a judicial review of the finding, the House of Commons and Senate would have had to vote on whether to remove him from office, something which has never happened since Canadian Confederation.

== Federal electoral record ==
By-election: On Robert Stanbury's resignation, 16 October 1978: York—Scarborough
Party	Candidate	Votes	%	±%
Progressive Conservative	Paul McCrossan	55,455		
Liberal	Paul Cosgrove	21,431		
New Democratic	Ivan H. Jones	7,681		
No affiliation	Anne C. McBride	564		
Independent	Nick Moldovanyi	348		

1979 Canadian federal election: York—Scarborough
Party	Candidate	Votes	%	±%
Progressive Conservative	Paul McCrossan	36,718		
Liberal	Paul Cosgrove	32,699		
New Democratic	Frank Lowery	10,978		
Libertarian	Mathias Blecker	480		
Independent	Anne C. McBride	242		
Marxist–Leninist	Richard Pringle	97		

1980 Canadian federal election: York—Scarborough
Party	Candidate	Votes	%	±%
Liberal	Paul Cosgrove	39,208		
Progressive Conservative	Paul McCrossan	30,925		
New Democratic	Vinc Overend	10,939		
Independent	Anne C. McBride	384		
Libertarian	Andrew Siks	308		
Marxist–Leninist	Roger Carter	75		
