= Julie Enfield =

Canadian photographer and writer

- Born: Julie Enfield; Ottawa, Ontario
- Occupation(s): Photographer, writer

Julie Enfield (born in Ottawa, Ontario) is a Canadian portrait photographer and author of the book Kiss and Tell: An Intimate History of Kissing. Enfield lived in Italy from 1983 to 1996, where she worked in the fashion industry alongside Giorgio Armani, Franco Moschino, and Gianni Versace. In 1983, she married Italian architect Alberto Giulio Gioia.

Julie Enfield is the daughter of the Canadian M.P. and Q.C. barrister Frank A. Enfield.

== Career ==
=== Photographer ===
Enfield's work is in a number of private and corporate collections, and her photographs have been published in Inside Entertainment, Fashion Quarterly, Hello! Canada, and the Toronto Star. In 2008, her exhibit "Being Squared" – showcasing celebrity twin designers Dean and Dan Caten (Dsquared2), premiered at the Gibsone–Jessop Gallery in Toronto. Enfield's projects have been featured on CTV's FashionTelevision. Enfield was the exclusive photographer for Dsquared2 at the Vancouver Winter Olympics opening ceremonies. Enfield has a passion for capturing the moment and takes great pride in expressing the unique anima of her subjects.

=== Writer ===
In 2004, HarperCollins published her non-fiction title, Kiss and Tell: An Intimate History of Kissing. She has been featured on CITY TV's Breakfast Television, CBC's The National, CBC's Sounds Like Canada, Discovery Channel, CITY TV's Sex TV, in relation to her book on kissing. Her articles and book reviews have appeared in Chatelaine, Fashion Quarterly, Flare, Inside Entertainment, Rouge, the Globe and Mail and the Toronto Star.

== Awards and achievements ==
In 2008, Enfield was awarded first prize for Best Portrait in the TD Canada Trust SNAP '08 photo contest. Enfield won first prize for Best Portrait in the TD Canada Trust SNAP '09 photo contest and, in 2010, her portrait of Measha Brueggergosman received an honourable mention. In August 2008, her photo Toronto Tango was chosen as Picture of the Month at Canadian Geographic. In November 2009, her photo "Smoke and Mirrors" won the Picture of the Month Canadian Geographic. In October 2010, her photo Gloves 'n' Mask won the Picture of the Month Canadian Geographic. In 2012, her work "Keeper of Culture" was recognized as a finalist entry in National Geographic's Best Travel Portrait, and her work "Cat in the Act" has recently been published in National Geographic's Daily Dozen.

== Bibliography ==
=== Non-fiction ===
- Kiss and Tell: An Intimate History of Kissing. HarperCollins Canada. 2004. ISBN 0-00-200634-0.

=== Book reviews ===
- February 10, 2007, That's amore, I'll never forget my first (and only) meeting with Silvio Berlusconi, in the mid-1980s...
- October 1, 2006, April 17, 2005, Italians: Go figure: La Bella Figura: A Field Guide to the Italian Mind, by Beppe Severgnini: Broadway Books.
- October 10, 2005 Prose à porter: Men's Style: The Thinking Man's Guide to Dress by Russell Smith McClelland and Stewart.
- June 12, 2004: Biography: Catherine de' Medici: A Biography By Leonie Frieda, Weidenfeld and Nicolson.
