= Maurice Moreau =

Canadian politician

Maurice John Moreau

Member of Parliament for York—Scarborough
- In office 1963–1965
- Preceded by: Frank Charles McGee
- Succeeded by: Robert Stanbury

Personal details
- Born: 1 April 1927 Dollard, Saskatchewan, Canada
- Died: 18 March 2003 (aged 75)
- Party: Liberal
- Profession: Consulting engineer

Maurice John Moreau (1 April 1927 – 18 March 2003) was a Liberal party member of the House of Commons of Canada. He was born in Dollard, Saskatchewan and became a consulting engineer by career.

He was first elected at the York—Scarborough riding in the 1963 general election after an initial unsuccessful attempt there in 1962. After completing his only term, the 26th Canadian Parliament, Moreau left the House of Commons and did not seek another term in the 1965 election.
