= Frank Enfield =

Canadian politician

Frank A. Enfield

Member of Parliament for York—Scarborough
- In office 1953–1957
- Preceded by: first member
- Succeeded by: Frank Charles McGee

Personal details
- Born: June 16, 1920 Hamilton, Ontario
- Died: October 24, 1983 (aged 63)
- Party: Liberal
- Spouse: Esther Enfield
- Children: Julie Enfield
- Profession: Lawyer

Frank A. Enfield (June 16, 1920 – October 24, 1983) was a Canadian lawyer and politician. Enfield served as the Liberal Member of Parliament for York—Scarborough from 1953 to 1957 while Louis St. Laurent was Prime Minister.

During the Second World War he was a flight lieutenant in the Royal Canadian Air Force. After returning to Canada, he studied law at Osgoode Hall Law School and was called to the bar in 1951.

He entered politics, serving as a school trustee in Scarborough, Ontario, from 1949 to 1952, winning election to the school board while he was still in law school. He won his seat in the House of Commons of Canada in the 1953 federal election but was defeated in the 1957 election that swept to power the Tories under John Diefenbaker. He lost again when he tried to regain his seat in the 1958 election.
