= Trefann Court =

Coordinates: 43.656548°N 79.36201°W

- Neighbourhood
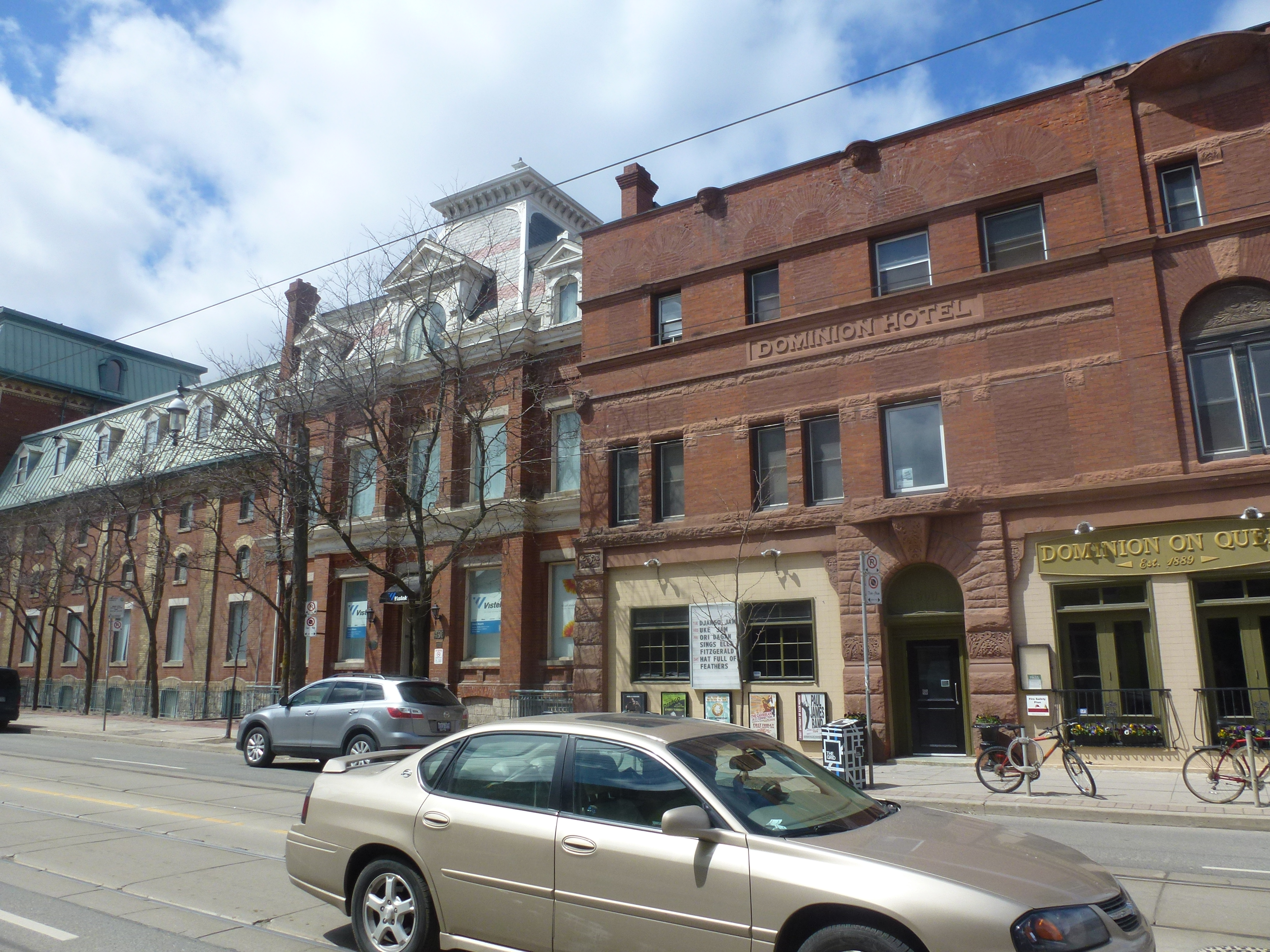
- View of Trefann Court along Queen Street East, west of Sumach Street

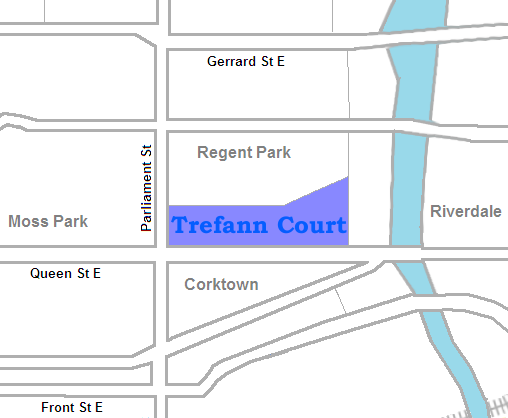
- City: Toronto
- Province: Ontario
- Country: Canada

Trefann Court is a small neighbourhood in the eastern part of downtown Toronto, Ontario, Canada. It is located on the north side of Queen Street between Parliament Street and River Street. It extends north only a short distance to Shuter St.

== History ==
In the nineteenth century Trefann Court was considered a part of the Cabbagetown neighbourhood. It was a mix of industry, linked to the nearby harbour, and working class housing of mainly Irish immigrants. In the post-war years the government began an extensive program of demolishing what were then considered "slums." To the north much of Cabbagetown was leveled to create Regent Park and St. James Town, and to the west a large portion of Corktown was cleared for the Moss Park housing project.

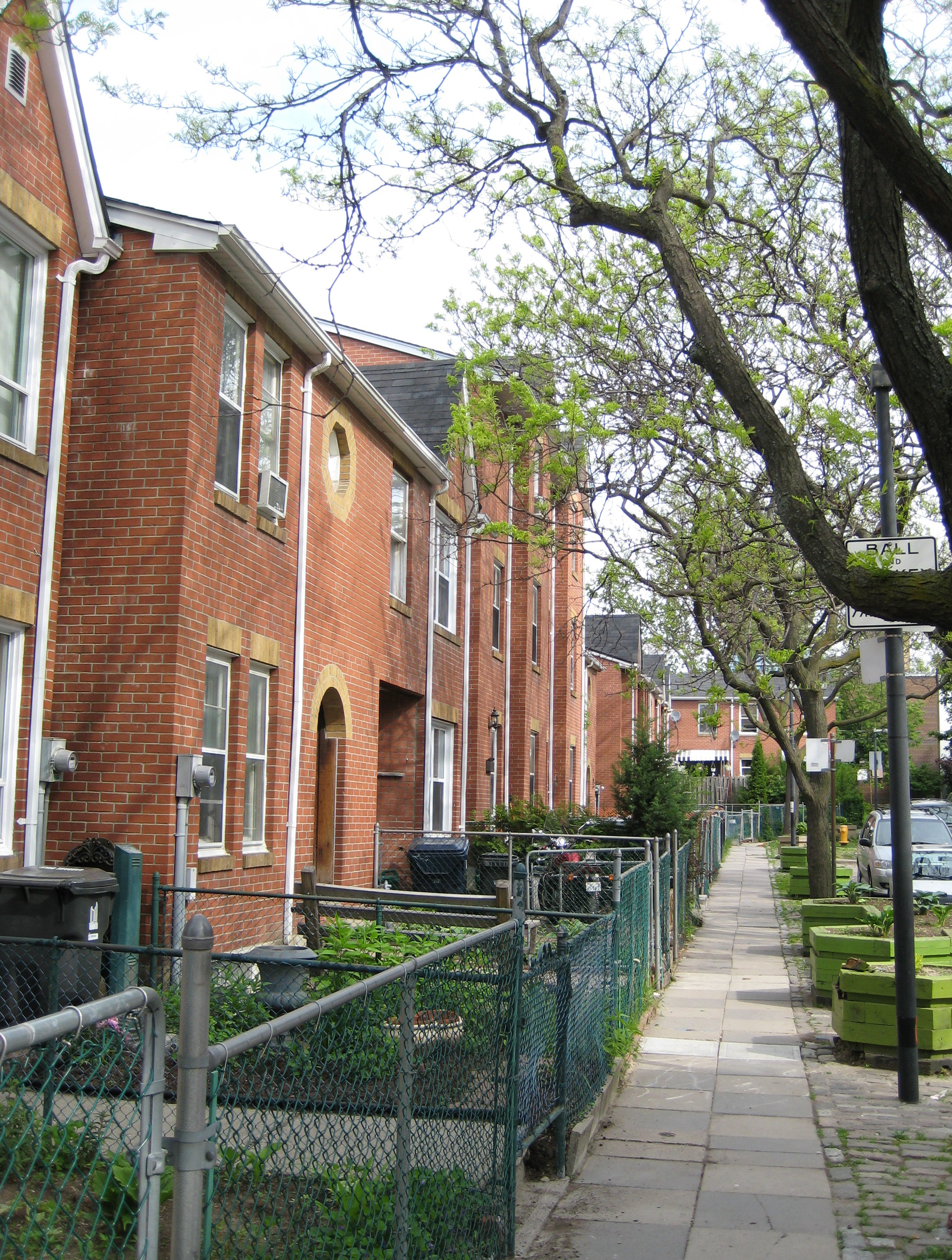
Row houses at Trefann Court. In the 1960s, the area was initially planned to be cleared for high-rise public housing, although local opposition prevented these plans from coming to fruition.

A similar program was proposed for Trefann Court: demolition followed by the erection of a series of high-rise public housing projects. This plan was proposed in the 1950s, but delayed as the other nearby projects took priority. In 1966 the city finally moved to expropriate the homes. The 1,500 residents that then lived in the area were at first concerned about compensation. The city promised to pay market value for the properties, but would not guarantee new housing for the evicted residents. This was a grave concern for residents, as Toronto was then experiencing an acute housing shortage. The land value of the area had also been depressed by the almost decade long period of pending expropriation that had seen few interested in moving to the area.

A young law student named John Sewell was recruited to help the residents challenge city hall. Sewell quickly became the leader of the movement to halt the project, launching the political career that would see him become mayor of Toronto. Opposed to him was alderwoman June Rowlands, also a future mayor, who defended the need for rebuilding the neighbourhood.

Soon the campaign shifted from one for better compensation to one of preventing demolition entirely. The Don Mount project across the river and Dundas and Broadview has seen protests as residents refused to leave their homes and had to be evicted by police. Faced with widespread opposition in 1969 the city abandoned its plan to demolish Trefann Court.

Trefann Court was, along with the battle over the Spadina Expressway, one of the founding causes of the reform movement that would rise to prominence in Toronto in the 1970s. In 1969 Sewell was elected to city council for the area covering Trefann along with fellow reform advocate Karl Jaffary. Also elected in that election was David Crombie who would be elected mayor in 1972, an election that saw the reform faction gain control over city council.

Trefann Court thus marked the end of Toronto's urban renewal projects that saw neighbourhoods replaced with housing towers. It also changed how city planning operated in Toronto. In future, local residents would play a central role in all planning processes rather than having decisions dictated by the city government. Trefann Court was rebuilt as a mixed-use community with a mix of subsidized and market-geared properties. Most of the original buildings were retained and new structures were built to be in keeping with the neighbourhood. These lessons were later applied to the St. Lawrence neighbourhood to the south, one of the most successful examples of modern urban renewal.
