= Frank Charles McGee =

Canadian politician

The Honourable Frank Charles McGee PC

Member of Parliament for York—Scarborough
- In office 1957–1963
- Preceded by: Frank Enfield
- Succeeded by: Maurice Moreau

Personal details
- Born: 3 March 1926 Ottawa, Ontario, Canada
- Died: 4 April 1999 (aged 73)
- Party: Progressive Conservative
- Relations: Charles McCool (Maternal Grandfather); John Joseph McGee (Paternal Grandfather); Thomas D'Arcy McGee (Grand Uncle); Grattan O'Leary (Father-in-law); Joanne Campbell (Niece); Joe Cressy (Great nephew)
- Profession: Businessman, Citizenship judge

Frank Charles McGee, PC (3 March 1926 – 4 April 1999) was a Canadian businessman, member of parliament, and, briefly, a Cabinet minister in the government of Prime Minister John Diefenbaker.

McGee had a family history of public service. Both of his grandfathers held positions; John Joseph McGee as Clerk of the Privy Council from 1882 to 1907, and his maternal grandfather, Charles McCool, served as an MP. Frank McGee was also a grandnephew of Father of Confederation and member of parliament, Thomas D'Arcy McGee.

== Background ==
McGee studied journalism at what was then Carleton College in Ottawa. In 1943, he enlisted in the Royal Canadian Air Force at the age of 17 and served until the end of World War II in 1945. He settled in Toronto after the war where he worked as a purchase manager for Sears.

== Federal politics ==
A Progressive Conservative, McGee was first elected to the House of Commons of Canada as the MP for York-Scarborough in the 1957 general election that saw the Tories form a minority government under John George Diefenbaker. McGee was re-elected in 1958 when the Conservatives formed a majority government and 1962 when they were reduced again to a minority. He became Parliamentary Secretary to the Minister of Citizenship and Immigration in 1962 and held the position until Diefenbaker appointed him to Cabinet as Minister without Portfolio in March 1963, weeks before the April 1963 election in which the Conservatives lost power and McGee lost his seat.

McGee was unsuccessful in his attempt to regain his York-Scarborough seat in the 1965 election. He ran again in the 1972 election and was initially thought to have been elected, an accomplishment that would have made the Progressive Conservatives under Robert Stanfield the largest party in the House of Commons, which may have resulted in a Tory minority government. However, a judicial recount determined that McGee had lost the election by four votes.

As an MP, McGee was a strong opponent of capital punishment, and in 1960 he introduced a private members bill to abolish the practice. His stance was initially unpopular and led to death threats against himself and his family. Though his bill did not pass his initiative led to amendments to the Criminal Code abolishing capital punishment for several crimes. The movement for abolition led to capital punishment being halted in practice in 1962 with the practice being formally abolished in 1976. McGee also worked to remove corporal punishments from the Criminal Code of Canada, such as use of the cat-o'-nine-tails. He also advocated liberalization of Canada's divorce laws and legal reforms to improve the status of women.

== After politics ==
Following his departure from parliament, McGee worked as a political reporter for the Toronto Star and was also host of the CBC television program The Sixties. In 1984, he was appointed to the Security Intelligence Review Committee for a five-year term. In 1990, he was appointed a Citizenship Judge.
