= Robert W. White (mayor) =

Mayor of Scarborough, Ontario

2nd Mayor of Scarborough, Ontario
- In office 1969–1972
- Preceded by: Albert Campbell
- Succeeded by: Paul Cosgrove

Personal details
- Born: 1922 Scarborough, Ontario
- Died: 1985 (aged 64)
- Spouse: Edna
- Children: 4

Robert W. White (1922–1985) was mayor of Scarborough, Ontario from 1969 until 1972; the second person to hold the office.

White was a businessman who operated a florist business, James White & Sons, founded by his grandfather in 1920 and still operated by the White family as of 2022.

He was elected a school trustee in 1956 before being elected to Scarborough Township Council in 1959. When Scarborough mayor Ab Campbell was appointed Metro Chairman in 1969, Scarbrough council acclaimed White to succeed him as mayor and he went on to be elected outright in the 1969 municipal election.

During his tenure in office, the Scarborough Civic Centre and Scarborough Town Centre were planned and built.

White was embroiled in a scandal when he accepted a free flight from a land developer so that he would return to Scarborough from Halifax, Nova Scotia in time to vote for a public housing project in which the developer was involved. Earlier, in 1960 when he was a town councillor, White proposed a bylaw that zoned an area that included his florist business' two acre Kennedy Street property for apartment buildings and failed to declare a conflict of interest. This vote also became an issue during the 1972 election. The controversies led to his defeat in the 1972 mayoral election by Paul Cosgrove.
