= Canadian Urban Institute =

Canadian not-for-profit organization

- Formation: 1990
- Founder: Municipality of Metropolitan Toronto
- Headquarters: Toronto, Canada
- President, CEO: Mary W. Rowe
- Website: canurb.org

The Canadian Urban Institute (CUI) is a national organization based in Canada dedicated to building vibrant, equitable, and sustainable cities. Established in 1990, CUI acts as a platform for collaboration among urban professionals, policymakers, community leaders, and the public, providing research, advocacy, and events that explore and address the challenges and opportunities facing Canadian cities.

== History ==
The institute was established in 1990 by the Municipality of Metropolitan Toronto and the City of Toronto and led by veteran Toronto city councilor Richard Gilbert. Former Toronto mayor and federal cabinet minister, the Honourable David Crombie, served as its president and chief executive officer from 2001 to 2007. Crombie was followed in the position by former Winnipeg mayor Glen Murray. Murray stood down following his election to the Legislative Assembly of Ontario in 2010 and was succeeded by former Hamilton mayor Fred Eisenberger, who formally took office on February 7, 2011. Its current president and CEO is Mary W. Rowe.

== Mission ==
The Canadian Urban Institute aims to advance the understanding and practice of urbanism in Canada. The CUI envisions Canadian cities as places where all residents can thrive, supported by resilient infrastructure, equitable access to resources, and inclusive public spaces.

CUI works across several key action areas, including:

- Main streets and downtowns
- Housing and homelessness
- Infrastructure and transit
- Climate change, sustainability and resilience
- Local economies
- Regional leadership and governance
- Equity and reconciliation

== Programs ==
CUI holds conferences and seminars, conducts research, and produces publications on social and economic issues that impact the urban sector including social development, infrastructure, and sustainable housing. The organization presents annual Brownie Awards to groups that demonstrate leadership, environmental sustainability, and innovation.

In 2020, CUI created three online platforms to provide information about the COVID-19 pandemic: CityWatch Canada, CityShare Canada, and Bring Back Main Street.

In 2021, the institute launched My Main Street, a two-year program to revitalize cites' economies by providing small businesses with market research and $10,000.

=== International partnerships ===
Over the course of its history, the institute had an active international program that works in partnership with cities and regions around the world to improve planning, urban management, service delivery, environmental management, and local economic development. CUI has been active in a range of countries including the Philippines, Ethiopia, Jamaica, Cuba, Honduras, Peru, Paraguay, Bosnia and Herzegovina, and countries within Central and Eastern Europe such as Ukraine, Poland, and Latvia. The CUI is helping to advance regional economic development in Ukraine, local economic development in the Philippines, local government reform in Jamaica, and improved urban management in Ethiopia.
