= Humber—Port au Port—St. Barbe =

Former federal electoral district in Newfoundland and Labrador, Canada

Newfoundland and Labrador electoral district

Defunct federal electoral district
- Legislature: House of Commons
- District created: 1976
- District abolished: 1987
- First contested: 1979
- Last contested: 1984

Humber—Port au Port—St. Barbe (formerly known as Humber—St. Barbe) was a federal electoral district in Newfoundland and Labrador, Canada, that was represented in the House of Commons of Canada from 1979 to 1988. This riding was created in the 1976 redistribution as "Humber—St. Barbe" from parts of Humber—St. George's—St. Barbe riding. The name of the electoral district was changed to "Humber—Port au Port—St. Barbe" in 1978.

It was abolished in the 1987 redistribution when it was redistributed into Burin—St. George's and Humber—St. Barbe—Baie Verte ridings.

== Members of Parliament ==
This riding elected the following members of Parliament:

Parliament	Years	Member	Party
Humber—Port au Port—St. Barbe; Riding created from Humber—St. George's—St. Barbe
31st	1979–1980	Fonse Faour	New Democratic
32nd	1980–1984	Brian Tobin	Liberal
33rd	1984–1988	Brian Tobin	Liberal
Riding dissolved into Burin—St. George's and Humber—St. Barbe—Baie Verte

== Election results ==
1979 Canadian federal election
Party	Candidate	Votes
New Democratic	Fonse Faour	15,872
Liberal	George Billard	8,782
Progressive Conservative	George Hutchings	5,941

1980 Canadian federal election
Party	Candidate	Votes
Liberal	Brian Tobin	13,170
New Democratic	Fonse Faour	9,535
Progressive Conservative	Ben Alexander	6,852

1984 Canadian federal election
Party	Candidate	Votes
Liberal	Brian Tobin	17,409
Progressive Conservative	Mike Monaghan	16,916
New Democratic	Ken Gould	1,530
Independent	Derek Ernest Woodman	196

== See also ==
- List of Canadian electoral districts
- Historical federal electoral districts of Canada
