= Grattan O'Leary =

Canadian politician

The Honourable Grattan O'Leary

Canadian Senator from Ontario
- In office September 24, 1962 – April 7, 1976
- Appointed by: John G. Diefenbaker

Personal details
- Born: Michael Grattan O'Leary; February 18, 1888 Percé, Quebec, Canada
- Died: April 7, 1976 (aged 88) Ottawa, Ontario, Canada
- Party: Progressive Conservative Party (1962-1976)
- Relations: Frank McGee (son-in-law)
- Profession: Politician; journalist; newspaper reporter; publisher

Michael Grattan O'Leary (February 19, 1888–April 7, 1976) was a Canadian journalist, publisher and a member of the Senate of Canada.

== Background ==
He was born in Percé, in the Gaspé, Quebec on February 19, 1888. He was educated in a one-room schoolhouse in Percé until the age of eleven or twelve, after which continued to read and educate himself informally while working in a lumber mill. At the age of fifteen, he went to sea and worked for several years as an oiler. He then worked various jobs in Saint John and Richibucto, including as a brewery worker, lathe operator, and store clerk.

== Public career ==
His career in journalism began in 1909 with the St. John Standard when he entered the newspaper's editorial office and asked for a job on a whim. He spent less than two years there as an apprentice before travelling to Ottawa to work for the Ottawa Journal in 1911. He arrived in Ottawa on March 1, 1911. Instead of going to the newspaper office, he went to Parliament and sat in the Gallery to listen to Wilfrid Laurier and Robert Borden for several hours, nearly missing out on the job because of it. The same year, he was appointed to the Parliamentary Press Gallery, a role he retained for more than 20 years.

His first major assignment for the Ottawa Journal was reporting on the Titanic disaster in April 1912. Because O'Leary had previously been a seaman, he was chosen to interview survivors of the shipwreck. He arrived in New York just hours before the Carpathia delivered Titanic's survivors to the port. After managing to get a police press pass from an Associated Press reporter, he went to the docks and interviewed survivors as they came down the gangplank. His coverage was published in the Journal the following day, on April 19. Shortly after, the Ottawa Citizen alleged that O'Leary had not been at the docks, and had instead lifted parts of his article from the New York Herald and claimed it as his own work. O'Leary and P. D. Ross (owner of the Journal) threatened to sue the Citizen. At the end of September 1912, the Citizen announced that the lawsuit had been dropped by mutual agreement.

O'Leary would again butt heads with the Citizen two years later. O'Leary travelled to Massachusetts and interviewed X. Henry Goodnough, Chief Engineer of the Massachusetts Board of Health, about water filtration, publishing his writings about the risks of mechanical filtration in late March 1914. Water sources and pollution were topics of interest in Ottawa at the time due to local typhoid epidemics in 1911 and 1912 that had killed over 170 people. The Citizen accused O'Leary of reporting false information and claimed that he had not gone to Massachusetts. Ross threatened once more to sue the Citizen for libel, and the Citizen retracted its claim.

On February 3, 1916, O'Leary was dining at the Château Laurier with Sam Hughes (Minister of Militia) and others when he heard of the fire in the nearby Parliament building. He rushed over and climbed through a window to get into the building in order to retrieve his typewriter from the reporters' work room on the main floor, navigating through smoke-filled halls to get outside.

O'Leary was later sent to Halifax in the aftermath of the explosion on December 6, 1918 to report for the Journal.

He eventually joined the editorial staff of the Journal, rising to associate editor in 1924. He became the Vice President of the Journal Publishing Company in 1949 and President in 1957 after the death of E. Norman Smith. He retired from the editorial staff on January 1, 1962.

At various times, he was the Ottawa correspondent of The Times, a contributor to British, United States and Canadian magazines, and the Canadian Editor of Collier's.

He attended imperial and international conferences in London, Washington, and Canberra, and was at the Potsdam Conference in 1945.

O'Leary took a very an active interest in public affairs. He ran as a Conservative Party candidate in the federal riding of Gaspé in the general election of 1925 but was defeated.

He was a confidant of a number of prime ministers, including Arthur Meighen and John Diefenbaker. He chaired the Royal Commission on Publications. O'Leary was appointed by Diefenbaker to the Senate in 1962.

He also served as the rector of Queen's University in Kingston, Ontario in 1968 but was forced to resign the following year due to student activism amidst claims that he was "out of touch with student needs."

In 1946, O'Leary launched a campaign to establish an official residence for the leader of the Official Opposition. He raised money from friends and associates in Ottawa, established a trust fund, and searched for a suitable property. The trust acquired Stornoway from the Perley-Robertson family for the discounted price of $55,000, and the house began serving as the opposition leader's residence in 1950.

== Personal life ==
On July 1, 1913, O'Leary married Mary Honoria McKenna. The couple had four sons and one daughter: Dillon, Brian, Owen, Maurice, and Moira. Dillon and Brian both became newspapermen in their own right. Owen served in the Royal Canadian Air Force and died in World War II. Moira married Frank McGee, a federal politician and grandnephew of Thomas D'Arcy McGee.

He died in Ottawa on April 7, 1976.

== Honours and Legacy ==
In 1952, St. Francis Xavier University in Antigonish, Nova Scotia awarded an honorary degree of Doctor of Laws to O'Leary, "whose facile mind and tireless hand have helped write the great Canadian story of the day."

He was awarded an honorary doctorate of social sciences by the University of Ottawa in 1961 for his contribution "to the literature of Canadian freedom through the effective exercise of an active and unfettered press."

In March 1976, just weeks before O'Leary's death, the Queen's University Senate introduced a student award in his name. The Grattan O'Leary Prize in Canadian History is "awarded annually to the student achieving the highest standing in a 300- or 400-level course in Canadian political history."

== Archives ==
There is a Grattan O'Leary fonds at Library and Archives Canada.

== Sources ==
- O'Leary, Grattan (1977). Grattan O'Leary: Recollections of People, Press, and Politics. Toronto: Macmillan of Canada. ISBN 0770515231.
- Smith, I. Norman (1974). The Journal Men: P. D. Ross, E. Norman Smith and Grattan O'Leary of The Ottawa Journal: Three Great Canadian Newspapermen and the Tradition They Created. Toronto: McClelland and Stewart Limited. ISBN 0771081928.
