= Inside Entertainment =

Inside Entertainment is a Canadian entertainment news program. The show was produced in Calgary, Alberta and aired on the Global and CH networks throughout Canada. It no longer airs as of 2006.

The show was hosted by Calgary-based Su-Ling Goh.
