= York—Scarborough (federal electoral district) =

Former federal electoral district in Ontario, Canada

Ontario electoral district
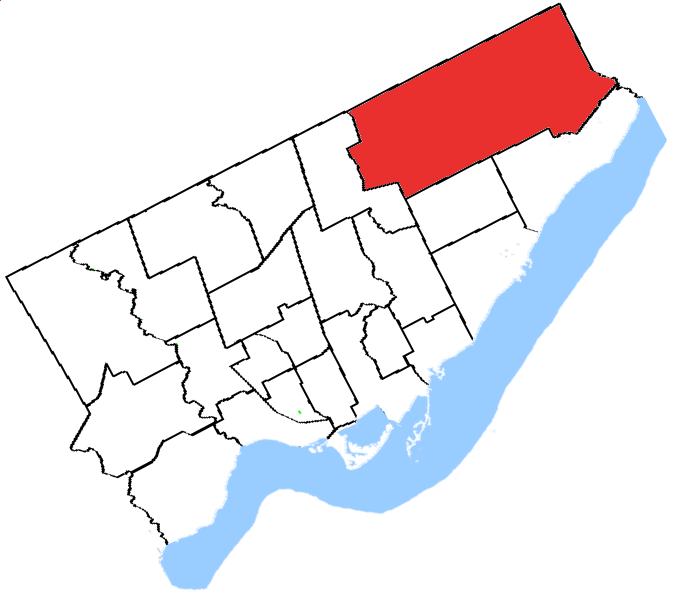
- York—Scarborough's borders from 1976 to 1987

Defunct federal electoral district
- Legislature: House of Commons
- District created: 1952
- District abolished: 1987
- First contested: 1953
- Last contested: 1984

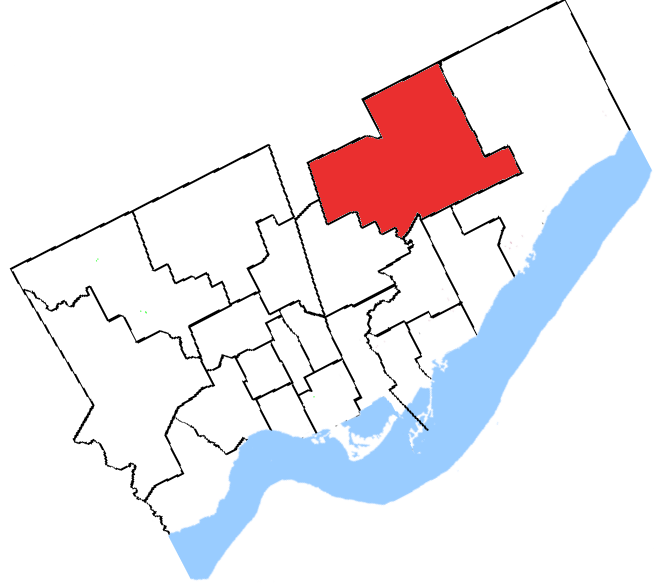
York—Scarborough's borders from 1966 to 1976

York—Scarborough was a federal electoral district represented in the House of Commons of Canada from 1953 to 1988. It was located in the province of Ontario. In the twelve general elections held during York—Scarborough's existence, the party that won here also won the election.

Initially, it included the southern part of York County, Ontario, being now the northern part of Scarborough and parts of North York and Markham. The riding was created in 1952 from parts of York East and York North ridings.

In 1966, it was redefined to lie entirely within the Municipality of Metropolitan Toronto and consisted of the eastern part of the Borough of North York and the north-western part of the Borough of Scarborough. In 1976 (with effect from the 1979 general election), the riding was shifted to the east, taking in only the easternmost part of North York, and all of northern Scarborough. The electoral district was abolished in 1987 (with effect from the 1988 general election) when it was redistributed between Don Valley North, Scarborough—Agincourt and Scarborough—Rouge River ridings.

== Members of Parliament ==
This riding has elected the following members of Parliament:

Parliament	Years	Member	Party
Riding created from York East and York North
22nd	1953–1957	Frank Enfield	Liberal
23rd	1957–1958	Frank Charles McGee	Progressive Conservative
24th	1958–1962	Frank Charles McGee	Progressive Conservative
25th	1962–1963	Frank Charles McGee	Progressive Conservative
26th	1963–1965	Maurice Moreau	Liberal
27th	1965–1968	Robert Stanbury	Liberal
28th	1968–1972	Robert Stanbury	Liberal
29th	1972–1974	Robert Stanbury	Liberal
30th	1974–1977	Robert Stanbury	Liberal
30th	1978–1979	Paul McCrossan	Progressive Conservative
31st	1979–1980	Paul McCrossan	Progressive Conservative
32nd	1980–1984	Paul Cosgrove	Liberal
33rd	1984–1988	Paul McCrossan	Progressive Conservative
Riding dissolved into Don Valley North, Scarborough—Agincourt and Scarborough—Rouge River

== Electoral history ==
1953 Canadian federal election: York—Scarborough
Party	Candidate	Votes	%	±%
Liberal	Frank Enfield	14,889		
Progressive Conservative	Stanley Nelson Schatz	14,221		
Co-operative Commonwealth	Arthur Raynard Elliott	4,184		
Social Credit	Stephen Sedford Thorlakson	580		

1957 Canadian federal election: York—Scarborough
Party	Candidate	Votes	%	±%
Progressive Conservative	Frank Charles McGee	42,299		
Liberal	Frank A. Enfield	22,353		
Co-operative Commonwealth	Elva Reta Sigen	8,931		
Social Credit	E. Shipley Birrell	1,600		

1958 Canadian federal election: York—Scarborough
Party	Candidate	Votes	%	±%
Progressive Conservative	Frank Charles McGee	57,396		
Liberal	Frank A. Enfield	22,019		
Co-operative Commonwealth	Elva R. Sigen	8,123		
Social Credit	E. Shipley Birrell	653		

1962 Canadian federal election: York—Scarborough
Party	Candidate	Votes	%	±%
Progressive Conservative	Frank Charles McGee	49,643		
Liberal	Maurice Moreau	44,349		
New Democratic	Edward G. Phillips	26,819		
Social Credit	E. Shipley Birrell	1,452		

1963 Canadian federal election: York—Scarborough
Party	Candidate	Votes	%	±%
Liberal	Maurice Moreau	63,049		
Progressive Conservative	Frank Charles McGee	41,535		
New Democratic	Edward G. Phillips	26,819		
Social Credit	J. Alex Ford	895		

1965 Canadian federal election: York—Scarborough
Party	Candidate	Votes	%	±%
Liberal	Robert Stanbury	58,501		
Progressive Conservative	Frank Charles McGee	54,659		
New Democratic	Edward G. Phillips	33,821		
New Capitalist	Frank O'Hearn	600		

1968 Canadian federal election: York—Scarborough
Party	Candidate	Votes	%	±%
Liberal	Robert Stanbury	37,374		
Progressive Conservative	Alan Milliken Heisey Sr.	15,458		
New Democratic	W. E. Ted Mann	10,724		

1972 Canadian federal election: York—Scarborough
Party	Candidate	Votes	%	±%
Liberal	Robert Stanbury	39,219		
Progressive Conservative	Winnett Boyd	37,368		
New Democratic	David William Warner	16,584		

1974 Canadian federal election: York—Scarborough
Party	Candidate	Votes	%	±%
Liberal	Robert Stanbury	47,450		
Progressive Conservative	Ron Collister	38,711		
New Democratic	David William Warner	11,552		
Independent	Paul R. Mollon	274		
Marxist–Leninist	Olga Dobosh	161		
Independent	Arthur Wright	140		

By-election: On Mr. Stanbury's resignation, 16 October 1978: York—Scarborough
Party	Candidate	Votes	%	±%
Progressive Conservative	Paul McCrossan	55,455		
Liberal	Paul Cosgrove	21,431		
New Democratic	Ivan H. Jones	7,681		
No affiliation	Anne C. McBride	564		
Independent	Nick Moldovanyi	348		

1979 Canadian federal election: York—Scarborough
Party	Candidate	Votes	%	±%
Progressive Conservative	Paul McCrossan	36,718		
Liberal	Paul Cosgrove	32,699		
New Democratic	Frank Lowery	10,978		
Libertarian	Mathias Blecker	480		
Independent	Anne C. McBride	242		
Marxist–Leninist	Richard Pringle	97		

1980 Canadian federal election: York—Scarborough
Party	Candidate	Votes	%	±%
Liberal	Paul Cosgrove	39,208		
Progressive Conservative	Paul McCrossan	30,925		
New Democratic	Vinc Overend	10,939		
Independent	Anne C. McBride	384		
Libertarian	Andrew Siks	308		
Marxist–Leninist	Roger Carter	75		

1984 Canadian federal election: York—Scarborough
Party	Candidate	Votes	%	±%
Progressive Conservative	Paul McCrossan	48,809		
Liberal	June Rowlands	35,869		
New Democratic	Yvonne Bondarchuk	13,260		
Libertarian	George Dance	1,067		
Independent	Anne C. McBride	704		
Independent	Dona Cauchon	666		

== See also ==
- List of Canadian electoral districts
- Historical federal electoral districts of Canada
