= David Crombie =

Canadian politician; mayor of Toronto

The Honourable David Crombie PC OC OOnt
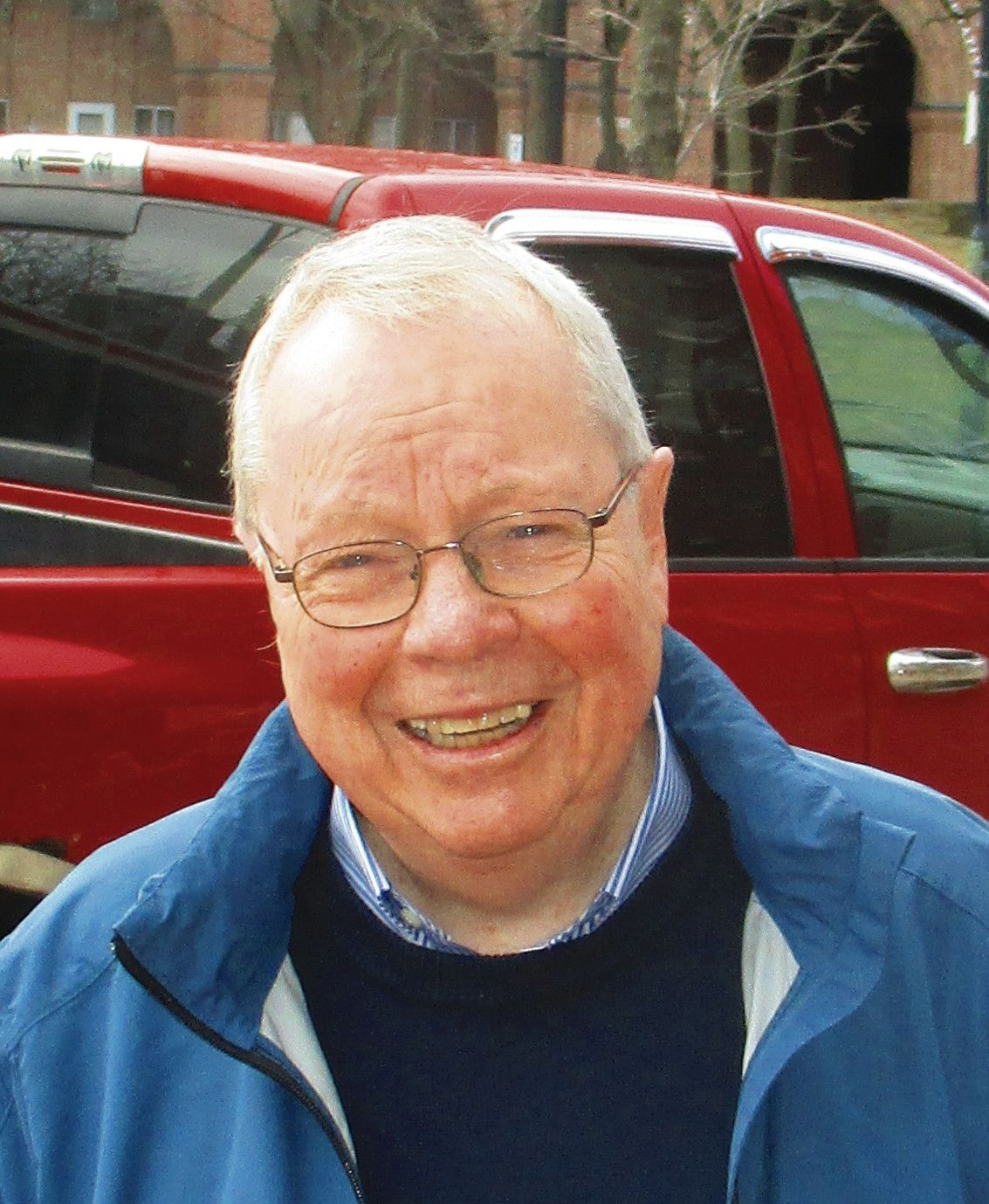
- David Crombie, 2016

56th Mayor of Toronto
- In office December 1, 1972 – August 31, 1978
- Preceded by: William Dennison
- Succeeded by: Fred Beavis (Interim)

Member of Parliament for Rosedale
- In office August 31, 1978 – October 1, 1988
- Preceded by: Donald Stovel Macdonald
- Succeeded by: David MacDonald

Minister of National Health and Welfare
- In office June 4, 1979 – March 2, 1980
- Prime Minister: Joe Clark
- Preceded by: Monique Bégin
- Succeeded by: Monique Bégin

Minister of Indian Affairs and Northern Development
- In office September 17, 1984 – June 29, 1986
- Prime Minister: Brian Mulroney
- Preceded by: Doug Frith
- Succeeded by: Bill McKnight

Secretary of State for Canada and Minister responsible for Multiculturalism
- In office June 30, 1986 – March 30, 1988
- Prime Minister: Brian Mulroney
- Preceded by: Benoît Bouchard
- Succeeded by: Lucien Bouchard

Other offices
- 1969–1972: Toronto Alderman

Personal details
- Born: David Edward Crombie; April 24, 1936 (age 90) Swansea, Ontario, Canada
- Party: Progressive Conservative
- Spouse: Shirley Ann (Bowden) Crombie
- Children: Jonathan, Robin, Carrie
- Occupation: Professor; politician

David Edward Crombie PC OC OOnt (born April 24, 1936) is a former Canadian academic and politician who served as the 56th mayor of Toronto from 1972 to 1978. Crombie was elected to Parliament following his tenure as mayor. A member of the Progressive Conservative (PC) Party, he served as minister of national health and welfare from 1979 to 1980, minister of Indian affairs and northern development from 1984 to 1986, and secretary of state for Canada from 1986 to 1988.

== Early life ==
Crombie was born in Swansea, then a village west of Toronto, the son of Vera Edith (Beamish) and Norman Davis Crombie. He was a lecturer in politics and urban affairs at Ryerson in the 1960s when he became involved in Toronto's urban reform movement. At the time, the city had a very pro-development city council that allowed a great deal of demolition of older buildings, including houses, to make way for the construction of apartment blocks, office towers, and highways (see Spadina Expressway). Crombie, along with John Sewell and other urban reformers, became a leader in a grassroots movement that favoured curtailing development in favour of improving social services and prioritizing community interests.

== Municipal politics ==
Crombie was elected to Toronto's city council in 1970, and became Mayor of Toronto in 1972, ushering in an era of socially responsible urban development inspired by thinkers such as Jane Jacobs. Crombie was the first mayor who represented the reform movement of Toronto politics, and his policies differed sharply from those of the Old Guard who preceded him.

=== Mayor of Toronto ===
Much of Crombie's time as mayor was spent trying to rein in the development industry. He initially imposed a 45-foot (13.7 m) limit on all new constructions, but this was overturned by the Ontario Municipal Board. Crombie then put forward a new official plan that imposed varying height restrictions across the city, and this was upheld by the board.

The Spadina Expressway had been halted by premier Bill Davis in 1971, but Davis continued to support the construction of the Allen Expressway in the north. Crombie attempted but failed to have it halted. He was more successful in countering plans for the Scarborough Expressway; all work was halted during Crombie's term, leading to its eventual cancellation.

Crombie also opposed the traditional pattern of demolishing poorer neighbourhoods and replacing them with housing projects. The plans to redevelop areas such as Trefann Court, Kensington Market, and Cabbagetown ended under Crombie. Instead, he oversaw the creation of the St. Lawrence neighbourhood, an area of mid-rise, mixed-use, mixed-income buildings that followed Jane Jacobs's vision of urban planning.

Crombie was re-elected in 1974 and 1976 with large majorities. Because of his great public appeal and his height of only 5 feet 5 inches (1.65 m), he was repeatedly described in the media as the city's "tiny, perfect mayor".

== Federal politics ==
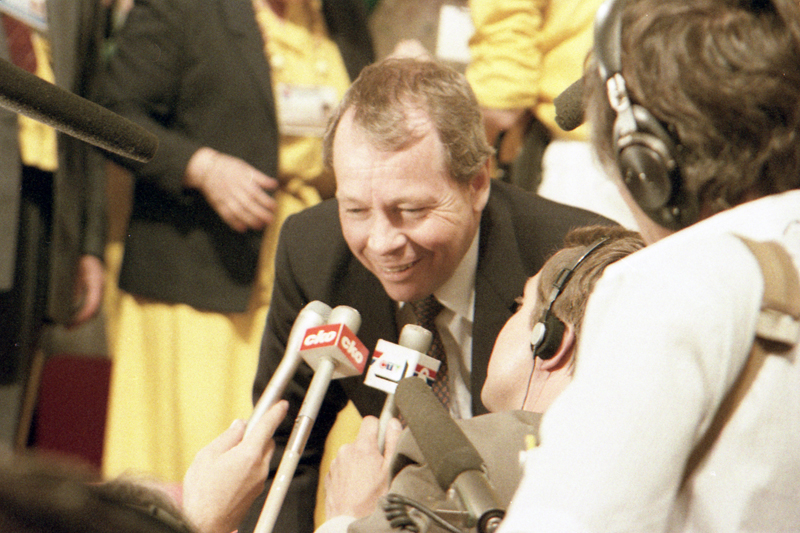
Crombie speaks to reporters on the floor of the 1983 PC leadership convention

He left City Hall in 1978 to move to federal politics, contesting a by-election held for the Rosedale electoral district as a Progressive Conservative candidate. The seat was vacated by liberal finance minister Donald Macdonald. Crombie won the by-election by a large margin against Liberal star candidate John Evans, then president of University of Toronto. Evans' candidacy was weighted down by the Liberals' unpopularity at the time (Note: 15 by-election was held on the same day. The Liberals lose 6 of the 7 seats they held prior. See By-elections to the 30th Canadian Parliament) and damaged by the unexpectedly competitive nomination challenge launch by Anne Cools. (Note: Her campaign for the nomination was documented in the National Film Board of Canada's 1979 film The Right Candidate for Rosedale.) Crombie defeated Cools in the general elections held in 1979 and 1980, and future foreign minister Bill Graham in 1984.

=== First Nations and Inuit Health Reform ===
Crombie served as Minister of Health and Welfare in the short-lived minority government of Prime Minister Joe Clark which was elected in 1979 but lost power the next year.

In September 1979, Crombie, a liberal-minded reformer, as Minister of Health and Welfare under the Conservative government Prime Minister Joe Clark, issued a statement representing "current Federal Government practice and policy in the field of Indian health." Crombie declared that the "Federal Government is committed to joining with Indian representatives in a fundamental review of issues involved in Indian health when Indian representatives have developed their position, and the policy emerging from that review could supersede this policy".

In the previous year, Indian bands and organizations such as the Union of B.C. Chiefs, the Native Brotherhood and the United Native Nations had engaged in intense lobbying for the right to control delivery of health services in their own communities and for the repeal of restrictive service "guidelines introduced in September 1978, to correct abuses in health delivery, and to deal with the environmental health hazards of mercury and fluoride pollution affecting particular communities." Crombie appointed Gary Goldthorpe as commissioner of the federal inquiry (known as the Goldthorpe Inquiry) into "alleged abuses in medical care delivery at Alert Bay, British Columbia."

In 1979, Justice Thomas Berger, who headed a royal commission dealing with Indian and Inuit healthcare, recommended to Crombie that there be greater consultation with Indians and Inuit regarding the delivery of healthcare programs and that an "annual sum of $950,000 be allocated for distribution by the National Indian Brotherhood to develop health consultation structures within the national Indian community."

Crombie's successor as Liberal Minister of Health and Welfare, Monique Begin, adopted Berger's recommendations, ushering in the beginning of a change in health delivery.

=== Leadership Contestant & Minister in Mulroney Cabinet ===
Crombie stood as a candidate at the 1983 Progressive Conservative leadership convention. He was the only candidate who campaigned as a "Red Tory", drawing support mainly from moderates who opposed Clark's leadership. He finished fifth out of eight candidates on the first ballot with only 3.9% of the delegate votes, and would have been eliminated after first ballot if fellow Toronto candidate Michael Wilson, in fourth place with 4.8%, hadn't withdrawn from the race. He was eliminated on the second ballot, coming in last with only 2.3%. Despite being ideologically in tune with Clark, Crombie endorsed third place candidate John Crosbie.

After Mulroney led Conservatives to power in the 1984 election, Crombie became Minister of Indian and Northern Affairs, and later Secretary of State for Canada and Minister of Multiculturalism.

== Later career ==
=== Royal Commission on the Future of the Toronto Waterfront ===
As a minority Red Tory in an increasingly conservative Mulroney government, Crombie decided not to run in the 1988 election. He returned to local urban affairs, becoming chair of the Royal Commission on the Future of the Toronto Waterfront (1988–92), which issued ground-breaking reports (including Watershed' and Regeneration) that described new integrated approaches to sustainable planning.

Subsequent to the commission, the Provincial Government appointed Crombie as head of a provincial agency, the Waterfront Regeneration Trust Agency (1992–1995), to implement the 81 recommendations made in the final report, Regeneration. Among the recommendations was the creation of a waterfront trail. Today, the Great Lakes Waterfront Trail extends from Quebec to Sault Ste Marie along Canada's Great Lakes and the St. Lawrence River.

In 1999, Crombie founded the Waterfront Regeneration Trust Corporation to continue the work of the provincial agency. To this day, he continues to serve on the Board.

In addition to leading work on the creation of the Great Lakes Waterfront Trail, the charity manages a fund for the protection and restoration of the Rouge Valley, now part of the Rouge National Urban Park. In the 1990s, Crombie tried to find an alternative to Red Hill Creek Expressway but the Hamilton city council dismissed his compromise proposal out of hand as being insufficient.

=== Other Public Appointments and Civic Engagement ===
Crombie became the first chancellor of Ryerson University in 1994 when the then polytechnic was granted university status. He served in that role until 1999 and became Chancellor Emeritus in 2006.

Throughout the 1990s, he served in various advisory capacities to city and provincial governments relating to urban issues in the Toronto area. From 2001 to 2007, he was the President and CEO of the Canadian Urban Institute. In April 2008, the Toronto District School Board selected Crombie to negotiate a solution to keep unfunded school swimming pools open to the public.

He currently serves on the Honorary Council of the Loran Scholars Foundation and the board of the Planet in Focus Foundation.

Crombie continues to be a visible participant in Canadian public discourse. In 2014, he publicly opposed plans by the federally run Toronto Port Authority to lengthen runways at Billy Bishop Airport on the Toronto Islands that would have enabled Porter Airlines to land jet planes.

In recent years, with his Red Tory views increasingly out of sync with conservative politics, Crombie on numerous occasions has joined ex-mayoral peers further to his left (Art Eggleton, Barbara Hall, David Miller and John Sewell) in issuing open letters critical of various public policies. These include the controversial practice of police carding and Ontario Premier Doug Ford's attempts to circumvent regulatory controls on development by giving mayors overriding powers or by weakening local conservation authorities.

In 2020, Crombie and six other commissioners of the Greenbelt Council resigned in protest over an omnibus budget bill that sought to strip power from local conservation authorities in favour of ministerial authorities, opening the way for development in the greenbelt surrounding Toronto.

=== Awards and Honours ===
Crombie has been inducted into the Order of Canada as an Officer and has received Ontario's highest honour, the Order of Ontario.

In 2019, Crombie was the recipient of an Award for Excellence in the Cause of Parliamentary Democracy from the Churchill Society.

David Crombie Park sits as the centerpiece of the St Lawrence Neighbourhood in downtown Toronto, which extends from Jarvis Street to Berkeley Street in a formerly industrial area that was converted to housing.

== Personal life ==
Crombie is the father of two daughters, Robin and Carrie, and actor Jonathan Crombie, who starred in three Anne of Green Gables TV series. Jonathan died in New York on April 15, 2015, of a brain hemorrhage at age 48. His organs were donated, he was cremated and his ashes returned to Canada.

== Notes ==
Academic offices
New office	Chancellor of the Ryerson University; 1994–1999	Succeeded by John Craig Eaton
