= Paul McCrossan =

Canadian politician

William Paul Joseph McCrossan

Member of Parliament for York—Scarborough (2nd time)
- In office 1984–1988
- Preceded by: Paul Cosgrove
- Succeeded by: Jim Karygiannis

Member of Parliament for York—Scarborough (1st time)
- In office 1978–1980
- Preceded by: Robert Stanbury
- Succeeded by: Paul Cosgrove

Personal details
- Born: May 20, 1942 (age 83) Toronto, Ontario, Canada
- Party: Progressive Conservative
- Profession: Actuary

William Paul Joseph McCrossan (born May 20, 1942) is a Canadian actuary and former Member of Parliament.

== Background ==
McCrossan was born in Toronto. An actuary by profession, McCrossan has served as president of the Canadian Institute of Actuaries. He was employed by Canada Life Assurance prior to being elected to the House of Commons.

== Politics ==
He represented the riding of York—Scarborough as a Progressive Conservative from 1978, when he was elected in a by-election until his defeat in the 1980 general election. As an MP, he introduced a private member's bill, Bill C-255, the Public Pensions Reporting Act, which passed unanimously. He also supported the passage of the Non-smokers' Rights Act, which was introduced by a New Democratic Party member of parliament, Lynn McDonald.

He was re-elected in the 1984 election, defeating future Toronto mayor June Rowlands, but lost to Liberal Jim Karygiannis in the redistributed riding of Scarborough—Agincourt in the 1988 election.

He attempted to return to politics in the riding of Scarborough East in the 2000 federal election but was defeated.

== Later life ==
From 1995 to 1996, he was president of the International Actuarial Association. In 2001, he was named to the Standards Advisory Council of the International Accounting Standards Committee. He was a consulting actuary and partner at Eckler Partners Ltd., now known as Eckler Ltd. He served on the advisory committee for Sir Derek Morris's review of the actuarial profession in the United Kingdom, known as the Morris Review.

In 2010, McCrossan was named to the New Brunswick Task Force on Protecting Pensions.

== Electoral record ==
By-election: On Mr. Stanbury's resignation, 16 October 1978: York—Scarborough
Party	Candidate	Votes	%	±%
Progressive Conservative	Paul McCrossan	55,455		
Liberal	Paul Cosgrove	21,431		
New Democratic	Ivan H. Jones	7,681		
No affiliation	Anne C. McBride	564		
Independent	Nick Moldovanyi	348		

1979 Canadian federal election: York—Scarborough
Party	Candidate	Votes	%	±%
Progressive Conservative	Paul McCrossan	36,718		
Liberal	Paul Cosgrove	32,699		
New Democratic	Frank Lowery	10,978		
Libertarian	Mathias Blecker	480		
Independent	Anne C. McBride	242		
Marxist–Leninist	Richard Pringle	97		

1980 Canadian federal election: York—Scarborough
Party	Candidate	Votes	%	±%
Liberal	Paul Cosgrove	39,208		
Progressive Conservative	Paul McCrossan	30,925		
New Democratic	Vinc Overend	10,939		
Independent	Anne C. McBride	384		
Libertarian	Andrew Siks	308		
Marxist–Leninist	Roger Carter	75		

1984 Canadian federal election: York—Scarborough
Party	Candidate	Votes	%	±%
Progressive Conservative	Paul McCrossan	48,809		
Liberal	June Rowlands	35,869		
New Democratic	Yvonne Bondarchuk	13,260		
Libertarian	George Dance	1,067		
Independent	Anne C. McBride	704		
Independent	Dona Cauchon	666		

1988 Canadian federal election: Scarborough—Agincourt
Party	Candidate	Votes	%
Liberal	Jim Karygiannis	19,459	44.3
Progressive Conservative	W. Paul McCrossan	18,601	42.4
New Democratic	Susie Vallance	5,082	11.6
Independent	Anne C. McBride	442	1.0
Libertarian	B.D.G. Antrobus	328	0.7
Total valid votes		43,912	

2000 Canadian federal election: Scarborough East
Party	Candidate	Votes	%	Expenditures
Liberal	John McKay	24,019	59.82	$37,639
Alliance	Paul Calandra	7,559	18.83	$32,135
Progressive Conservative	Paul McCrossan	6,284	15.65	$26,016
New Democratic	Denise Lake	1,884	4.69	$4,973
Canadian Action	Dave Glover	292	0.73	none listed
Marxist–Leninist	France Tremblay	113	0.28	$8
Total valid votes		40,151	100.00	
Total rejected ballots		155		
Turnout		40,306	55.91	
Electors on the lists		72,092		
Sources: Official Results, Elections Canada and Financial Returns, Elections Canada.
