= Fonse Faour =

Canadian politician (born 1951)

Fonse Faour MP

Leader of the New Democratic Party of Newfoundland
- In office November 10, 1980 – November 9, 1981
- Preceded by: John Greene
- Succeeded by: Peter Fenwick

Member of Parliament for Humber—St. George's—St. Barbe
- In office October 16, 1978 – February 19, 1980
- Preceded by: Jack Marshall
- Succeeded by: Brian Tobin

Personal details
- Born: Alphonsus Faour; November 16, 1951 (age 74) Corner Brook, Newfoundland, Canada
- Party: New Democratic
- Occupation: Lawyer

Alphonsus "Fonse" Faour (born November 16, 1951) is a Canadian lawyer and former politician. Faour represented the electoral district of Humber—St. George's—St. Barbe, which he won in a 1978 by-election following the resignation of Jack Marshall. In the general election the following year, Faour retained the renamed seat of Humber—Port au Port—St. Barbe. However, in the 1980 election, Faour was defeated by Brian Tobin.

After the election, he became leader of the Newfoundland and Labrador New Democratic Party from 1980 to 1981. He resigned due to difficulties in concurrently maintaining his law practice and leading the party without a seat in the legislature.

In 2003, Faour was appointed to the trial division of the Supreme Court of Newfoundland and Labrador.

== Archives ==
There is an Alphonsus Faour fonds at Library and Archives Canada. Archival reference number is R3766.

Parliament of Canada
Preceded by Jack Marshall	Member of Parliament for Humber—St. George's—St. Barbe; 1978–1979	Succeeded by last member, riding abolished
Preceded by first member	Member of Parliament for Humber—Port au Port—St. Barbe; 1979–1980	Succeeded by Brian Tobin
Political offices
Preceded by John Greene	Leader of the Newfoundland and Labrador New Democratic Party; 1980–1981	Succeeded by Peter Fenwick
