= Humber—St. George's—St. Barbe =

Former federal electoral district in Newfoundland and Labrador, Canada

Newfoundland and Labrador electoral district
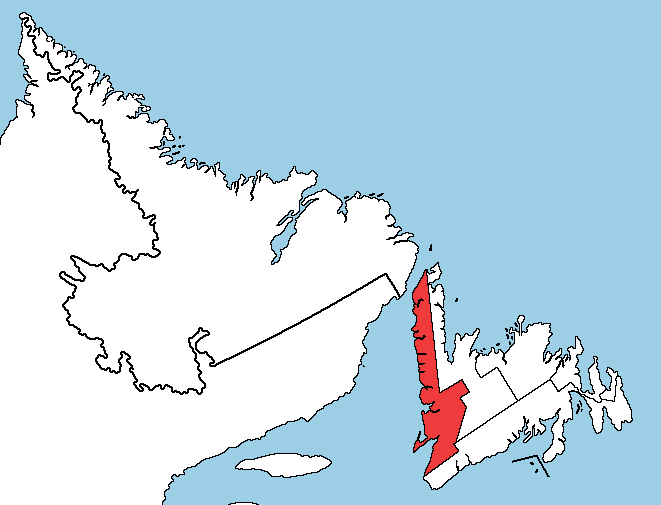
- A map of Humber—St. George's—St. Barbe in the 1966 representation order

Defunct federal electoral district
- Legislature: House of Commons
- District created: 1966
- District abolished: 1976
- First contested: 1968
- Last contested: 1978 by-election

Humber—St. George's—St. Barbe was a federal electoral district in Newfoundland and Labrador, Canada, that was represented in the House of Commons of Canada from 1968 to 1979. This riding was created in 1966 from parts of Grand Falls—White Bay—Labrador and Humber—St. George's ridings. It was abolished in 1976 when it was redistributed into Burin—St. George's and Humber—St. Barbe ridings.

The riding initially consisted of the provincial districts of Port au Port, Humber East, Humber West, St. Barbe South and St. Barbe North, and that part of the provincial district of St. George's not included in the electoral district of Burin-Burgeo.

== Members of Parliament ==
This riding elected the following members of Parliament:

Parliament	Years	Member	Party
Humber—St. George's—St. Barbe; Riding created from Humber—St. George's and Grand Falls—White Bay—Labrador
21st	1968–1972	Jack Marshall	Progressive Conservative
22nd	1972–1974	Jack Marshall	Progressive Conservative
23rd	1974–1978	Jack Marshall	Progressive Conservative
23rd	1978–1979	Fonse Faour	New Democratic
Riding dissolved into Humber—St. Barbe and Burin—St. George's

== Election results ==
1968 Canadian federal election
Party	Candidate	Votes
Progressive Conservative	Jack Marshall	9,765
Liberal	Herman Maxwell Batten	9,482
New Democratic	Calvin Morris Hillyard	3,276

1972 Canadian federal election
Party	Candidate	Votes
Progressive Conservative	Jack Marshall	16,378
Liberal	G.C. Meech Matthews	10,200
New Democratic	Calvin Morris Hillyard	1,666

1974 Canadian federal election
Party	Candidate	Votes
Progressive Conservative	Jack Marshall	16,500
Liberal	Jim Campbell	10,049
New Democratic	Ann Robbins	1,279

By-election on 16 October 1978 On Mr. Marshall's resignation, 23 March 1978
Party	Candidate	Votes
New Democratic	Fonse Faour	12,386
Liberal	George Billard	10,322
Progressive Conservative	Bill Brown	5,851

== See also ==
- List of Canadian electoral districts
- Historical federal electoral districts of Canada
