= Jack Marshall (Canadian politician) =

Canadian politician

Jack Marshall CM CD (November 26, 1919 – August 17, 2004) was a Canadian politician. He represented the electoral district of Humber—St. George's—St. Barbe in the House of Commons of Canada from 1968 to 1978 and served in the Senate of Canada from 1978 to 1994.

== History ==
Born in Glace Bay, Nova Scotia, he was the only officer cadet in the Canadian Army who went ashore at the start of the Battle of Normandy with the 3rd Canadian Division. He served in the North Shore New Brunswick Regiment and would end the war with the rank of captain. After the war he moved to Corner Brook, Newfoundland where he served with Royal Newfoundland Regiment becoming Colonel and commanding officer for the whole province.

After retiring from the military, Marshall managed a drug store in Corner Brook before being elected to parliament in the 1968 federal election.

A member of the Progressive Conservative Party of Canada, he was appointed to the Senate of Canada in 1978 by Prime Minister Pierre Trudeau and served until 1994. He also served as the Honorary Lieutenant Colonel of the 2nd Battalion, Royal Newfoundland Regiment.

In 1995, he was made a Member of the Order of Canada for his work on Veteran's Affairs. Among his many contributions to Canadian Veterans, he was instrumental in establishing war pensions for members of the Canadian Merchant Navy and in 1994 he led the 50th Anniversary of the D-Day "Canada Remembers" commemoration.

Marshall's son, Tom Marshall was the 11th Premier of Newfoundland and Labrador, and was MHA for the district of Humber East and Minister of Finance in the province of Newfoundland and Labrador.

Marshall was married twice, first to Sylvia (died 1975) then to Evelyn Addison White in 1981. He had three children, Tom, Beverlee and Arlaine.

There is a Jack Marshall fonds at Library and Archives Canada.

Parliament of Canada
Preceded by first member, riding created in 1966	Member of Parliament for Humber—St. George's—St. Barbe; 1968–1978	Succeeded by Fonse Faour
