= Albanie Morin =

Canadian politician

Member of Parliament for Louis-Hébert
- In office 1972 – September 30, 1976
- Preceded by: Jean-Charles Cantin
- Succeeded by: Dennis Dawson

Personal details
- Born: April 30, 1921 St. Elizabeth, Manitoba, Canada
- Died: September 30, 1976 (aged 55)
- Party: Liberal
- Occupation: Professor

Albanie Morin (April 30, 1921 – September 30, 1976) was a Canadian politician, who represented the electoral district of Louis-Hébert in the House of Commons of Canada from 1972 to 1976. Morin, Monique Bégin and Jeanne Sauvé, all elected in 1972, were the first women ever elected to the House of Commons from Quebec.

A member of the Liberal Party, Morin first won the seat in the 1972 election, and was reelected in 1974. She was a deputy speaker and, in 1974, became the first woman to preside over a sitting of the House of Commons.

Morin died on September 30, 1976, at the age of 55. She was succeeded by Dennis Dawson in a by-election held on May 24, 1977.
