= Robert Stanbury =

Canadian politician

The Honourable Robert Stanbury PC QC
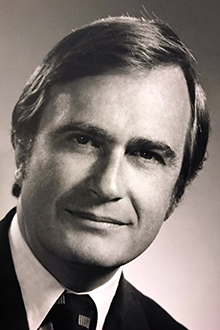

Member of Parliament for York—Scarborough
- In office 1965–1978
- Preceded by: Maurice Moreau
- Succeeded by: Paul McCrossan

Personal details
- Born: Robert Douglas George Stanbury; October 26, 1929 Exeter, Ontario, Canada
- Died: February 10, 2017 (aged 87) Burlington, Ontario, Canada
- Party: Liberal
- Spouse: Miriam Rose Voelker
- Relations: Richard Stanbury, brother
- Children: 4
- Profession: Lawyer

Robert Douglas George Stanbury, PC QC (October 26, 1929 - February 10, 2017) was a Canadian public servant, lawyer and former politician, journalist and corporate executive.

== Background ==
Stanbury was born in Exeter, Ontario, on October 26, 1929. His father was a country lawyer who was keen on politics. He was educated at St. Catharines Collegiate Institute and the University of Western Ontario, where he was a member of Kappa Alpha Society, before obtaining a law degree at Osgoode Hall Law School. He began practicing law in North York and in 1961 was elected to the North York School Board. In 1963 he became chair of the board. Trustees at the time were unpaid so he resigned in 1964 to pay more attention to his family and his law practice. He married Miriam Rose Voelker and together they raised four children.

== Politics ==
Stanbury was elected to the House of Commons of Canada in the 1965 election as the Liberal Member of Parliament for York—Scarborough. After being re-elected in the 1968 election, Stanbury was, in 1969, appointed by Prime Minister Pierre Trudeau to the Cabinet as minister without portfolio with responsibilities for citizenship and information.

In 1971, he was promoted to Minister of Communications. In 1972 he became Minister of National Revenue. He also served as a Canadian delegate to three United Nations General Assemblies.

He was re-elected in the 1974 election, but was dropped from Cabinet in the post-election cabinet shuffle. He retired from office in 1977 in order to pursue private business interests.

== Later life ==
He retired from parliament in order to become an executive at Firestone Canada. He served as chair and chief executive officer from 1983 to 1985.

Stanbury was a lawyer in the Hamilton, Ontario, firm of Inch, Easterbrook and Shaker. He chaired the Ontario panel of the Canadian Broadcast Standards Council, and was past chair of the Employers’ Council of Ontario. He was a member of the Council of Canadian Administrative Tribunals and the International Commission of Jurists.

He served as president of the Canadian Council for Native Business, a private sector charitable organization linking aspiring aboriginal entrepreneurs and managers with established businesses and financial institution. He had a long-standing interest in Canada's north and served as a founding member of the Nunavut Arbitration Board, which is empowered to resolve disputes arising out of the Nunavut Land Claims Agreement, and as the territory's Integrity Commissioner.

Stanbury died in Burlington, Ontario, on February 10, 2017, at the age of 87.
