= Results breakdown of the 1984 Canadian federal election =

1984 election for members of the Canadian Parliament's House of Commons

1984 Canadian federal election
- September 4, 1984
- All 282 seats in the House of Commons of Canada; 142 seats needed for a majority
- Turnout: 75.3%
Party	Leader	Vote %	Seats	+/–
Progressive Conservative	Brian Mulroney	50.03%	211	+108
Liberal	John Turner	28.02%	40	−107
New Democratic	Ed Broadbent	18.81%	30	−2
This lists parties that won seats. See the complete results below.
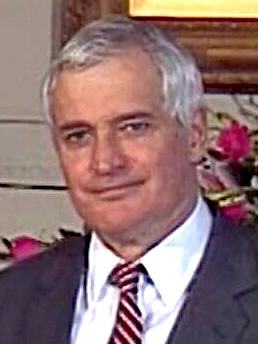

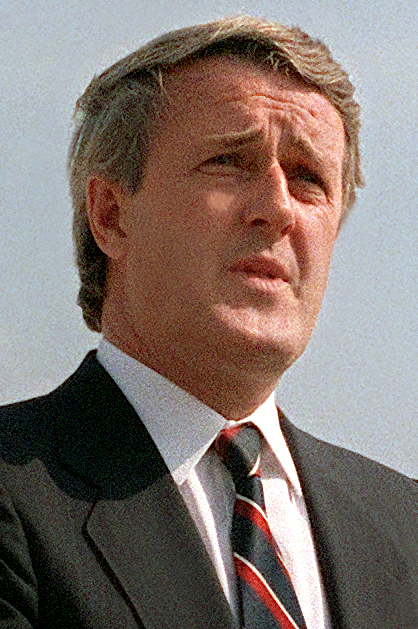
Prime Minister before	Prime Minister after
John Turner; Liberal	Brian Mulroney; Progressive Conservative

The 1984 Canadian federal election was held on September 4, 1984, to elect members to the House of Commons of the 33rd Parliament of Canada.

Winning the most seats in Canadian political history, the Progressive Conservative Party (PC Party), led by Brian Mulroney, defeated the incumbent governing Liberal Party led by Prime Minister John Turner. This was the first election since 1958 in which the PC Party won a majority government and is also the only time since 1958 that Canada's governing party received an actual majority of votes cast.

The Liberals suffered the worst defeat of a sitting government in Canadian history since 1935, with their seat count falling to 40. That would be their smallest ever until their 34 seats in 2011. They won only two seats west of Ontario: John Turner in Vancouver Quadra for a gain, and Lloyd Axworthy holding on in Winnipeg—Fort Garry. The remainder would be concentrated around Montreal and Metro Toronto. The collapse of Liberal support in Quebec was staggering: since 1896, with the exception of 1958, they had always won the most seats in that province. After 1984, they would not attain that again until 2015 (but they won the Quebec popular vote in 2000).

This election also saw the collapse of Social Credit, which failed to even obtain a third-place result in the ridings it contested, receiving less support than the Rhinoceros Party. The Parti nationaliste du Québec received more support than its predecessor, the Union populaire, and even attained a third-place result in Matapédia—Matane.

The Confederation of Regions Party appeared for the first time, receiving several second-place results out West. The Green Party also made its first appearance, fielding candidates mainly in Ontario, Alberta and British Columbia.

== Results analysis ==
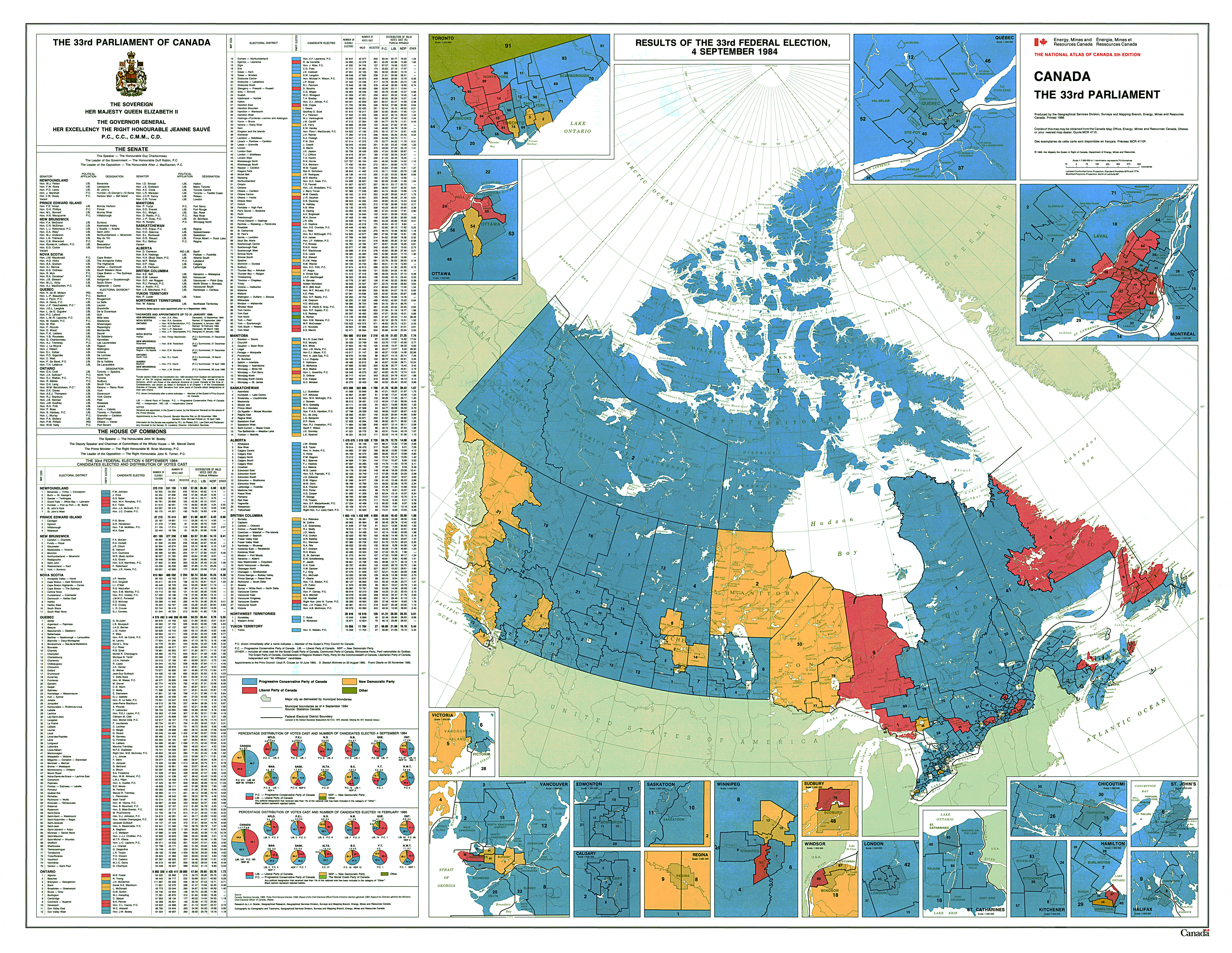
Map of Canada, showing the results of the 1984 election by riding.

Change in popular vote by party (1984 vs 1980)
Party	1984	1980	Change (pp)
█ Progressive Conservative	50.03%	32.44%	17.59
█ Liberal	28.02%	44.34%	-16.31
█ New Democratic	18.81%	19.77%	-0.96
█ Social Credit	0.13%	1.69%	-1.56
█ Rhinoceros	0.79%	1.01%	-0.22
█ Parti nationaliste	0.68%	0.13%	0.55
█ Confederation of Regions	0.52%	0%	0.52
█ Other	1.02%	0.62%	0.40

Party candidates in 2nd place
Party in 1st place	1984					1980					
Party in 1st place	Party in 2nd place				Total	Party in 2nd place (Note: Liberals and PCs tied for second place in Beaches.)					Total
Party in 1st place	PC	Lib	NDP	CoR	Total	PC	Lib	NDP	SC	Rhino	Total
Progressive Conservative		154	54	3	211		81	22			103
Liberal	35		5		40	77		60	8	2	147
New Democratic	26	4			30	23	10				33
Independent	1				1						–
Total	62	158	59	3	282	100	91	82	8	2	283

Principal races, according to 1st and 2nd-place results
Parties		Seats
█ Progressive Conservative	█ Liberal	189
█ Progressive Conservative	█ New Democratic	80
█ Progressive Conservative	█ Confederation of Regions	3
█ Liberal	█ New Democratic	9
█ Independent	█ Progressive Conservative	1
Total		282

Party rankings (1st to 5th place)
Party	1984					1980				
Party	1st	2nd	3rd	4th	5th	1st	2nd	3rd	4th	5th
Progressive Conservative	211	62	9			103	100	74	5	
Liberal	40	158	82	2		147	91	44		
New Democratic	30	59	189	4		32	82	157	6	3
Independent	1			46	16				33	24
Confederation of Regions		3		33	8					
Rhinoceros			1	65	21		2	1	82	30
Parti nationaliste			1	28	44				6	5
Green				39	11					
Libertarian				28	29				37	17
Commonwealth of Canada				3	10					
Social Credit				4	16		8	5	35	51
Communist				1	14			14	16	6
Marxist–Leninist									27	52

== Synopsis of results ==
1984 Canadian federal election – synopsis of riding results
Electoral district		Winning party								Votes (Note: Sorted in order of national vote share. Minor political parties without a candidate receiving at least 1,000 votes are grouped under Other.)											
Province	Name	1980	1st place	Votes	Share	Margin #	Margin %	2nd place	3rd place	PC	Lib	NDP	Rhino	PNQ	CoR	Green	Ltn	SC	Ind	Other	Total
AB	Athabasca	PC	PC	23,997	68.31%	17,996	51.23%	NDP	Lib	23,997	4,222	6,001	–	–	578	–	–	332	–	–	35,130
AB	Bow River	PC	PC	43,033	76.20%	37,775	66.89%	NDP	Lib	43,033	4,066	5,258	2,349	–	1,443	–	–	326	–	–	56,475
AB	Calgary Centre	PC	PC	24,924	66.35%	18,969	50.50%	Lib	NDP	24,924	5,955	5,138	–	–	604	761	180	–	–	–	37,562
AB	Calgary East	PC	PC	36,825	58.85%	22,076	35.28%	Lib	NDP	36,825	14,749	8,558	–	–	658	–	324	343	993	122	62,572
AB	Calgary North	PC	PC	39,207	72.79%	32,180	59.74%	NDP	Lib	39,207	6,864	7,027	–	–	–	–	–	–	765	–	53,863
AB	Calgary South	PC	PC	55,590	77.91%	47,763	66.94%	Lib	NDP	55,590	7,827	6,135	–	–	866	–	–	–	800	136	71,354
AB	Calgary West	PC	PC	37,565	74.70%	31,816	63.27%	Lib	NDP	37,565	5,749	5,409	–	–	523	605	233	201	–	–	50,285
AB	Crowfoot	PC	PC	26,291	77.83%	23,138	68.50%	NDP	Lib	26,291	2,483	3,153	–	–	1,559	–	–	294	–	–	33,780
AB	Edmonton East	PC	PC	16,119	48.48%	8,451	25.42%	NDP	Lib	16,119	6,002	7,668	–	–	241	233	–	–	2,857	128	33,248
AB	Edmonton North	PC	PC	29,074	57.29%	16,769	33.04%	NDP	Lib	29,074	8,311	12,305	–	–	520	–	–	345	–	194	50,749
AB	Edmonton South	PC	PC	32,510	62.46%	23,103	44.39%	NDP	Lib	32,510	8,259	9,407	536	–	579	503	–	252	–	–	52,046
AB	Edmonton West	PC	PC	25,764	58.82%	16,091	36.74%	Lib	NDP	25,764	9,673	7,339	–	–	697	326	–	–	–	–	43,799
AB	Edmonton—Strathcona	PC	PC	33,712	61.43%	22,617	41.21%	NDP	Lib	33,712	8,500	11,095	–	–	749	466	–	218	–	137	54,877
AB	Lethbridge—Foothills	PC	PC	31,316	67.38%	24,494	52.70%	NDP	Lib	31,316	5,315	6,822	–	–	426	–	–	456	2,145	–	46,480
AB	Medicine Hat	PC	PC	33,978	75.75%	29,326	65.38%	NDP	Lib	33,978	4,025	4,652	–	–	1,427	–	–	772	–	–	44,854
AB	Peace River	PC	PC	25,648	62.24%	19,315	46.87%	NDP	Lib	25,648	5,419	6,333	–	–	2,877	578	–	354	–	–	41,209
AB	Pembina	PC	PC	44,026	70.57%	34,234	54.87%	NDP	Lib	44,026	7,228	9,792	–	–	1,215	–	–	–	–	127	62,388
AB	Red Deer	PC	PC	41,695	75.43%	36,494	66.02%	NDP	Lib	41,695	5,195	5,201	–	–	2,494	–	–	691	–	–	55,276
AB	Vegreville	PC	PC	32,480	80.20%	28,687	70.84%	NDP	Lib	32,480	2,775	3,793	347	–	537	–	–	372	–	194	40,498
AB	Wetaskiwin	PC	PC	30,128	70.93%	24,532	57.76%	NDP	Lib	30,128	3,231	5,596	–	–	3,063	–	–	456	–	–	42,474
AB	Yellowhead	PC	PC	37,462	74.01%	30,556	60.36%	NDP	Lib	37,462	4,097	6,906	773	–	829	–	–	553	–	–	50,620
BC	Burnaby	NDP	NDP	28,318	48.00%	7,621	12.92%	PC	Lib	20,697	9,612	28,318	–	–	–	364	–	–	–	–	58,991
BC	Capilano	PC	PC	28,616	56.45%	15,041	29.67%	Lib	NDP	28,616	13,575	6,310	603	–	–	747	190	–	653	–	50,694
BC	Cariboo—Chilcotin	PC	PC	20,553	54.51%	9,009	23.89%	NDP	Lib	20,553	4,881	11,544	–	–	–	392	–	335	–	–	37,705
BC	Comox—Powell River	NDP	NDP	27,288	44.61%	722	1.18%	PC	Lib	26,566	5,790	27,288	–	–	452	505	–	357	–	215	61,173
BC	Cowichan—Malahat—The Islands	NDP	NDP	24,555	45.06%	1,591	2.92%	PC	Lib	22,964	5,899	24,555	–	–	257	387	313	–	123	–	54,498
BC	Esquimalt—Saanich	PC	PC	31,766	48.28%	8,672	13.18%	NDP	Lib	31,766	9,516	23,094	–	–	304	547	163	306	–	94	65,790
BC	Fraser Valley East	PC	PC	32,073	59.92%	19,294	36.04%	NDP	Lib	32,073	7,942	12,779	–	–	–	–	735	–	–	–	53,529
BC	Fraser Valley West	PC	PC	35,984	54.72%	16,106	24.49%	NDP	Lib	35,984	8,349	19,878	474	–	180	277	420	–	94	103	65,759
BC	Kamloops—Shuswap	NDP	NDP	30,512	54.08%	10,012	17.74%	PC	Lib	20,500	4,675	30,512	353	–	102	216	–	–	65	–	56,423
BC	Kootenay East—Revelstoke	NDP	PC	18,129	46.49%	2,221	5.70%	NDP	Lib	18,129	4,477	15,908	–	–	–	–	–	–	479	–	38,993
BC	Kootenay West	NDP	PC	15,804	47.43%	744	2.23%	NDP	Lib	15,804	2,460	15,060	–	–	–	–	–	–	–	–	33,324
BC	Mission—Port Moody	NDP	PC	30,678	47.53%	4,753	7.36%	NDP	Lib	30,678	7,071	25,925	–	–	–	540	–	327	–	–	64,541
BC	Nanaimo—Alberni	NDP	PC	27,410	45.81%	1,751	2.93%	NDP	Lib	27,410	5,922	25,659	–	–	–	529	–	–	83	231	59,834
BC	New Westminster—Coquitlam	NDP	NDP	21,134	46.18%	2,843	6.21%	PC	Lib	18,291	5,816	21,134	395	–	–	–	–	–	–	133	45,769
BC	North Vancouver—Burnaby	PC	PC	21,750	43.63%	7,429	14.90%	Lib	NDP	21,750	14,321	12,812	383	–	60	217	174	–	48	89	49,854
BC	Okanagan North	PC	PC	35,904	56.07%	18,736	29.26%	NDP	Lib	35,904	9,935	17,168	–	–	–	–	–	1,025	–	–	64,032
BC	Okanagan—Similkameen	PC	PC	27,071	52.21%	11,890	22.93%	NDP	Lib	27,071	8,106	15,181	–	–	672	417	–	402	–	–	51,849
BC	Prince George—Bulkley Valley	PC	PC	18,897	49.29%	5,623	14.67%	NDP	Lib	18,897	5,121	13,274	401	–	–	–	478	–	168	–	38,339
BC	Prince George—Peace River	PC	PC	21,154	62.44%	12,986	38.33%	NDP	Lib	21,154	3,368	8,168	385	–	335	–	127	342	–	–	33,879
BC	Richmond—South Delta	PC	PC	38,168	55.40%	21,791	31.63%	NDP	Lib	38,168	13,340	16,377	–	–	273	433	–	–	301	–	68,892
BC	Skeena	NDP	NDP	14,174	45.79%	2,965	9.58%	PC	Lib	11,209	5,130	14,174	443	–	–	–	–	–	–	–	30,956
BC	Surrey—White Rock—North Delta	PC	PC	39,544	53.58%	16,989	23.02%	NDP	Lib	39,544	10,747	22,555	481	–	–	315	–	–	–	155	73,797
BC	Vancouver Centre	PC	PC	21,704	43.23%	5,421	10.80%	NDP	Lib	21,704	10,654	16,283	487	–	98	533	316	–	–	135	50,210
BC	Vancouver East	NDP	NDP	18,464	51.79%	9,420	26.42%	Lib	PC	7,210	9,044	18,464	342	–	–	–	330	–	–	259	35,649
BC	Vancouver Kingsway	NDP	NDP	20,179	51.10%	8,539	21.62%	Lib	PC	7,152	11,640	20,179	–	–	–	305	–	–	–	214	39,490
BC	Vancouver Quadra	PC	Lib	21,794	43.94%	3,213	6.48%	PC	NDP	18,581	21,794	8,343	219	–	–	389	87	–	171	20	49,604
BC	Vancouver South	PC	PC	25,469	54.87%	14,560	31.37%	NDP	Lib	25,469	9,507	10,909	–	–	–	529	–	–	–	–	46,414
BC	Victoria	PC	PC	24,588	46.34%	4,108	7.74%	NDP	Lib	24,588	6,702	20,480	262	–	162	575	187	–	104	–	53,060
MB	Brandon—Souris	PC	PC	18,813	52.19%	12,491	34.65%	CoR	NDP	18,813	5,278	5,631	–	–	6,322	–	–	–	–	–	36,044
MB	Churchill	NDP	NDP	10,829	45.56%	2,819	11.86%	PC	Lib	8,010	4,272	10,829	–	–	–	–	281	–	377	–	23,769
MB	Dauphin-Swan River	NDP	PC	11,973	42.56%	1,754	6.23%	NDP	Lib	11,973	4,352	10,219	–	–	1,589	–	–	–	–	–	28,133
MB	Lisgar	PC	PC	15,557	49.47%	6,581	20.93%	CoR	Lib	15,557	4,423	2,052	437	–	8,976	–	–	–	–	–	31,445
MB	Portage—Marquette	PC	PC	15,378	49.37%	8,421	27.04%	CoR	NDP	15,378	4,161	4,447	–	–	6,957	–	204	–	–	–	31,147
MB	Provencher	PC	PC	20,077	58.27%	13,136	38.12%	NDP	Lib	20,077	4,859	6,941	–	–	2,347	–	232	–	–	–	34,456
MB	Selkirk—Interlake	NDP	PC	13,750	40.67%	662	1.96%	NDP	Lib	13,750	3,510	13,088	–	–	3,301	–	163	–	–	–	33,812
MB	St. Boniface	Lib	PC	19,548	39.70%	2,785	5.66%	Lib	NDP	19,548	16,763	11,279	–	–	1,649	–	–	–	–	–	49,239
MB	Winnipeg North	NDP	NDP	18,209	43.31%	5,504	13.09%	PC	Lib	12,705	10,421	18,209	–	–	–	–	–	–	423	283	42,041
MB	Winnipeg North Centre	NDP	NDP	10,559	46.13%	4,089	17.86%	PC	Lib	6,470	5,144	10,559	–	–	–	–	–	–	718	–	22,891
MB	Winnipeg—Assiniboine	PC	PC	27,567	52.36%	11,367	21.59%	Lib	NDP	27,567	16,200	7,067	–	–	1,344	–	472	–	–	–	52,650
MB	Winnipeg—Birds Hill	NDP	NDP	23,903	45.81%	3,259	6.25%	PC	Lib	20,644	5,447	23,903	569	–	1,069	–	–	–	549	–	52,181
MB	Winnipeg—Fort Garry	Lib	Lib	21,286	45.70%	2,354	5.05%	PC	NDP	18,932	21,286	5,932	–	–	–	–	308	–	–	115	46,573
MB	Winnipeg—St. James	NDP	PC	12,523	42.52%	2,680	9.10%	NDP	Lib	12,523	6,007	9,843	–	–	830	–	164	–	–	86	29,453
NB	Carleton—Charlotte	PC	PC	19,984	61.79%	12,232	37.82%	Lib	NDP	19,984	7,752	4,608	–	–	–	–	–	–	–	–	32,344
NB	Fundy—Royal	PC	PC	26,021	56.58%	14,539	31.61%	Lib	NDP	26,021	11,482	8,487	–	–	–	–	–	–	–	–	45,990
NB	Gloucester	Lib	PC	23,524	55.12%	7,146	16.75%	Lib	NDP	23,524	16,378	2,188	–	–	–	–	–	–	584	–	42,674
NB	Madawaska—Victoria	Lib	PC	16,411	51.89%	3,166	10.01%	Lib	NDP	16,411	13,245	1,968	–	–	–	–	–	–	–	–	31,624
NB	Moncton	Lib	PC	29,936	57.17%	15,379	29.37%	Lib	NDP	29,936	14,557	7,629	–	–	–	–	–	–	243	–	52,365
NB	Northumberland—Miramichi	Lib	PC	17,134	53.94%	5,163	16.25%	Lib	NDP	17,134	11,971	2,660	–	–	–	–	–	–	–	–	31,765
NB	Restigouche	Lib	PC	14,089	45.65%	1,839	5.96%	Lib	NDP	14,089	12,250	4,526	–	–	–	–	–	–	–	–	30,865
NB	Saint John	Lib	PC	16,604	52.20%	8,495	26.71%	Lib	NDP	16,604	8,109	6,752	–	–	–	–	242	102	–	–	31,809
NB	Westmorland—Kent	Lib	Lib	14,709	41.75%	1,338	3.80%	PC	NDP	13,371	14,709	7,148	–	–	–	–	–	–	–	–	35,228
NB	York—Sunbury	PC	PC	25,190	58.85%	15,317	35.78%	Lib	NDP	25,190	9,873	7,366	–	–	–	–	–	–	377	–	42,806
NL	Bonavista—Trinity—Conception	Lib	PC	19,015	55.04%	4,912	14.22%	Lib	NDP	19,015	14,103	1,432	–	–	–	–	–	–	–	–	34,550
NL	Burin—St. George's	Lib	PC	13,184	47.36%	299	1.07%	Lib	NDP	13,184	12,885	1,767	–	–	–	–	–	–	–	–	27,836
NL	Gander—Twillingate	Lib	Lib	16,100	53.11%	3,024	9.98%	PC	NDP	13,076	16,100	1,138	–	–	–	–	–	–	–	–	30,314
NL	Grand Falls—White Bay—Labrador	Lib	Lib	12,938	45.13%	824	2.87%	PC	NDP	12,114	12,938	3,616	–	–	–	–	–	–	–	–	28,668
NL	Humber—Port au Port—St. Barbe	Lib	Lib	17,409	48.29%	493	1.37%	PC	NDP	16,916	17,409	1,530	–	–	–	–	–	–	196	–	36,051
NL	St. John's East	PC	PC	30,866	78.30%	25,222	63.98%	Lib	NDP	30,866	5,644	2,584	–	–	–	–	325	–	–	–	39,419
NL	St. John's West	PC	PC	33,696	76.03%	24,997	56.40%	Lib	NDP	33,696	8,699	1,926	–	–	–	–	–	–	–	–	44,321
NS	Annapolis Valley—Hants	PC	PC	23,580	53.85%	11,117	25.39%	Lib	NDP	23,580	12,463	6,987	762	–	–	–	–	–	–	–	43,792
NS	Cape Breton Highlands—Canso	Lib	PC	19,371	50.05%	4,345	11.23%	Lib	NDP	19,371	15,026	4,308	–	–	–	–	–	–	–	–	38,705
NS	Cape Breton—East Richmond	Lib	Lib	20,270	55.81%	8,374	23.06%	PC	NDP	11,896	20,270	3,709	444	–	–	–	–	–	–	–	36,319
NS	Cape Breton—The Sydneys	Lib	Lib	16,051	44.12%	2,393	6.58%	PC	NDP	13,658	16,051	6,673	–	–	–	–	–	–	–	–	36,382
NS	Central Nova	PC	PC	21,462	61.00%	12,314	35.00%	Lib	NDP	21,462	9,148	4,572	–	–	–	–	–	–	–	–	35,182
NS	Cumberland—Colchester	PC	PC	24,180	57.30%	11,691	27.71%	Lib	NDP	24,180	12,489	5,527	–	–	–	–	–	–	–	–	42,196
NS	Dartmouth—Halifax East	PC	PC	27,549	54.95%	14,465	28.85%	Lib	NDP	27,549	13,084	9,503	–	–	–	–	–	–	–	–	50,136
NS	Halifax	Lib	PC	18,779	44.78%	4,368	10.41%	Lib	NDP	18,779	14,411	8,576	–	–	–	–	–	–	174	–	41,940
NS	Halifax West	PC	PC	30,287	54.28%	16,758	30.03%	Lib	NDP	30,287	13,529	11,626	–	–	–	–	–	–	355	–	55,797
NS	South Shore	PC	PC	22,347	56.69%	10,908	27.67%	Lib	NDP	22,347	11,439	5,633	–	–	–	–	–	–	–	–	39,419
NS	South West Nova	Lib	PC	20,604	50.59%	3,560	8.74%	Lib	NDP	20,604	17,044	3,076	–	–	–	–	–	–	–	–	40,724
ON	Algoma	Lib	Lib	14,113	38.26%	1,302	3.53%	PC	NDP	12,811	14,113	9,499	–	–	–	–	–	–	462	–	36,885
ON	Beaches	NDP	NDP	14,914	40.62%	2,471	6.73%	PC	Lib	12,443	8,155	14,914	–	–	–	581	353	–	244	27	36,717
ON	Brampton—Georgetown	PC	PC	47,743	56.15%	24,418	28.72%	Lib	NDP	47,743	23,325	13,356	–	–	–	458	–	–	–	153	85,035
ON	Brant	NDP	NDP	23,103	44.20%	1,424	2.72%	PC	Lib	21,679	7,286	23,103	–	–	–	–	–	207	–	–	52,275
ON	Broadview—Greenwood	NDP	NDP	15,066	45.59%	3,611	10.93%	PC	Lib	11,455	6,060	15,066	224	–	–	239	–	–	–	–	33,044
ON	Bruce—Grey	PC	PC	27,611	64.73%	17,680	41.45%	Lib	NDP	27,611	9,931	5,112	–	–	–	–	–	–	–	–	42,654
ON	Burlington	PC	PC	37,577	61.94%	25,890	42.67%	NDP	Lib	37,577	11,406	11,687	–	–	–	–	–	–	–	–	60,670
ON	Cambridge	PC	PC	22,963	60.22%	13,792	36.17%	NDP	Lib	22,963	5,545	9,171	343	–	–	–	–	–	–	112	38,134
ON	Cochrane-Superior	Lib	Lib	12,359	41.72%	2,769	9.35%	PC	NDP	9,590	12,359	7,672	–	–	–	–	–	–	–	–	29,621
ON	Davenport	Lib	Lib	13,248	53.67%	7,700	31.19%	NDP	PC	5,217	13,248	5,548	–	–	–	256	252	–	–	165	24,686
ON	Don Valley East	Lib	PC	29,706	54.36%	11,128	20.36%	Lib	NDP	29,706	18,578	5,842	–	–	–	–	356	–	162	–	54,644
ON	Don Valley West	PC	PC	29,905	59.92%	17,050	34.16%	Lib	NDP	29,905	12,855	6,570	–	–	–	–	577	–	–	–	49,907
ON	Durham—Northumberland	PC	PC	24,968	59.34%	16,228	38.57%	Lib	NDP	24,968	8,740	7,805	353	–	–	–	211	–	–	–	42,077
ON	Eglinton—Lawrence	Lib	Lib	18,645	42.98%	1,169	2.69%	PC	NDP	17,476	18,645	6,458	–	–	–	–	362	–	219	219	43,379
ON	Elgin	PC	PC	23,302	67.07%	16,505	47.50%	Lib	NDP	23,302	6,797	4,646	–	–	–	–	–	–	–	–	34,745
ON	Erie	PC	PC	19,197	55.84%	9,881	28.74%	Lib	NDP	19,197	9,316	5,868	–	–	–	–	–	–	–	–	34,381
ON	Essex—Kent	Lib	PC	18,661	58.02%	9,393	29.20%	Lib	NDP	18,661	9,268	4,234	–	–	–	–	–	–	–	–	32,163
ON	Essex—Windsor	Lib	NDP	18,746	39.31%	3,673	7.70%	PC	Lib	15,073	13,866	18,746	–	–	–	–	–	–	–	–	47,685
ON	Etobicoke Centre	PC	PC	34,026	56.83%	16,173	27.01%	Lib	NDP	34,026	17,853	7,657	–	–	–	–	339	–	–	–	59,875
ON	Etobicoke North	Lib	PC	22,713	40.48%	873	1.56%	Lib	NDP	22,713	21,840	11,136	–	–	–	–	417	–	–	–	56,106
ON	Etobicoke—Lakeshore	Lib	PC	19,902	44.78%	6,447	14.51%	Lib	NDP	19,902	13,455	10,549	–	–	–	–	317	–	–	216	44,439
ON	Glengarry—Prescott—Russell	Lib	Lib	26,057	53.11%	9,887	20.15%	PC	NDP	16,170	26,057	6,838	–	–	–	–	–	–	–	–	49,065
ON	Grey—Simcoe	PC	PC	23,342	59.78%	13,973	35.78%	Lib	NDP	23,342	9,369	6,001	–	–	–	–	337	–	–	–	39,049
ON	Guelph	Lib	PC	23,484	49.91%	9,727	20.67%	Lib	NDP	23,484	13,757	9,153	343	–	–	–	314	–	–	–	47,051
ON	Haldimand—Norfolk	PC	PC	27,296	59.02%	15,135	32.72%	Lib	NDP	27,296	12,161	6,138	–	–	–	–	–	–	656	–	46,251
ON	Halton	PC	PC	38,076	60.57%	23,951	38.10%	Lib	NDP	38,076	14,125	9,164	–	–	–	1,494	–	–	–	–	62,859
ON	Hamilton East	Lib	Lib	14,533	37.88%	2,661	6.94%	NDP	PC	11,711	14,533	11,872	–	–	–	–	–	102	–	146	38,364
ON	Hamilton Mountain	NDP	NDP	25,789	49.18%	8,785	16.75%	PC	Lib	17,004	9,514	25,789	–	–	–	–	–	–	–	133	52,440
ON	Hamilton West	PC	PC	16,573	40.37%	4,194	10.22%	Lib	NDP	16,573	12,379	11,508	–	–	–	–	300	–	–	292	41,052
ON	Hamilton—Wentworth	PC	PC	25,595	52.00%	11,402	23.17%	Lib	NDP	25,595	14,193	8,836	–	–	–	333	172	–	–	88	49,217
ON	Hastings—Frontenac—Lennox and Addington	PC	PC	19,996	56.26%	10,239	28.81%	Lib	NDP	19,996	9,757	5,349	–	–	–	–	–	–	441	–	35,543
ON	Huron—Bruce	PC	PC	23,969	64.77%	15,167	40.99%	Lib	NDP	23,969	8,802	4,075	–	–	–	–	158	–	–	–	37,004
ON	Kenora—Rainy River	Lib	NDP	13,319	37.05%	620	1.72%	PC	Lib	12,699	9,928	13,319	–	–	–	–	–	–	–	–	35,946
ON	Kent	Lib	PC	18,279	48.82%	5,252	14.03%	Lib	NDP	18,279	13,027	6,138	–	–	–	–	–	–	–	–	37,444
ON	Kingston and the Islands	PC	PC	25,997	55.10%	12,910	27.36%	Lib	NDP	25,997	13,087	5,950	–	–	–	478	258	–	1,410	–	47,180
ON	Kitchener	Lib	PC	26,710	46.84%	10,580	18.56%	Lib	NDP	26,710	16,130	13,873	–	–	–	–	306	–	–	–	57,019
ON	Lambton—Middlesex	Lib	PC	22,501	54.59%	8,613	20.90%	Lib	NDP	22,501	13,888	4,826	–	–	–	–	–	–	–	–	41,215
ON	Lanark—Renfrew—Carleton	PC	PC	24,395	53.77%	8,867	19.54%	Lib	NDP	24,395	15,528	5,310	–	–	–	–	–	–	–	139	45,372
ON	Leeds—Grenville	PC	PC	26,961	61.50%	16,739	38.18%	Lib	NDP	26,961	10,222	6,121	–	–	–	348	190	–	–	–	43,842
ON	Lincoln	Lib	PC	26,318	49.09%	11,672	21.77%	Lib	NDP	26,318	14,646	11,888	–	–	–	345	–	120	292	–	53,609
ON	London East	Lib	PC	18,154	47.24%	7,830	20.38%	NDP	Lib	18,154	9,948	10,324	–	–	–	–	–	–	–	–	38,426
ON	London West	Lib	PC	34,517	51.42%	12,816	19.09%	Lib	NDP	34,517	21,701	10,911	–	–	–	–	–	–	–	–	67,129
ON	London—Middlesex	Lib	PC	18,586	47.00%	7,384	18.67%	Lib	NDP	18,586	11,202	9,753	–	–	–	–	–	–	–	–	39,541
ON	Mississauga North	Lib	PC	47,124	49.50%	13,921	14.62%	Lib	NDP	47,124	33,203	13,823	–	–	–	609	435	–	–	–	95,194
ON	Mississauga South	PC	PC	32,946	56.41%	16,072	27.52%	Lib	NDP	32,946	16,874	8,584	–	–	–	–	–	–	–	–	58,404
ON	Nepean—Carleton	PC	PC	41,663	55.93%	20,811	27.94%	Lib	NDP	41,663	20,852	11,035	–	–	–	737	–	–	204	–	74,491
ON	Niagara Falls	Lib	PC	22,852	55.11%	12,989	31.33%	NDP	Lib	22,852	8,219	9,863	–	–	–	352	–	177	–	–	41,463
ON	Nickel Belt	Lib	NDP	17,141	38.60%	3,284	7.39%	PC	Lib	13,857	13,124	17,141	288	–	–	–	–	–	–	–	44,410
ON	Nipissing	Lib	PC	17,247	47.20%	2,689	7.36%	Lib	NDP	17,247	14,558	4,735	–	–	–	–	–	–	–	–	36,540
ON	Northumberland	PC	PC	24,060	62.29%	14,526	37.61%	Lib	NDP	24,060	9,534	4,633	–	–	–	262	138	–	–	–	38,627
ON	Ontario	PC	PC	35,163	56.10%	20,644	32.94%	Lib	NDP	35,163	14,519	12,995	–	–	–	–	–	–	–	–	62,677
ON	Oshawa	NDP	NDP	25,092	42.30%	2,064	3.48%	PC	Lib	23,028	10,719	25,092	–	–	–	–	335	–	–	146	59,320
ON	Ottawa Centre	Lib	NDP	17,844	34.37%	54	0.10%	PC	Lib	17,790	15,380	17,844	382	–	–	285	–	–	145	93	51,919
ON	Ottawa West	Lib	PC	26,591	48.80%	7,277	13.35%	Lib	NDP	26,591	19,314	8,304	–	–	–	–	–	–	285	–	54,494
ON	Ottawa—Carleton	Lib	PC	34,693	44.74%	3,946	5.09%	Lib	NDP	34,693	30,747	10,760	648	–	–	341	–	–	281	69	77,539
ON	Ottawa—Vanier	Lib	Lib	21,401	49.08%	8,830	20.25%	PC	NDP	12,571	21,401	9,364	–	–	–	–	–	–	265	–	43,601
ON	Oxford	PC	PC	25,642	57.08%	12,758	28.40%	Lib	NDP	25,642	12,884	6,077	–	–	–	–	322	–	–	–	44,925
ON	Parkdale—High Park	Lib	PC	15,879	40.23%	1,460	3.70%	Lib	NDP	15,879	14,419	8,232	–	–	–	592	223	–	–	130	39,475
ON	Parry Sound—Muskoka	PC	PC	22,739	57.24%	13,184	33.19%	Lib	NDP	22,739	9,555	7,113	–	–	–	–	–	–	316	–	39,723
ON	Perth	PC	PC	19,186	54.91%	9,031	25.85%	Lib	NDP	19,186	10,155	5,599	–	–	–	–	–	–	–	–	34,940
ON	Peterborough	PC	PC	27,121	52.69%	15,384	29.89%	Lib	NDP	27,121	11,737	10,648	309	–	–	175	1,479	–	–	–	51,469
ON	Prince Edward—Hastings	PC	PC	21,034	54.33%	10,713	27.67%	Lib	NDP	21,034	10,321	7,162	–	–	–	–	–	–	197	–	38,714
ON	Renfrew—Nipissing—Pembroke	Lib	Lib	19,502	45.12%	38	0.09%	PC	NDP	19,464	19,502	4,253	–	–	–	–	–	–	–	–	43,219
ON	Rosedale	PC	PC	23,211	52.80%	11,723	26.67%	Lib	NDP	23,211	11,488	7,836	–	–	–	821	291	–	–	316	43,963
ON	Sarnia—Lambton	Lib	PC	24,066	54.62%	12,753	28.95%	Lib	NDP	24,066	11,313	8,538	–	–	–	–	–	–	141	–	44,058
ON	Sault Ste. Marie	Lib	PC	13,135	38.60%	2,409	7.08%	NDP	Lib	13,135	9,972	10,726	–	–	–	–	–	–	–	198	34,031
ON	Scarborough Centre	Lib	PC	19,968	46.67%	5,739	13.41%	Lib	NDP	19,968	14,229	8,240	–	–	–	–	345	–	–	–	42,782
ON	Scarborough East	PC	PC	26,349	55.60%	13,024	27.48%	Lib	NDP	26,349	13,325	6,422	–	–	–	553	512	–	–	229	47,390
ON	Scarborough West	Lib	PC	17,028	40.92%	4,798	11.53%	Lib	NDP	17,028	12,230	11,436	–	–	–	364	330	–	–	228	41,616
ON	Simcoe North	PC	PC	24,887	54.96%	12,825	28.32%	Lib	NDP	24,887	12,062	7,742	–	–	–	362	229	–	–	–	45,282
ON	Simcoe South	PC	PC	30,702	58.05%	16,796	31.76%	Lib	NDP	30,702	13,906	8,283	–	–	–	–	–	–	–	–	52,891
ON	Spadina	Lib	NDP	13,241	39.03%	1,361	4.01%	Lib	PC	8,061	11,880	13,241	289	–	–	–	358	–	98	–	33,927
ON	St. Catharines	PC	PC	26,621	49.73%	10,224	19.10%	NDP	Lib	26,621	9,890	16,397	–	–	–	365	–	108	–	149	53,530
ON	St. Paul's	Lib	PC	20,914	47.56%	4,255	9.68%	Lib	NDP	20,914	16,659	5,545	–	–	–	514	210	–	–	135	43,977
ON	Stormont—Dundas	Lib	PC	21,043	46.01%	2,222	4.86%	Lib	NDP	21,043	18,821	5,869	–	–	–	–	–	–	–	–	45,733
ON	Sudbury	Lib	Lib	18,012	41.30%	3,912	8.97%	PC	NDP	14,100	18,012	11,185	241	–	–	–	–	–	–	75	43,613
ON	Thunder Bay—Atikokan	Lib	NDP	14,715	41.50%	2,675	7.54%	PC	Lib	12,040	8,704	14,715	–	–	–	–	–	–	–	–	35,459
ON	Thunder Bay—Nipigon	Lib	NDP	13,901	37.15%	1,165	3.11%	Lib	PC	10,601	12,736	13,901	–	–	–	–	180	–	–	–	37,418
ON	Timiskaming	Lib	PC	15,359	53.89%	8,674	30.43%	NDP	Lib	15,359	6,308	6,685	–	–	–	–	–	151	–	–	28,503
ON	Timmins—Chapleau	Lib	PC	11,944	37.46%	1,671	5.24%	Lib	NDP	11,944	10,273	9,543	–	–	–	–	–	–	127	–	31,887
ON	Trinity	Lib	Lib	9,811	43.59%	3,099	13.77%	NDP	PC	5,120	9,811	6,712	–	–	–	341	255	–	–	268	22,507
ON	Victoria—Haliburton	PC	PC	30,229	60.94%	20,197	40.71%	Lib	NDP	30,229	10,032	8,682	–	–	–	339	324	–	–	–	49,606
ON	Waterloo	PC	PC	31,898	56.35%	17,987	31.77%	Lib	NDP	31,898	13,911	10,275	–	–	–	–	525	–	–	–	56,609
ON	Welland	Lib	PC	18,418	42.02%	3,937	8.98%	Lib	NDP	18,418	14,481	10,508	–	–	–	284	–	–	–	145	43,836
ON	Wellington—Dufferin—Simcoe	PC	PC	29,983	68.53%	22,680	51.84%	Lib	NDP	29,983	7,303	6,468	–	–	–	–	–	–	–	–	43,754
ON	Willowdale	Lib	PC	22,425	43.52%	362	0.70%	Lib	NDP	22,425	22,063	6,711	–	–	–	–	329	–	–	–	51,528
ON	Windsor West	Lib	Lib	13,624	40.55%	2,121	6.31%	NDP	PC	8,158	13,624	11,503	232	–	–	–	–	–	–	84	33,601
ON	Windsor—Walkerville	Lib	NDP	14,604	36.76%	1,058	2.66%	PC	Lib	13,546	11,574	14,604	–	–	–	–	–	–	–	–	39,724
ON	York Centre	Lib	Lib	20,810	51.18%	9,672	23.79%	PC	NDP	11,138	20,810	8,037	–	–	–	–	244	–	429	–	40,658
ON	York East	Lib	PC	21,978	47.27%	5,459	11.74%	Lib	NDP	21,978	16,519	7,581	–	–	–	–	243	–	–	171	46,492
ON	York North	PC	Ind	32,200	36.48%	4,245	4.81%	PC	Lib	27,955	18,034	10,077	–	–	–	–	–	–	32,200	–	88,266
ON	York South—Weston	Lib	Lib	14,217	37.74%	2,538	6.74%	NDP	PC	10,789	14,217	11,679	–	–	–	–	281	–	526	174	37,666
ON	York West	Lib	Lib	17,629	44.56%	5,411	13.68%	PC	NDP	12,218	17,629	8,718	–	–	–	238	335	–	279	147	39,564
ON	York—Peel	PC	PC	37,493	62.18%	24,955	41.38%	Lib	NDP	37,493	12,538	9,353	–	–	–	–	437	–	480	–	60,301
ON	York—Scarborough	Lib	PC	48,809	48.63%	12,940	12.89%	Lib	NDP	48,809	35,869	13,260	–	–	–	–	1,067	–	1,370	–	100,375
PE	Cardigan	Lib	PC	10,566	53.36%	2,222	11.22%	Lib	NDP	10,566	8,344	891	–	–	–	–	–	–	–	–	19,801
PE	Egmont	Lib	Lib	8,777	49.78%	918	5.21%	PC	NDP	7,859	8,777	994	–	–	–	–	–	–	–	–	17,630
PE	Hillsborough	PC	PC	9,158	53.20%	2,390	13.88%	Lib	NDP	9,158	6,768	846	–	–	–	37	–	–	405	–	17,214
PE	Malpeque	PC	PC	10,577	56.35%	4,391	23.39%	Lib	NDP	10,577	6,186	2,006	–	–	–	–	–	–	–	–	18,769
QC	Abitibi	Lib	PC	23,230	51.96%	10,705	23.95%	Lib	NDP	23,230	12,525	3,583	2,264	1,925	–	–	–	1,179	–	–	44,706
QC	Argenteuil—Papineau	Lib	PC	21,105	55.93%	9,009	23.88%	Lib	NDP	21,105	12,096	2,671	946	566	–	–	–	–	350	–	37,734
QC	Beauce	Lib	PC	25,028	53.10%	4,705	9.98%	Lib	NDP	25,028	20,323	1,217	–	569	–	–	–	–	–	–	47,137
QC	Beauharnois—Salaberry	Lib	PC	27,614	63.13%	16,219	37.08%	Lib	NDP	27,614	11,395	2,720	1,216	798	–	–	–	–	–	–	43,743
QC	Bellechasse	Lib	PC	24,357	57.84%	9,857	23.41%	Lib	NDP	24,357	14,500	1,666	1,070	518	–	–	–	–	–	–	42,111
QC	Berthier—Maskinongé—Lanaudière	Lib	PC	31,189	69.62%	19,453	43.42%	Lib	NDP	31,189	11,736	1,200	–	608	–	–	–	–	–	68	44,801
QC	Blainville—Deux-Montagnes	Lib	PC	28,863	47.13%	5,131	8.38%	Lib	NDP	28,863	23,732	5,609	1,558	1,032	–	–	–	255	139	58	61,246
QC	Bonaventure—Îles-de-la-Madeleine	Lib	PC	15,502	50.09%	1,813	5.86%	Lib	NDP	15,502	13,689	1,040	–	–	–	–	–	–	440	280	30,951
QC	Bourassa	Lib	Lib	20,221	43.94%	1,518	3.30%	PC	NDP	18,703	20,221	3,741	1,618	1,169	–	–	–	236	204	125	46,017
QC	Brome—Missisquoi	Lib	PC	21,678	53.07%	5,985	14.65%	Lib	NDP	21,678	15,693	2,271	–	997	–	–	116	–	–	96	40,851
QC	Chambly	Lib	PC	31,535	51.82%	13,457	22.11%	Lib	NDP	31,535	18,078	6,783	2,328	1,942	–	–	–	–	–	189	60,855
QC	Champlain	Lib	PC	27,467	60.01%	13,008	28.42%	Lib	NDP	27,467	14,459	3,124	–	723	–	–	–	–	–	–	45,773
QC	Charlesbourg	Lib	PC	37,592	52.41%	14,955	20.85%	Lib	NDP	37,592	22,637	7,301	2,557	1,088	–	–	–	469	–	84	71,728
QC	Charlevoix	Lib	PC	23,661	63.61%	11,755	31.60%	Lib	NDP	23,661	11,906	1,022	–	610	–	–	–	–	–	–	37,199
QC	Châteauguay	Lib	PC	21,318	46.59%	4,005	8.75%	Lib	NDP	21,318	17,313	5,083	–	1,630	–	–	284	–	–	124	45,752
QC	Chicoutimi	Lib	PC	22,304	60.81%	11,568	31.54%	Lib	NDP	22,304	10,736	2,211	801	626	–	–	–	–	–	–	36,678
QC	Dollard	Lib	PC	26,076	45.86%	4,625	8.13%	Lib	NDP	26,076	21,451	6,619	1,247	978	–	–	381	–	–	104	56,856
QC	Drummond	Lib	PC	23,693	56.23%	9,556	22.68%	Lib	NDP	23,693	14,137	2,610	–	1,057	–	–	–	301	338	–	42,136
QC	Duvernay	Lib	PC	29,877	50.36%	11,412	19.23%	Lib	NDP	29,877	18,465	5,013	2,088	3,195	–	–	–	174	453	66	59,331
QC	Frontenac	Lib	PC	28,246	71.17%	19,092	48.10%	Lib	NDP	28,246	9,154	1,081	823	386	–	–	–	–	–	–	39,690
QC	Gamelin	Lib	PC	20,870	44.52%	3,379	7.21%	Lib	NDP	20,870	17,491	4,730	1,659	1,313	–	720	–	–	–	96	46,879
QC	Gaspé	Lib	PC	19,128	60.87%	8,913	28.37%	Lib	NDP	19,128	10,215	1,065	–	697	–	–	–	–	317	–	31,422
QC	Gatineau	Lib	PC	25,873	50.91%	8,377	16.48%	Lib	NDP	25,873	17,496	6,543	–	766	–	–	–	–	–	142	50,820
QC	Hochelaga—Maisonneuve	Lib	PC	13,244	41.21%	1,043	3.25%	Lib	NDP	13,244	12,201	3,596	1,847	1,089	–	–	–	–	–	162	32,139
QC	Hull—Aylmer	Lib	Lib	17,058	40.58%	1,495	3.56%	PC	NDP	15,563	17,058	8,247	–	1,015	–	–	–	–	–	156	42,039
QC	Joliette	PC	PC	38,839	73.91%	29,833	56.77%	Lib	NDP	38,839	9,006	2,186	1,515	654	–	–	–	200	–	147	52,547
QC	Jonquière	Lib	PC	18,217	49.64%	4,129	11.25%	Lib	NDP	18,217	14,088	1,870	905	1,620	–	–	–	–	–	–	36,700
QC	Kamouraska—Rivière-du-Loup	Lib	PC	19,651	53.21%	6,729	18.22%	Lib	Rhino	19,651	12,922	1,550	1,989	584	–	–	–	–	233	–	36,929
QC	La Prairie	Lib	PC	26,506	41.63%	1,324	2.08%	Lib	NDP	26,506	25,182	8,602	1,851	1,373	–	–	–	–	–	157	63,671
QC	Labelle	Lib	PC	28,286	55.58%	13,821	27.16%	Lib	NDP	28,286	14,465	4,670	1,567	1,546	–	–	–	274	–	84	50,892
QC	Lac-Saint-Jean	Lib	PC	25,270	61.79%	12,587	30.78%	Lib	NDP	25,270	12,683	2,132	–	813	–	–	–	–	–	–	40,898
QC	Lachine	Lib	PC	24,301	51.65%	9,145	19.44%	Lib	NDP	24,301	15,156	5,628	966	503	–	–	245	–	250	–	47,049
QC	Langelier	Lib	PC	16,872	43.09%	2,868	7.32%	Lib	NDP	16,872	14,004	4,597	2,576	919	–	–	–	189	–	–	39,157
QC	Lasalle	Lib	PC	23,238	46.73%	3,820	7.68%	Lib	NDP	23,238	19,418	4,755	1,331	861	–	–	–	–	–	122	49,725
QC	Laurier	Lib	Lib	9,302	34.58%	1,582	5.88%	PrCdn	NDP	7,720	9,302	4,595	3,247	906	–	751	–	194	–	183	26,898
QC	Laval	Lib	PC	30,696	47.60%	7,694	11.93%	Lib	NDP	30,696	23,002	8,158	–	2,331	–	–	–	–	–	299	64,486
QC	Laval-des-Rapides	Lib	Lib	22,789	43.90%	2,369	4.56%	PC	NDP	20,420	22,789	5,215	1,910	1,492	–	–	–	–	–	90	51,916
QC	Lévis	Lib	PC	32,338	49.60%	15,055	23.09%	Lib	NDP	32,338	17,283	12,076	1,630	1,649	–	–	–	216	–	–	65,192
QC	Longueuil	Lib	PC	28,956	47.73%	9,302	15.33%	Lib	NDP	28,956	19,654	6,401	2,523	3,054	–	–	–	–	–	73	60,661
QC	Lotbinière	Lib	PC	22,584	48.53%	2,382	5.12%	Lib	NDP	22,584	20,202	1,963	909	881	–	–	–	–	–	–	46,539
QC	Louis-Hébert	Lib	PC	29,420	45.96%	6,828	10.67%	Lib	NDP	29,420	22,592	7,548	2,003	1,106	–	–	–	184	1,153	–	64,006
QC	Manicouagan	Lib	PC	28,208	71.55%	18,568	47.10%	Lib	NDP	28,208	9,640	939	–	536	–	–	–	–	–	101	39,424
QC	Matapédia—Matane	Lib	PC	15,994	52.69%	6,065	19.98%	Lib	PNQ	15,994	9,929	909	–	3,523	–	–	–	–	–	–	30,355
QC	Mégantic—Compton—Stanstead	Lib	PC	25,679	59.97%	12,556	29.32%	Lib	NDP	25,679	13,123	2,690	–	427	–	454	–	399	–	51	42,823
QC	Montmorency—Orléans	Lib	PC	22,753	47.03%	3,527	7.29%	Lib	NDP	22,753	19,226	3,931	1,599	586	–	–	–	288	–	–	48,383
QC	Montreal—Mercier	Lib	PC	25,071	46.36%	5,736	10.61%	Lib	NDP	25,071	19,335	4,925	2,038	2,557	–	–	–	–	–	154	54,080
QC	Montreal—Sainte-Marie	Lib	Lib	13,668	43.38%	2,749	8.72%	PC	NDP	10,919	13,668	3,525	2,338	990	–	–	–	–	–	69	31,509
QC	Mount Royal	Lib	Lib	22,716	47.47%	4,009	8.38%	PC	NDP	18,707	22,716	4,735	776	392	–	–	338	–	110	80	47,854
QC	Notre-Dame-de-Grâce—Lachine East	Lib	Lib	17,910	43.43%	2,065	5.01%	PC	NDP	15,845	17,910	5,772	1,007	564	–	–	–	–	–	140	41,238
QC	Outremont	Lib	Lib	14,508	40.92%	4,125	11.63%	PC	NDP	10,383	14,508	6,687	1,484	1,185	–	890	–	–	–	321	35,458
QC	Papineau	Lib	Lib	12,754	38.99%	701	2.14%	PC	NDP	12,053	12,754	4,295	1,925	1,169	–	–	–	147	104	260	32,707
QC	Pontiac—Gatineau—Labelle	Lib	PC	21,754	61.96%	11,729	33.41%	Lib	NDP	21,754	10,025	2,667	–	524	–	–	–	–	–	141	35,111
QC	Portneuf	Lib	PC	23,797	51.06%	6,110	13.11%	Lib	NDP	23,797	17,687	3,012	1,222	638	–	–	–	248	–	–	46,604
QC	Québec-Est	Lib	PC	19,782	48.12%	5,450	13.26%	Lib	NDP	19,782	14,332	4,189	1,683	790	–	–	–	239	–	96	41,111
QC	Richelieu	Lib	PC	28,747	59.22%	13,814	28.46%	Lib	NDP	28,747	14,933	2,174	945	1,463	–	–	–	202	–	76	48,540
QC	Richmond—Wolfe	Lib	Lib	18,069	51.40%	4,234	12.04%	PC	NDP	13,835	18,069	1,638	–	1,339	–	–	–	273	–	–	35,154
QC	Rimouski—Témiscouata	Lib	PC	25,516	59.82%	11,282	26.45%	Lib	NDP	25,516	14,234	1,250	752	840	–	–	–	–	–	64	42,656
QC	Roberval	Lib	PC	22,981	61.85%	10,064	27.09%	Lib	NDP	22,981	12,917	837	–	422	–	–	–	–	–	–	37,157
QC	Rosemont	Lib	PC	15,782	42.22%	1,305	3.49%	Lib	NDP	15,782	14,477	4,054	1,587	1,008	–	–	–	143	101	225	37,377
QC	Saint-Denis	Lib	Lib	18,750	48.44%	6,628	17.12%	PC	NDP	12,122	18,750	4,581	1,588	981	–	–	–	–	297	391	38,710
QC	Saint-Henri—Westmount	Lib	Lib	18,244	45.29%	4,076	10.12%	PC	NDP	14,168	18,244	5,889	1,289	653	–	–	–	–	–	38	40,281
QC	Saint-Hyacinthe-Bagot	Lib	PC	22,984	47.35%	1,590	3.28%	Lib	NDP	22,984	21,394	2,196	998	940	–	–	–	–	–	33	48,545
QC	Saint-Jacques	Lib	Lib	10,875	39.64%	584	2.13%	PC	NDP	10,291	10,875	4,057	1,204	738	–	–	–	–	–	268	27,433
QC	Saint-Jean	Lib	PC	30,769	59.76%	15,946	30.97%	Lib	NDP	30,769	14,823	3,642	1,209	1,002	–	–	–	–	–	45	51,490
QC	Saint-Léonard—Anjou	Lib	Lib	24,520	41.40%	1,245	2.10%	PC	NDP	23,275	24,520	7,506	2,152	1,634	–	–	–	–	–	145	59,232
QC	Saint-Maurice	Lib	Lib	24,050	58.88%	9,582	23.46%	PC	NDP	14,468	24,050	1,433	–	892	–	–	–	–	–	–	40,843
QC	Saint-Michel—Ahuntsic	Lib	Lib	17,269	42.48%	1,825	4.49%	PC	NDP	15,444	17,269	4,875	1,543	1,243	–	–	–	–	–	278	40,652
QC	Shefford	Lib	Lib	25,483	47.51%	2,455	4.58%	PC	NDP	23,028	25,483	3,569	–	1,552	–	–	–	–	–	–	53,632
QC	Sherbrooke	Lib	PC	22,232	51.50%	7,625	17.66%	Lib	NDP	22,232	14,607	4,230	1,054	687	–	–	–	197	–	164	43,171
QC	Témiscamingue	Lib	PC	20,347	50.24%	6,591	16.27%	Lib	NDP	20,347	13,756	2,189	1,457	2,126	–	–	–	626	–	–	40,501
QC	Terrebonne	Lib	PC	43,822	60.30%	24,782	34.10%	Lib	NDP	43,822	19,040	6,454	–	3,060	–	–	–	–	–	292	72,668
QC	Trois-Rivières	Lib	PC	26,843	63.94%	16,626	39.60%	Lib	NDP	26,843	10,217	1,947	1,018	1,847	–	–	–	–	–	110	41,982
QC	Vaudreuil	Lib	PC	37,499	54.48%	17,137	24.90%	Lib	NDP	37,499	20,362	7,993	1,470	1,017	–	–	345	–	–	139	68,825
QC	Verchères	Lib	PC	38,690	56.02%	19,325	27.98%	Lib	NDP	38,690	19,365	6,534	2,216	2,153	–	–	–	–	–	109	69,067
QC	Verdun—Saint-Paul	Lib	PC	17,378	43.52%	947	2.37%	Lib	NDP	17,378	16,431	3,912	1,309	798	–	–	–	–	–	99	39,927
SK	Assiniboia	PC	PC	16,026	47.21%	5,173	15.24%	NDP	Lib	16,026	6,472	10,853	–	–	595	–	–	–	–	–	33,946
SK	Humboldt—Lake Centre	NDP	NDP	15,087	43.49%	1,921	5.54%	PC	Lib	13,166	6,005	15,087	–	–	429	–	–	–	–	–	34,687
SK	Kindersley—Lloydminster	PC	PC	20,436	58.28%	10,207	29.11%	NDP	Lib	20,436	3,979	10,229	–	–	419	–	–	–	–	–	35,063
SK	Mackenzie	PC	PC	11,403	40.04%	555	1.95%	NDP	Lib	11,403	4,961	10,848	–	–	1,269	–	–	–	–	–	28,481
SK	Moose Jaw	PC	PC	15,803	46.01%	2,465	7.18%	NDP	Lib	15,803	4,762	13,338	–	–	446	–	–	–	–	–	34,349
SK	Prince Albert	NDP	NDP	13,359	35.56%	297	0.79%	PC	Lib	13,062	10,886	13,359	–	–	262	–	–	–	–	–	37,569
SK	Qu'Appelle—Moose Mountain	PC	PC	14,470	49.83%	6,056	20.85%	NDP	Lib	14,470	4,898	8,414	–	–	655	–	–	–	602	–	29,039
SK	Regina East	NDP	NDP	20,474	44.88%	5,289	11.59%	PC	Lib	15,185	9,554	20,474	–	–	408	–	–	–	–	–	45,621
SK	Regina West	NDP	NDP	23,865	46.82%	7,799	15.30%	PC	Lib	16,066	10,405	23,865	313	–	247	–	–	–	–	75	50,971
SK	Saskatoon East	NDP	PC	17,087	36.92%	417	0.90%	NDP	Lib	17,087	11,901	16,670	340	–	123	164	–	–	–	–	46,285
SK	Saskatoon West	PC	PC	26,012	49.67%	7,102	13.56%	NDP	Lib	26,012	6,355	18,910	495	–	337	150	–	–	109	–	52,368
SK	Swift Current—Maple Creek	PC	PC	14,590	49.74%	6,394	21.80%	NDP	Lib	14,590	5,967	8,196	–	–	582	–	–	–	–	–	29,335
SK	The Battlefords—Meadow Lake	NDP	PC	12,895	43.31%	336	1.13%	NDP	Lib	12,895	4,002	12,559	–	–	319	–	–	–	–	–	29,775
SK	Yorkton—Melville	NDP	NDP	18,116	51.30%	6,316	17.89%	PC	Lib	11,800	4,996	18,116	–	–	400	–	–	–	–	–	35,312
Terr	Nunatsiaq	NDP	PC	2,237	32.49%	247	3.59%	Lib	NDP	2,237	1,990	1,973	–	–	–	–	–	–	686	–	6,886
Terr	Western Arctic	PC	PC	5,822	46.12%	2,284	18.09%	NDP	Lib	5,822	3,264	3,538	–	–	–	–	–	–	–	–	12,624
Terr	Yukon	PC	PC	6,648	56.80%	4,113	35.14%	Lib	NDP	6,648	2,535	1,884	126	–	–	–	511	–	–	–	11,704

= open seat
= winning candidate was in previous House
= not incumbent; was previously elected as an MP
= incumbent had switched allegiance
= incumbency arose from byelection gain
= previously incumbent in another riding
= other incumbents renominated
= campaigned under the Progressive Canadian banner
= Previously a member of one of the provincial/territorial legislatures
= multiple candidates

=== Comparative analysis for ridings (1984 vs 1980) ===
Summary of riding results by turnout, vote share for winning candidate, and swing (vs 1980)
Electoral district		Winning party		Vote share		Swing (pp) (Note: Positive indicates improvement to standing of party winning in 1980; negative points to 1980's second-place party being swung to.)
Province	Name	Winning party		%	Change (pp)	Swing (pp)
AB	Athabasca	PC	Hold	68.31	23.65	22.32
AB	Bow River	PC	Hold	76.20	-0.40	3.56
AB	Calgary Centre	PC	Hold	66.35	8.96	11.51
AB	Calgary East	PC	Hold	58.85	6.02	4.58
AB	Calgary North	PC	Hold	72.79	9.37	11.25
AB	Calgary South	PC	Hold	77.91	9.79	10.89
AB	Calgary West	PC	Hold	74.70	8.85	10.25
AB	Crowfoot	PC	Hold	77.83	1.22	4.70
AB	Edmonton East	PC	Hold	48.48	-5.41	2.08
AB	Edmonton North	PC	Hold	57.29	-1.69	4.30
AB	Edmonton South	PC	Hold	62.46	1.39	5.88
AB	Edmonton West	PC	Hold	58.82	2.59	5.26
AB	Edmonton-Strathcona	PC	Hold	61.43	2.05	6.86
AB	Lethbridge-Foothills	PC	Hold	67.38	-1.22	2.32
AB	Medicine Hat	PC	Hold	75.75	5.44	7.00
AB	Peace River	PC	Hold	62.24	2.88	4.64
AB	Pembina	PC	Hold	70.57	5.88	8.92
AB	Red Deer	PC	Hold	75.43	0.68	2.91
AB	Vegreville	PC	Hold	80.20	5.39	5.64
AB	Wetaskiwin	PC	Hold	70.93	-4.05	1.51
AB	Yellowhead	PC	Hold	74.01	4.53	7.29
BC	Burnaby	NDP	Hold	48.00	5.57	3.54
BC	Capilano	PC	Hold	56.45	-2.91	-2.62
BC	Cariboo-Chilcotin	PC	Hold	54.51	13.76	8.54
BC	Comox-Powell River	NDP	Hold	44.61	-4.36	-7.70
BC	Cowichan-Malahat-The Islands	NDP	Hold	45.06	-3.11	-2.89
BC	Esquimalt-Saanich	PC	Hold	48.28	3.26	1.32
BC	Fraser Valley East	PC	Hold	59.92	10.20	5.25
BC	Fraser Valley West	PC	Hold	54.72	4.10	3.21
BC	Kamloops-Shuswap	NDP	Hold	54.08	14.97	6.85
BC	Kootenay East-Revelstoke	PC	Gain	46.49	8.51	-3.79
BC	Kootenay West	PC	Gain	47.43	7.25	-2.55
BC	Mission-Port Moody	PC	Gain	47.53	11.53	-9.28
BC	Nanaimo-Alberni	PC	Gain	45.81	11.00	-8.66
BC	New Westminster-Coquitlam	NDP	Hold	46.18	-0.24	-3.06
BC	North Vancouver-Burnaby	PC	Hold	43.63	5.53	5.78
BC	Okanagan North	PC	Hold	56.07	7.37	4.84
BC	Okanagan-Similkameen	PC	Hold	52.21	7.19	4.30
BC	Prince George-Bulkley Valley	PC	Hold	49.29	9.81	3.56
BC	Prince George-Peace River	PC	Hold	62.44	10.34	6.21
BC	Richmond-South Delta	PC	Hold	55.40	3.43	1.94
BC	Skeena	NDP	Hold	45.79	-3.73	3.16
BC	Surrey-White Rock-North Delta	PC	Hold	53.58	4.67	3.60
BC	Vancouver Centre	PC	Hold	43.23	7.96	3.65
BC	Vancouver East	NDP	Hold	51.79	7.88	11.26
BC	Vancouver Kingsway	NDP	Hold	51.10	4.25	2.54
BC	Vancouver Quadra	Lib	Gain	43.94	13.23	-10.93
BC	Vancouver South	PC	Hold	54.87	1.59	2.81
BC	Victoria	PC	Hold	46.34	-4.00	-4.14
MB	Brandon-Souris	PC	Hold	52.19	5.32	9.40
MB	Churchill	NDP	Hold	45.56	2.29	7.03
MB	Dauphin-Swan River	PC	Gain	42.56	4.13	-6.30
MB	Lisgar	PC	Hold	49.47	-13.18	-1.45
MB	Portage-Marquette	PC	Hold	49.37	-3.65	2.84
MB	Provencher	PC	Hold	58.27	13.33	10.80
MB	Selkirk-Interlake	PC	Gain	40.67	4.71	-5.85
MB	St. Boniface	PC	Gain	39.70	10.30	-10.75
MB	Winnipeg North	NDP	Hold	43.31	-7.21	-3.05
MB	Winnipeg North Centre	NDP	Hold	46.13	-10.87	-5.00
MB	Winnipeg-Assiniboine	PC	Hold	52.36	3.26	3.33
MB	Winnipeg-Birds Hill	NDP	Hold	45.81	-8.47	-9.29
MB	Winnipeg-Fort Garry	Lib	Hold	45.70	-0.64	-3.47
MB	Winnipeg-St. James	PC	Gain	42.52	6.53	-5.29
NB	Carleton-Charlotte	PC	Hold	61.79	14.41	13.26
NB	Fundy-Royal	PC	Hold	56.58	15.74	13.85
NB	Gloucester	PC	Gain	55.12	35.52	-30.40
NB	Madawaska-Victoria	PC	Gain	51.89	29.00	-26.47
NB	Moncton	PC	Gain	57.17	22.26	-21.21
NB	Northumberland-Miramichi	PC	Gain	53.94	26.11	-21.61
NB	Restigouche	PC	Gain	45.65	26.71	-24.14
NB	Saint John	PC	Gain	52.20	13.16	-14.55
NB	Westmorland-Kent	Lib	Hold	41.75	-25.37	-23.37
NB	York-Sunbury	PC	Hold	58.85	11.15	12.52
NL	Bonavista-Trinity-Conception	PC	Gain	55.04	24.84	-18.05
NL	Burin-St. George's	PC	Gain	47.36	30.93	-27.27
NL	Gander-Twillingate	Lib	Hold	53.11	-10.19	-12.55
NL	Grand Falls-White Bay-Labrador	Lib	Hold	45.13	-7.54	-12.39
NL	Humber-Port au Port-St. Barbe	Lib	Hold	48.29	3.73	15.87
NL	St. John's East	PC	Hold	78.30	17.05	14.10
NL	St. John's West	PC	Hold	76.03	20.83	17.14
NS	Annapolis Valley-Hants	PC	Hold	53.85	11.88	7.37
NS	Cape Breton Highlands-Canso	PC	Gain	50.05	14.73	-13.15
NS	Cape Breton-East Richmond	Lib	Hold	55.81	16.54	22.34
NS	Cape Breton-The Sydneys	Lib	Hold	44.12	0.32	5.69
NS	Central Nova	PC	Hold	61.00	12.97	10.62
NS	Cumberland-Colchester	PC	Hold	57.30	10.96	7.92
NS	Dartmouth-Halifax East	PC	Hold	54.95	13.10	12.37
NS	Halifax	PC	Gain	44.78	6.19	-6.73
NS	Halifax West	PC	Hold	54.28	14.31	14.32
NS	South Shore	PC	Hold	56.69	12.30	10.79
NS	South West Nova	PC	Gain	50.59	13.78	-10.87
ON	Algoma	Lib	Hold	38.26	-12.28	-2.69
ON	Beaches	NDP	Hold	40.62	5.04	7.10
ON	Brampton-Georgetown	PC	Hold	56.15	15.69	14.06
ON	Brant	NDP	Hold	44.20	3.08	-3.54
ON	Broadview-Greenwood	NDP	Hold	45.59	5.23	9.96
ON	Bruce-Grey	PC	Hold	64.73	17.44	17.38
ON	Burlington	PC	Hold	61.94	11.18	12.58
ON	Cambridge	PC	Hold	60.22	20.87	14.00
ON	Cochrane-Superior	Lib	Hold	41.72	-10.86	0.23
ON	Davenport	Lib	Hold	53.67	-8.76	-4.52
ON	Don Valley East	PC	Gain	54.36	11.44	-11.02
ON	Don Valley West	PC	Hold	59.92	8.16	10.08
ON	Durham-Northumberland	PC	Hold	59.34	14.26	11.59
ON	Eglinton-Lawrence	Lib	Hold	42.98	-7.48	-6.97
ON	Elgin	PC	Hold	67.07	17.26	17.19
ON	Erie	PC	Hold	55.84	15.83	13.55
ON	Essex-Kent	PC	Gain	58.02	26.90	-25.52
ON	Essex-Windsor	NDP	Gain	39.31	-0.48	-10.87
ON	Etobicoke Centre	PC	Hold	56.83	9.73	10.66
ON	Etobicoke North	PC	Gain	40.48	9.25	-8.89
ON	Etobicoke-Lakeshore	PC	Gain	44.78	14.66	-12.61
ON	Glengarry-Prescott-Russell	Lib	Hold	53.11	-15.36	-14.30
ON	Grey-Simcoe	PC	Hold	59.78	13.69	12.39
ON	Guelph	PC	Gain	49.91	12.36	-11.16
ON	Haldimand-Norfolk	PC	Hold	59.02	17.01	16.20
ON	Halton	PC	Hold	60.57	13.80	13.98
ON	Hamilton East	Lib	Hold	37.88	-3.92	-0.33
ON	Hamilton Mountain	NDP	Hold	49.18	13.71	6.88
ON	Hamilton West	PC	Hold	40.37	1.82	4.40
ON	Hamilton-Wentworth	PC	Hold	52.00	7.03	5.39
ON	Hastings-Frontenac-Lennox and Addington	PC	Hold	56.26	13.94	12.80
ON	Huron-Bruce	PC	Hold	64.77	17.23	17.39
ON	Kenora-Rainy River	NDP	Gain	37.05	-4.22	-5.24
ON	Kent	PC	Gain	48.82	8.20	-8.22
ON	Kingston and the Islands	PC	Hold	55.10	13.28	12.41
ON	Kitchener	PC	Gain	46.84	10.61	-10.80
ON	Lambton-Middlesex	PC	Gain	54.59	11.74	-11.51
ON	Lanark-Renfrew-Carleton	PC	Hold	53.77	-0.87	-1.79
ON	Leeds-Grenville	PC	Hold	61.50	10.28	9.34
ON	Lincoln	PC	Gain	49.09	14.09	-11.63
ON	London East	PC	Gain	47.24	17.57	-19.86
ON	London West	PC	Gain	51.42	10.64	-11.25
ON	London-Middlesex	PC	Gain	47.00	14.37	-14.53
ON	Mississauga North	PC	Gain	49.50	11.86	-10.82
ON	Mississauga South	PC	Hold	56.41	14.96	13.30
ON	Nepean-Carleton	PC	Hold	55.93	2.38	3.76
ON	Niagara Falls	PC	Gain	55.11	18.17	-19.75
ON	Nickel Belt	NDP	Gain	38.60	-3.47	-7.25
ON	Nipissing	PC	Gain	47.20	11.40	-10.95
ON	Northumberland	PC	Hold	62.29	13.88	13.47
ON	Ontario	PC	Hold	56.10	15.22	11.89
ON	Oshawa	NDP	Hold	42.30	-9.34	-9.95
ON	Ottawa Centre	NDP	Gain	34.37	18.41	-7.07
ON	Ottawa West	PC	Gain	48.80	5.57	-7.19
ON	Ottawa-Carleton	PC	Gain	44.74	10.50	-12.16
ON	Ottawa-Vanier	Lib	Hold	49.08	-17.42	-14.22
ON	Oxford	PC	Hold	57.08	11.17	9.66
ON	Parkdale-High Park	PC	Gain	40.23	8.16	-8.59
ON	Parry Sound-Muskoka	PC	Hold	57.24	15.19	13.39
ON	Perth	PC	Hold	54.91	7.41	8.08
ON	Peterborough	PC	Hold	52.69	12.45	12.65
ON	Prince Edward-Hastings	PC	Hold	54.33	8.44	8.31
ON	Renfrew-Nipissing-Pembroke	Lib	Hold	45.12	-6.59	-9.48
ON	Rosedale	PC	Hold	52.80	8.84	10.90
ON	Sarnia-Lambton	PC	Gain	54.62	19.76	-17.33
ON	Sault Ste. Marie	PC	Gain	38.60	25.68	-5.62
ON	Scarborough Centre	PC	Gain	46.67	10.24	-8.65
ON	Scarborough East	PC	Hold	55.60	15.08	13.16
ON	Scarborough West	PC	Gain	40.92	9.65	-0.48
ON	Simcoe North	PC	Hold	54.96	18.52	14.08
ON	Simcoe South	PC	Hold	58.05	14.52	11.92
ON	Spadina	NDP	Gain	39.03	10.03	-10.90
ON	St. Catharines	PC	Hold	49.73	11.84	14.15
ON	St. Paul's	PC	Gain	47.56	8.02	-7.70
ON	Stormont-Dundas	PC	Gain	46.01	10.06	-10.96
ON	Sudbury	Lib	Hold	41.30	-14.40	-4.44
ON	Thunder Bay-Atikokan	NDP	Gain	41.50	2.51	-8.60
ON	Thunder Bay-Nipigon	NDP	Gain	37.15	0.75	-6.66
ON	Timiskaming	PC	Gain	53.89	35.59	-1.55
ON	Timmins-Chapleau	PC	Gain	37.46	25.29	-6.97
ON	Trinity	Lib	Hold	43.59	-13.92	-10.48
ON	Victoria-Haliburton	PC	Hold	60.94	12.52	10.92
ON	Waterloo	PC	Hold	56.35	16.35	15.74
ON	Welland	PC	Gain	42.02	14.68	-3.19
ON	Wellington-Dufferin-Simcoe	PC	Hold	68.53	14.76	14.38
ON	Willowdale	PC	Gain	43.52	6.12	-5.37
ON	Windsor West	Lib	Hold	40.55	-17.96	-11.61
ON	Windsor-Walkerville	NDP	Gain	36.76	0.72	-11.80
ON	York Centre	Lib	Hold	51.18	-9.78	-4.63
ON	York East	PC	Gain	47.27	10.94	-10.13
ON	York North	Ind	Gain	36.48	Did not campaign in 1980	4.15
ON	York South-Weston	Lib	Hold	37.74	-9.47	-6.98
ON	York West	Lib	Hold	44.56	-12.20	-5.33
ON	York-Peel	PC	Hold	62.18	15.09	14.15
ON	York-Scarborough	PC	Gain	48.63	10.84	-11.51
PE	Cardigan	PC	Gain	53.36	8.46	-7.25
PE	Egmont	Lib	Hold	49.78	-2.59	-2.26
PE	Hillsborough	PC	Hold	53.20	5.54	5.03
PE	Malpeque	PC	Hold	56.35	6.21	7.96
QC	Abitibi	PC	Gain	51.96	47.37	4.39
QC	Argenteuil-Papineau	PC	Gain	55.93	39.92	-38.24
QC	Beauce	PC	Gain	53.10	51.17	N/A (Note: No Social Credit candidate in 1984.)
QC	Beauharnois-Salaberry	PC	Gain	63.13	48.14	-47.62
QC	Bellechasse	PC	Gain	57.84	50.62	N/A
QC	Berthier-Maskinongé-Lanaudière	PC	Gain	69.62	26.20	-26.37
QC	Blainville-Deux-Montagnes	PC	Gain	47.13	40.03	-16.59
QC	Bonaventure-Îles-de-la-Madeleine	PC	Gain	50.09	31.78	-28.47
QC	Bourassa	Lib	Hold	43.94	-32.55	-13.98
QC	Brome-Missisquoi	PC	Gain	53.07	12.20	-13.44
QC	Chambly	PC	Gain	51.82	41.92	-19.41
QC	Champlain	PC	Gain	60.01	49.03	-8.52
QC	Charlesbourg	PC	Gain	52.41	45.52	-18.67
QC	Charlevoix	PC	Gain	63.61	45.45	-42.10
QC	Châteauguay	PC	Gain	46.59	37.55	-17.97
QC	Chicoutimi	PC	Gain	60.81	42.63	-40.44
QC	Dollard	PC	Gain	45.86	35.16	-19.36
QC	Drummond	PC	Gain	56.23	41.54	-40.38
QC	Duvernay	PC	Gain	50.36	42.71	-19.57
QC	Frontenac	PC	Gain	71.17	55.85	N/A
QC	Gamelin	PC	Gain	44.52	36.48	-17.01
QC	Gaspé	PC	Gain	60.87	28.30	-28.16
QC	Gatineau	PC	Gain	50.91	43.96	-23.21
QC	Hochelaga-Maisonneuve	PC	Gain	41.21	34.35	-18.55
QC	Hull--Aylmer	Lib	Hold	40.58	-27.55	-11.32
QC	Joliette	PC	Hold	73.91	26.95	27.98
QC	Jonquière	PC	Gain	49.64	45.83	-13.36
QC	Kamouraska-Rivière-du-Loup	PC	Gain	53.21	48.86	N/A
QC	La Prairie	PC	Gain	41.63	31.93	-17.25
QC	Labelle	PC	Gain	55.58	33.40	-35.76
QC	Lac-Saint-Jean	PC	Gain	61.79	48.06	-40.20
QC	Lachine	PC	Gain	51.65	21.54	-24.53
QC	Langelier	PC	Gain	43.09	35.55	-17.08
QC	Lasalle	PC	Gain	46.73	39.22	-18.16
QC	Laurier	Lib	Hold	34.58	-32.08	-15.77
QC	Laval	PC	Gain	47.60	40.35	-20.59
QC	Laval-des-Rapides	Lib	Hold	43.90	-31.07	-15.27
QC	Lévis	PC	Gain	49.60	40.67	-23.29
QC	Longueuil	PC	Gain	47.73	40.61	-17.09
QC	Lotbinière	PC	Gain	48.53	26.78	-21.24
QC	Louis-Hébert	PC	Gain	45.96	35.58	-13.63
QC	Manicouagan	PC	Gain	71.55	56.08	-50.14
QC	Matapédia-Matane	PC	Gain	52.69	41.28	-43.20
QC	Mégantic-Compton-Stanstead	PC	Gain	59.97	32.54	-29.55
QC	Montmorency-Orléans	PC	Gain	47.03	36.27	-33.32
QC	Montreal-Mercier	PC	Gain	46.36	38.23	-16.47
QC	Montreal-Sainte Marie	Lib	Hold	43.38	-25.12	-23.49
QC	Mount Royal	Lib	Hold	47.47	-33.76	-31.14
QC	Notre-Dame-de-Grâce-Lachine East	Lib	Hold	43.43	-27.73	-25.74
QC	Outremont	Lib	Hold	40.92	-30.57	-18.51
QC	Papineau	Lib	Hold	38.99	-35.69	-19.75
QC	Pontiac-Gatineau-Labelle	PC	Gain	61.96	45.18	-43.51
QC	Portneuf	PC	Gain	51.06	43.72	-17.03
QC	Québec-Est	PC	Gain	48.12	41.29	-19.76
QC	Richelieu	PC	Gain	59.22	39.29	-38.34
QC	Richmond-Wolfe	Lib	Hold	51.40	-12.27	-13.20
QC	Rimouski-Témiscouata	PC	Gain	59.82	49.39	N/A
QC	Roberval	PC	Gain	61.85	60.36	N/A
QC	Rosemont	PC	Gain	42.22	35.76	-19.22
QC	Saint-Denis	Lib	Hold	48.44	-28.98	-15.65
QC	Saint-Henri-Westmount	Lib	Hold	45.29	-22.20	-19.65
QC	Saint-Hyacinthe-Bagot	PC	Gain	47.35	23.46	-23.18
QC	Saint-Jacques	Lib	Hold	39.64	-31.57	-28.45
QC	Saint-Jean	PC	Gain	59.76	49.20	-18.99
QC	Saint-Léonard-Anjou	Lib	Hold	41.40	-39.73	-22.61
QC	Saint-Maurice	Lib	Hold	58.88	-17.82	-23.09
QC	Saint-Michel-Ahuntsic	Lib	Hold	42.48	-33.00	-17.75
QC	Shefford	Lib	Hold	47.51	-20.96	-21.57
QC	Sherbrooke	PC	Gain	51.50	42.23	-18.90
QC	Témiscamingue	PC	Gain	50.24	45.01	-2.32
QC	Terrebonne	PC	Gain	60.30	51.21	-18.93
QC	Trois-Rivières	PC	Gain	63.94	51.04	-47.59
QC	Vaudreuil	PC	Gain	54.48	42.85	-20.52
QC	Verchères	PC	Gain	56.02	45.72	-18.39
QC	Verdun-Saint-Paul	PC	Gain	43.52	34.17	-17.02
SK	Assiniboia	PC	Hold	47.21	11.27	12.34
SK	Humboldt-Lake Centre	NDP	Hold	43.49	1.87	0.17
SK	Kindersley-Lloydminster	PC	Hold	58.28	12.02	7.02
SK	Mackenzie	PC	Hold	40.04	-1.57	0.28
SK	Moose Jaw	PC	Hold	46.01	-0.41	-2.39
SK	Prince Albert	NDP	Hold	35.56	0.76	2.27
SK	Qu'Appelle-Moose Mountain	PC	Hold	49.83	0.26	-0.09
SK	Regina East	NDP	Hold	44.88	8.05	4.41
SK	Regina West	NDP	Hold	46.82	4.62	2.81
SK	Saskatoon East	PC	Gain	36.92	4.04	-1.26
SK	Saskatoon West	PC	Hold	49.67	6.34	3.36
SK	Swift Current-Maple Creek	PC	Hold	49.74	1.77	2.40
SK	The Battlefords-Meadow Lake	PC	Gain	43.31	9.24	-1.43
SK	Yorkton-Melville	NDP	Hold	51.30	5.61	4.76
Terr	Nunatsiaq	PC	Gain	32.49	24.71	-2.86
Terr	Western Arctic	PC	Hold	46.12	12.31	8.96
Terr	Yukon	PC	Hold	56.80	16.20	17.05

== Regional analysis ==
=== Maritimes ===
Change in popular vote by party (1984 vs 1980)
Party	1980	1980	Change (pp)
█ Progressive Conservative	53.18%	36.62%	16.56
█ Liberal	34.11%	45.07%	-10.96
█ New Democratic	12.34%	17.61%	-5.26
█ Rhinoceros	0.10%	0.25%	-0.15
█ Other	0.26%	0.45%	-0.19

Party candidates in 2nd place
Party in 1st place	1984			1980			
Party in 1st place	Party in 2nd place		Total	Party in 2nd place			Total
Party in 1st place	PC	Lib	Total	PC	Lib	NDP	Total
Progressive Conservative		25	25		13		13
Liberal	7		7	16		3	19
Total	7	25	32	16	13	3	32

=== Quebec ===
Change in popular vote by party (1984 vs 1980)
Party	1980	1980	Change (pp)
█ Progressive Conservative	50.23%	12.62%	37.61
█ Liberal	35.44%	68.21%	-32.78
█ New Democratic	8.78%	9.08%	-0.30
█ Social Credit	0.19%	5.90%	-5.71
█ Rhinoceros	2.41%	2.99%	-0.58
█ Parti nationaliste	2.50%	0.49%	2.01
█ Other	0.46%	0.70%	-0.24

Party candidates in 2nd place
Party in 1st place	1984			1980					
Party in 1st place	Party in 2nd place		Total	Party in 2nd place					Total
Party in 1st place	PC	Lib	Total	PC	Lib	NDP	SC	Rhino	Total
Progressive Conservative		58	58		1				1
Liberal	17		17	29		35	8	2	74
Total	17	58	75	29	1	35	8	2	75

=== Ontario ===
Change in popular vote by party (1984 vs 1980)
Party	1980	1980	Change (pp)
█ Progressive Conservative	47.64%	35.49%	12.15
█ Liberal	29.85%	41.90%	-12.05
█ New Democratic	20.78%	21.84%	-1.07
█ Rhinoceros	0.08%	0.17%	-0.09
█ Green	0.27%	0%	0.27
█ Other	1.38%	0%	0.78

Party candidates in 2nd place
Party in 1st place	1984				1980			
Party in 1st place	Party in 2nd place			Total	Party in 2nd place (Note: Liberals and PCs tied for second place in Beaches.)			Total
Party in 1st place	PC	Lib	NDP	Total	PC	Lib	NDP	Total
Progressive Conservative		60	7	67		37	1	38
Liberal	9		5	14	30		22	52
New Democratic	11	2		13	4	2		6
Independent	1			1				–
Total	21	62	12	95	34	39	23	96

=== Manitoba/Saskatchewan ===
Change in popular vote by party (1984 vs 1980)
Party	1980	1980	Change (pp)
█ Progressive Conservative	42.44%	38.32%	4.12
█ Liberal	19.99%	26.16%	-6.17
█ New Democratic	32.89%	34.86%	-1.97
█ Rhinoceros	0.21%	0.25%	-0.04
█ Confederation of Regions	3.94%	0%	3.94
█ Other	0.53%	0.41%	0.12

Party candidates in 2nd place
Party in 1st place	1984					1980			
Party in 1st place	Party in 2nd place				Total	Party in 2nd place			Total
Party in 1st place	PC	Lib	NDP	CoR	Total	PC	Lib	NDP	Total
Progressive Conservative		2	13	3	18		4	8	12
Liberal	1				1	2			2
New Democratic	9				9	10	4		14
Total	10	2	13	3	28	12	8	8	28

=== Alberta ===
Change in popular vote by party (1984 vs 1980)
Party	1980	1980	Change (pp)
█ Progressive Conservative	68.79%	64.74%	4.05
█ Liberal	12.75%	22.15%	-9.41
█ New Democratic	14.08%	10.26%	3.83
█ Social Credit	0.13%	1.69%	-1.56
█ Rhinoceros	0.39%	0.70%	-0.30
█ Confederation of Regions	2.15%	0%	2.15
█ Green	0.34%	0%	0.34
█ Other	0.88%	1.14%	-0.78

Party candidates in 2nd place
Party in 1st place	1984			1980
Party in 1st place	Lib	NDP	Total	Lib
Progressive Conservative	5	16	21	21

=== British Columbia ===
Change in popular vote by party (1984 vs 1980)
Party	1980	1980	Change (pp)
█ Progressive Conservative	46.64%	41.50%	5.14
█ Liberal	16.43%	22.17%	-5.75
█ New Democratic	35.05%	35.28%	-0.23
█ Rhinoceros	0.36%	0.41%	-0.05
█ Confederation of Regions	0.20%	0%	0.20
█ Green	0.57%	0%	0.57
█ Other	0.52%	0.48%	0.04

Party candidates in 2nd place
Party in 1st place	1984				1980			
Party in 1st place	Party in 2nd place			Total	Party in 2nd place			Total
Party in 1st place	PC	Lib	NDP	Total	PC	Lib	NDP	Total
Progressive Conservative		2	17	19		4	12	16
Liberal	1			1				–
New Democratic	6	2		8	9	3		12
Total	7	4	17	28	9	7	12	28

=== Territories ===
Change in popular vote by party (1984 vs 1980)
Party	1980	1980	Change (pp)
█ Progressive Conservative	47.12%	30.63%	16.49
█ Liberal	24.95%	37.21%	-12.25
█ New Democratic	23.69%	31.47%	-7.78
█ Rhinoceros	0.40%	0.70%	-0.30
█ Other	3.83%	0%	3.83

Party candidates in 2nd place
Party in 1st place	1984			1980		
Party in 1st place	Party in 2nd place		Total	Party in 2nd place		Total
Party in 1st place	Lib	NDP	Total	Lib	NDP	Total
Progressive Conservative	2	1	3	1	1	2
New Democratic			–	1		1
Total	2	1	3	2	1	3
