= Inez Trueman =

Canadian politician (1917–2015)

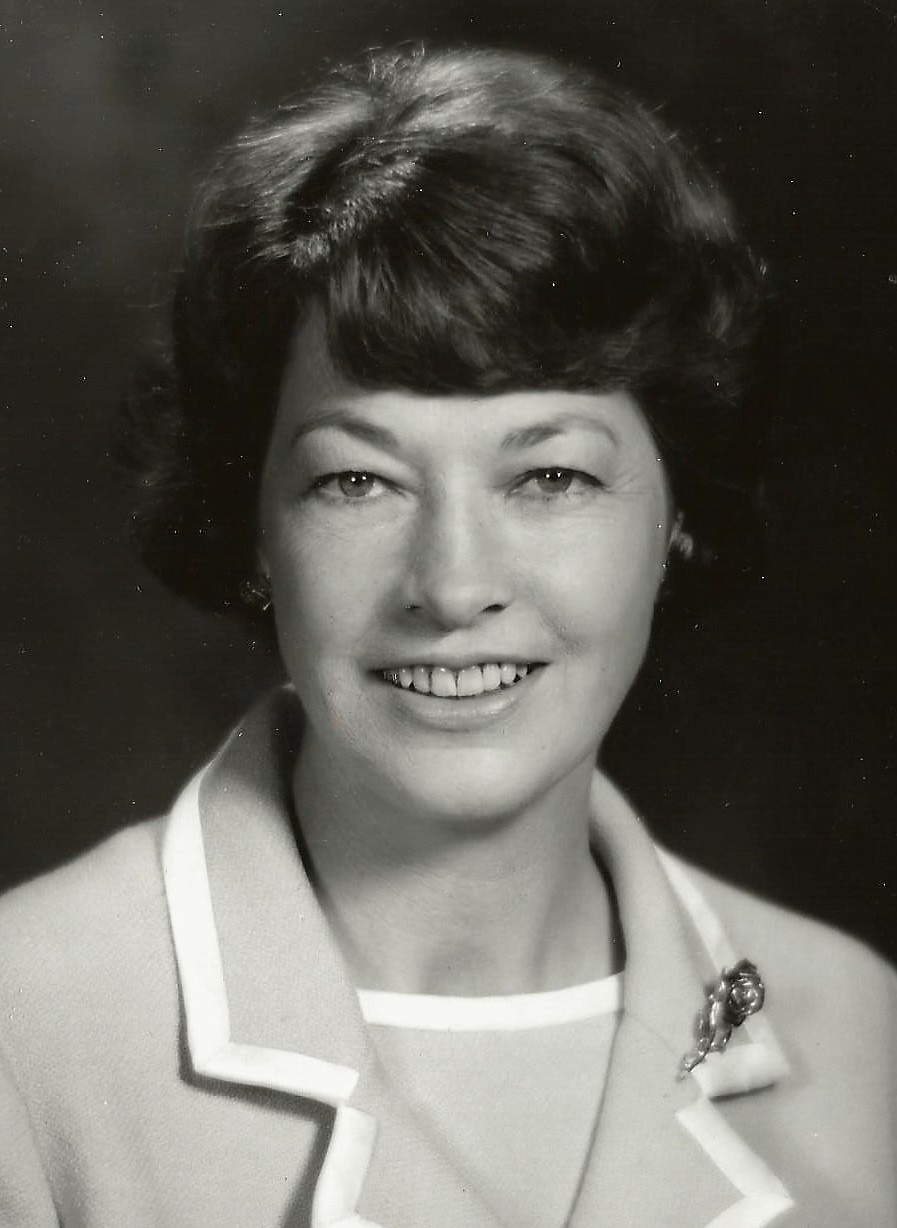
Inez Trueman in June 1968. Professional headshot from time as city councillor in 1968–1969.

Inez Geneva Trueman (née Gandrud; April 8, 1917 – August 22, 2015) was a politician in Manitoba, Canada. She served as a Progressive Conservative member of the Manitoba legislature from 1969 to 1973, and later ran for the House of Commons of Canada. She was only the fifth woman ever to serve in the assembly.

Trueman was born in Glenwood, Minnesota, and educated at the Kahler School of Nursing in Rochester, Minnesota, and worked as a registered nurse. She married Kenneth Trueman, a physician and son of Walter Harley Trueman. She was the President of the Junior League of Winnipeg from 1951 to 1952. Trueman served as a city councillor in Winnipeg from 1968 to 1969.

She was elected to the Manitoba legislature in the provincial election of 1969, defeating New Democrat Una Decter by 304 votes in the Winnipeg riding of Fort Rouge. The NDP won this election, and Trueman sat in the opposition benches, where she was the health and welfare critic. In 1971, she was one of only two opposition MLAs to support the NDP government in amalgamating the city of Winnipeg.

In the 1973 election, she lost her seat to Liberal candidate Lloyd Axworthy.

Trueman did not seek re-election to the provincial legislature after this, but ran for the federal Progressive Conservative Party in the national election of 1980 in the Winnipeg—Fort Garry riding. She was again defeated by Lloyd Axworthy, by this time the incumbent MP running for the federal Liberals.

In 1984, she was elected president of the Manitoba Progressive Conservative Party.

She died on August 22, 2015, in Winnipeg.
