= David W. Atkinson =

Canadian academic administrator

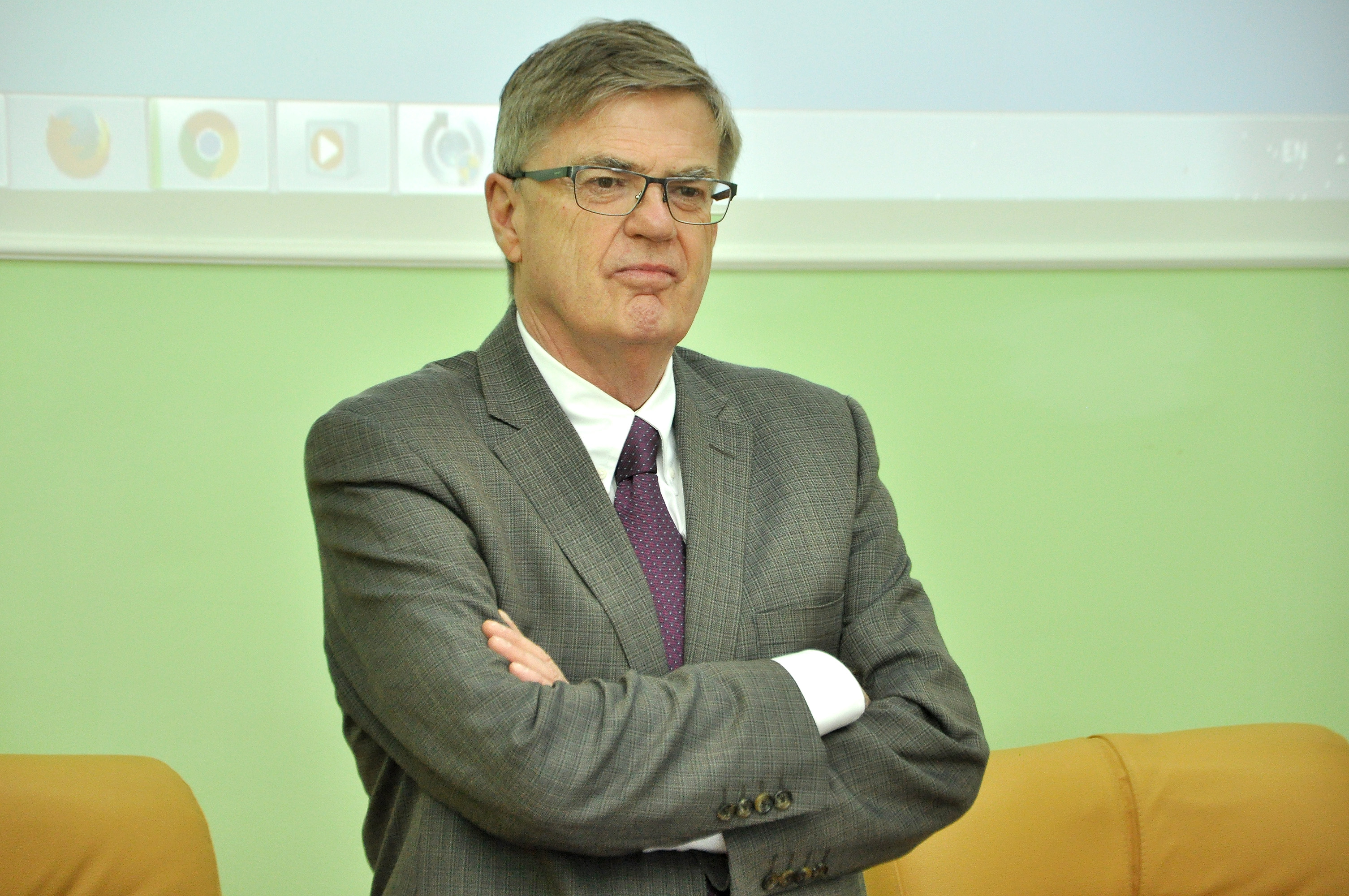

President of Carleton University
- In office 2005–2006

President of MacEwan University
- In office 2011–2017
- Preceded by: Paul J. Byrne
- Succeeded by: Deborah Saucier

Personal details
- Born: David William Atkinson; 1948 (age 77–78) Sunderland, England
- Education: Indiana University, University of Calgary

David William Atkinson (born 1948) is a Canadian academic and former president of MacEwan University. He is the former president of Kwantlen Polytechnic University and two Ontario universities, Brock University in St. Catharines and Carleton University in Ottawa.

Atkinson was born in Sunderland, England, and immigrated to Canada when very young. Educated in Calgary, he attended Indiana University, where he was an All-American in cross country, and a member of the Big Ten Championship cross country team. He returned to the University of Calgary, where he completed his B.A. degree (1970), and subsequently earned an M.A. (1971), and a Ph.D. degree (1975) in English.

Atkinson was a faculty member at the University of Lethbridge from 1977 to 1991, where he took on increasingly senior administrative positions, including director of applied studies, chair of religious studies, associate dean of arts and science, and dean of student affairs. In 1991, he was appointed Dean of Arts and Science at the University of Saskatchewan.

Atkinson is a Paul Harris Fellow of Rotary International. He has also received the Queen's Golden Jubilee Medal and Diamond Jubilee Medal. Atkinson has held faculty positions in both English and religious studies. He has published widely in both disciplines.

== University presidencies ==
=== Brock University ===
In 1997 he was appointed president of Brock University in St. Catharines, Ontario.

=== Carleton University ===
In 2005 he became president of Carleton University in Ottawa, Ontario, a position from which he resigned less than 2 years later.

=== Kwantlen Polytechnic University ===
He was appointed president of Kwantlen Polytechnic University in Surrey, British Columbia in 2008. He resigned to take up the post of president of MacEwan University.

=== MacEwan University ===
Between 2011 and 2017 Atkinson was the fourth president of MacEwan University. During that time MacEwan centralized its satellite campuses to the city center and constructed a new Centre for Arts and Culture building. He also oversaw the official re-branding of Grant MacEwan University into MacEwan University. His successor, Dr. Deborah Saucier, entered office on July 1, 2017. Atkinson returned to teach English at the university in 2018.

== See also ==
- List of Canadian university leaders
