= United College =

United College may refer to:

- United College, St Andrews, Scotland, United Kingdom
- United College of Hong Kong, a college of the Chinese University of Hong Kong, New Territories, Hong Kong
- United College, Waterloo, Ontario, Canada
- United College, Winnipeg, Manitoba, Canada
- United International College, Zhuhai, Guangdong, China
