= Lloyd Axworthy =

Canadian politician (born 1939)

The Honourable Lloyd Axworthy PC CC OM
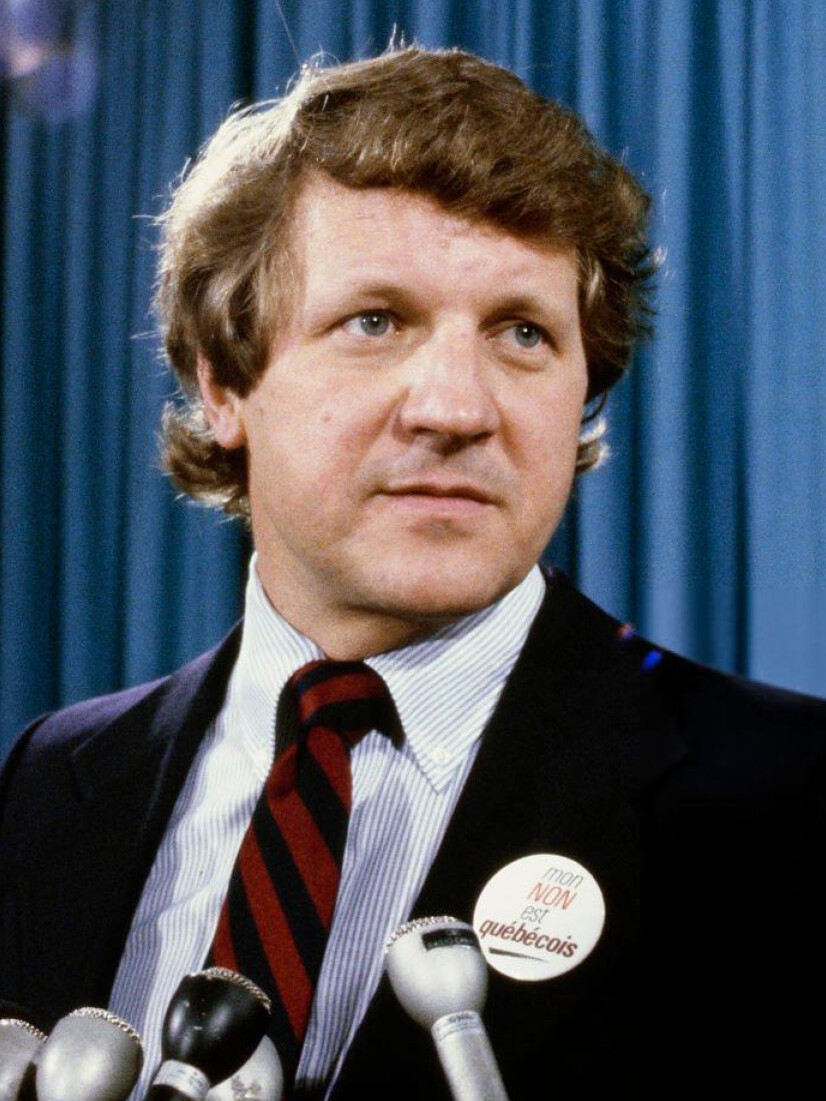
- Axworthy, c. 1980

6th President and Vice-Chancellor of the University of Winnipeg
- In office June 6, 2004 – June 27, 2014
- Chancellor: Sanford Riley; Bob Silver
- Preceded by: Patrick Deane (acting)
- Succeeded by: Annette Trimbee

Minister of Foreign Affairs
- In office January 25, 1996 – October 16, 2000
- Prime Minister: Jean Chrétien
- Preceded by: André Ouellet
- Succeeded by: John Manley

Minister of Employment and Immigration
- In office November 4, 1993 – January 24, 1996
- Prime Minister: Jean Chrétien
- Preceded by: Bernard Valcourt
- Succeeded by: Doug Young
- In office March 3, 1980 – August 11, 1983
- Prime Minister: Pierre Trudeau
- Preceded by: Ron Atkey
- Succeeded by: John Roberts

Minister of Labour
- In office November 4, 1993 – February 21, 1995
- Prime Minister: Jean Chrétien
- Preceded by: Bernard Valcourt
- Succeeded by: Lucienne Robillard

Minister of Transport
- In office August 12, 1983 – September 16, 1984
- Prime Minister: Pierre Trudeau; John Turner
- Preceded by: Jean-Luc Pépin
- Succeeded by: Don Mazankowski

Member of Parliament for Winnipeg South Centre (Winnipeg—Fort Garry; 1979–1988)
- In office May 22, 1979 – November 27, 2000
- Preceded by: Riding established
- Succeeded by: Anita Neville

Member of the Legislative Assembly of Manitoba for Fort Rouge
- In office June 28, 1973 – April 6, 1979
- Preceded by: Inez Trueman
- Succeeded by: June Westbury

Personal details
- Born: Lloyd Norman Axworthy; December 21, 1939 (age 86) North Battleford, Saskatchewan, Canada
- Party: Liberal
- Other political affiliations: New Democratic
- Education: University of Winnipeg (BA); Princeton University (PhD)
- Occupation: Politician; statesman; academic

Lloyd Norman Axworthy (born December 21, 1939) is a Canadian politician, elder statesman and academic. He served as Minister of Foreign Affairs in the Cabinet chaired by Prime Minister Jean Chrétien. Following his retirement from parliament, he served as president and vice-chancellor of the University of Winnipeg from 2004 to 2014 and as chancellor of St. Paul's University College (a constituent institution of the University of Waterloo). He is the Chair Emeritus of the World Refugee & Migration Council.

== Biography ==
Axworthy was born in North Battleford, Saskatchewan, to parents Norman and Gwen Axworthy, in a family with strong United Church roots. He received his BA from United College, a Winnipeg-based school, in 1961. He is the older brother of Tom Axworthy and Robert Axworthy (former Manitoba Liberal Party leadership candidate). He received his Ph.D. in politics from Princeton University in 1972 after completing a doctoral dissertation titled "The task force on housing and urban development: a study of democratic decision making in Canada." He returned to Canada to teach at the University of Manitoba and the University of Winnipeg. At the latter, he also became the director of the Institute of Urban Affairs.

Axworthy is a member of the United Church of Canada.

== Early political career ==
Axworthy became involved in politics during the 1950s, becoming a member of the Liberal Party after attending a speech by Lester B. Pearson. He briefly aligned himself with the New Democratic Party (NDP) in the 1960s when Pearson, as federal opposition leader, called for American Bomarc nuclear warheads to be allowed on Canadian soil. He soon returned to the Liberal fold, however, and worked as an executive assistant for John Turner; he supported Turner's bid to become party leader at the 1968 leadership convention.

Axworthy ran for the party in Winnipeg North Centre in the 1968 election, finishing second against veteran NDP Member of Parliament (MP) Stanley Knowles. He first ran for the Legislative Assembly of Manitoba in the 1966 election, placing second to Progressive Conservative Douglas Stanes in St. James. In the 1973 election, he was elected as a Manitoba Liberal in Fort Rouge, He was re-elected in the 1977 election, and was the only Liberal in the legislature from 1977 to 1979.

== Federal government ==
He resigned from the Manitoba legislature on April 6, 1979, to run for the federal House of Commons, and in the 1979 election narrowly defeated former provincial PC leader Sidney Spivak in Winnipeg—Fort Garry. He was re-elected in the 1980 election, becoming the only Liberal MP west of Ontario. He was promoted to cabinet under Prime Minister Pierre Trudeau, serving as Minister of Employment and Immigration, and then as Minister of Transport.

In the Liberal defeat in the 1984 election, Axworthy was one of only two Liberals west of Ontario to be elected (the other being then Liberal leader John Turner). Axworthy played a role in opposition, supporting tough on crime policies, but also supporting fiscal conservatism by critiquing the fiscal taxation policy of Brian Mulroney. He was an especially vocal critic of the Canada–United States Free Trade Agreement.

When the Liberals returned to power in 1993 under Jean Chrétien, Axworthy became a Cabinet minister. After the election, he was given responsibility for the Human Resources Development Canada (HRDC), and launched changes in employment insurance. Although his main interest was urban renewal, in a 1996 cabinet shuffle, he became Minister of Foreign Affairs.

In February 1999 and April 2000, Axworthy was President of the United Nations Security Council with Canada's Ambassador to the UN Robert Fowler. In April 2000, Axworthy supported the highly controversial effort to reduce the sanction against Iraq, under the regime of Saddam Hussein, citing a humanitarian explanation "to avoid making ordinary citizens pay for the actions of their leaders". Axworthy clashed with the US government on this issue, particularly over the lack of alternative options to deter the regime from additional aggression. In 2000, he initiated the International Commission on Intervention and State Sovereignty that led to the UN policy of Responsibility to Protect.

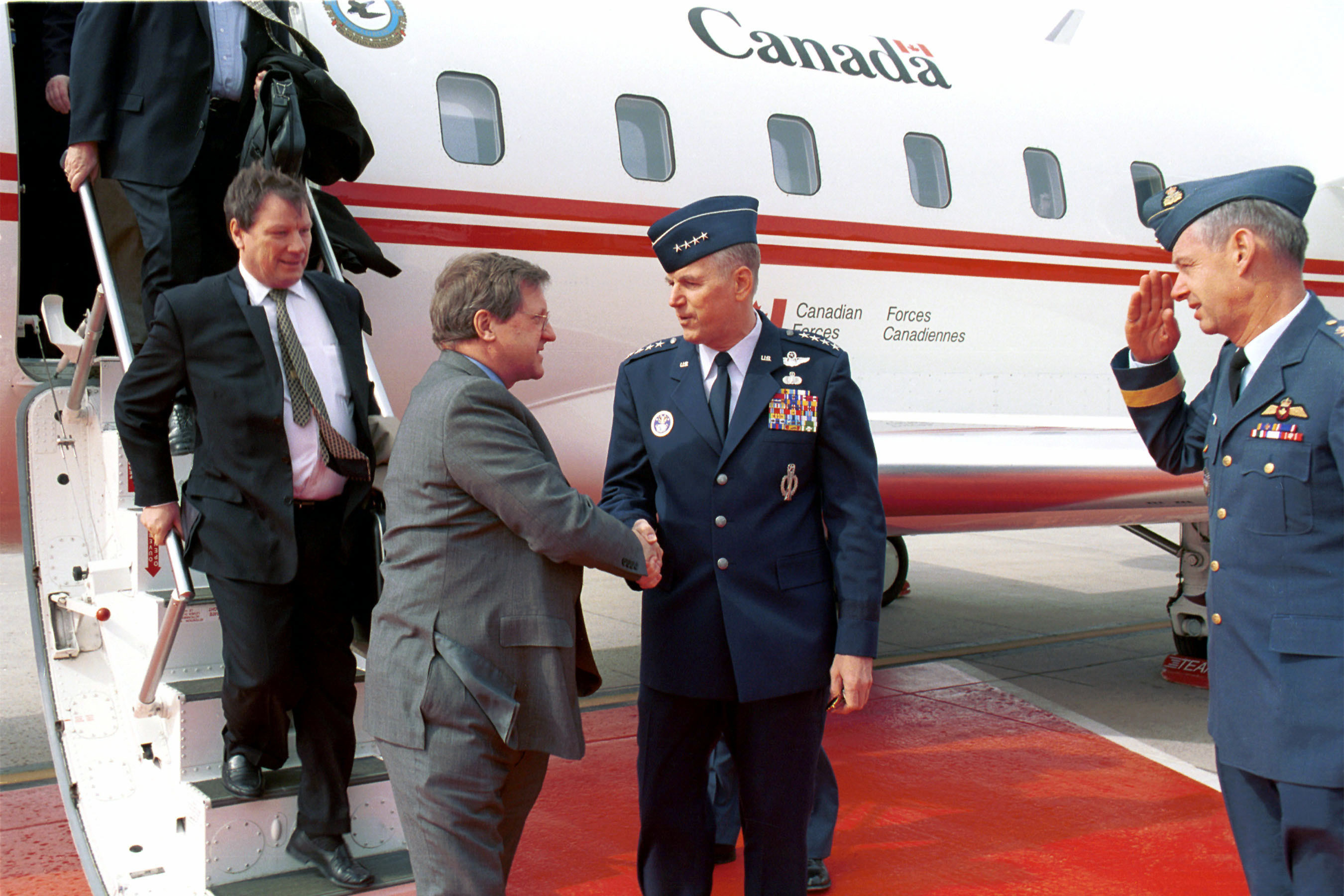
Axworthy (left) as Minister of Foreign Affairs, 1999

He retired from politics at the 2000 federal election, and was succeeded as MP for Winnipeg South Centre by Anita Neville.

== After politics ==
In September 2000, Axworthy returned to academia, joining the Liu Institute for Global Issues at the University of British Columbia. He has published Navigating A New World, a book on the uses of "soft power".

In May 2004, he was appointed president and vice-chancellor of the University of Winnipeg. He retired in June 2014.

In 2006, Axworthy was elected to the Board of Directors of Hudbay.

Axworthy is a former Chair of the Advisory Committee for the Americas Division of Human Rights Watch. He also served on the advisory council of USC Center on Public Diplomacy and of Fair Vote Canada, and is an endorser of the Genocide Intervention Network and International Student Exchange, Ontario. He is a former President of the World Federalist Movement-Institute for Global Policy.

Axworthy became Chancellor of St. Paul's University College, a constituent institution of the University of Waterloo, in October 2014. He retired from that position in 2017.

In 2017, he became the inaugural Chair of the World Refugee & Migration Council, founded by the Centre for International Governance Innovation. He served in that capacity until 2025, and is now Chair Emeritus.

In 2025, he criticized Liberal prime minister Mark Carney's handling of the Trump tariffs, saying he had bent to Donald Trump's will by removing the digital services tax.

== Honours and commemorations ==
Axworthy is closely associated with the development of the "human security" doctrine in Canadian foreign policy, and many of his honours reflect his leadership in international diplomacy, disarmament, and higher education.

=== Canadian state honours ===
On December 30, 2015, Axworthy was promoted to Companion of the Order of Canada, the highest level of the honour, for his sustained contributions to Canadian public life and global governance.

He had previously been appointed an Officer of the Order of Canada on April 18, 2003, in recognition of his leadership in advancing human security and international diplomacy.

On November 12, 1999, he received the Pearson Peace Medal from the United Nations Association in Canada for his contributions to international cooperation and peacebuilding.

=== International recognition ===
In 1997, Axworthy was nominated by United States Senator Patrick Leahy for the Nobel Peace Prize for his leadership in negotiating the Ottawa Treaty banning anti-personnel landmines. The prize was ultimately awarded to the International Campaign to Ban Landmines, which acknowledged his instrumental role in advancing the treaty process. While widely praised for the landmine initiative, some critics argued that its impact was limited because several major powers, including the United States, Russia, and China, did not join the treaty.

On May 5, 1998, Axworthy was awarded the North–South Prize by the Council of Europe in recognition of his work promoting solidarity and human rights between regions.

In 2003, he was elected a Foreign Honorary Member of the American Academy of Arts and Sciences.

=== Academic distinctions ===
Between 2001 and 2014, Axworthy received honorary Doctor of Laws degrees in recognition of his contributions to diplomacy and public service, including:

- University of Manitoba (May 30, 2001)
- Carleton University (June 12, 2004)
- McMaster University (May 27, 2004)
- University of Winnipeg (June 4, 2008)
- University of Waterloo (October 18, 2014), where the degree was conferred through the Faculty of Environment.

=== Indigenous ceremonial recognition ===
On October 15, 2012, Axworthy was honoured at the University of Winnipeg in a sacred Pipe Ceremony led by Anishinaabe Elder Fred Kelly, with participation from Elder Dr. Tobasonakwut Kinew and Dr. Phil Fontaine. During the ceremony he was given the name Waapshki Pinaysee Inini ("White Thunderbird Man") in recognition of his commitment to fostering inclusive learning that reflects Indigenous cultures and traditions. Musician and broadcaster Wab Kinew participated in the ceremony.

== Publications ==
- Navigating a New World, Knopf Canada Publishing, 2004
- Liberals at the Border, University of Toronto Press, 2004
- The Axworthy Legacy, Edited by O. Hampson, N. Hillmer, M. Appel Molot, Oxford University Press, 2001
- Boulevard of Broken Dreams: A 40 Year Journey through Portage Avenue - Displacement, Dislocation, and How Osmosis Can Resolve Community Blight, Rattray Canada Publishing, 2014 (In Press)

== Electoral history ==
1997 Canadian federal election: Winnipeg South Centre
Party	Candidate	Votes	%	±%
Liberal	Lloyd Axworthy	20,006	55.89	−5.55
New Democratic	Sara Malabar	5,717	15.97	+7.63
Progressive Conservative	Andrea Rolstone	5,011	14.00	+4.73
Reform	Gary Hollingshead	4,457	12.45	−0.10
Natural Law	Ron Decter	224	0.63	+0.09
Independent	Jim Blomquist	202	0.56	
Marxist–Leninist	Karen Naylor	180	0.50	+0.32
Total valid votes		35,797	99.17	
Total rejected ballots		299	0.83	
Turnout		36,096	64.92	
Eligible voters		55,600	–	–
Liberal hold		Swing		-6.59

1993 Canadian federal election: Winnipeg South Centre
Party	Candidate	Votes	%	±%
Liberal	Lloyd Axworthy	25,881	61.44	+3.01
Reform	Vern A. Hannah	5,288	12.55	+10.82
Progressive Conservative	Mike Radcliffe	3,903	9.26	−19.64
New Democratic	Lloyd Penner	3,512	8.34	−2.01
National	Bill Loewen	3,099	7.36	
Natural Law	Elizabeth Innes	225	0.53	
Libertarian	Clancy Smith	89	0.21	−0.13
Independent	Karen Naylor	76	0.18	
Canada Party	Ben J. Fulawka	54	0.13	
Total valid votes		42,127	100.0	
Liberal hold		Swing		-3.90

1988 Canadian federal election: Winnipeg South Centre
Party	Candidate	Votes	%
Liberal	Lloyd Axworthy	26,191	58.42
Progressive Conservative	Garth Dawley	12,960	28.91
New Democratic	Les Campbell	4,637	10.34
Reform	Ross Malabar	777	1.73
Libertarian	Clancy Smith	154	0.34
Independent	Ken Kalturnyk	111	0.25
Total valid votes		44,830	100.0

26th Canadian Ministry (1993–2003) – Cabinet of Jean Chrétien
Cabinet posts (4)
Predecessor	Office	Successor
André Ouellet	Minister of Foreign Affairs; 1996–2000	John Manley
Larry Schneider	Minister of Western Economic Diversification; 1993–1996	John Manley
Bernard Valcourt	Minister of Employment and Immigration; 1993–1996 styled as Minister of Human Resources Development	Doug Young
Bernard Valcourt	Minister of Labour; 1993–1995 styled as Minister of Human Resources Development	Lucienne Robillard
23rd Canadian Ministry (1984) – Cabinet of John Turner
Cabinet post (1)
Predecessor	Office	Successor
cont'd from 22nd Min.	Minister of Transport; 1984	Don Mazankowski
22nd Canadian Ministry (1980–1984) – Second cabinet of Pierre Trudeau
Cabinet posts (2)
Predecessor	Office	Successor
Jean-Luc Pépin	Minister of Transport; 1983–1984	cont'd into 23rd Min.
Ron Atkey	Minister of Employment and Immigration; 1980–1983	John Roberts
Special Cabinet Responsibilities
Predecessor	Title	Successor
David MacDonald	Minister responsible for the Status of Women; 1980–1981	Judy Erola
Legislative Assembly of Manitoba
Preceded by Inez Trueman	Member of the Legislative Assembly for Fort Rouge; 1973–1979	Succeeded by June Westbury
Parliament of Canada
Preceded by Sidney Spivak	Member of Parliament for Winnipeg—Fort Garry; 1979–1988	Succeeded by This electoral district was abolished in 1987
Preceded by This electoral district was created in 1987	Member of Parliament for Winnipeg South Centre; 1988–2000	Succeeded by Anita Neville
Academic offices
Preceded by Patrick Deane (acting)	President of the University of Winnipeg; June 6, 2004 – June 27, 2014	Succeeded by Annette Trimbee
New office	Chancellor of St. Paul's University College; October 24, 2014	Incumbent
