= MacEwan University =

University in Edmonton, Alberta, Canada

Grant MacEwan University
- Coat of arms
- Motto: Discendo Floremus (Latin)
- Motto in English: Through learning we flourish
- Type: Public university
- Established: 1971; 55 years ago
- Affiliations: ACAC, AUCC
- President: Annette Trimbee
- Provost: Craig Monk
- Students: 13,481 (2023-24 fulltime equivalent)
- Location: Edmonton, Alberta, Canada
- Campus: Urban
- Colors: Maroon, White
- Sporting affiliations: CWUAA U SPORTS
- Mascot: MacEwan Griffins
- Website: macewan.ca

Grant MacEwan University, commonly known as MacEwan University, is a public university located in downtown Edmonton, Alberta, Canada. Originally established as a community college which was named in honour of Dr. Grant MacEwan, 9th Lieutenant Governor of Alberta in 1971, Grant MacEwan College officially transitioned into a university in 2009 under the Post-Secondary Learning Act. While the university's name was rebranded as MacEwan University for public communication and marketing purposes in 2013, its official name remains Grant MacEwan University. MacEwan university offers a wide range of programs and is home to six faculties and schools, providing nearly 60 programs including baccalaureate degrees, certificates, diplomas, post-diplomas and university transfer programs.

== History ==
Established in 1971 as Grant MacEwan Community College, the institution was named after Dr. J. W. Grant MacEwan, author, educator and at the time the lieutenant governor of Alberta. The college was established by the Government of Alberta to fill a perceived need for college-level programs that focused on career development. Initial educational offerings included one and two-year certificate and diploma programs.

In 1988, the college was granted approval to offer university transfer credit. In 2004, MacEwan became an accredited degree-granting institution offering its first baccalaureate degrees. On September 24, 2009, the institution became Alberta's sixth university and was officially renamed Grant MacEwan University. In September 2013, the university officially re-branded itself as "MacEwan University" for all public communication and marketing purposes; legally, the name remains Grant MacEwan University.

In February 2019, MacEwan University was officially named an Undergraduate University in the Post-Secondary Learning Act.

Presidents

Eight people have held the position of President of MacEwan University:

- John Haar, 1971–1981
- Gerald O. Kelly, 1981–1996
- Harry Davis, 1996
- Paul J. Byrne, 1997–2011
- David W. Atkinson, 2011–2017
- Deborah Saucier, 2017–2019
- John McGrath, 2019–2020
- Annette Trimbee, 2020–present

== Academics ==
MacEwan University is an undergraduate institution divided into four faculties and two schools: Faculty of Arts and Science; Faculty of Fine Arts and Communications; Faculty of Health and Community Studies; Faculty of Nursing; Triffo School of Business; and the School of Continuing Education. The university offers ten baccalaureate degrees, one applied degree and 43 diploma and certificate programs. Some programs are offered in-classroom and full-time, in-classroom part-time, online and distance.

Maclean's notes the university's emphasis on "small class sizes and individualized learning."

MacEwan has two libraries, the Alberta College Library and John L. Haar Library. Both are member libraries of the NEOS Library Consortium, The Alberta Library, Council of Prairie and Pacific University Libraries (COPPUL), and the Canadian University Reciprocal Borrowing Agreement (CURBA).

In an effort to support the Truth and Reconciliation Commission of Canada's Calls to Action, the university established kihêw waciston, (Cree for "eagle's nest") to support the proportion of its students who are indigenous peoples. MacEwan university flies the flags of Alberta, Canada, and Treaty 6, and also features a statue marking the area as Treaty 6 territory.

== Athletics ==
MacEwan University's sports teams are known as the Griffins. Men's and women's sports include: basketball, hockey, volleyball, soccer, cross country, curling and golf. The Griffins compete in the Alberta Colleges Athletics Conference (ACAC), against 16 other post-secondary institutions in Alberta as well as in the Canada West conference of U Sports. Student-athletes on all teams are expected to meet academic requirements and adhere to sport-specific athletic requirements.

In 2011, MacEwan's athletic department submitted an application to Canada West Universities Athletic Association in an effort to transfer to the national U Sports level of competition. MacEwan University was admitted as a probationary member in 2013. In 2016, the university was granted full membership becoming the 56th full member of U Sports, then known as CIS.

== Campuses ==
In its early years, MacEwan operated out of a number of small store-front-style campuses in Edmonton. The facilities included Old Scona School (10523 - 84 Avenue), the Worker's Compensation Board (WCB) building (10048 - 101A Avenue), 7th Street Plaza (10030-107 Street), and the former Dominion Store in Cromdale (8020 - 118 Avenue), with offices and administration located in the Canada Trust building (10150 - 100 Street). In 1988, Don Getty's provincial government committed $100 million for the construction of the City Centre Campus which, at the time, was Alberta Advanced Education and Technology's largest single capital project in its history.

Construction on City Centre Campus began in 1991 on the former site of the Canadian National rail yards on the northern fringe of the city's downtown core. The land was donated by CN.

In September 2009, MacEwan University's Board of Governors approved a plan to move all of the university's operations—spread across four campuses at the time—to the main City Centre Campus. The first step of this consolidation was taken with the opening of the University Service Centre in April 2011. Construction for the new Centre for the Arts and Culture began in 2014 on the west end of the City Centre Campus, and opened in the fall of 2017.

=== City centre campus ===
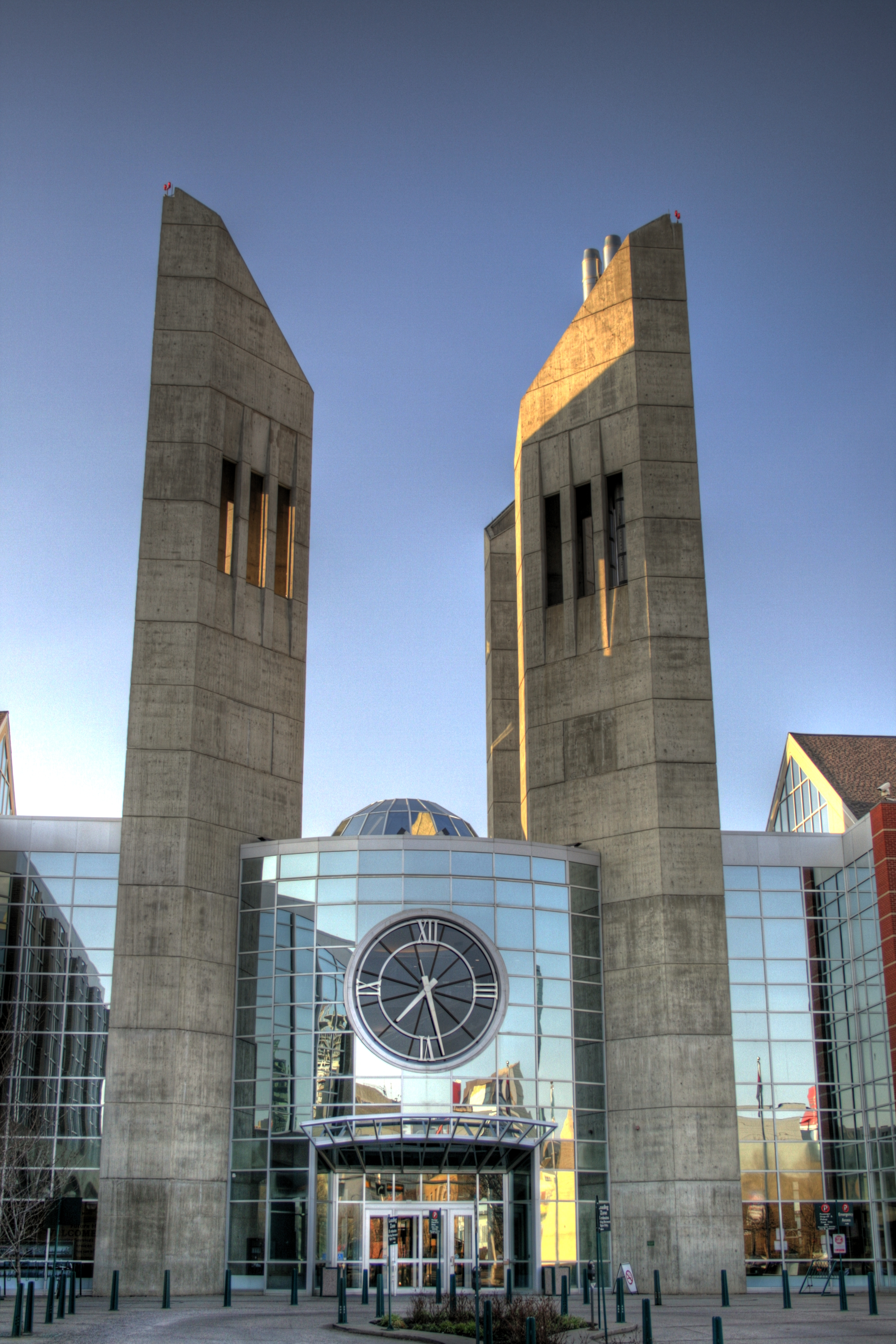
Main entrance of MacEwan City Centre Campus

Inside of Allard Hall at MacEwan University

City Centre Campus houses the majority of MacEwan University's degree programs. The campus is also home to university courses, diplomas and certificates in health, human services and business. Most of the university's administration is located at City Centre Campus as well. The south entrance to the main complex is contained within the centremost of the three groups of concrete spires, which also contains a public clock.

The main complex consists of a long grouping of structures stretching from east to west: the 105 Street Building (Building 5), the 106 Street Building (Building 6), the 107 Street Building (Building 7), and the Centre for Sport and Wellness (Building 8). Between each of these buildings is grouping of four concrete spires which gives the campus its distinctive look. Each of these groupings of towers forms a terminating vista both when viewed from the north or the south, interrupting the streets after which the buildings are named. The towers which terminate 107 Street also feature public clock between the spires on the south face. The section of 108 Street to the south of the campus is known as "Capital Boulevard" and runs to the Alberta Legislature Building seven blocks to the south where it forms another terminating vista. A pedway over 109 Street connects these buildings to the Robbins Health Learning Centre (Building 9, 2007) and the University Service Centre above the parkade (Building 10, 2011). Another pedway connects Building 9 to Allard Hall (Building 11, 2017)

MacEwan Residence is a 13-story building and the only building not connected by pedway. In addition to a bicycle storage room, a hockey equipment storage room is also available for resident use.

The Centre for Sport and Wellness houses a pool, fitness centre, spin studio, mind/body studio, and gymnasium. It is home to the MacEwan University Griffins basketball and volleyball programs who play in the Canada West conference of U Sports. It is also the training facility for all Griffins teams including soccer, cross country and the hockey teams who compete out of the Downtown Community Arena. Sport and Wellness was also used as the home of the Edmonton Chill, later the Edmonton Energy of the International Basketball League, for two seasons (2008 and 2009).

In 2017, the university began construction of a 50,000 square foot student union building next to the Centre for Sport and Wellness. The building is three stories tall, and held its official opening in January 2020.

Allard Hall located on the west most side of the MacEwan downtown campus was completed and opened in September 2017. It is a 420,000 square foot building that houses the Faculty of Fine Arts and Communications.

May 9, 2024, was the groundbreaking for the new building, home to the Triffo School of Business. Featuring 30 classrooms, 20 collaborative spaces, and 15 study areas. The building will have approximately 376,000 square feet and is stated to be open and completed by the 2027 winter term.

== Former campuses ==
The university's South Campus, located in Mill Woods, closed in 2014, with all of its programs relocated to City Centre Campus. The Centre for the Arts and Culture (CAC) campus was located on the west end of the city in West Jasper Place. CAC closed in 2017 when MacEwan relocated the Faculty of Fine Arts and Communications to Allard Hall at City Centre Campus.

The Centre for the Arts and Communications (formerly known as Jasper Place Campus) was located in Edmonton's west end on the north east corner of 156 Street and 100 Avenue. The Centre for the Arts and Communications (CFAC) housed several creative programs in arts and cultural management, design, fine art, communications, music, theatre arts and theatre production, including MacEwan University's Bachelor of Music in Jazz and Contemporary Popular Music. In the fall of 2017, all CFAC programs and operations were relocated to a new building located on MacEwan's City Centre Campus. The building is approximately 430,000 square feet in size and connect via pedway to the Robbins Health Learning Centre.

In June 2000, the Government of Alberta assumed control of the formerly private Alberta College. Alberta College was then incorporated as a MacEwan campus. Alberta College is only 1 km from the City Centre Campus, and houses academic upgrading, music and English as a Second Language (ESL) programs. In 2019, MacEwan University sold the Alberta College Campus to the Edmonton Public School Board (EPSB) as part of a wider campus-consolidation strategy. Since fall 2020, the Alberta College Campus has been the home for Centre High, a specialized EPSB program for 4th and 5th year high school students who are pursuing academic upgrading.

== Arms ==
Coat of arms of
Adopted Granted 20 May 2010 Crest A sparrow wings elevated and addorsed perched on a walking-staff fesswise Proper. Escutcheon Azure on a rose Argent a plate fimbriated Azure. Supporters Two griffins per fess Azure and Argent beaked and membered Argent standing on a compartment of prairie grass set with wild roses Proper. Motto Discendo Floremus (We Flourish by Learning) Badge On a plate fimbriated Azure a griffin's head erased Azure. Escutcheon
