= Mira Spivak =

Canadian politician (born 1934)

The Honourable Mira Spivak

Canadian Senator from Manitoba
- In office 17 November 1986 – 12 July 2009
- Appointed by: Brian Mulroney

Personal details
- Born: Mira Steele; 12 July 1934 (age 92) Rovno, Poland
- Party: Conservative (1986-2004)
- Other political affiliations: Independent (2004-2009)
- Spouse: Sidney Spivak (m. 1955)
- Children: 3
- Education: University of Manitoba (BA)

Mira Spivak (née Steele; born 12 July 1934) is a former member of the Canadian Senate representing the province of Manitoba.

== Early life and education ==
Born in Rivne, Ukraine (then in Poland), Spivak received a Bachelor of Arts, Honours Degree in Political Science and Philosophy from the University of Manitoba.

== Political career ==
She was appointed to the Senate on the recommendation of then-Prime Minister Brian Mulroney in 1986 as a Progressive Conservative (PC). She refused to join the Conservative Party of Canada when the PC Party merged with the Canadian Alliance in 2003 and subsequently left the Conservative caucus to sit in the Senate as an independent on 3 February 2004.

Spivak holds liberal views on most social issues. She allowed her name to be used on a full-page pro-choice advertisement that ran in the Winnipeg Free Press on 11 October 1989.

In 2006, she supported Elizabeth May in her successful campaign to win the leadership of the Green Party of Canada.

Spivak retired from the Senate on 12 July 2009, upon reaching the mandatory retirement age of 75. She is the widow of Manitoba politician Sidney Spivak.
