= Annette Trimbee =

- Trimbee in 2021

6th President of MacEwan University
- In office 1 August 2020 – Present
- Preceded by: John McGrath (Acting)

7th President and Vice-Chancellor of the University of Winnipeg
- In office August 1, 2014 – August 1, 2020
- Chancellor: Bob Silver
- Preceded by: Lloyd Axworthy
- Succeeded by: James Currie (acting)

Alberta Deputy Minister of Service Alberta
- In office September 2013 – July 2014
- Minister: Manmeet Bhullar; Doug Griffiths

Alberta Deputy Minister of Treasury Board and Finance
- In office May 2012 – September 2013
- Minister: Doug Horner

Alberta Deputy Minister of Treasury Board and Enterprise
- In office October 2011 – May 2012

Alberta Deputy Minister of Advanced Education and Technology
- In office March 2008 – October 2011
- Minister: Doug Horner; Greg Weadick

Personal details
- Born: 1955 or 1956 (age 70–71) Winnipeg, Manitoba, Canada
- Education: McMaster University; University of Manitoba; University of Winnipeg

Annette Trimbee is a Canadian civil servant who is the sixth president and vice-chancellor of MacEwan University. Prior to her appointment, she was the seventh president and vice-chancellor of the University of Winnipeg and spent several years as a deputy minister in the Government of Alberta.

== Life ==
Trimbee graduated from the University of Winnipeg in 1977 with a Bachelor of Science. In 1980, she completed her MSc from the University of Manitoba, after which, in 1984 she earned a PhD from McMaster University. On August 1, 2014, Trimbee was named the 6th president of the University of Winnipeg. Trimbee made Indigenization a key policy of her presidency. In 2016, with the support of the student union, she instituted the Indigenous course requirement, which requires students, regardless of their interests or disciplines, to take a certain number of credits focusing on Indigenous content. At the time, this made the University of Winnipeg one of two post-secondary institutions in Canada with any such requirement. Under her direction, the University also began incorporating Indigenous cultural elements in convocation ceremonies, and began performing land acknowledgments. In 2016, while still president of the University, she became a board member of Manitoba Hydro. She resigned from her board position in 2018. On March 3, 2020, Trimbee resigned from her position at the University of Winnipeg, taking up the presidency at MacEwan University.

Trimbee has identified herself as Metis since 2014, and is a member of the Manitoba Metis Federation.

Academic offices
Preceded by Lloyd Axworthy	President and Vice-Chancellor of the University of Winnipeg; August 1, 2014 – August 1, 2020	Succeeded by James Currie (acting)
