= Deborah Saucier =

President of Vancouver Island University
- In office 2019 – April 4, 2025
- Preceded by: Ralph Nilson
- Succeeded by: Emily Huner (acting)

President of MacEwan University
- In office July 1, 2017 – July 3, 2019

Personal details
- Born: Saskatoon, Saskatchewan, Canada
- Citizenship: Otipemisiwak Métis Government; Canada
- Children: 1
- Education: University of Victoria; University of Western Ontario

Deborah Saucier is a Métis Canadian neuroscientist and academic administrator who served as president of Vancouver Island University from 2019 to 2025 and MacEwan University from 2017 to 2019.

== Life ==
Saucier was born in Saskatoon and is a member of the Otipemisiwak Métis Government. She graduated from Pearson College UWC in 1985. Saucier completed a bachelor's degree in 1988 and master's degree in 1990, both in psychology at University of Victoria. She earned a Ph.D. in psychology from University of Western Ontario.

Saucier is a neuroscientist. She was an academic, provost, and vice-president at Ontario Tech University. On July 1, 2017, Saucier became president of MacEwan University. She served in the role until July 3, 2019 when she resigned to become the president and vice-chancellor of Vancouver Island University (VIU) on July 4. She succeeded Ralph Nilson. Following pressure from students and faculty, Saucier resigned from VIU on April 4, 2025. She was its first female and Métis identifying person to serve as president of VIU. She was succeeded by acting president Emily Huner.

Saucier is married to Chai Duncan, a curator and contemporary artist. They have a daughter.
