= United College, Waterloo =

University College affiliated with the University of Waterloo in Ontario, Canada

Coordinates: 43°28′04″N 80°32′47″W

United College
- Former name: St. Paul's United College (1963–2005); St. Paul's University College (2005–2022)
- Motto: Bringing People Together
- Type: Public
- Established: 1962
- Affiliations: University of Waterloo
- Chancellor: Michaëlle Jean
- Principal: Richard Myers
- Undergraduates: 340
- Postgraduates: 80
- Location: Waterloo, ON, Canada
- Campus: Urban/Suburban – 6 acres
- Colours: United Blue, Black and White
- Nicknames: UTD, STP, SPUC
- Website: uwaterloo.ca/united-college

United College is a university college affiliated with the University of Waterloo in Waterloo, Ontario, Canada. The college, previously known as St. Paul's United College and St. Paul's University College, contributes to the University of Waterloo by offering academic programming as well as accommodation for both graduate and undergraduate students. The college also is the site of co-curricular programming for University of Waterloo students such as GreenHouse, the Waterloo Indigenous Student Centre, and the Student Refugee Program.

== History ==
The college was founded by the United Church of Canada in 1962 as St. Paul's United College. It opened its doors to students in 1963. The Church and the college agreed to end their formal relationship in 2005 and the name of the institution was changed to St. Paul's University College. In 2022, the name of the institution was changed to United College.

== Residences ==
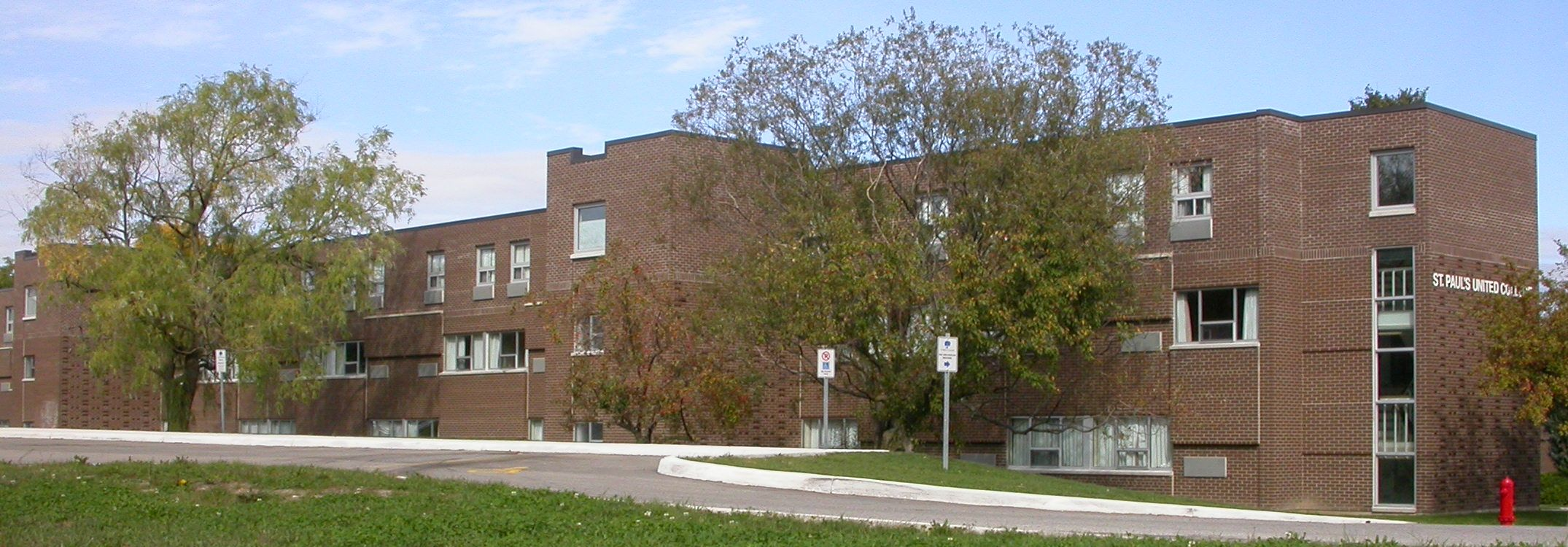
United College undergraduate residence building

The undergraduate residences at United College are home to approximately 340 students from the University of Waterloo, drawn from all faculties. The majority of undergraduate residents are in first-year and almost all first-year students are accommodated in double rooms. The undergraduate residences host a number of living-learning communities that cluster students by academic interest. The college currently has residential clusters focused on Human Rights, Environment, Women-in-Engineering, and Financial Assessment and Risk Management. There are also special residence communities for Indigenous students and for those who wish to speak French.

United College is also home to an apartment building for graduate students at the University of Waterloo. The building has approximately eighty units and hosts Master's and PhD students from all faculties.

== Academic programs ==
Through its agreement of affiliation with the University of Waterloo, United College hosts academic programs in Canadian Studies, Indigenous Studies, Human Rights, and Indigenous Entrepreneurship. United College also shares in the delivery of University of Waterloo academic programming in International Development and Religious Studies. The common thread in the college's academic programming is the objective of bringing people together to make the world more humane and more equitable.

== Waterloo Indigenous Student Centre ==
United College hosts the Waterloo Indigenous Student Centre (WISC) for the university's Indigenous students, supporting them in a variety of ways.

== Name change and re-brand ==
In September 2022, United College formally announced its decision to re-brand from its former name, St Paul's University College. The former colour scheme, green and brown, was changed to blue and black, and the logo became a blue 'U'. The name change was motivated by the college's desire to let go of its previous religious affiliation. Principal Rick Myers announced the name change by stating, "It's a beautiful name that speaks to the inclusive values of today's College while still honouring those responsible for its founding and early development."

== Principals ==
- Rick Myers (2016–present)
- Graham Brown (1999–2016)
- Helga Mills (1994–1999)
- William Klassen (1989–1994)
- François Gerard (1978–1988)
- Alan M. McLachlin (1965–1977)
- Douglas J. Hall (1962–1965)

== Chancellors ==
- Michaelle Jean (2020 – present)
- J.P. Gladu (2017– 2020)
- Lloyd Axworthy (2014–2017)
