= Winnipeg—Fort Garry =

Former federal electoral district in Manitoba, Canada

Location of Winnipeg—Fort Garry within the Winnipeg area

Winnipeg—Fort Garry was a federal electoral district in Manitoba, Canada, that was represented in the House of Commons of Canada from 1979 to 1988. It consisted of the Fort Rouge and Fort Garry areas of Winnipeg.

This riding was created in 1976. Most of the territory from the former Winnipeg South riding transferred to this district, except for the River Heights area, which went to Winnipeg—Assiniboine. It was contested at federal elections in 1979, 1980, and 1984. For its entire history, its member of parliament was Liberal Lloyd Axworthy.

Boundary redistribution in 1987 abolished Winnipeg—Fort Garry: Fort Garry was reassigned to Winnipeg South and Fort Rouge to Winnipeg South Centre, both of which were re-formed with considerably different territory than prior to the federal election of 1979. Axworthy continued to serve as MP for Winnipeg South Centre from the 1988 federal election until he retired from Parliament in 2000.

== Election results ==
1979 Canadian federal election
Party	Candidate	Votes	%
Liberal	Lloyd Axworthy	18,822	41.13
Progressive Conservative	Sidney Spivak	18,337	40.07
New Democratic	Vivian Rachlis	8,176	17.87
Social Credit	Tony Reznowski	245	0.54
Marxist–Leninist	Douglas Michalchuk	90	0.20
Not affiliated	Larry E. Johnston	87	0.19
Total valid votes		45,757	

1980 Canadian federal election
Party	Candidate	Votes	%	±%
Liberal	Lloyd Axworthy	18,694	46.35	+5.21
Progressive Conservative	Inez Trueman	13,854	34.35	-5.73
New Democratic	Brad McKenzie	7,293	18.08	+0.21
Rhinoceros	Dave Smilin Balderstone	405	1.00	
Marxist–Leninist	Manuel Gitterman	90	0.22	+0.03
Total valid votes		40,336		
Liberal hold		Swing		+5.47

1984 Canadian federal election
Party	Candidate	Votes	%	±%
Liberal	Lloyd Axworthy	21,286	45.70	-0.64
Progressive Conservative	Bud Sherman	18,932	40.65	+6.30
New Democratic	Gail Coyston	5,932	12.74	-5.34
Libertarian	Clancy Smith	308	0.66	
Communist	Frank Goldspink	115	0.25	
Total valid votes		46,573		
Liberal hold		Swing		-3.47

== See also ==
- List of Canadian electoral districts
- Historical federal electoral districts of Canada
