= Andy Haydon =

Canadian engineer and politician (1933–2024)

Andrew Scott Haydon

2nd Regional Chair of Ottawa-Carleton
- In office 1978–1991
- Preceded by: Denis Coolican
- Succeeded by: Peter D. Clark

33rd Reeve of Nepean Township
- In office 1970–1978
- Preceded by: D. Aubrey Moodie
- Succeeded by: Position abolished

1st Mayor of Nepean
- In office 1978–1978
- Preceded by: Position created
- Succeeded by: Ben Franklin

Nepean Township Alderman
- In office 1967–1970
- Preceded by: Council expanded
- Succeeded by: Robert Mitchell and Norman Cooksey
- Constituency: At large

Personal details
- Born: February 26, 1933 Toronto, Ontario, Canada
- Died: October 28, 2024 (aged 91)
- Party: Progressive Conservative Party of Canada (1978)
- Spouse(s): Mary Emily Leishman (m. 1960; died 2003); Sherrell Jeanette Franklin (née Willman) (m. 2007)
- Children: 4

Andrew Scott Haydon (February 26, 1933 – October 28, 2024) was a Canadian engineer and politician. He was reeve of Nepean Township, Ontario from 1970 to 1978 and Regional Chair of Ottawa-Carleton from 1978–1991. Haydon was the first mayor of the city of Nepean when it incorporated on November 24, 1978; Ben Franklin assumed the title six days later.

== Early life ==
Haydon was born in 1933 to Gladys Connelly and Andrew Scott Haydon (Sr.), at the Private Patients Pavilion at the Toronto General Hospital. The elder Haydon was the son of Andrew Haydon, who was a Liberal member of the Senate of Canada from 1924 to 1932. The family came to Ottawa, Ontario when the younger Andrew was six. He attended Queen's University in Kingston, Ontario where he received a degree in chemical engineering. After graduating, he studied in England for a year before settling in Cornwall, Ontario, where he managed a textile mill. He moved to Nepean Township in 1961 to become a patent examiner in the Department of Consumer and Corporate Affairs.

== Political career ==
Haydon was elected in 1966 to the Nepean Township council, after it was expanded to five aldermen from three. In 1969, he was elected reeve of Nepean. He defeated the incumbent reeve D. Aubrey Moodie in a landslide with 66% of the vote, thanks in part to voters in the urban parts of the township being unhappy with a tax increase attributed to Moodie. The Nepean Sportsplex and National Capital Equestrian Park were built during Haydon's term as reeve.

Originally thought of as a Liberal, Haydon ran for the Progressive Conservative Party of Canada nomination in the riding of Ottawa West in April 1978, ahead of the 1979 Canadian federal election. Haydon lost the nomination on the first ballot, losing 771 votes to 593 against Ken Binks, who went on to win the seat.

Following the 1978 municipal elections, Haydon ran for the position of regional chair of Ottawa-Carleton, defeating Rideau Township reeve Bill Tupper in a 17–13 vote of regional councillors. Haydon's win was attributed to the 'leftist vote' on council backing Tupper (including Ottawa mayor Marion Dewar), which dissuaded the council's more right leaning members from doing the same. Haydon would go on to serve as chair for 13 years, helping to introduce Ottawa's Transitway, Ottawa City Hall (then the Regional Offices), and the Robert O. Pickard Environmental Centre. He failed however in his plans to establish a second Greenbelt in the city as well as his dreams of establishing Ottawa as a federal capital district.

After retiring from politics, he ran a bed and breakfast with his wife.

== Attempted comeback in politics ==
In September 2006, Haydon unexpectedly announced his candidacy in the new suburban ward of Gloucester-South Nepean, 15 years after his retirement from politics. He was defeated by Steve Desroches in the 2006 municipal elections. Following the election, he came a special adviser to mayor Larry O'Brien. However, he would later criticize O'Brien's mayoralty, calling his fiscal record "a tragic case of irresponsible and extravagant expenditures unmatched in the history of Ottawa". In September 2010, Haydon announced his candidacy for mayor of Ottawa, about six weeks before the date of the election. He finished fourth with 18,914 votes, or 7% of the total ballots.

== Personal life and death ==
Haydon had four children with his first wife, Mary Leishman. The two met in around 1958 and married in 1960 at the St. Joseph Catholic Church in Ottawa. She died in 2003 at the age of 66. The family lived in Bells Corners, then Qualicum-Graham Park and then in a mansion on Queen Elizabeth Driveway which was called "Haydon House" where Mary ran a bed and breakfast. The family also had a cottage on Danford Lake near Kazabazua, Quebec.

In 2007, Haydon married Sherry Franklin, the widow of Ben Franklin, Haydon's successor as mayor of Nepean.

Haydon died on October 28, 2024, at the age of 91.

== Honours ==
Andrew Haydon Park on the Ottawa River and Andrew Haydon Hall, the city council chambers at Ottawa City Hall, were named after him. Carleton University offers a scholarship in his name each year to a student in an engineering program.
