= Carleton (Ontario federal electoral district) =

Federal electoral district in Ontario, Canada

Coordinates: 45.169°N 75.637°W

Ontario electoral district
- Interactive map of riding boundaries from the 2025 federal election

Federal electoral district
- Legislature: House of Commons
MP
Bruce Fanjoy
Liberal
- District created: 1867
- First contested: 1867
- Last contested: 2025
- District webpage: profile, map

Demographics
- Population (2021): 124,416
- Electors (2015): 71,947
- Area (km²): 1,988.6
- Pop. density (per km²): 62.6
- Census division: Ottawa
- Census subdivision: Ottawa (part)

Carleton is a federal electoral district in Ontario, Canada, represented in the House of Commons of Canada from 1867 to 1968 and since 2015. It was represented in the Legislative Assembly of Upper Canada from 1821 to 1840 and in the Legislative Assembly of the Province of Canada from 1841 until 1866. It is currently represented by Bruce Fanjoy, who defeated Conservative Party leader Pierre Poilievre in 2025.

Religion in Carleton (2021, Based on 2013 Representation Order)
1. Christian (57.2%)
2. Muslim (8.10%)
3. Hindu (2.00%)
4. Buddhist (1.00%)
5. Sikh (0.90%)
6. Other (0.90%)
7. Irreligious (29.9%)

== Demographics ==
According to the 2021 Canadian census

Languages: 68.6% English, 7.0% French, 3.8% Arabic, 2.1% Mandarin, 1.0% Spanish
Religions: 57.2% Christian (31.3% Catholic, 5.5% Anglican, 5.1% United Church, 2.0% Christian Orthodox, 1.3% Presbyterian, 1.0% Pentecostal, 11.0% Other), 8.1% Muslim, 2.0% Hindu, 1.0% Buddhist, 0.9% Sikh, 0.9% Other, 29.9% None
Median income: $58,400 (2020)
Average income: $72,300 (2020)

Panethnic groups in Carleton (2011−2021)
Panethnic group	2021		2016		2011	
Panethnic group	Pop.	%	Pop.	%	Pop.	%
European (Note: Statistic includes all persons that did not make up part of a visible minority or an indigenous identity.)	95,190	72.85%	84,600	83%	77,900	87.75%
Middle Eastern (Note: Statistic includes total responses of "West Asian" and "Arab" under visible minority section on census.)	7,965	6.1%	3,720	3.65%	1,785	2.01%
South Asian	7,750	5.93%	2,735	2.68%	1,745	1.97%
East Asian (Note: Statistic includes total responses of "Chinese", "Korean", and "Japanese" under visible minority section on census.)	6,105	4.67%	3,220	3.16%	2,090	2.35%
African	4,980	3.81%	2,615	2.57%	1,395	1.57%
Indigenous	3,315	2.54%	2,320	2.28%	1,570	1.77%
Southeast Asian (Note: Statistic includes total responses of "Filipino" and "Southeast Asian" under visible minority section on census.)	2,685	2.05%	1,425	1.4%	1,210	1.36%
Latin American	1,295	0.99%	655	0.64%	675	0.76%
Other/multiracial (Note: Statistic includes total responses of "Visible minority, n.i.e." and "Multiple visible minorities" under visible minority section on census.)	1,390	1.06%	640	0.63%	420	0.47%
Total responses	130,660	99.46%	101,930	99.04%	88,775	99.17%
Total population	131,375	100%	102,918	100%	89,522	100%
Notes: Totals greater than 100% due to multiple origin responses. Demographics based on 2012 Canadian federal electoral redistribution riding boundaries.

== History ==
The original riding was created by the British North America Act 1867. However, the riding had existed since 1821 in the Parliament of Upper Canada and the Parliament of the Province of Canada. It originally consisted of parts of Carleton County.

=== Members of Parliament of Upper Canada ===
(returned two members from 1831 to 1840)

1. William Morris (1821–1825)
2. George Thew Burke (1825–1829)
3. Thomas Mabon Radenhurst (1829–1831)
4. Hamnett Kirkes Pinhey (1831) and John Bower Lewis (1831–1840)
5. George Lyon (1831–1835)
6. Edward Malloch (1835–1840)

=== Members of Parliament of the Province of Canada ===
1. James Johnston, Reformer (1841–1846)
2. George Lyon, Conservative (1846–1848)
3. Edward Malloch (1848–1854)
4. William F. Powell, Conservative (1854–1866)

=== 1867–1966 ===
The federal riding consisted initially of Carleton County. In 1882, it was redefined to consist of the townships of Nepean, North Gower, Marlboro, March, Torbolton and Goulbourn, and the village of Richmond. In 1903, it was redefined to consist of the county of Carleton, excluding the city of Ottawa and the townships of Gloucester and Osgoode.

In 1914, it was redefined to include parts of the city of Ottawa not included in either the electoral district of Ottawa or Rideau Ward of Ottawa.

In 1924, it was redefined as consisting of the county of Carleton, excluding the townships of Gloucester and Osgoode and that part of the city of Ottawa lying east of a line drawn from south to north along the Canadian Pacific Railway line, Somerset Street, Bayswater Avenue, Bayview Road, and Mason Street to the Ottawa River.

In 1933, it was redefined as consisting of the county of Carleton, excluding the township of Gloucester, the town of Eastview, the village of Rockcliffe Park and the part of the city of Ottawa lying east of Parkdale Avenue.

In 1947, it was redefined as consisting of the county of Carleton, excluding the township of Gloucester, the town of Eastview and the village of Rockcliffe Park, and including the parts of Victoria and Elmdale wards in the city of Ottawa west of Parkdale Avenue, the part of Dalhousie ward south of Carling Avenue, the part of Capital ward south of Carling Avenue and Linden Terrace, and the part of Riverdale ward south of Riverdale Avenue and west of Main Street.

In 1952, it was redefined as consisting of the county of Carleton (excluding the township of Gloucester, the town of Eastview and the village of Rockcliffe Park), and the part of the city of Ottawa west of a line drawn from north to south along Parkdale Avenue, east along Carling Avenue, north along O'Connor Street, east along Linden Terrace to the Rideau Canal, south along the canal, east along Echo Drive, northeast along Riverdale Avenue, south along Main Street, southwest along the Rideau River.

The electoral district was abolished in 1966 when it was redistributed between Grenville—Carleton, Lanark and Renfrew, Ottawa Centre, Ottawa West and Ottawa—Carleton ridings.

=== Riding revival (2012) ===
The riding was recreated in 2015 by the 2012 federal electoral boundaries redistribution and was legally defined in the 2013 representation order. Initially, the riding was known as Rideau—Carleton. 40.58% of the riding came from the riding of Carleton—Mississippi Mills, 59.37% from Nepean—Carleton and 0.04% from Ottawa South. The core of the riding came from the more rural eastern portion of the old Nepean—Carleton. It came into effect upon the call of the 2015 Canadian federal election held in October of that year.

=== 2022 Federal redistribution ===
The 2022 Canadian federal electoral redistribution resulted in much of the riding's few urban polls being swapped for other rural areas within the City of Ottawa. The area north of Hazeldean Road was reassigned to the new Kanata riding. The largely rural portions west of the 417 and north of Craig's Side Road / Murphy Side Road / Constance Lake Road / Berry Side Road added from Kanata—Carleton. This included several rural communities, namely Fitzroy Harbour, Dunrobin, Kinburn and Constance Bay. Another rural area (south of Bells Corners, west of the 416 and south of Barnsdale Road) was added to the riding from the Nepean riding. In the east, parts of Orléans and Glengarry—Prescott—Russell south of Highway 417 and within the city of Ottawa, and that part of Ottawa South south of the 417 and Hunt Club Road and east of Hawthorne Road, were moved into the riding. And finally, the Findlay Creek area was reallocated to Ottawa South.

=== Members of Parliament ===
This riding has elected the following members of Parliament:

Carleton
Parliament	Years	Member	Party
1st	1867–1872	John Holmes	Liberal–Conservative
2nd	1872–1874	John Rochester	Conservative
3rd	1874–1878	John Rochester	Conservative
4th	1878–1882	John Rochester	Conservative
5th	1882–1887	John A. Macdonald	Liberal–Conservative
6th	1887–1888	John A. Macdonald	Liberal–Conservative
6th	1888–1891	George Lemuel Dickinson	Conservative
7th	1891–1896	William Thomas Hodgins	Conservative
8th	1896–1900	William Thomas Hodgins	Conservative
9th	1900–1904	Edward Kidd	Conservative
10th	1904–1905	Edward Kidd	Conservative
10th	1905–1908	Robert Borden	Conservative
11th	1908–1909	Robert Borden	Conservative
11th	1909–1911	Edward Kidd	Conservative
12th	1911–1912	Edward Kidd	Conservative
12th	1912–1917	William Foster Garland	Conservative
13th	1917–1921	George Boyce	Government (Unionist)
14th	1921–1925	William Foster Garland	Conservative
15th	1925–1926	William Foster Garland	Conservative
16th	1926–1930	William Foster Garland	Conservative
17th	1930–1935	William Foster Garland	Conservative
18th	1935–1940	Alonzo Hyndman	Conservative
19th	1940–1940	Alonzo Hyndman	National Government
19th	1940–1945	George Russell Boucher	Conservative
20th	1945–1948	George Russell Boucher	Progressive Conservative
20th	1948–1949	George A. Drew	Progressive Conservative
21st	1949–1953	George A. Drew	Progressive Conservative
22nd	1953–1957	George A. Drew	Progressive Conservative
23rd	1957–1958	Dick Bell	Progressive Conservative
24th	1958–1962	Dick Bell	Progressive Conservative
25th	1962–1963	Dick Bell	Progressive Conservative
26th	1963–1965	Lloyd Francis	Liberal
27th	1965–1968	Dick Bell	Progressive Conservative
Riding dissolved into Grenville—Carleton, Lanark and Renfrew, Ottawa Centre, Ottawa West, and Ottawa—Carleton
Riding re-created from Carleton—Mississippi Mills, Nepean—Carleton, and Ottawa South
42nd	2015–2019	Pierre Poilievre	Conservative
43rd	2019–2021	Pierre Poilievre	Conservative
44th	2021–2025	Pierre Poilievre	Conservative
45th	2025–present	Bruce Fanjoy	Liberal

== Election results ==
=== Carleton, 2015–present ===
The Carleton riding was targeted by the Longest Ballot Committee in the 2025 Canadian federal election, resulting in a total of 91 candidates in the riding.

2025 Canadian federal election
Party	Candidate	Votes	%	±%
Liberal	Bruce Fanjoy	43,846	50.95	+19.09
Conservative	Pierre Poilievre	39,333	45.70	−6.15
New Democratic	Beth Prokaska	1,221	1.42	−9.95
Green	Mark Watson	561	0.65	−1.49
United	Karen Bourdeau	112	0.13	N/A
Canadian Future	Shawn MacEachern	63	0.07	N/A
Independent	Lorant Polya	57	0.07	
Independent	Scott Falkingham	45	0.05	
Independent	Sana Ahmad	41	0.05	
Independent	Pierre Gauthier	38	0.04	
Marijuana	Danny Légaré	37	0.04	N/A
Independent	Guillaume Paradis	37	0.04	
Independent	Dan Kyung	35	0.04	
Rhinoceros	Sébastien CoRhino	31	0.04	N/A
Independent	Sarah Burke	27	0.03	
Independent	Mark Moutter	23	0.03	
Independent	David Zhu	21	0.02	
Independent	Charlie Currie	20	0.02	
Independent	John Dale	20	0.02	
Independent	Euan Fraser Tait	18	0.02	
Independent	John Boylan	17	0.02	
Independent	Mélodie Anderson	16	0.02	
Independent	Alex Banks	16	0.02	
Independent	Michael Bednarski	15	0.02	
Independent	David Nguyen	15	0.02	
Independent	Sophie Bearden	14	0.02	
Independent	Seyed Hosseini Lavasani	13	0.02	
No affiliation	Jeani Boudreault	12	0.01	
Independent	Alexandra Engering	12	0.01	
Independent	Lajos Polya	12	0.01	
No affiliation	Darcy Vanderwater	12	0.01	
Independent	Jenny Cartwright	11	0.01	
Independent	Jeffrey Goodman	11	0.01	
Independent	Donald McKay	11	0.01	
Independent	Daniel Stuckless	11	0.01	
Independent	Maria Gabriel	10	0.01	
No affiliation	Laina Kohler	10	0.01	
Independent	Charles Lemieux	10	0.01	
Independent	Marthalee Aykroyd	9	0.01	
Independent	Ryan Huard	9	0.01	
Independent	Sarah Thompson	9	0.01	
Independent	Alain Bourgault	8	0.01	
Independent	Daniel Gagnon	8	0.01	
Independent	Robert Harris	8	0.01	
Independent	Andrea Hollinger	8	0.01	
Independent	Connie Lukawski	8	0.01	
Independent	John Francis O'Flynn	8	0.01	
Independent	Peter Gorman	7	0.01	
Independent	Julian Selody	7	0.01	
Independent	Michal Wieczorek	7	0.01	
Independent	Line Bélanger	6	0.01	
Independent	Blake Hamilton	6	0.01	
Independent	Loren Hicks	6	0.01	
No affiliation	Alexander Lein	6	0.01	
Independent	Agnieszka Marszalek	6	0.01	
Independent	Hakim Sheriff	6	0.01	
Independent	Tetia Bayoro	5	0.01	
Independent	David Cherniak	5	0.01	
Independent	Kevin Krisa	5	0.01	
Independent	Alain Lamontagne	5	0.01	
Independent	Winston Neutel	5	0.01	
Independent	Lény Painchaud	5	0.01	
Independent	Elliot Wand	5	0.01	
Independent	Dante Camarena Jimenez	4	0.00	
Independent	Jaël Champagne Gareau	4	0.00	
Independent	Gerrit Dogger	4	0.00	
Independent	Gregory Gillis	4	0.00	
No affiliation	Christopher Navarro-Canseco	4	0.00	
Independent	Lanna Palsson	4	0.00	
Independent	Spencer Rocchi	4	0.00	
Independent	Patrick Strzalkowski	4	0.00	
No affiliation	Manon Marie Lili Desbiens	3	0.00	
Independent	Artem Gudkov	3	0.00	
No affiliation	Kerri Hildebrandt	3	0.00	
Independent	Trevor Holsworth	3	0.00	
No affiliation	Krzysztof Krzywinski	3	0.00	
Independent	Samuel Lafontaine	3	0.00	
Independent	Roger Sherwood	3	0.00	
Independent	Yogo Shimada	3	0.00	
Independent	Michael Skirzynski	3	0.00	
Independent	Julie St-Amand	3	0.00	
Independent	Daniel Graham	2	0.00	
Independent	Zornitsa Halacheva	2	0.00	
Independent	Anthony Hamel	2	0.00	
Independent	Demetrios Karavas	2	0.00	
Independent	Sheri Oberman	2	0.00	
Independent	Wallace Richard Rowat	2	0.00	
Independent	Pascal St-Amand	2	0.00	
Independent	Benjamin Teichman	2	0.00	
Independent	Joseph Maw	1	0.00	
No affiliation	Ysack Dupont	0	0.00	
Total valid votes		86,060	99.31	
Total rejected ballots		595	0.69	+0.14
Turnout		86,655	81.36	+5.54
Eligible voters		106,504		
Liberal notional gain from Conservative		Swing		+12.62
Source: Elections Canada

2021 federal election redistributed results
Party	Vote	%
Conservative	36,534	51.86
Liberal	22,448	31.86
New Democratic	8,012	11.37
People's	1,939	2.75
Green	1,512	2.15
Free	7	0.01
Total valid votes	70,452	99.45
Rejected ballots	390	0.55
Registered voters/ estimated turnout	93,425	75.83

2021 Canadian federal election
Party	Candidate	Votes	%	±%	Expenditures
Conservative	Pierre Poilievre	35,356	49.9	+3.55	$108,590.73
Liberal	Gustave Roy	24,298	34.3	−3.93	$91,061.91
New Democratic	Kevin Hua	8,164	11.5	+2.16	$3,138.40
People's	Peter Crawley	1,728	2.4	+1.26	$1,053.55
Green	Nira Dookeran	1,327	1.9	−3.04	$2,403.07
Total valid votes/expense limit		70,873	99.37	—	$122,996.20
Total rejected ballots		447	0.63	+0.03	
Turnout		71,320	74.57	−2.61	
Eligible voters		95,639			
Conservative hold		Swing		+3.74	
Source: Elections Canada

2019 Canadian federal election
Party	Candidate	Votes	%	±%	Expenditures
Conservative	Pierre Poilievre	32,147	46.35	−0.51	$95,365.47
Liberal	Chris Rodgers	26,518	38.23	−5.51	$106,000.32
New Democratic	Kevin Hua	6,479	9.34	+3.21	$2,169.60
Green	Gordon Kubanek	3,423	4.94	+1.68	$5,330.23
People's	Alain Musende	792	1.14	–	none listed
Total valid votes/expense limit		69,359	100		
Total rejected ballots		408	0.60	+0.27	
Turnout		67,767	77.18	−3.77	
Eligible voters		87,807			
Conservative hold		Swing		+2.50	
Source: Elections Canada

2015 Canadian federal election
Party	Candidate	Votes	%	±%	Expenditures
Conservative	Pierre Poilievre	27,762	46.86	−14.81	$166,805.35
Liberal	Chris Rodgers	25,913	43.74	+22.88	$101,336.54
New Democratic	KC Larocque	3,632	6.13	−7.22	$17,692.44
Green	Deborah Coyne	1,932	3.26	−0.86	$15,632.31
Total valid votes/expense limit		59,239	100.00		$206,141.87
Total rejected ballots		196	0.33	–	
Turnout		59,435	80.95	–	
Eligible voters		73,418			
Conservative notional hold		Swing		−18.84	
Source(s) Elections Canada – Confirmed candidates for Carleton, 30 September 2015; Elections Canada – Preliminary Election Expenses Limits for Candidates

2011 federal election redistributed results
Party	Vote	%
Conservative	28,928	61.67
Liberal	9,786	20.86
New Democratic	6,262	13.35
Green	1,932	4.11

=== Carleton, 1867–1968 ===
View source data.
Graph of election results in Carleton (1896–1968, minor parties that never got 2% of the vote or didn't run consistently are omitted)

1965 Canadian federal election
Party	Candidate	Votes	%	±%
Progressive Conservative	Dick Bell	32,456	43.90	–2.39
Liberal	Lloyd Francis	31,523	42.64	–5.37
New Democratic	Donald V. Stirling	9,953	13.46	+8.79
Total valid votes		73,932	100.0	
Progressive Conservative gain from Liberal		Swing		+1.49

1963 Canadian federal election
Party	Candidate	Votes	%	±%
Liberal	Lloyd Francis	32,325	48.01	+6.02
Progressive Conservative	Dick Bell	31,168	46.29	–5.40
New Democratic	Lewis Hanley	3,144	4.67	–0.19
Social Credit	Harold Herbert Splett	699	1.04	–0.44
Total valid votes		67,336	100.0	
Liberal gain from Progressive Conservative		Swing		+5.71

1962 Canadian federal election
Party	Candidate	Votes	%	±%
Progressive Conservative	Dick Bell	32,125	51.66	–15.81
Liberal	Lloyd Francis	26,109	41.99	+13.86
New Democratic	Lewis Hanley	3,024	4.86	+1.20
Social Credit	Harold Herbert Splett	922	1.48	+0.75
Total valid votes		62,180	100.0	
Progressive Conservative hold		Swing		–14.84

1958 Canadian federal election
Party	Candidate	Votes	%	±%
Progressive Conservative	Dick Bell	32,741	67.47	+5.69
Liberal	George Humble	13,652	28.13	–5.79
Co-operative Commonwealth	Stewart I. Crawford	1,777	3.66	+0.70
Social Credit	Grace Gough	355	0.73	–0.62
Total valid votes		48,525	100.0	
Progressive Conservative hold		Swing		+5.74

1957 Canadian federal election
Party	Candidate	Votes	%	±%
Progressive Conservative	Dick Bell	27,865	61.78	+6.53
Liberal	Frank Egan Dunlap	15,298	33.92	–6.34
Co-operative Commonwealth	Stewart I. Crawford	1,334	2.96	+0.01
Social Credit	Eric Kingsley Fallis	607	1.35	–0.19
Total valid votes		45,104	100.0	
Progressive Conservative hold		Swing		+6.44

1953 Canadian federal election
Party	Candidate	Votes	%	±%
Progressive Conservative	George Drew	20,137	55.25	+2.26
Liberal	John H. McDonald	14,676	40.26	–0.45
Co-operative Commonwealth	Stewart I. Crawford	1,075	2.95	–3.35
Social Credit	Eric Kingsley Fallis	562	1.54	
Total valid votes		36,450	100.0	
Progressive Conservative hold		Swing		+1.36

1949 Canadian federal election
Party	Candidate	Votes	%	±%
Progressive Conservative	George Drew	18,141	52.99	–23.28
Liberal	John H. McDonald	13,937	40.71	
Co-operative Commonwealth	Eugene Forsey	2,155	6.30	–14.63
Total valid votes		34,233	100.0	
Progressive Conservative hold		Swing		–32.00

Canadian federal by-election, 20 December 1948 On the resignation of G. Russell Boucher, 1 November 1948
Party	Candidate	Votes	%	±%
Progressive Conservative	George Drew	12,284	76.27	+14.01
Co-operative Commonwealth	Eugene Forsey	3,371	20.93	+13.46
Social Credit	J. Nelson McCracken	451	2.80	
Total valid votes		16,106	100.0	
Progressive Conservative hold		Swing		+0.28

1945 Canadian federal election
Party	Candidate	Votes	%	±%
Progressive Conservative	G. Russell Boucher	10,916	62.26	–18.04
Liberal	Leonard Anthony Davis	5,309	30.28	
Co-operative Commonwealth	Douglas D. Irwin	1,309	7.47	
Total valid votes		17,534	100.0	
Progressive Conservative hold		Swing		–24.16

Canadian federal by-election, 19 August 1940 On the death of Alonzo Hyndman, 9 April 1940
Party	Candidate	Votes	%	±%
Conservative	George Russell Boucher	6,045	80.30	+26.40
New Democracy	John Nelson McCracken	1,483	19.70	
Total valid votes		7,528	100.0	
Conservative hold		Swing		

1940 Canadian federal election
Party	Candidate	Votes	%	±%
National Government	Alonzo Hyndman	7,736	53.90	+11.54
Liberal	Herbert Samuel Arkell	6,617	46.10	+9.61
Total valid votes		14,353	100.0	
National Government hold		Swing		+0.96

1935 Canadian federal election
Party	Candidate	Votes	%	±%
Conservative	Alonzo Hyndman	6,872	42.36	–1.42
Liberal	Herbert Samuel Arkell	5,919	36.49	–5.56
Reconstruction	Herman Ralph James	3,431	21.15	
Total valid votes		16,222	100.0	
Conservative hold		Swing		+2.07

1930 Canadian federal election
Party	Candidate	Votes	%	±%
Conservative	William Foster Garland	7,317	43.78	–12.57
Liberal	Mortimer Newton Cummings	7,027	42.05	–1.60
Independent Conservative	Robert Ormond Morris	2,369	14.17	
Total valid votes		16,713	100.0	
Conservative hold		Swing		–5.48
Source: lop.parl.ca

1926 Canadian federal election
Party	Candidate	Votes	%	±%
Conservative	William Foster Garland	7,415	56.35	–1.09
Liberal	Mortimer Newton Cummings	5,744	43.65	+1.09
Total valid votes		13,159	100.0	
Conservative hold		Swing		–1.09

1925 Canadian federal election
Party	Candidate	Votes	%	±%
Conservative	William Foster Garland	7,757	57.44	+16.15
Liberal	Mortimer Newton Cummings	5,748	42.56	+11.67
Total valid votes		13,505	100.0	
Conservative hold		Swing		+2.24

1921 Canadian federal election
Party	Candidate	Votes	%	±%
Conservative	William Foster Garland	5,537	41.29	–25.18
Liberal	William Lochead Gourlay	4,142	30.89	–2.64
Progressive	Bower Henry	3,474	25.91	
Independent	Edward Hill Good	257	1.92	
Total valid votes		13,410	100.0	
Conservative hold		Swing		–11.27

1917 Canadian federal election
Party	Candidate	Votes	%	±%
Government (Unionist)	George Boyce	5,290	66.47	+0.33
Opposition (Laurier Liberals)	Frederick Henry Honeywell	2,669	33.53	–0.33
Total valid votes		7,959	100.0	
Government (Unionist) hold		Swing		+0.33

Canadian federal by-election, 30 October 1912 On the death of Edward Kidd, 16 September 1912
Party	Candidate	Votes
Conservative	William Foster Garland	acclaimed

1911 Canadian federal election
Party	Candidate	Votes	%	±%
Conservative	Edward Kidd	2,616	66.14	–1.14
Liberal	Donald Hector MacLean	1,339	33.86	+1.14
Total valid votes		3,955	100.0	
Conservative hold		Swing		–1.14

Canadian federal by-election, 22 February 1909 On the election of Robert Borden to Halifax and Carleton, and his choosing to sit for Halifax, 25 January 1909
Party	Candidate	Votes
Conservative	Edward Kidd	acclaimed

1908 Canadian federal election
Party	Candidate	Votes	%	±%	Elected
Conservative	Robert Borden	2,667	67.28	+3.72	✓
Liberal	James Ernest Caldwell	1,297	32.72	–3.72	
Total valid votes		3,964	100.0		
Conservative hold		Swing		+3.72	
Source(s) "Carleton, Ontario (1867-08-06 - 1968-04-22)". History of Federal Ridings Since 1867. Library of Parliament.

Canadian federal by-election, February 4, 1905 On the resignation of Edward Kidd, January 19, 1905
Party	Candidate	Votes	Elected
Conservative	Robert Borden	acclaimed	✓
Total valid votes		–	–
Source(s) "Carleton, Ontario (1867-08-06 - 1968-04-22)". History of Federal Ridings Since 1867. Library of Parliament.

1904 Canadian federal election
Party	Candidate	Votes	%	±%
Conservative	Edward Kidd	2,055	63.56	–1.01
Liberal	James E. Caldwell	1,178	36.44	+1.01
Total valid votes		3,233	100.0	
Conservative hold		Swing		–1.01

1900 Canadian federal election
Party	Candidate	Votes	%	±%
Conservative	Edward Kidd	1,611	64.57	+17.06
Liberal	John McKellar	884	35.43	–4.66
Total valid votes		2,495	100.0	
Conservative hold		Swing		+10.86

1896 Canadian federal election
Party	Candidate	Votes	%	±%
Conservative	William Thomas Hodgins	1,337	47.51	–3.22
Liberal	John McKellar	1,128	40.09	
Independent	J.S. Hendricks	299	10.63	
McCarthyite	Thomas Butler	50	1.78	
Total valid votes		2,814	100.0	
Conservative hold		Swing		

1891 Canadian federal election
Party	Candidate	Votes	%	±%
Conservative	William Thomas Hodgins	1,494	50.73	
Conservative	George Lemuel Dickinson	1,451	49.27	–12.30
Total valid votes		2,945	100.0	
Conservative hold		Swing		

Canadian federal by-election, 1 February 1888 On the election of John A. Macdonald to sit for Kingston
Party	Candidate	Votes	%	±%
Conservative	George Lemuel Dickinson	1,524	61.57	
Unknown	W. F. Powell	951	38.42	
Total valid votes		2,475	100.0	
Conservative gain from Liberal–Conservative		Swing		

1887 Canadian federal election
Party	Candidate	Votes	%
Liberal–Conservative	John A. Macdonald (incumbent)	1,691	73.62
Liberal	John K. Stewart	606	26.38
Total valid votes		2,297	
Source(s) Library of Parliament – History of Federal Ridings since 1867: Carleton

1882 Canadian federal election
Party	Candidate	Votes	%
Liberal–Conservative	John A. Macdonald	1,185	48.75
Independent Conservative	John May	629	25.87
Liberal	Erskine Henry Bronson	617	25.38
Total valid votes		2,431	
Source(s) Library of Parliament – History of Federal Ridings since 1867: Carleton

1878 Canadian federal election
Party	Candidate	Votes	%	±%
Conservative	John Rochester	1,282	49.73	+2.65
Unknown	John May	1,196	46.39	
Unknown	J. A. Grant	86	3.34	
Unknown	Nicholas Sparks Jr.	14	0.54	
Total valid votes		2,578	100.0	
Conservative hold		Swing		
Source: Canadian Elections Database

1874 Canadian federal election
Party	Candidate	Votes	%	±%
Conservative	John Rochester	870	47.08	–5.89
Unknown	John Holmes	631	34.15	–12.46
Unknown	J. Wallace	347	18.78	
Total valid votes		1,848	100.0	
Conservative hold		Swing		+3.28
Source: Canadian Elections Database

1872 Canadian federal election
Party	Candidate	Votes	%	±%
Conservative	John Rochester	1,024	52.97	+4.91
Unknown	John Holmes	901	46.61	–5.33
Unknown	William Montgomery	6	0.31	
Unknown	J. Mills	2	0.10	
Total valid votes		1,933	100.0	
Conservative gain from Liberal–Conservative		Swing		+5.12
Source: Canadian Elections Database

1867 Canadian federal election
Party	Candidate	Votes	%
Liberal–Conservative	John Holmes	1,087	51.94
Conservative	John Rochester	1,006	48.06
Total valid votes		2,093	100.0
Source: Canadian Elections Database

Result by municipality

Municipality	Holmes	Rochester	Total vote	Eligible voters
Nepean Township	198	320	518	627
March Township	72	31	103	120
Richmond	14	16	30	79
Fitzroy Township	134	157	291	334
Torbolton Township	19	16	35	45
Huntley Township	259	26	285	331
Marlborough Township	105	130	235	261
North Gower Township	152	113	265	287
Goulbourn Township	134	197	331	373
Total	1,087	1,006	2,093	2,457

== Student Vote result ==
=== 2025 ===
2025 Canadian federal election
Party	Candidate	Votes	%
Conservative	Pierre Poilievre	1,247	37.09
Liberal	Bruce Fanjoy	1,244	37.00
New Democratic	Beth Prokaska	236	7.02
Green	Mark Watson	190	5.65
Marijuana	Danny Légaré	49	1.46
Rhinoceros	Sébastien CoRhino	39	1.16
Independent	Sana Ahmad	21	0.62
Independent	Pierre Gauthier	19	0.57
United	Karen Bourdeau	17	0.51
Canadian Future	Shawn MacEachern	15	0.45
Independent	Sara Burke	13	0.39
No Affiliation	Krzysztof Krzywinski	11	0.33
No Affiliation	Manon Marie Lili Desbiens	10	0.30
Independent	Sophie Bearden	9	0.27
Independent	Maria Gabriel	9	0.27
Independent	David Nguyen	9	0.27
Independent	David Zhu	9	0.27
Independent	Alex Banks	8	0.24
Independent	John Boylan	8	0.24
Independent	John Dale	8	0.24
Independent	Peter Gorman	8	0.24
Independent	Sarah Thompson	8	0.24
Independent	Charlie Currie	7	0.21
Independent	Loren Hicks	7	0.21
No Affiliation	Christopher Navarro-Canseco	7	0.21
Independent	Yogo Shimada	7	0.21
Independent	Scott Falkingham	6	0.18
Independent	Mark Moutter	6	0.18
Independent	John Francis O'Flynn	6	0.18
Independent	Alexandra Engering	5	0.15
Independent	Jeffery Goldman	5	0.15
Independent	Blake Hamilton	5	0.15
Independent	Micheal Skirzynski	5	0.15
Independent	Gregory Gillis	4	0.12
Independent	Artem Gudkov	4	0.12
Independent	Robert Harris	4	0.12
Independent	Ryan Huard	4	0.12
Independent	Kevin Krisa	4	0.12
Independent	Lanna Palsson	4	0.12
Independent	Hakim Sheriff	4	0.12
Independent	Mélodie Anderson	3	0.09
Independent	Michael Bednarski	3	0.09
Independent	Daniel Gagnon	3	0.09
Independent	Trevor Holsworth	3	0.09
No Affiliation	Laina Kohler	3	0.09
Independent	Dan Kyung	3	0.09
No Affiliation	Alexander Lein	3	0.09
Independent	Donald McKay	3	0.09
Independent	Julie St-Amand	3	0.09
Independent	Patrick Strzalkowski	3	0.09
Independent	Elliot Wand	3	0.09
No Affiliation	Jeani Boudreault	2	0.06
Independent	Alain Bourgault	2	0.06
Independent	David Cherniak	2	0.06
No Affiliation	Ysack Dupont	2	0.06
Independent	Euan Fraser Tait	2	0.06
Independent	Daniel Graham	2	0.06
Independent	Anthony Hamel	2	0.06
Independent	Andrea Hollinger	2	0.06
Independent	Seyed Hosseini Lavasani	2	0.06
Independent	Connie Lukawski	2	0.06
Independent	Joseph Maw	2	0.06
Independent	Sheri Oberman	2	0.06
Independent	Guillaume Paradis	2	0.06
Independent	Spencer Rocchi	2	0.06
Independent	Roger Sherwood	2	0.06
No Affiliation	Darcy Vanderwater	2	0.06
Independent	Micheal Wieczorek	2	0.06
Independent	Marthalee Aykoryd	1	0.03
Independent	Line Bélanger	1	0.03
Independent	Dante Camarena Jimenez	1	0.01
Independent	Jenny Cartwright	1	0.03
Independent	Jaël Champagne Gareau	1	0.03
Independent	Zornitsa Halacheva	1	0.03
No Affiliation	Kerri Hildebrandt	1	0.03
Independent	Demetrios Karavas	1	0.03
Independent	Alain Lamontagne	1	0.03
Independent	Charles Lemieux	1	0.03
Independent	Agnieszka Marszalek	1	0.03
Independent	Winston Neutel	1	0.03
Independent	Lajos Polya	1	0.03
Independent	Benjamin Teichman	1	0.03
Independent	Tetia Bayoro	0	0.00
Independent	Gerrit Dogger	0	0.00
Independent	Samuel Lafontaine	0	0.00
Independent	Lény Painchaud	0	0.00
Independent	Lorant Polya	0	0.00
Independent	Wallace Richard Rowat	0	0.00
Independent	Julian Selody	0	0.00
Independent	Pascal St-Amand	0	0.00
Independent	Daniel Stuckless	0	0.00
Total votes		3,362	100
Source: Student Vote Canada

== See also ==
- List of Canadian electoral districts
- Historical federal electoral districts of Canada
- Canadian federal electoral redistribution, 2012

== Notes ==
Parliament of Canada
Preceded by Victoria (BC)	Constituency represented by the prime minister John A. Macdonald; 1882–1887	Succeeded by Kingston
Preceded by Halifax	Constituency represented by the prime minister Robert Borden; 1905–1909	Succeeded by Halifax
