= Andrew Haydon =

Andrew Haydon may refer to:

- Andrew Haydon (senator) (1867–1932), member of the Senate of Canada
- Andrew S. Haydon (1933–2024), municipal politician in Ottawa, and grandson of the senator

== See also ==
- Andrew Hayden-Smith (born 1983), actor
