= Edward Kidd =

Canadian politician (1849–1912)

Member of the Canadian Parliament for Carleton
- In office 1909 – September 16, 1912
- Preceded by: Robert Borden
- Succeeded by: William Foster Garland
- In office 1900–1905
- Preceded by: William Thomas Hodgins
- Succeeded by: Robert Borden

Personal details
- Born: September 9, 1849; Oxford Township, Canada West
- Died: July 16, 1912 (aged 63)
- Political party: Conservative

Edward Kidd (September 9, 1849 – September 16, 1912) was an Ontario farmer and political figure. He represented Carleton in the House of Commons of Canada from 1900 to 1905 and 1909 to 1912 as a Conservative member.

He was born in Oxford Township, Canada West, the son of William Kidd, and was educated in Burritt's Rapids. Kidd served on the council for North Gower Township and for Carleton County. He owned a number of cheese factories in Carleton County. He resigned his seat in 1905 to allow Robert Borden, the party leader, to sit in the house. Kidd died in office in 1912.

His cousin George Nelson Kidd represented Carleton in the Legislative Assembly of Ontario during the same time period and a nephew Thomas Ashmore Kidd later served as speaker for the Ontario legislature.

In North Gower, the road Edward Kidd Crescent is a residential road named after him.

== Electoral record ==
1911 Canadian federal election: Carleton, Ontario
Party	Candidate	Votes	%	±%
Conservative	Edward Kidd	2,616	66.14	–1.14
Liberal	Donald Hector MacLean	1,339	33.86	+1.14
Total valid votes		3,955	100.0	
Conservative hold		Swing		–1.14

Canadian federal by-election, 22 February 1909 On the election of Robert Borden to Halifax and Carleton, and his choosing to sit for Halifax, 25 January 1909
Party	Candidate	Votes
Conservative	Edward Kidd	acclaimed

1904 Canadian federal election: Carleton, Ontario
Party	Candidate	Votes	%	±%
Conservative	Edward Kidd	2,055	63.56	–1.01
Liberal	James E. Caldwell	1,178	36.44	+1.01
Total valid votes		3,233	100.0	
Conservative hold		Swing		–1.01

1900 Canadian federal election: Carleton, Ontario
Party	Candidate	Votes	%	±%
Conservative	Edward Kidd	1,611	64.57	+17.06
Liberal	John McKellar	884	35.43	–4.66
Total valid votes		2,495	100.0	
Conservative hold		Swing		+10.86
