= George Boyce (Canadian politician) =

Canadian politician

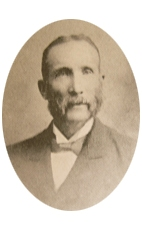

Member of the Canadian Parliament for Carleton
- In office 1917–1921
- Preceded by: William Foster Garland
- Succeeded by: William Foster Garland

Personal details
- Born: 21 December 1848
- Died: February 28, 1930 (aged 81)
- Party: Unionist
- Occupation: Farmer

George Boyce (21 December 1848 – 28 February 1930) was a Canadian politician and farmer. He was elected to the House of Commons of Canada as a Member of the Unionist Party coalition to represent the riding of Carleton. He was also reeve of Nepean Township, Ontario for two years and councillor for Carleton County, Ontario for twelve years.

1917 Canadian federal election: Carleton
Party	Candidate	Votes	%	±%
Government (Unionist)	George Boyce	5,290	66.47	+0.33
Opposition (Laurier Liberals)	Frederick Henry Honeywell	2,669	33.53	–0.33
Total valid votes		7,959	100.0	
Government (Unionist) hold		Swing		+0.33
