= Eugene Forsey =

Canadian scholar and politician (1904–1991)

The Honourable Eugene Forsey PC CC FRSC
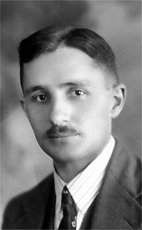
- Forsey while a professor at McGill University

Canadian Senator from Ontario
- In office October 7, 1970 – May 29, 1979
- Nominated by: Pierre Trudeau
- Appointed by: Edward Schreyer

Personal details
- Born: Eugene Alfred Forsey; May 29, 1904 Grand Bank, Newfoundland (present day Newfoundland and Labrador, Canada)
- Died: February 20, 1991 (aged 86)
- Party: Liberal Party of Canada (1970–1982); New Democratic Party (1961–?); Co-operative Commonwealth Federation (c. 1933 – 1961)
- Spouse: Harriet Roberts (m. 1935)

Academic background
- Education: McGill University; Balliol College, Oxford
- Thesis: The Royal Power of Dissolution of Parliament in the British Commonwealth (1941)
- Influences: Edmund Burke; John Macmurray

Academic work
- Discipline: Political science

Eugene Alfred Forsey PC CC FRSC (May 29, 1904 – February 20, 1991) served in the Senate of Canada from 1970 to 1979. He was considered to be one of Canada's foremost constitutional experts.

== Biography ==
Forsey was born on May 29, 1904, in Grand Bank in the Newfoundland Colony. He attended McGill University in Montreal, Quebec.

Forsey was a supporter of the Conservative Party led by Arthur Meighen until he went to Balliol College, Oxford, on a Rhodes Scholarship during which he was converted to democratic socialism. Upon returning to Canada, he joined the League for Social Reconstruction, and was a delegate at the founding convention of the Cooperative Commonwealth Federation (CCF) in 1933 in Regina.

In 1924 Forsey was employed by Vincent Massey as a tutor for the two Massey boys at their Batterwood home near Canton, Ontario. This was an old farmhouse and property that the Masseys had bought in 1918 on rising land backed by rolling hills and facing Lake Ontario a few miles to the south. Forsey was free to enjoy Massey's extensive library, and also socialized with the many visitors. These included academics from the University of Toronto and politicians such as the son of Ramsay MacDonald, the British Prime Minister. Massey at this time was about to enter public life, although his more immediate concern was the health of the family business.

From 1929 to 1941, Forsey served as a lecturer in economics and political science at McGill University. He later taught Canadian government at Carleton University in Ottawa and Canadian government and Canadian labour history at the University of Waterloo. From 1973 to 1977, he served as chancellor of Trent University.

While he had become a social progressive, he remained a "Constitutional conservative", and wrote his PhD thesis on the King–Byng Affair, defending the positions of Arthur Meighen and Governor-General Lord Byng of Vimy. The thesis was published in 1943 as The Royal Power of Dissolution of Parliament. This was one of very few major works on the reserve powers of the Crown in Commonwealth of Nations countries.

Forsey was president of the CCF in Quebec in the 1930s. He spent a number of years working for the CCF, and then as research director for the Canadian Congress of Labour and its successor, the Canadian Labour Congress (CLC). He was a candidate for the party in the Ottawa area riding of Carleton in a 1948 by-election, but lost to the new Progressive Conservative Party of Canada leader George Drew. When asked why he lost he famously quipped that it was because the other candidate received more votes. He ran and lost again in the 1949 election.

In 1958, Forsey, though still a CCF member, was appointed by the Progressive Conservative government of John Diefenbaker to the Board of Broadcast Governors, the predecessor of the Canadian Radio-television and Telecommunications Commission. He remained in that position until he resigned in 1962 because of policy differences.

Shortly after the formation of the New Democratic Party from the alliance of the CLC with the CCF, Forsey resigned from the party because of its constitutional policy which viewed Quebec as a nation within Canada. Later in the 1960s, he was attracted to the views of Pierre Trudeau on the Canadian constitution, and joined the Liberal Party of Canada upon being appointed to the Senate in 1970. He retired from the upper house on reaching the age of 75 in 1979, and turned down an offer from the Liberals to run for a seat in the House of Commons of Canada. He opposed the emergence of Quebec nationalism. Québecor leaders objected that the word "dominion" indicated that Ottawa would have control over Quebec. Under Prime Minister Louis St-Laurent, compromises were reached that quietly, and without legislation, "dominion" was retired in official government names, titles and statements, usually replaced by "federal". Dominion Day remained until in May 1980 when a private member's bill to replace the name with Canada Day was unexpectedly passed in the House. In the Senate, Forsey and the Monarchist League of Canada strongly defended the traditional usage. When a Gallup poll showed 70 percent of all Canadians favoured the change, the Senate approved the bill without a recorded vote. He subsequently resigned from the Liberal Party in 1982 due to disagreements with the proposed changes to the Constitution of Canada.

In 1968, he was made an Officer of the Order of Canada and was promoted to Companion in 1988. He was appointed to the Queen's Privy Council for Canada on June 10, 1985.

In his many commentaries on constitutional issues, especially the reserve powers of the Crown, Forsey was a conspicuous supporter of the action of the Governor-General of Australia, Sir John Kerr, in dismissing the Prime Minister, Gough Whitlam, in the 1975 constitutional crisis because his government was unable to obtain supply (approval to spend money) from the parliament and refused to call a general election.

In retirement Forsey published a study of the labour movement in 1982, Trade Unions in Canada, 1812–1902. His publication How Canadians Govern Themselves is his most enduring legacy, being a comprehensive guide to Canadian government that is continuously edited and published with posthumous credit.

Forsey's daughter, Helen Forsey, was a candidate for the New Democratic Party in the 2006 federal election in the riding of Lanark—Frontenac—Lennox and Addington.

== Honours and awards ==
- Forsey was appointed as an Officer of the Order of Canada on 20 December 1968 giving him the post-nominal letters "OC" for life. This was changed when he was upgraded to Companion of the Order of Canada on 17 November 1988, giving him the post-nominal letters "CC" for life.
- He was sworn in as a Member of the Queen's Privy Council for Canada on 10 June 1985 giving him the honorific prefix "The Honourable" and the post-nominal letters "PC" for life.

Honorary degrees

- Forsey received many honorary degrees for his political career and his work as a constitutional scholar. These include

Province	Date	School	Degree
New Brunswick	May 1962	University of New Brunswick	Doctor of Laws (LL.D)
Newfoundland and Labrador	May 1966	Memorial University of Newfoundland	Doctor of Letters (D.Litt.)
Quebec	30 May 1966	McGill University	Doctor of Laws (LL.D)
Saskatchewan	4 November 1967	University of Saskatchewan	Doctor of Laws (LL.D)
Nova Scotia	1967	Acadia University	
Ontario	1968	University of Toronto	Doctor of Laws (LL.D)
Ontario	1968	University of Waterloo	Doctor of Laws (LL.D)
Nova Scotia	1971	Dalhousie University	Doctor of Laws (LL.D)
Ontario	Fall 1972	York University	Doctor of Laws (LL.D)
New Brunswick	1973	Mount Allison University	Doctor of Civil Law (DCL)
Ontario	1976	Carleton University	Doctor of Laws (LL.D)
Ontario	Fall 1978	Trent University	Doctor of Laws (LL.D)
Ontario	May 1984	McMaster University	Doctor of Laws (LL.D)

== Selected bibliography ==
Works by Forsey

- A Life on the Fringe: The Memoirs of Eugene Forsey. Toronto: Oxford University Press, 1990.
- How Canadians Govern Themselves, 10th ed. (ISBN 978-0-660-34265-8) 2020; How Canadians Govern Themselves, 8th ed. (ISBN 978-1-100-20078-1) Ottawa: Canada, 2012 (1st ed. 1980, 2nd ed. 1988, 3rd ed. 1990).
- Freedom and Order. Toronto: McClelland and Stewart, 1974.
- The Royal Power of Dissolution in the British Commonwealth. Toronto: Oxford University Press, 1938; reprinted 1968; reprinted with a new introduction by Eugene Forsey in 1990 in Evatt and Forsey on the Reserve Powers, (ed. by George Winterton).
- Our Present Discontents (The George C. Nowlan Lectures). Wolfville: Acadia University, 1968.

Works about Forsey

- Forsey, Helen. Eugene Forsey, Canada's Maverick Sage. Toronto: Dundurn, 2012.
- Hodgetts, J.E. The Sound of One Voice: Eugene Forsey and His Letters to the Editor. Toronto: University of Toronto Press, 2000.
- Evatt and Forsey on the Reserve Powers: Legal Books, 1990.
- Chamberlain, Tyler, "The High Tory Conservatism of Eugene Forsey and John Farthing," in Lee Trepanier and Richard Avramenko (eds) Canadian Conservative Political Thought. Routledge, 2023.
- Donald Markwell, "Canada's Best", The Round Table: The Commonwealth Journal of International Affairs, 1990/1991.
- Markwell, Donald (2016). Constitutional Conventions and the Headship of State: Australian Experience. Connor Court. ISBN 9781925501155. Appendix 3: Two Constitutional Scholars: Sir Kenneth Wheare and Dr Eugene Forsey.
- Milligan, Frank (2004). Eugene A. Forsey: An Intellectual Biography. University of Calgary Press. ISBN 978-1-55238-118-2.

== Archives ==
There is a Eugene Forsey fonds at Library and Archives Canada.

== Electoral record ==
1949 Canadian federal election: Carleton
Party	Candidate	Votes	%	±%
Progressive Conservative	George Drew	18,141	52.99	–23.28
Liberal	John H. McDonald	13,937	40.71	
Co-operative Commonwealth	Eugene Forsey	2,155	6.30	–14.63
Total valid votes		34,233	100.0	
Progressive Conservative hold		Swing		–32.00

Canadian federal by-election, 20 December 1948 On the resignation of G. Russell Boucher, 1 November 1948
Party	Candidate	Votes	%	±%
Progressive Conservative	George Drew	12,284	76.27	+14.01
Co-operative Commonwealth	Eugene Forsey	3,371	20.93	+13.46
Social Credit	J. Nelson McCracken	451	2.80	
Total valid votes		16,106	100.0	
Progressive Conservative hold		Swing		+0.28

== See also ==
- List of University of Waterloo people

Academic offices
Preceded by Leslie Frost	Chancellor of Trent University; 1973–1977	Succeeded by William L. Morton
