= Lloyd Francis =

Canadian politician (1920–2007)

The Honourable Lloyd Francis PC

30th Speaker of the House of Commons
- In office January 16, 1984 – November 4, 1984
- Preceded by: Jeanne Sauvé
- Succeeded by: John Bosley

Member of Parliament for Ottawa West
- In office February 18, 1980 – September 4, 1984
- Preceded by: Kenneth Binks
- Succeeded by: David Daubney
- In office July 8, 1974 – May 22, 1979
- Preceded by: Peter Reilly
- Succeeded by: Kenneth Binks
- In office June 25, 1968 – October 30, 1972
- Preceded by: George McIlraith
- Succeeded by: Peter Reilly

Member of Parliament for Carleton
- In office April 8, 1963 – November 8, 1965
- Preceded by: Dick Bell
- Succeeded by: Dick Bell

Personal details
- Born: Cyril Lloyd Francis; March 19, 1920 Ottawa, Ontario, Canada
- Died: January 20, 2007 (aged 86)
- Party: Liberal
- Profession: Businessman

Cyril Lloyd Francis PC (March 19, 1920 – January 20, 2007) was a Canadian politician and speaker of the House of Commons. A member of the Liberal Party, he represented Carleton and Ottawa West in the House of Commons.

== Biography ==
Following service in the Royal Canadian Air Force during World War II, Francis earned a Master of Arts (MA) and doctorate (Ph.D) in economics, and lectured in the discipline from 1948 to 1951 at the University at Buffalo. He then joined the Department of National Health and Welfare in Ottawa as a senior economist.

In 1956, Lloyd Francis and partner, lawyer Donald Sim, carrying on business as Lynhar Developments, acquired and laid out the Stinson Avenue area of Bells Corners in Nepean. They quickly formed a partnership with William Teron, T.F.S. Lands, to build the houses in Lynwood Village.

The Lynwood Plaza at Bells Corners was built by Francis and Sim's Lynhar Developments and included what would become the landmark Robinson IGA.

Long time Nepean Reeve D. Aubrey Moodie, in his book, "The Spirit of Nepean" described Francis as one of the contributors to the foundation of Nepean. Moodie explains about the introduction of lot levies, now known as development charges, and how they contributed to the financial stability of Nepean Township. It was the transfer of large sums of money in the form of lot levies, along with Francis and Teron's aggressive development activity that enabled much of Nepean's Parkwood Hills and Bells Corners neighbourhoods to be built. To the pleasure of some and the disdain of others, Mr. Francis was one of a list of individuals credited with the introduction of lot levies as a development finance tool that is relied upon to this day to fund infrastructure commensurate with new residential developments.

In 1958, Francis became President of the Professional Institute of the Public Service of Canada, a union representing civil servants in certain professions. In 1959, he entered municipal politics by being elected alderman on Ottawa City Council. From 1960 to 1963, he served on the city's Board of Control and as Deputy Mayor.

He entered federal politics as a Liberal candidate in the 1962 election but was defeated in the Ottawa-area riding of Carleton. His electoral record was mixed throughout his career and he would only win election on alternate attempts. Accordingly, he served as Member of Parliament (MP) for Carleton from 1963 to 1965 and then for Ottawa West in 1968–1972, 1974–1979 and 1980–1984. In his autobiography, Ottawa Boy, Francis described his anger when, in 1974, Liberal Party insiders tried to "parachute" in an alternate candidate, Byron Hyde, a politically inexperienced outsider, to run against him, to be the Liberal Party candidate for his riding.

He served as Chief Government Whip from 1970 to 1971 and then as Parliamentary Secretary to the Minister of Veterans Affairs until he was defeated in the 1972 election. After he returned to Parliament in the 1974 election, he served as Parliamentary Secretary to the President of the Treasury Board from 1975 to 1976.

In 1980, he became Deputy Speaker of the House of Commons. He succeeded Jeanne Sauvé as Speaker on January 15, 1984, when Sauvé became Governor General of Canada.

The Liberal government was defeated in the 1984 election, and Francis lost his seat. His term as Speaker ended when the new House of Commons convened in November of that year.

On the conclusion of his term as Speaker, Francis was appointed to the Queen's Privy Council for Canada. In late 1984, the new Prime Minister of Canada, Brian Mulroney, appointed Francis to the position of Ambassador to Portugal. Francis returned to Ottawa at the conclusion of his appointment in 1987.

He died in January 2007, after suffering from stomach cancer.

== The Francis Tapes ==
In 1985, prior to him leaving to Portugal as Canada's Ambassador, Francis gave a revealing interview in recorded tapes made for the Public Archives of Canada and the Library of Parliament as part of historical archives that he claimed to have thought would be released only 15 or 25 years later. The tapes revealed alleged sexual harassment and fraud in the House of Commons.

== Electoral record ==
1963 Canadian federal election: Carleton
Party	Candidate	Votes	%	±%
Liberal	Lloyd Francis	32,325	48.01	+6.02
Progressive Conservative	Dick Bell	31,168	46.29	–5.40
New Democratic	Lewis Hanley	3,144	4.67	–0.19
Social Credit	Harold Herbert Splett	699	1.04	–0.44
Total valid votes		67,336	100.0	
Liberal gain from Progressive Conservative		Swing		+5.71

1965 Canadian federal election: Carleton
Party	Candidate	Votes	%	±%
Progressive Conservative	Dick Bell	32,456	43.90	–2.39
Liberal	Lloyd Francis	31,523	42.64	–5.37
New Democratic	Donald V. Stirling	9,953	13.46	+8.79
Total valid votes		73,932	100.0	
Progressive Conservative gain from Liberal		Swing		+1.49

1968 Canadian federal election
Party	Candidate	Votes	%
Liberal	Lloyd Francis	23,750	52.61
Progressive Conservative	Richard A. Bell	16,392	36.31
New Democratic	Ralph Sutherland	5,003	11.08

1972 Canadian federal election
Party	Candidate	Votes
Progressive Conservative	Peter Reilly	22,169
Liberal	Lloyd Francis	18,423
New Democratic	Pauline Jewett	13,498
Social Credit	Priscilla Hamelin	245

1974 Canadian federal election
Party	Candidate	Votes
Liberal	Lloyd Francis	23,604
Progressive Conservative	Peter Reilly	21,838
New Democratic	Doris Shackleton	6,480
No affiliation	Lawrence F. Sullivan	432
Social Credit	Jacques Lapointe	192
Communist	Jean Greatbatch	78
Marxist–Leninist	Richard Bowen	67

1979 Canadian federal election
Party	Candidate	Votes
Progressive Conservative	Kenneth Binks	24,981
Liberal	Lloyd Francis	22,985
New Democratic	Abby Pollonetsky	7,051
Independent	John Turmel	193

1980 Canadian federal election
Party	Candidate	Votes
Liberal	Lloyd Francis	22,460
Progressive Conservative	Kenneth Binks	21,940
New Democratic	Abby Pollonetsky	5,955
Independent	John A. Clark	398

1984 Canadian federal election
Party	Candidate	Votes
Progressive Conservative	David Daubney	26,591
Liberal	Lloyd Francis	19,314
New Democratic	Ross Chapman	8,304
Independent	Thérèse Turmel	285

Political offices
Preceded by Bernard Pilon	Chief Government Whip; 1970–1971	Succeeded by Grant Deachman
Preceded by Gérald Laniel	Deputy Speaker and Chairman of Committees of the Whole of the House of Commons; April 14, 1980 – January 15, 1984	Succeeded by Eymard Corbin
Diplomatic posts
Preceded by Lucien Lamoureux	Canadian Ambassador to Portugal; 1984–1987	Succeeded by Geoffrey Franklin Bruce
