= William Thomas Hodgins =

Canadian politician

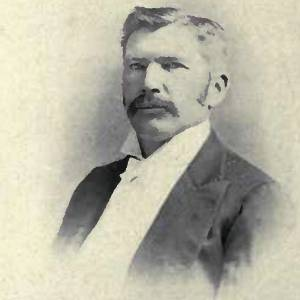

Member of the Canadian Parliament for Carleton
- In office 1891–1900
- Preceded by: George Lemuel Dickinson
- Succeeded by: Edward Kidd

Personal details
- Born: February 27, 1857; Goulbourn Township, Canada West
- Died: c. 1909-1910 (Aged 52); Goulbourn Township, Ontario, Canada
- Political party: Conservative Party of Canada
- Profession: Politician

William Thomas Hodgins (February 27, 1857 – December 3, 1909) was a farmer and political figure in Ontario, Canada. He represented Carleton in the House of Commons of Canada from 1891 to 1900 as a Conservative member.

He was born in Goulbourn Township, Canada West, the son of John Hodgins and Sarah Jane Kidd. His grandfather William Hodgins, an Irish immigrant, was one of the first settlers in Carleton County. Hodgins served as a member of the municipal council for Goulbourn township in 1888. He died in Goulbourn township at the age of 52.

1896 Canadian federal election: Carleton, Ontario
Party	Candidate	Votes	%	±%
Conservative	William Thomas Hodgins	1,337	47.51	–3.22
Liberal	John McKellar	1,128	40.09	
Independent	J.S. Hendricks	299	10.63	
McCarthyite	Thomas Butler	50	1.78	
Total valid votes		2,814	100.0	
Conservative hold		Swing		

1891 Canadian federal election: Carleton, Ontario
Party	Candidate	Votes	%	±%
Conservative	William Thomas Hodgins	1,494	50.73	
Conservative	George Lemuel Dickinson	1,451	49.27	–12.30
Total valid votes		2,945	100.0	
Conservative hold		Swing		
