= Dick Bell =

Canadian politician

The Honourable Dick Bell PC QC
- Official 1966 portrait

Minister of Citizenship and Immigration
- In office August 9, 1962 – April 22, 1963
- Prime Minister: John Diefenbaker
- Preceded by: Ellen Fairclough
- Succeeded by: Guy Favreau

Member of Parliament for Carleton
- In office November 8, 1965 – June 25, 1968
- Preceded by: Lloyd Francis
- Succeeded by: Riding abolished
- In office June 10, 1957 – April 8, 1963
- Preceded by: George A. Drew
- Succeeded by: Lloyd Francis

Personal details
- Born: Richard Albert Bell; September 4, 1913 Nepean, Ontario, Canada
- Died: March 20, 1988 (aged 74) Ottawa, Ontario, Canada
- Party: Progressive Conservative
- Profession: Politician

Richard Albert Bell PC QC (September 4, 1913 – March 20, 1988) was a member of the House of Commons of Canada representing Carleton from 1957 to 1963 and from 1965 to 1968.

He was born at Britannia Heights in Nepean Township, Ontario in 1913. He served as solicitor for Nepean Township and the City of Nepean.

Elected as a Progressive Conservative Member of Parliament in the government of John Diefenbaker, Bell was Minister of Citizenship and Immigration from 1962 to 1963.

Dick Bell Park on the Ottawa River, home of the Nepean Sailing Club, was named in his honour.

He died in Ottawa in 1988. He is buried in Pinecrest Cemetery in Ottawa.

The family home, "Fairfields", 3080 Richmond Rd. where he was born and died was donated to the city of Ottawa in 2000. Fairfields Heritage Property was built in the 1840s. The residence was rebuilt in the Gothic Revival style after a fire in 1870. The heritage home, which sits on 1.84 acres of the prominent Bell family's once extensive farm, was included amongst other architecturally interesting and historically significant buildings in Doors Open Ottawa, held June 2 and 3, 2012.

He was one of the founding partners of the law firm Bell Baker LLP located in Ottawa, Ontario.

== Electoral history ==
1965 Canadian federal election: Carleton
| Party | Candidate | Votes | % | ±% |
|---|---|---|---|---|
| Progressive Conservative | Dick Bell | 32,456 | 43.90 | –2.39 |
| Liberal | Lloyd Francis | 31,523 | 42.64 | –5.37 |
| New Democratic | Donald V. Stirling | 9,953 | 13.46 | +8.79 |
| Total valid votes | | 73,932 | 100.0 | |
| Progressive Conservative gain from Liberal | | Swing | | +1.49 |

1963 Canadian federal election: Carleton
| Party | Candidate | Votes | % | ±% |
|---|---|---|---|---|
| Liberal | Lloyd Francis | 32,325 | 48.01 | +6.02 |
| Progressive Conservative | Dick Bell | 31,168 | 46.29 | –5.40 |
| New Democratic | Lewis Hanley | 3,144 | 4.67 | –0.19 |
| Social Credit | Harold Herbert Splett | 699 | 1.04 | –0.44 |
| Total valid votes | | 67,336 | 100.0 | |
| Liberal gain from Progressive Conservative | | Swing | | +5.71 |

1962 Canadian federal election: Carleton
| Party | Candidate | Votes | % | ±% |
|---|---|---|---|---|
| Progressive Conservative | Dick Bell | 32,125 | 51.66 | –15.81 |
| Liberal | Lloyd Francis | 26,109 | 41.99 | +13.86 |
| New Democratic | Lewis Hanley | 3,024 | 4.86 | +1.20 |
| Social Credit | Harold Herbert Splett | 922 | 1.48 | +0.75 |
| Total valid votes | | 62,180 | 100.0 | |
| Progressive Conservative hold | | Swing | | –14.84 |

1958 Canadian federal election: Carleton
| Party | Candidate | Votes | % | ±% |
|---|---|---|---|---|
| Progressive Conservative | Dick Bell | 32,741 | 67.47 | +5.69 |
| Liberal | George Humble | 13,652 | 28.13 | –5.79 |
| Co-operative Commonwealth | Stewart I. Crawford | 1,777 | 3.66 | +0.70 |
| Social Credit | Grace Gough | 355 | 0.73 | –0.62 |
| Total valid votes | | 48,525 | 100.0 | |
| Progressive Conservative hold | | Swing | | +5.74 |

1957 Canadian federal election: Carleton
| Party | Candidate | Votes | % | ±% |
|---|---|---|---|---|
| Progressive Conservative | Dick Bell | 27,865 | 61.78 | +6.53 |
| Liberal | Frank Egan Dunlap | 15,298 | 33.92 | –6.34 |
| Co-operative Commonwealth | Stewart I. Crawford | 1,334 | 2.96 | +0.01 |
| Social Credit | Eric Kingsley Fallis | 607 | 1.35 | –0.19 |
| Total valid votes | | 45,104 | 100.0 | |
| Progressive Conservative hold | | Swing | | +6.44 |

== Archives ==
There is a Richard Albert Bell fonds at Library and Archives Canada. It contains 32.794 m of textual records and 330 photographs.
