= Ottawa West =

Former electoral district in Ontario, Canada

Ontario electoral district

Defunct federal electoral district
- Legislature: House of Commons
- District created: 1934
- District abolished: 1996
- First contested: 1935
- Last contested: 1993

Ottawa West was a federal electoral district in Ontario, Canada, that was represented in the House of Commons of Canada from 1935 to 1997. It covered the western part of the Ottawa area.

== Federal electoral district ==
The federal district of Ottawa West was created from the riding of Ottawa and part of the riding of Carleton in 1934. The federal riding of Ottawa West initially consisted of, in the city of Ottawa, the Central, Capital, Wellington, Dalhousie, the parts of Victoria and Elmdale wards east of Parkdale Avenue, and the part of Riverdale ward not included in Ottawa East.

In 1947, it was redefined to consist of, in the city of Ottawa, Central and Wellington wards, the part of Dalhousie Ward north of Carling Avenue, the part of Capital Ward north of Carling Avenue and Linden Terrace, and the parts of Victoria and Elmdale Wards east of Parkdale Avenue.

In 1952, it was redefined to consist of the part of the city of Ottawa west of a line running along Parkdale Avenue south to Avenue, east to O'Connor Street, north to Linden Terrace, and east to the Rideau Canal.

In 1966, it was redefined to consist of the part of the city of Ottawa west of a line running along the Canadian Pacific Railway line from the interprovincial boundary to Bayview Road, southeast to Bayswater Avenue, south to Carling Avenue, west to Fisher Avenue, south to Baseline Road, west to the western limit of the City of Ottawa.

In 1976, it was redefined to consist of the part of the city of Ottawa west of a line running along the Canadian Pacific Railway line from the interprovincial boundary, south to Somerset Street, west along Somerset Street and Wellington Street to Holland Avenue, south to Carling Avenue, west to Fisher Avenue, and south to the city limit.

In 1987, it was redefined to consist of the part of the city of Ottawa west of a line running from the eastern extremity of the southern limit of the City of Ottawa (immediately south of Baseline Road), east to Fisher Avenue, north to Carling Avenue, east to Island Park Drive, and north to the interprovincial boundary.

The federal electoral district was abolished in 1996 when it was redistributed between Ottawa Centre and Ottawa West—Nepean ridings.

== Members of Parliament ==
This riding elected the following members of the House of Commons of Canada:

Parliament	Years	Member	Party
Riding created from City of Ottawa and Carleton
18th	1935–1940	T. Franklin Ahearn	Liberal
19th	1940–1945	George McIlraith	Liberal
20th	1945–1949	George McIlraith	Liberal
21st	1949–1953	George McIlraith	Liberal
22nd	1953–1957	George McIlraith	Liberal
23rd	1957–1958	George McIlraith	Liberal
24th	1958–1962	George McIlraith	Liberal
25th	1962–1963	George McIlraith	Liberal
26th	1963–1965	George McIlraith	Liberal
27th	1965–1968	George McIlraith	Liberal
28th	1968–1972	Lloyd Francis	Liberal
29th	1972–1974	Peter Reilly	Progressive Conservative
30th	1974–1979	Lloyd Francis	Liberal
31st	1979–1980	Kenneth Binks	Progressive Conservative
32nd	1980–1984	Lloyd Francis	Liberal
33rd	1984–1988	David Daubney	Progressive Conservative
34th	1988–1993	Marlene Catterall	Liberal
35th	1993–1997	Marlene Catterall	Liberal
Riding dissolved into Ottawa West—Nepean and Ottawa Centre

== Election results ==
1935 Canadian federal election
Party	Candidate	Votes
Liberal	T. Franklin Ahearn	21,503
Conservative	Hamnett Pinhey Hill	15,219
Reconstruction	Franklin Deans Burkholder	7,274
Independent Liberal	William Joseph Press	210

1940 Canadian federal election
Party	Candidate	Votes
Liberal	George McIlraith	27,460
National Government	Theodore Howell Leggett	19,780

1945 Canadian federal election
Party	Candidate	Votes
Liberal	George McIlraith	24,458
Progressive Conservative	Norman B. MacRostie	21,993
Co-operative Commonwealth	Walter B. Mann	4,824
Labor–Progressive	Harry Binder	602
Social Credit	Kenneth L. McCuaig	495
Independent	Sydney Tom Checkland	177

1949 Canadian federal election
Party	Candidate	Votes
Liberal	George McIlraith	24,295
Progressive Conservative	Osmond Francis Howe	15,010
Co-operative Commonwealth	Walter Beresford Mann	2,754

1953 Canadian federal election
Party	Candidate	Votes
Liberal	George McIlraith	20,933
Progressive Conservative	O. F. Howe	13,539
Co-operative Commonwealth	John E. MacNab	1,209
Labor–Progressive	Daniel Nerenberg	219

1957 Canadian federal election
Party	Candidate	Votes
Liberal	George McIlraith	19,434
Progressive Conservative	Ethel T. Shaw	12,538
Co-operative Commonwealth	David Williams	1,062
Social Credit	Laurence M. Maloney	881

1958 Canadian federal election
Party	Candidate	Votes
Liberal	George McIlraith	19,098
Progressive Conservative	Charlotte Whitton	17,673
Co-operative Commonwealth	James A. M. Allen	751

1962 Canadian federal election
Party	Candidate	Votes
Liberal	George McIlraith	16,935
Progressive Conservative	Pat Kelly	11,397
New Democratic	Walter Mann	1,538
Social Credit	F. D. Richardson	698

1963 Canadian federal election
Party	Candidate	Votes
Liberal	George McIlraith	18,634
Progressive Conservative	Don Hueston	9,852
New Democratic	Brian E. Huggins	1,422
Social Credit	F. D. Richardson	924

1965 Canadian federal election
Party	Candidate	Votes
Liberal	George McIlraith	14,945
Progressive Conservative	Courtenay Evans	8,604
New Democratic	David John Weston	2,057
Social Credit	Angelo Tomasini	504

1968 Canadian federal election
Party	Candidate	Votes	%
Liberal	Lloyd Francis	23,750	52.61
Progressive Conservative	Richard A. Bell	16,392	36.31
New Democratic	Ralph Sutherland	5,003	11.08

1972 Canadian federal election
Party	Candidate	Votes
Progressive Conservative	Peter Reilly	22,169
Liberal	Lloyd Francis	18,423
New Democratic	Pauline Jewett	13,498
Social Credit	Priscilla Hamelin	245

1974 Canadian federal election
Party	Candidate	Votes
Liberal	Lloyd Francis	23,604
Progressive Conservative	Peter Reilly	21,838
New Democratic	Doris Shackleton	6,480
No affiliation	Lawrence F. Sullivan	432
Social Credit	Jacques Lapointe	192
Communist	Jean Greatbatch	78
Marxist–Leninist	Richard Bowen	67

1979 Canadian federal election
Party	Candidate	Votes
Progressive Conservative	Kenneth Binks	24,981
Liberal	Lloyd Francis	22,985
New Democratic	Abby Pollonetsky	7,051
Independent	John Turmel	193

1980 Canadian federal election
Party	Candidate	Votes
Liberal	Lloyd Francis	22,460
Progressive Conservative	Kenneth Binks	21,940
New Democratic	Abby Pollonetsky	5,955
Independent	John A. Clark	398

1984 Canadian federal election
Party	Candidate	Votes
Progressive Conservative	David Daubney	26,591
Liberal	Lloyd Francis	19,314
New Democratic	Ross Chapman	8,304
Independent	Thérèse Turmel	285

1988 Canadian federal election
Party	Candidate	Votes
Liberal	Marlene Catterall	23,470
Progressive Conservative	David Daubney	18,299
New Democratic	Theresa Kavanagh	5,300
Communist	Peter Cavers	156
No affiliation	Donna Petersen	130

1993 Canadian federal election
Party	Candidate	Votes
Liberal	Marlene Catterall	28,012
Reform	Peter Boddy	6,144
Progressive Conservative	Nancy Munro-Parry	6,135
New Democratic	Norman Bobbitt	1,854
National	Bryce Wilson	832
Green	Morgan Van Wyck	225
Natural Law	Stan Lamothe	156
Libertarian	Leonard Knoll	122
Abolitionist	Julie Start	27
Commonwealth of Canada	Kamal Shah	22

== See also ==
- List of Ontario provincial electoral districts
- Historical federal electoral districts of Canada
