= Alonzo Hyndman =

Canadian politician (1890–1940)

Member of Parliament for Carleton
- In office October 1935 – January 1940
- Preceded by: William Foster Garland
- Succeeded by: George Russell Boucher

Personal details
- Born: Alonzo Bowen Hyndman; 28 July 1890 South Mountain, Ontario, Canada
- Died: 9 April 1940 (aged 49)
- Party: Conservative; National Government
- Spouse(s): Johnson m. 29 August 1916
- Profession: physician

Alonzo Bowen Hyndman (28 July 1890 – 9 April 1940) was a Canadian physician and politician. Hyndman was a Conservative and National Government member of the House of Commons of Canada. He was born in South Mountain, Ontario and became a physician by career.

He attended high school in Kemptville, Ontario, then Smiths Falls Collegiate. He studied at McGill University in Montreal where he attained his medical degree (MDCM) in 1915, then established a medical practice at Carp.

Hyndman was first elected to Parliament at Ontario's Carleton riding in the 1935 general election and re-elected there under the National Government party banner in 1940. Hyndman died suddenly on 9 April 1940, two weeks after the general election, before he was due to be sworn in for the 19th Canadian Parliament.

== Electoral record ==
1940 Canadian federal election: Carleton
Party	Candidate	Votes	%	±%
National Government	Alonzo Hyndman	7,736	53.90	+11.54
Liberal	Herbert Samuel Arkell	6,617	46.10	+9.61
Total valid votes		14,353	100.0	
National Government hold		Swing		+0.96

1935 Canadian federal election: Carleton
Party	Candidate	Votes	%	±%
Conservative	Alonzo Hyndman	6,872	42.36	–1.42
Liberal	Herbert Samuel Arkell	5,919	36.49	–5.56
Reconstruction	Herman Ralph James	3,431	21.15	
Total valid votes		16,222	100.0	
Conservative hold		Swing		+2.07
