= George McIlraith =

Canadian politician

The Honourable George McIlraith PC QC
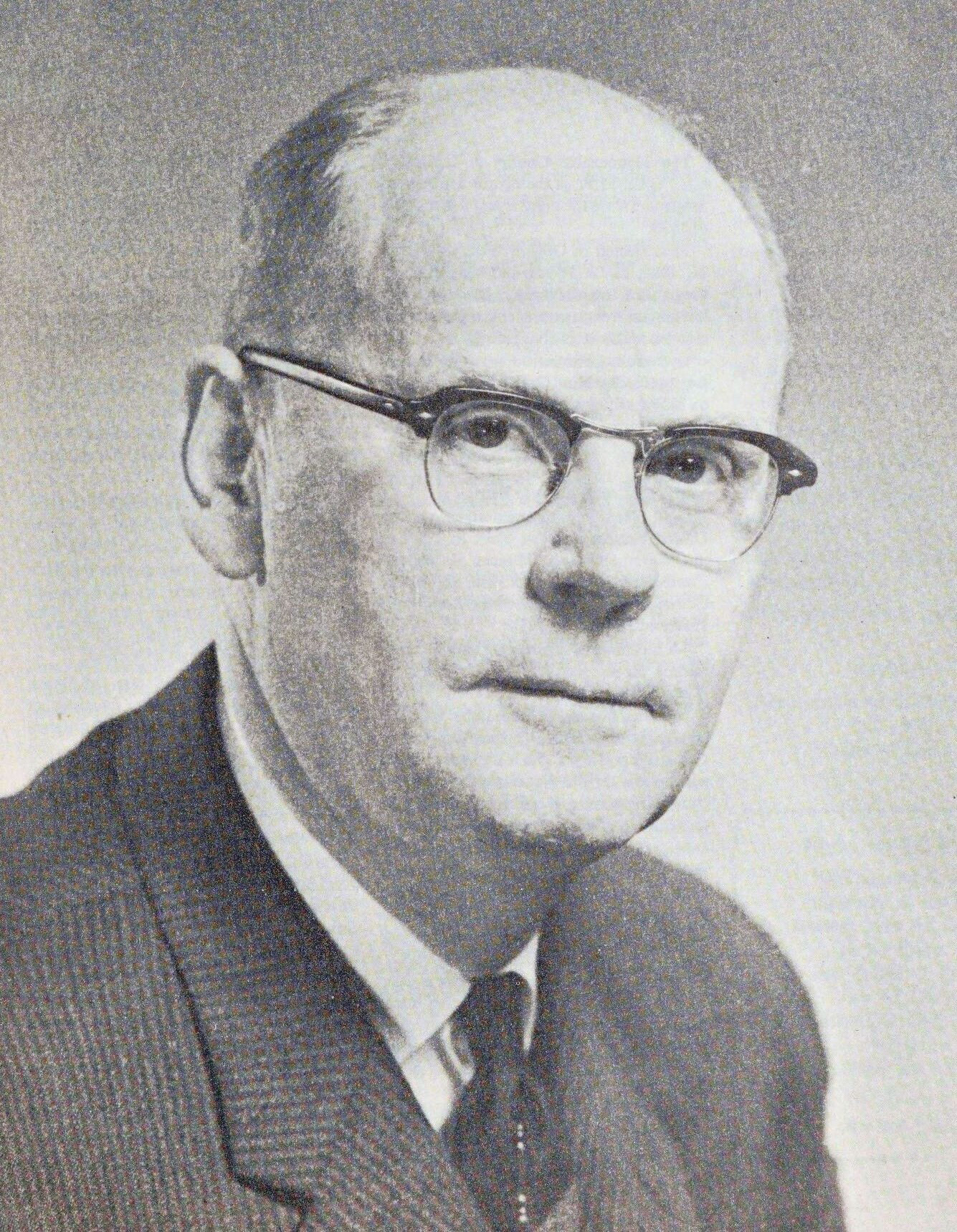

Solicitor General of Canada
- In office 6 July 1968 – 21 December 1970
- Prime Minister: Pierre Trudeau
- Preceded by: John Turner
- Succeeded by: Jean-Pierre Goyer

Minister of Public Works
- In office 7 July 1965 – 5 July 1968
- Prime Minister: Lester B. Pearson; Pierre Trudeau
- Preceded by: Lucien Cardin
- Succeeded by: Arthur Laing

Minister of Justice Attorney General of Canada
- Acting; 30 June 1965 – 6 July 1965
- Prime Minister: Lester B. Pearson
- Preceded by: Guy Favreau
- Succeeded by: Lucien Cardin

President of the Privy Council
- In office 3 February 1964 – 6 July 1965
- Prime Minister: Lester B. Pearson
- Preceded by: Maurice Lamontagne
- Succeeded by: Guy Favreau

Minister of National Revenue
- Acting; 19 March 1964 – 28 June 1964
- Prime Minister: Lester B. Pearson
- Preceded by: Jack Garland
- Succeeded by: Edgar Benson

Minister of Transport
- In office 22 April 1963 – 2 February 1964
- Prime Minister: Lester B. Pearson
- Preceded by: Léon Balcer
- Succeeded by: Jack Pickersgill

Canadian Senator from Ontario
- In office 27 April 1972 – 29 July 1981
- Appointed by: Pierre Trudeau

Member of Parliament for Ottawa Centre
- In office 25 June 1968 – 26 April 1972
- Preceded by: Riding created
- Succeeded by: Hugh Poulin

Member of Parliament for Ottawa West
- In office 26 March 1940 – 24 June 1968
- Preceded by: T. Franklin Ahearn
- Succeeded by: Cyril Lloyd Francis

Personal details
- Born: George James McIlraith; 29 July 1908 Lanark, Ontario, Canada
- Died: 19 August 1992 (aged 84)
- Party: Liberal
- Relations: Margaret Akin Summers (m. 1935; died 1989)
- Children: 4
- Profession: Barrister; Lawyer

George James McIlraith PC QC (29 July 1908 – 19 August 1992) was a lawyer and Canadian Parliamentarian.

== Background ==
The son of James McIlraith and Kate McLeod, he was educated at Osgoode Hall and practised law in Ottawa. In 1935, he married Margaret Summers.

McIlraith was first elected to the House of Commons of Canada in the 1940 federal election as the Liberal Member of Parliament for Ottawa West. He was subsequently re-elected on nine successive occasions.

McIlraith joined the Cabinet of Lester Pearson as Minister of Transport when the Liberals formed government following the 1963 federal election. From 1964 until 1967, he was Government House Leader in charge of the Pearson minority government's parliamentary strategy for much of its tenure, including during the Great Flag Debate and parliamentary debates on the introduction of Medicare.

He also served as Pearson's Minister of Public Works from 1965 on, and was also Pierre Trudeau's first public works minister. He served as Solicitor-General of Canada from 1968 until 1970 under Trudeau, who appointed him to the Senate of Canada in 1972.

The George McIlraith Bridge over the Rideau River is named for him.

Political offices
Preceded by Guy Favreau	Leader of the Government in the House of Commons; 1964–1967	Succeeded by Allan MacEachen
