= George A. Drew =

Canadian politician and Premier of Ontario

The Honourable George A. Drew PC CC QC
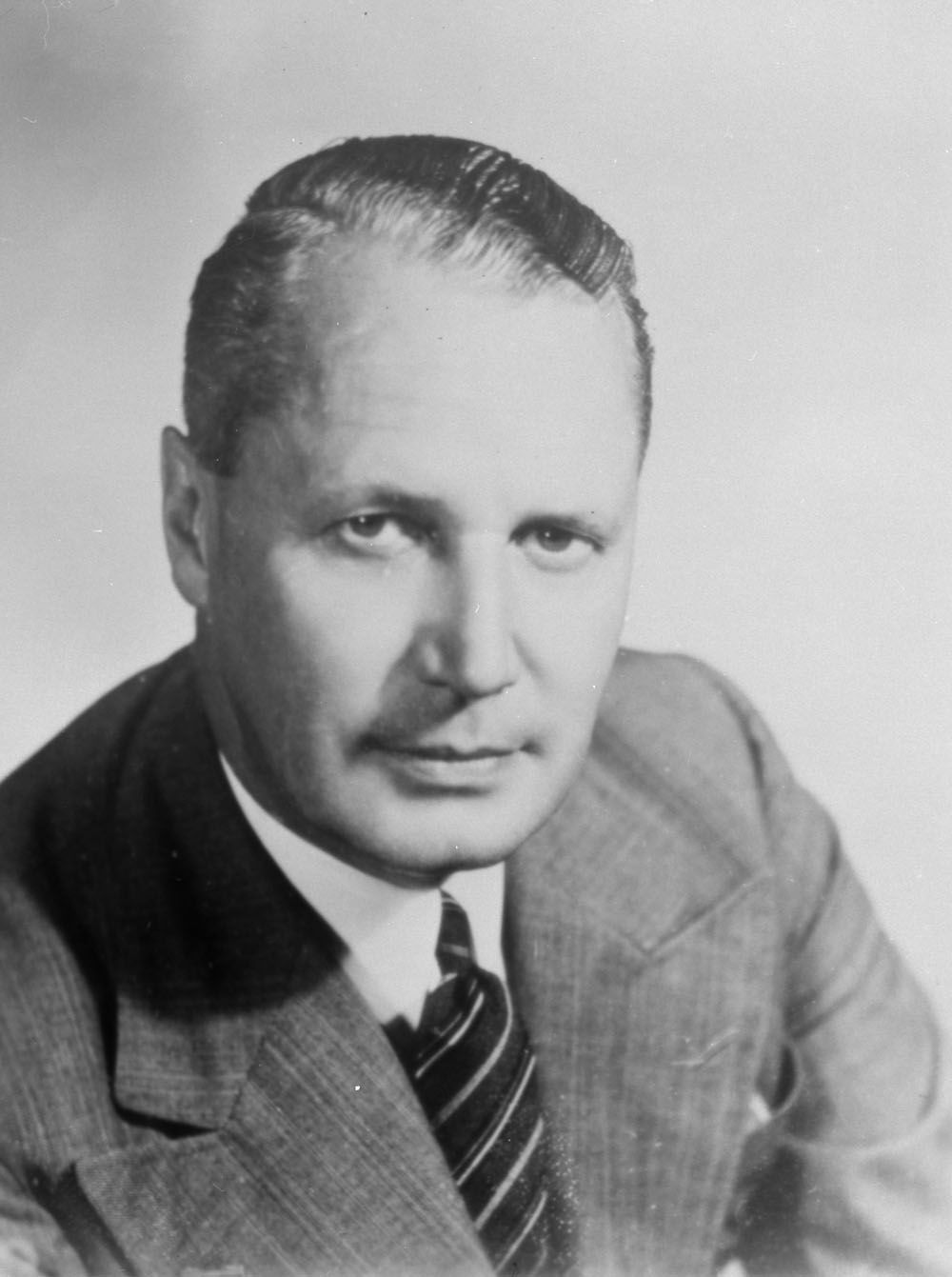

Canadian High Commissioner to the United Kingdom
- In office June 24, 1957 – March 30, 1963
- Prime Minister: John Diefenbaker; Lester B. Pearson
- Preceded by: Norman Robertson
- Succeeded by: Lionel Chevrier

Leader of the Opposition
- In office February 1, 1955 – August 1, 1956
- Preceded by: William Earl Rowe
- Succeeded by: William Earl Rowe
- In office December 20, 1948 – November 1, 1954
- Preceded by: John Bracken
- Succeeded by: William Earl Rowe

Leader of the Progressive Conservative Party of Canada
- In office October 2, 1948 – September 21, 1956
- Preceded by: John Bracken
- Succeeded by: William Earl Rowe (interim)

Member of Parliament for Carleton
- In office December 20, 1948 – January 8, 1957
- Preceded by: George Russell Boucher
- Succeeded by: Dick Bell

14th Premier of Ontario
- In office August 17, 1943 – October 19, 1948
- Monarch: George VI
- Lieutenant Governor: Albert E. Matthews; Ray Lawson
- Preceded by: Harry Nixon
- Succeeded by: Thomas Kennedy

Member of Provincial Parliament for High Park
- In office August 4, 1943 – June 6, 1948
- Preceded by: William Alexander Baird
- Succeeded by: William Horace Temple

Member of Provincial Parliament for Simcoe East
- In office February 14, 1939 – August 3, 1943
- Preceded by: William Finlayson
- Succeeded by: John Duncan McPhee

Personal details
- Born: George Alexander Drew; May 7, 1894 Guelph, Ontario, Canada
- Died: January 4, 1973 (aged 78) Toronto, Ontario, Canada
- Resting place: Woodlawn Memorial Park, Guelph, Ontario, Canada
- Party: Progressive Conservative (federal); Ontario PC Party (provincial)
- Spouses: Fiorenza d'Arneiro Johnson (m. 1936; died 1965) Florence McCullagh (m. 1966)
- Children: 2
- Education: University of Toronto (BA); Osgoode Hall Law School
- Profession: Barrister; Ambassador; Author

Military service
- Allegiance: Canada
- Branch/service: Canadian Expeditionary Force
- Years of service: 1914–1919
- Rank: Lieutenant-colonel
- Battles/wars: World War I

George Alexander Drew PC CC QC (May 7, 1894 – January 4, 1973) was a Canadian politician. He served as the 14th premier of Ontario from 1943 to 1948 and founded a Progressive Conservative dynasty that would last 42 years. He later served as leader of the federal Progressive Conservative Party and Leader of the Official Opposition from 1948 to 1956.

== Early life ==
Drew was born in Guelph, Ontario, the son of Annie Isabelle Stevenson (Gibbs) and John Jacob Drew. He was educated at Upper Canada College and graduated from the University of Toronto, where he was a member of the Delta Kappa Epsilon fraternity (Alpha Phi chapter). He then studied law at Osgoode Hall Law School. He served with distinction in World War I as an officer in the Canadian Field Artillery. After the war, he became lieutenant-colonel of the 11th Field Brigade and later honorary colonel of the 11th Field Regiment, Royal Canadian Artillery. He was the author of a book about Canadian aviators in World War I, "Canada's Fighting Airmen."

He was called to the bar in 1920. He married Fiorenza Johnson (1910–1965), daughter of Edward Johnson, who was a noted opera singer (tenor) and later general manager (1935–1950) of the Metropolitan Opera House, in New York City. Drew remarried in 1966 to Phyllis McCullagh, the widow of George McCullagh, the former publisher of Toronto's The Globe and Mail and The Toronto Telegram newspapers.

== Entry to politics ==
Drew was elected mayor of the City of Guelph in 1925 after he had served as an alderman. In 1929, he left to become assistant master and then master of the Supreme Court of Ontario. As a practising lawyer, he was in 1931 appointed as the first chairman of the Ontario Securities Commission by the provincial Conservative government and was fired by the Liberal government of the colourful Mitch Hepburn, who had come power as a result of the 1934 provincial election. Drew ran for the leadership of the nearly-moribund Conservative Party of Ontario at the 1936 Conservative leadership convention. He lost to William Earl Rowe, who appointed Drew to the position of provincial organizer for the party.

Drew broke with the Conservatives, however, when they opposed Hepburn's attempt to crush the Congress of Industrial Organizations attempt to unionize General Motors in Oshawa. Drew ran as an Independent Conservative in Wellington South during the 1937 provincial election but was defeated, along with the Conservatives. Rowe failed to win a seat in the legislature and consequently resigned as party leader. Drew ran again for the Conservative leadership in 1938, this time successfully, and entered the Legislative Assembly of Ontario at a 1939 by-election as the Member of Provincial Parliament for Simcoe East. In the 1943 provincial election, he was elected in the Toronto riding of High Park.

The Liberal government went through a series of crises during World War II because of Hepburn's feud with Canadian prime minister William Lyon Mackenzie King and his Liberal Party of Canada. The crises led to Hepburn's resignation.

== Premier of Ontario ==
In the 1943 provincial election, the Tories, now called the "Progressive Conservatives", won a minority government, narrowly beating the social democratic Co-operative Commonwealth Federation (CCF) led by Ted Jolliffe. (Jolliffe and Drew had attended the same high school in Guelph, Ontario, the Guelph Collegiate Vocational Institute).

=== First term ===
Drew won by responding to the mood of the times and running on a relatively left-wing platform, promising such radical reforms as free dental care and Medicare. His government did not implement much of its promised platform (including Medicare or free dental care), but it established the basis for the Tory regimes that followed by trying to steer a moderate course.

==== Education ====
His government introduced the Drew Regulation in 1944, which made it compulsory for Ontario schools to provide one hour of religious instruction a week. By religious instruction, Drew meant the "instruction in the tenets of the Christian faith", a measure that was considered to be anti-Semitic by Ontario's Jewish community. Rabbi Abraham Feinberg led the opposition to the Drew regulation and said that it was "undemocratic, imperiling the separation of Church and State, and leading to disunity in society."

==== Relationship with federal government ====
Drew was strident in his criticism of the federal government of Mackenzie King, attacked its leadership in the Canadian war effort, chastised it during the Conscription Crisis of 1944 for not instituting full conscription, and accused it of attempting to centralize power.

==== 1945 election ====
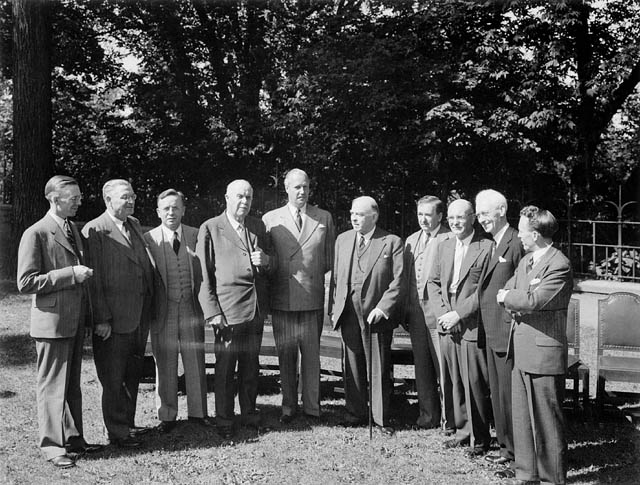
Drew (at the centre) at the Dominion-Provincial Conference on Reconstruction

During the spring 1945 Ontario election, Drew ran a red-baiting campaign against the CCF's Ontario section. The previous two years of anti-socialist attacks by the Conservatives and their supporters, like Gladstone Murray and Montague A. Sanderson, were devastatingly effective against the previously popular CCF. Much of the source material for the anti-CCF campaign came from the Ontario Provincial Police (OPP)'s Special Investigation Branch's agent D-208: Captain William J. Osbourne-Dempster. His office was supposed to be investigating wartime fifth column saboteurs. Instead, starting in November 1943, he was investigating, almost exclusively, Ontario opposition MPPs and mainly focused on the CCF caucus. The fact that Jolliffe knew about these 'secret' investigations as early as February 1944 led to one of the most infamous incidents in 20th-century Canadian politics.

The accusation led to Drew ordering the LeBel Royal Commission to investigate the charges made by Jolliffe. The charges stemmed from Ontario's Official Opposition Leader Jolliffe, during the election campaign. He made the allegations during a campaign radio speech on 24 May 1945. Drew announced in a radio speech on 26 May that he would call an inquiry, and he appointed Mr. Justice A. M. LeBel to lead the commission on 28 May. Jolliffe and the Liberal leader, Mitchell Hepburn, made offers to withhold from electioneering and have the commission report before the election. Drew refused to postpone the election or to speed up the commission process. The commission began hearings on 20 June 1945, and heard final arguments on 20 July 1945. The report was issued on 11 October 1945, with LeBel agreeing with much of what Jolliffe charged but ultimately ruling that the premier did not have a secret political police reporting to him, mainly due to the lack of direct documented evidence. In the late 1970s, that documented evidence was found, but the provincial government at the time considered the case closed.

The Conservatives got their majority, as they crushed the CCF on 4 June 1945. Drew's party won 66 out the 90 seats in the legislature and reduced Jolliffe's CCF to just 8 seats, which also meant that it was no longer the Official Opposition. Drew won 20 seats from the CCF directly, including Jolliffe's. The "Gestapo" claims against Drew seemed to do little, if any damage, and the CCF got nearly the same percentage in the popular vote as had been predicted by a Gallup poll one month earlier.

=== Second term ===
==== Hydro ====
Drew's government insisted on spending $400 million in a ten-year program to convert Ontario's electricity system from 25 cycles per second (hertz) to 60, which would standardize it with the rest of North America. The standardization allowed the province to join the North American power grid to easily import and export electricity, a prerequisite for the province's industrial development.

==== Immigration ====
Drew also helped spur postwar immigration to Ontario from 1947 to 1948 by setting up immigration offices throughout the United Kingdom and initiating cheap charter flights to bring an estimated 20,000 British immigrants to the province in what has been called the world's first mass migration by air. Drew, a committed British imperialist, focussed on attracting British immigrants because he felt they were "the right class of people" to bring to Canada.

==== Spending ====
Drew's government also increased funding for roads and highways and also increased funding for schools by increasing the provincial government's share for education spending from 15% to 50%. Through a government that made investments to modernize Ontario, Drew laid the basis for the province's postwar industrial expansion and for a Progressive Conservative dynasty that lasted 42 years and saw six successive Progressive Conservative premiers.

==== 1948 election ====
While the Tories won a majority in the legislature in the 1948 election, Drew himself was defeated in his High Park electoral district, in west-end Toronto, by the CCFer and temperance crusader William "Temperance Willie" Temple, who had targeted Drew over his softening of Ontario's liquour laws by legalizing cocktail bars in Ontario. Drew blamed a supposed future communist takeover of Ontario on the failure of Ontarians to re-elect him.

== Federal politics ==
While it would have been easy enough for Drew to re-enter the legislature by running in a by-election, Drew decided to enter federal politics. "Colonel Drew" (as he liked to be called) won the 1948 federal Progressive Conservative leadership convention, defeating John Diefenbaker on the first ballot.

Progressive Conservative Party Member of Parliament (MP) George Russell Boucher resigned his Carleton seat so that Drew could then contest it in a by-election in order to enter the House of Commons. The federal Co-operative Commonwealth Federation (CCF) was determined to defeat him, so they ran Eugene Forsey as their candidate. Bill Temple was brought up from Toronto to appear at a political meeting in Richmond, Ontario's Town Hall, where Forsey and Drew were speaking. He accused the Tory leader of being "a tool of the liquor interests" and also made suggestions about Drew's sobriety. Throughout the evening Drew grew more red-faced and explosive every time Temple spoke. Finally, after Drew misheard Temple calling him dishonest, the two men were restrained before they could come to physical blows with each other. A riot was barely averted, and the meeting had to be terminated. On December 20, 1948, Drew soundly defeated Forsey by over 8,000 votes — forcing the CCF candidate to lose his deposit — and went on to sit in Parliament. As leader of the federal Progressive Conservative Party and now an MP, he became Leader of the Opposition.

In the 1949 and 1953 federal elections, Drew's Tories were defeated handily by the Liberals, led by Louis St. Laurent. As a federal politician, Drew alienated potential supporters in Quebec when it was remembered that he had called French-Canadians a "defeated race". This rhetoric may not have been as damaging among some English-Canadian voters when he had been a provincial politician, but it was now used against him by his federal opponents. His support for conscription during World War II also hurt his prospects among French-Canadian voters. He ran against Forsey again in the Carleton district and defeated him by an even wider margin on June 27, 1949.

Drew led the PCs into one more general election in 1953, with slightly better results than the previous election. In poor health following a nearly fatal attack of meningitis, Drew resigned as Progressive Conservative leader on September 21, 1956, and was succeeded by John Diefenbaker. On 12 December 1956 he received the Key to the City of Ottawa.

== Later life ==
From 1957 to 1964 he served as Canadian High Commissioner to the United Kingdom and meanwhile worked with the newspaper baron and fellow Canadian Lord Beaverbrook in an attempt to influence British public opinion against joining the European Common Market, which Drew saw as a threat to the British Commonwealth.

Drew served as the first Chancellor of the University of Guelph from 1965 to 1971. In 1967, "for his services in government," he entered the newly created Order of Canada as a Companion. In November 1972, he had a heart attack and was admitted to Wellesley Hospital on November 19. His condition worsened due to congestive heart failure, and he slipped into and out of consciousness in late December and early January. In 1973, Drew died of heart failure in his Wellesley Hospital room at 78. He requested not to receive a state funeral and had a public family funeral in Toronto. He was buried in his family's plot, next to his first wife, Fiorenza Johnson, in the Woodlawn Cemetery in Guelph.

== Honorary degrees ==
George Drew received honorary degrees from several universities including the following:

Country	Date	School	Degree
Ontario	1945	University of Toronto	Doctor of Laws (LL.D)
Ontario	11 June 1947	University of Western Ontario	Doctor of Laws (LL.D)

== Archives ==
George Drew Archives are held at Library and Archives Canada and the Archives of Ontario.

== Books and articles ==
- Genizi, Haim (2002). The Holocaust, Israel, and Canadian Protestant Churches. Montreal: McGill University Press. ISBN 0773524010.

== Electoral record (federal) ==
1953 Canadian federal election: Carleton
Party	Candidate	Votes	%	±%
Progressive Conservative	George Drew	20,137	55.25	+2.26
Liberal	John H. McDonald	14,676	40.26	–0.45
Co-operative Commonwealth	Stewart I. Crawford	1,075	2.95	–3.35
Social Credit	Eric Kingsley Fallis	562	1.54	
Total valid votes		36,450	100.0	
Progressive Conservative hold		Swing		+1.36

1949 Canadian federal election: Carleton
Party	Candidate	Votes	%	±%
Progressive Conservative	George Drew	18,141	52.99	–23.28
Liberal	John H. McDonald	13,937	40.71	
Co-operative Commonwealth	Eugene Forsey	2,155	6.30	–14.63
Total valid votes		34,233	100.0	
Progressive Conservative hold		Swing		–32.00

== References and notes ==
Political offices
Preceded by George Stewart Henry	Leader of the Opposition in the Ontario Legislature; 1939–1943	Succeeded by Ted Jolliffe
Preceded by John Bracken	Leader of the Progressive Conservative Party; 1948–1956	Succeeded by John Diefenbaker
Preceded by John Bracken	Leader of the Official Opposition in the House of Commons of Canada; 1948–1956	Succeeded by John Diefenbaker
Parliament of Canada
Preceded by George Russell Boucher	Member of Parliament from Carleton; 1948–1957	Succeeded by Dick Bell
Diplomatic posts
Preceded by Norman Robertson	Canadian High Commissioner to the United Kingdom; 1957–1964	Succeeded by Lionel Chevrier
Academic offices
New office	Chancellor of the University of Guelph; 1965–1971	Succeeded by Emmett Hall
