= John Rochester (politician) =

Canadian politician

John Rochester Jr.
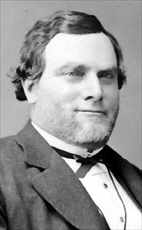
- John Rochester Jr.

7th Mayor of Ottawa
- In office 1870–1871
- Preceded by: Henry J. Friel
- Succeeded by: Eugène Martineau

Member of the Canadian Parliament for Carleton
- In office 1872–1882
- Preceded by: John Holmes
- Succeeded by: John A. Macdonald

Personal details
- Born: May 22, 1822 Rouses Point, New York
- Died: July 19, 1894 (aged 72) Ottawa, Canada
- Party: Conservative
- Spouse: Elizabeth Ann Bevitt
- Children: 9

John Rochester Jr. (May 22, 1822 – September 19, 1894) was a Canadian industrialist, mayor of Ottawa, Ontario from 1870 to 1871, and a member of the House of Commons of Canada representing Carleton from 1872 to 1882.

He was born at Rouses Point, New York in 1822 and first came to Bytown with his family in 1827. He was the son of John Rochester Sr., born in Berwick on Tweed, England in 1786, and his wife Barbara Young, born 1790 in Sunderland, Northumbria, England. There were nine offspring: Susanah (James Anderson), James (Ann Frost), Elizabeth (McLaughlin), George (Marion Baillie), John Jr. (Elizabeth Bevitt), Mary Ann (George Honey Preston), Emily (Cressle, Norman), William (Helen Baillie), Margaret (William Bunting). The Rochesters were a pioneer family in early Bytown that branched out into timber and mining enterprise across the Canadian shield. Many Rochesters had distinguished military careers.

Other early Ottawa Valley names, besides marriages listed above, connected to the Rochester family include: Cole, McDougal, Church, McLaren, and Bryson, to name but a few.

His father John Rochester Sr. and elder brother James established a brewery in 1829 (which he took over in 1856 and sold to James in 1870) and he also opened a tannery at that time and operated two sawmills at Chaudière Falls on the shore of the Ottawa River in the Lebreton Flats area of Ottawa. The area, south of Lebreton and bounded today by Bronson, Booth, Rochester and Preston Streets was once Rochesterville before amalgamation with Ottawa.

John Rochester Jr. was for 11 years a member of Ottawa City Council. He was a staunch Wesleyan Methodist and helped establish a local order of the Orange Lodge and was also a Freemason. He co-founded the Ottawa Free Press, was vice-president of the Ottawa Agricultural Insurance Company and was a partner with former Ottawa Mayor John Bower Lewis in the Metropolitan Trust and Loan Company.

In 1845, he married Elizabeth Ann Bevitt. He served as president of the Ottawa Saint George's Society and the Ottawa Ladies' College. Rochester died in Ottawa at the age of 72 after suffering for several weeks from a kidney ailment.

== Electoral record ==
1878 Canadian federal election: Carleton, Ontario
Party	Candidate	Votes	%	±%
Conservative	John Rochester	1,282	49.73	+2.65
Unknown	John May	1,196	46.39	
Unknown	J. A. Grant	86	3.34	
Unknown	Nicholas Sparks Jr.	14	0.54	
Total valid votes		2,578	100.0	
Conservative hold		Swing		
Source: Canadian Elections Database

1874 Canadian federal election: Carleton, Ontario
Party	Candidate	Votes	%	±%
Conservative	John Rochester	870	47.08	–5.89
Unknown	John Holmes	631	34.15	–12.46
Unknown	J. Wallace	347	18.78	
Total valid votes		1,848	100.0	
Conservative hold		Swing		+3.28
Source: Canadian Elections Database

1872 Canadian federal election: Carleton, Ontario
Party	Candidate	Votes	%	±%
Conservative	John Rochester	1,024	52.97	+4.91
Unknown	John Holmes	901	46.61	–5.33
Unknown	William Montgomery	6	0.31	
Unknown	J. Mills	2	0.10	
Total valid votes		1,933	100.0	
Conservative gain from Liberal–Conservative		Swing		+5.12
Source: Canadian Elections Database

1867 Canadian federal election: Carleton, Ontario
Party	Candidate	Votes	%
Liberal–Conservative	John Holmes	1,087	51.94
Conservative	John Rochester	1,006	48.06
Total valid votes		2,093	100.0
Source: Canadian Elections Database
