= Peter Reilly (politician) =

Canadian politician

Member of Parliament for Ottawa West
- In office 30 October 1972 – 8 July 1974
- Preceded by: Lloyd Francis
- Succeeded by: Lloyd Francis

Personal details
- Born: 26 November 1933 Toronto, Ontario, Canada
- Died: 15 March 1977 (aged 43) Toronto, Ontario, Canada
- Party: Progressive Conservative
- Profession: broadcaster, journalist

Peter Reilly (26 November 1933 – 15 March 1977) was a Progressive Conservative member of the House of Commons of Canada. He was a broadcaster and journalist by career and helped launch both W5 on the CTV Television Network and The Fifth Estate on CBC.

== Career ==
Peter Reilly was Director of News and Public Affairs at CTV News and was the first executive producer and host of public affairs show W5 in 1966 until he called a press conference a few weeks into the show's first season announcing that he was resigning from the network due to interference from CTV board chair and principal shareholder John W. H. Bassett. He then moved to CBC Television where he joined the current affairs show Sunday as co-host.

He entered politics and was elected at the Ottawa West riding in the 1972 general election and served his term in the 29th Canadian Parliament before being defeated in the 1974 election by Lloyd Francis of the Liberal party.

During his term as Member of Parliament, Reilly was in conflict with former Prime Minister and fellow party member John Diefenbaker whom he charged was undermining the leadership of Progressive Conservative leader Robert Stanfield. This feud began in early 1973 when Stanfield, Reilly and other house members supported a federal bilingualism initiative, which Diefenbaker and several other members opposed.

Following his departure from Parliament, Reilly returned to broadcasting with CBC Television as one of the founding reporters of The Fifth Estate. One of his reports was broadcast on 15 March 1977, the same day that he died at his Toronto residence from an apparent case of heart failure.
