= Larry Zolf =

Canadian journalist and commentator

Larry Zolf (July 19, 1934 – March 14, 2011) was a Canadian journalist and commentator.

Zolf was born in Winnipeg, Manitoba. He earned a B.A. from the University of Winnipeg, and then received a Master's degree in Canadian history from the University of Toronto. In 1962, he joined the CBC. During the 1960s he was one of the hosts of the CBC's controversial current-affairs show This Hour Has Seven Days and its replacement series Sunday.

In 1965, Zolf's documentary on computers won the Anik Award. This documentary was later rebroadcast as one of Canada's 100 best documentaries on the 50th anniversary of the National Film Board.

During the Munsinger Affair, a 1966 sex scandal involving former federal Minister of Defence Pierre Sévigny, Zolf showed up on Sévigny's doorstep in pursuit of the story, and Sévigny promptly hit Zolf over the head with his cane.

In 1970, Zolf covered the October Crisis in Quebec for the CBC.

In October 1971, Zolf invited feminist Germaine Greer and anti-abortion politician Joe Borowski on his program to discuss the emergence of second-wave feminism. During the program, however, Zolf launched his own attack on Greer, accusing her of "ignoring ethnic and class differences among women." Greer responded by accusing him of fabricating sections of her book (The Female Eunuch, in fact, contained no "section" on truck drivers) and told him, "I never suggested any such thing. I cannot have you sitting here distorting my book for the people who are foolish enough to think that you know about things."

Though he was raised in a socialist milieu and maintained a strong sympathy for labour, Zolf described himself politically as "a Diefenbaker, Bill Davis, Dalton Camp Red Tory." He worked for Camp in the late 1960s after the cancellation of This Hour Has Seven Days.

While retired from the CBC, he continued to contribute a column to the CBC's website until 2007. After leaving CBC Online he contributed occasional opinion pieces to the National Post. He also published several books during his lifetime, including memoirs and works of humorous political commentary.

Zolf is the father of award-winning poet Syd Zolf. He is buried in Toronto's Mount Pleasant Cemetery.

== Bibliography ==
- Dance of the Dialectic (1973)
- Just Watch Me: Remembering Pierre Trudeau (1984)
- Survival of the Fattest: An Irreverent View of the Senate (1985)
- Scorpions for Sale (1989)
- Zolf (1999)
- The Dialectical Dancer (2010)
