= Sunday (Canadian TV program) =

Canadian current affairs television series

- Genre: Current affairs
- Presented by: Robert Hoyt; Larry Zolf; Peter Reilly; Leonard Cohen; Ian Tyson
- Country of origin: Canada
- Original language: English
- No. of seasons: 1

Production
- Executive producer: Daryl Duke
- Running time: 60 minutes

Original release
- Network: CBC Television
- Release: 6 November 1966 – 16 April 1967

Sunday is a Canadian current affairs television program that aired on CBC Television from 1966 to 1967.

== Premise ==
This program was created to replace the This Hour Has Seven Days, which the CBC had cancelled amid significant controversy. Sunday was hosted by journalists Robert Hoyt, Larry Zolf, and Peter Reilly, accompanied by musicians Leonard Cohen and Ian Tyson. Hoyt and Zolf were previously with This Hour Has Seven Days while Reilly returned to the CBC after dissatisfaction with the private network CTV where he helped establish W5. Executive producer Daryl Duke returned to the CBC after a stint in the United States producing talk shows for Les Crane and Steve Allen.

Sunday resembled This Hour Has Seven Days in the use of music, a studio audience and a combination of satire, interviews and information. Musical guests included Joan Baez, Ian and Sylvia, Phil Ochs, Otis Redding, The Staple Singers and the Metropolitan Toronto Police Choir. The program included controversial subjects such as sexuality, including the documentary "Exit 19" on the sexual revolution. Another episode featured an interview with German Neo-Nazi leader Adolph von Thadden who claimed he was merely misunderstood.

Viewership of Sunday was limited and the program was cancelled after its only season. Its last episode featured an interview with Martin Luther King Jr. The CBC created a new public affairs program, The Way It Is, for the 1967–68 season.

== Reception ==
Senator Grattan O'Leary objected to the high cost of what he considered a "third-rate program" as Sunday's production consumed approximately $50,000 per episode. Prior to O'Leary's comments, CBC president Alphonse Ouimet stood before the Senate's finance committee to defend the program.

== Scheduling ==
This hour-long program was broadcast on Sundays at 10:00 p.m. (Eastern time) from 6 November 1966 to 16 April 1967.
