= George Lemuel Dickinson =

Canadian politician

Member of the Canadian Parliament for Carleton
- In office 1888–1891
- Preceded by: John A. Macdonald
- Succeeded by: William Thomas Hodgins

Personal details
- Born: July 4, 1848; Toronto, Canada West
- Died: November 7, 1930 (Aged 82)
- Political party: Conservative Party of Canada
- Profession: Politician

George Lemuel Dickinson (July 4, 1848 – November 7, 1930) was a manufacturer and political figure in Ontario, Canada. He represented Carleton in the House of Commons of Canada from 1888 to 1891 as a Conservative member.

He was born in Toronto, the son of Moss Kent Dickinson and Elizabeth Mary Trigge. Dickinson was educated in Ottawa and Poughkeepsie, New York. He served as deputy reeve for North Gower in 1877 and 1878. He was first elected to the House of Commons in an 1888 by-election held after Sir John A. Macdonald chose to sit for the Kingston riding. Dickinson was unsuccessful when he ran for reelection in 1891.

1891 Canadian federal election: Carleton, Ontario
Party	Candidate	Votes	%	±%
Conservative	William Thomas Hodgins	1,494	50.73	
Conservative	George Lemuel Dickinson	1,451	49.27	–12.30
Total valid votes		2,945	100.0	
Conservative hold		Swing		
