= William Foster Garland =

Canadian politician

Willian Foster Garland
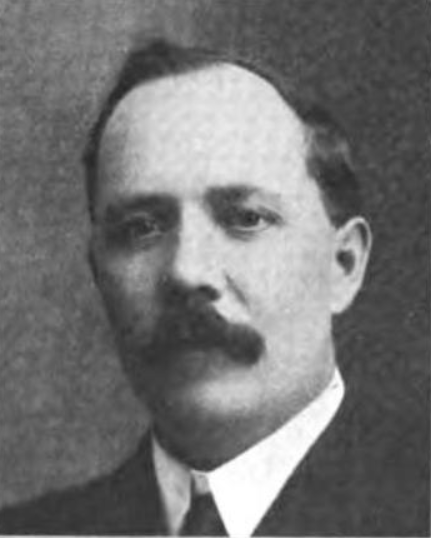
- Garland in 1914

Member of the Canadian Parliament for Carleton
- In office 1921–1935
- Preceded by: George Boyce
- Succeeded by: Alonzo Hyndman
- In office 1912–1917
- Preceded by: Edward Kidd
- Succeeded by: George Boyce

Personal details
- Born: July 1, 1875 Bells Corners, Ontario, Canada
- Died: March 19, 1941 (aged 65)
- Party: Conservative
- Education: Ontario College of Pharmacy
- Profession: Pharmacist

William Foster Garland (July 1, 1875 – March 19, 1941) was an Ontario merchant and political figure. He represented Carleton in the House of Commons of Canada as a Conservative member from 1912 to 1917 and from 1921 to 1935.

He was born in Bells Corners, Ontario in 1875, the son of Absalom Garland. He studied at the Ontario College of Pharmacy and became a druggist. In 1902, he married Margaret Green. Garland served on Ottawa City Council in 1912, representing Victoria Ward. He was first elected to the House of Commons in a 1912 by-election held after the death of Edward Kidd. Garland owned a drug store and lived in the Hintonburg neighbourhood of Ottawa.

== Electoral record ==
1930 Canadian federal election: Carleton
| Party | Candidate | Votes | % | ±% |
|---|---|---|---|---|
| Conservative | William Foster Garland | 7,317 | 43.78 | –12.57 |
| Liberal | Mortimer Newton Cummings | 7,027 | 42.05 | –1.60 |
| Independent Conservative | Robert Ormond Morris | 2,369 | 14.17 | |
| Total valid votes | | 16,713 | 100.0 | |
| Conservative hold | | Swing | | –5.48 |
Source: lop.parl.ca

1926 Canadian federal election: Carleton
| Party | Candidate | Votes | % | ±% |
|---|---|---|---|---|
| Conservative | William Foster Garland | 7,415 | 56.35 | –1.09 |
| Liberal | Mortimer Newton Cummings | 5,744 | 43.65 | +1.09 |
| Total valid votes | | 13,159 | 100.0 | |
| Conservative hold | | Swing | | –1.09 |

1925 Canadian federal election: Carleton
| Party | Candidate | Votes | % | ±% |
|---|---|---|---|---|
| Conservative | William Foster Garland | 7,757 | 57.44 | +16.15 |
| Liberal | Mortimer Newton Cummings | 5,748 | 42.56 | +11.67 |
| Total valid votes | | 13,505 | 100.0 | |
| Conservative hold | | Swing | | +2.24 |

1921 Canadian federal election: Carleton
| Party | Candidate | Votes | % | ±% |
|---|---|---|---|---|
| Conservative | William Foster Garland | 5,537 | 41.29 | –25.18 |
| Liberal | William Lochead Gourlay | 4,142 | 30.89 | –2.64 |
| Progressive | Bower Henry | 3,474 | 25.91 | |
| Independent | Edward Hill Good | 257 | 1.92 | |
| Total valid votes | | 13,410 | 100.0 | |
| Conservative hold | | Swing | | –11.27 |

Canadian federal by-election, 30 October 1912 On the death of Edward Kidd, 16 September 1912
| Party | Candidate | Votes |
|---|---|---|
| Conservative | William Foster Garland | acclaimed |
