= David Daubney =

Canadian politician

Member of Parliament
- In office 1984–1988
- Preceded by: Lloyd Francis
- Succeeded by: Marlene Catterall
- Constituency: Ottawa West

Personal details
- Born: July 23, 1947 Windsor, Ontario, Canada
- Died: August 28, 2025 (aged 78)
- Party: Progressive Conservative

David Bruce Daubney (July 23, 1947 – August 28, 2025) was a Canadian politician who served in the House of Commons of Canada from 1984 to 1988. He represented the electoral district of Ottawa West as a member of the Progressive Conservative Party of Canada caucus.

Following his defeat in the 1988 election, Daubney was a senior policy advisor in the federal Department of Justice until his retirement in 2011, and has served on the board of the Ottawa Public Library. An outspoken critic of the contemporary Conservative Party of Canada, he endorsed the Liberal candidate in his riding in both the 2011 election and the 2015 election.
