= John Holmes (Ontario politician) =

Canadian politician

Member of the Canadian Parliament for Carleton
- In office 1867–1872
- Preceded by: Riding created (See Canadian Confederation)
- Succeeded by: John Rochester

Personal details
- Born: 1828; Newtownforbes, County Longford, Ireland
- Died: September 22, 1879 (aged 50–51); Christchurch, New Zealand
- Political party: Liberal-Conservative Party
- Profession: Politician, Surveyor

John Holmes (1828 – 22 September 1879) was a Canadian politician and surveyor.

== Biography ==
Holmes was born in Newtownforbes, County Longford, Ireland in 1828, the son of Alexander Holmes, and was educated in Ireland. He came to Upper Canada in 1846 and settled in Huntley Township where he became a provincial land surveyor. He married Eliza Graham. Holmes served seven years as reeve for the township and was also warden for Carleton County for five years. He served as captain in the local militia from 1866 to 1875.

Elected in the Canadian federal election of 1867, he served as the Liberal-Conservative Member of Parliament representing the riding of Carleton in the province of Ontario. He was defeated in the 1872 and 1874 elections, and never again sat in Parliament. He died in Christchurch, New Zealand in 1879.

== Electoral record ==
1874 Canadian federal election: Carleton, Ontario
Party	Candidate	Votes	%	±%
Conservative	John Rochester	870	47.08	–5.89
Unknown	John Holmes	631	34.15	–12.46
Unknown	J. Wallace	347	18.78	
Total valid votes		1,848	100.0	
Conservative hold		Swing		+3.28
Source: Canadian Elections Database

1872 Canadian federal election: Carleton, Ontario
Party	Candidate	Votes	%	±%
Conservative	John Rochester	1,024	52.97	+4.91
Unknown	John Holmes	901	46.61	–5.33
Unknown	William Montgomery	6	0.31	
Unknown	J. Mills	2	0.10	
Total valid votes		1,933	100.0	
Conservative gain from Liberal–Conservative		Swing		+5.12
Source: Canadian Elections Database

1867 Canadian federal election: Carleton, Ontario
Party	Candidate	Votes	%
Liberal–Conservative	John Holmes	1,087	51.94
Conservative	John Rochester	1,006	48.06
Total valid votes		2,093	100.0
Source: Canadian Elections Database
