= Kenneth Binks =

Canadian politician (1925–2018)

Member of the Canadian Parliament for Ottawa West
- In office 1979–1980
- Preceded by: Lloyd Francis
- Succeeded by: Lloyd Francis

Personal details
- Born: Kenneth Charles Binks; 19 May 1925 Ottawa, Ontario, Canada
- Died: 14 September 2018 (aged 93) Toronto, Ontario, Canada
- Party: Progressive Conservative
- Occupation: lawyer

Kenneth C. Binks, QC (19 May 1925 – 14 September 2018) was a Progressive Conservative party member of the House of Commons of Canada.

Born in Ottawa, Ontario, he was a lawyer by career. He represented the Ontario riding of Ottawa West during the short-lived 31st Canadian Parliament after winning the seat in the 1979 federal election. He lost the 1980 election to Cyril Lloyd Francis of the Liberal party.

Binks made two unsuccessful attempts to enter Canadian Parliament in 1965 federal election at the Russell riding and in 1968 at Ottawa—Carleton riding.

His family has lived in the Ottawa area for 126 years and were members of the business and professional community for 4 generations. He was educated in the Public and High Schools of Ottawa. He attended Queen's University and graduated with honors in Modern History and completed graduate studies for Master of Arts. He tutored in the History Department.

In 1949, he married Jean Donalda Holman of Outlook Saskatchewan, and together they moved to England where Ken attended Cambridge University where he studied law. He completed his legal studies at the University of Saskatchewan in 1952, and was admitted to the Bar of Saskatchewan in 1953, and in Ontario in 1953. From 1954 to 1956 he was Senior Assistant Crown Attorney for Carleton County(Ottawa) and from 1958 to 1988 senior partner at Binks & Chilcott, a firm specializing in national and international advocacy. He was made a Queen's Counsel in 1964.

In 1991 he was appointed a Judge of the General Division, now Superior Court of the Province of Ontario. In 1998 he was appointed a Member of the Canada Pension Appeals Board. He retired from the Superior Court of Ontario in May 2000 and joined the firm of Beament Green as Counsel.

Judge Binks was the author of Canada's Parliamentary Library, published in 1979, a member of the Canadian Bar Association, The International Bar Association, The Advocates Society, The National Press Club and The Cambridge Union.

He died of complications following a stroke in Sunnybrook Hospital, Toronto on 14 September 2018.

== Electoral record ==
1965 Canadian federal election: Russell
Party	Candidate	Votes
Liberal	Paul Tardif	28,997
Progressive Conservative	Kenneth Binks	15,718
New Democratic	Harold B. Wilson	7,186
