= D. Aubrey Moodie =

Douglas Aubrey Moodie (22 July 1908 – 17 May 2008) was reeve of Nepean Township, Ontario from 1954 to 1969 and was known as the "Father of Nepean". He was born in Bells Corners, Nepean Township, Ontario. He was a descendant of Robert Moodie.

Moodie, a farmer, joined Nepean council as the acclaimed deputy reeve in 1950 and served in that role until becoming reeve four years later. Moodie lost to Andy Haydon in the 1969 municipal election. Nepean had changed a lot since Moodie's heyday, with many new subdivisions that backed Haydon. He returned to Nepean Council from 1973 to 1976. In 1958, during his term as reeve, lot levies were introduced for housing developments in the township. He also lobbied for the creation of the Queensway Carleton Hospital and sat on its first board of directors. Moodie was a well known supporter of the Progressive Conservative Party of Canada.

By 2005, Moodie lived in a Richmond, Ontario nursing home, but remained in good health. His autobiography, The Spirit of Nepean (ISBN 0973335505), was published in 2003 with the assistance of Andrea McCormick. Moodie died at Ottawa's Queensway Carleton Hospital on 17 May 2008 aged 99.

D. Aubrey Moodie Intermediate School in Bells Corners and Moodie Drive, a major thoroughfare in the region, were named in his honour.
