= Andrew Haydon (senator) =

Canadian politician (1867–1932)

The Honourable Andrew Haydon
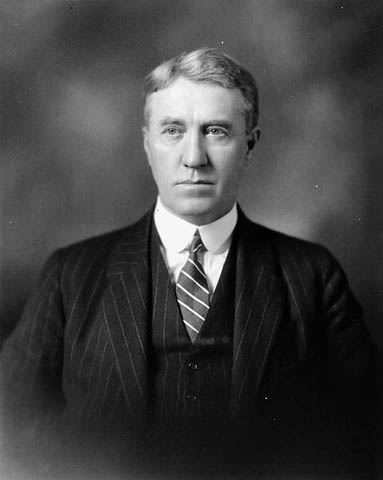

Canadian Senator from Ontario
- In office March 10, 1924 – November 10, 1932
- Appointed by: William Lyon Mackenzie King

Personal details
- Born: June 28, 1867 Pakenham, Ontario, Canada
- Died: November 10, 1932 (aged 65) Ottawa, Ontario, Canada
- Party: Liberal
- Spouse: Euphemia Macdonald Scott (m. 1902)

Andrew Haydon (June 28, 1867 – November 10, 1932) was a Canadian lawyer and senator.

== Background ==
Born in Pakenham, Ontario, the son of James Haydon, a British immigrant, and Eleanor Sadler, he received a Master of Arts degree in 1893 and a Bachelor of Law degree in 1895 from Queen's University. He graduated from Osgoode Hall Law School in 1897 and was soon after called to the Ontario Bar. He practiced law in Lanark, Ontario from 1897 to 1899 and then in Ottawa. He was Secretary of the 1919 National Liberal Convention and General Secretary of the National Liberal Organization Committee from 1920 to 1922. In 1924, he was appointed to the Senate of Canada representing the senatorial division of Ottawa, Ontario. He served until his death.

He was the author of Pioneer Sketches of The District of Bathurst (Lanark and Renfrew Counties, Ontario) (The Ryerson Press, 1925) and Mackenzie King and the Liberal Party (Allen, 1930).

In 1902, he married Euphemia Macdonald Scott from Stafford Springs, Connecticut. They had one son, Andrew Scott Haydon (1903–1968), and one daughter, Eleanor Haydon (1905–1914). His son Andrew was the father of Andrew S. Haydon, former Regional Chair of Ottawa–Carleton.
