= George Russell Boucher =

Canadian politician

Member of the Canadian Parliament for Carleton
- In office 1940–1948
- Preceded by: Alonzo Hyndman
- Succeeded by: George A. Drew

Personal details
- Born: December 13, 1899 Dunrobin, Ontario, Canada
- Died: November 8, 1970 (aged 70)
- Party: Progressive Conservative (from 1945); Conservative (until 1945)
- Occupation: Barrister

George Russell Boucher (December 13, 1899 – November 8, 1970) was a Canadian politician and barrister.

Born in Dunrobin, Ontario, Boucher (pronounced like voucher, not as in the French) was elected to the House of Commons of Canada in an August 1940 by-election as a Member of the Conservative Party to represent the riding of Carleton. He succeeded Alonzo Hyndman who died shortly after his re-election in the March 1940 federal election. He was a member of the Joint Committee on Location of the Seat of Government in the City of Ottawa. Boucher was re-elected in 1945 as a Progressive Conservative. He resigned his seat in 1948 in order to allow new party leader George A. Drew, who did not have a seat in the House of Commons, to contest Carleton in a by-election.

== Electoral record ==
1945 Canadian federal election: Carleton
Party	Candidate	Votes	%	±%
Progressive Conservative	G. Russell Boucher	10,916	62.26	–18.04
Liberal	Leonard Anthony Davis	5,309	30.28	
Co-operative Commonwealth	Douglas D. Irwin	1,309	7.47	
Total valid votes		17,534	100.0	
Progressive Conservative hold		Swing		–24.16

Canadian federal by-election, 19 August 1940 On the death of Alonzo Hyndman, 9 April 1940
Party	Candidate	Votes	%	±%
Conservative	George Russell Boucher	6,045	80.30	+26.40
New Democracy	John Nelson McCracken	1,483	19.70	
Total valid votes		7,528	100.0	
Conservative hold		Swing		

== Notes ==
- George Russell Boucher – Parliament of Canada biography
