= Robert O. Pickard Environmental Centre =

Water treatment facility in Ottawa, Ontario

Coordinates: 45.46204°N 75.58948°W

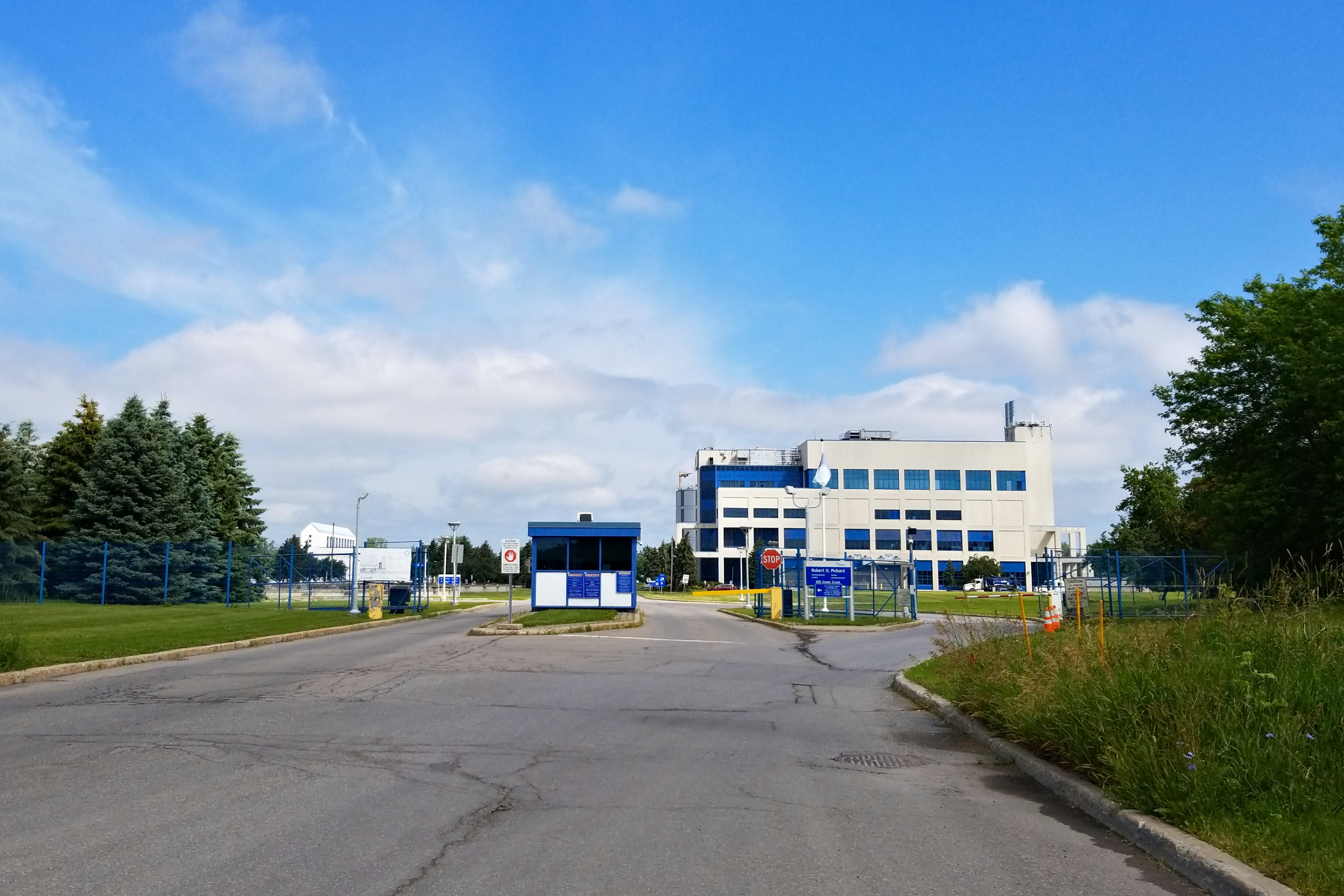
Robert O. Pickard Environmental Centre

The Robert O. Pickard Environmental Centre is a waste water treatment facility in Ottawa, Ontario, Canada. It provides secondary treatment to more than 90% of Ottawa's population, over 900,000 people.

It is located at 800 Green Creek Drive, Ottawa, Ontario, and discharges to the Ottawa River. Formerly the Green's Creek Pollution Control Centre, it was built in 1962 as a primary treatment plant, and then expanded in 1971 and 1975 to accommodate Ottawa's growing needs. Major expansion and rehabilitation occurred between 1988 and 1993, which improved biosolid processing and added odour control measures. This improved the level of treatment from primary treatment to include biological secondary treatment. Addition of dechlorination processes was performed in 2013, allowing chlorine to be removed from the treated water prior to being discharged into the Ottawa river.

In April 1990, the centre was renamed to the Robert O. Pickard Environmental Centre, for Robert O. Pickard, a retired Commissioner of Works in the former Regional Municipality of Ottawa-Carleton.

It is also one of Canada's largest wastewater treatment facilities.
