= Nepean Township =

Coordinates: 45°16′07″N 75°46′00″W

Nepean Township is a former incorporated and now geographic township in Eastern Ontario, Canada, now part of the City of Ottawa.

Originally known as Township D, it was established in 1792. In 1800, it became part of Carleton County and was incorporated as a township in 1850. The first settler in the township was Jehiel Collins, from Vermont, who settled in an area near the Ottawa River which later became part of Bytown. Over the years, parts of Nepean Township were annexed by the expanding city of Ottawa. The original town hall of the township of Nepean was located in Westboro, which became part of Ottawa in 1949. A new town hall was built in Bells Corners in 1966. Nepean was incorporated as a city in 1978 and became part of the amalgamated city of Ottawa in 2001.

Nepean Township took its name from Sir Evan Nepean, British Under-Secretary of State for the Home Department from 1782 to 1791. According to the Canada 2001 Census, the Township (original boundaries) had a population of 339,708.

The 1850 boundaries of Nepean Township were the Ottawa River on the north, the Rideau River on the east, approximately along where Bankfield Road and Brophy Drive are today on the south, and approximately where Eagleson Road, March Road, and Hertzberg Road are today through to Shirleys Bay on the west. The township included much of what is now Ottawa, all of the former City of Nepean, and parts of the former City of Kanata. To the west of Nepean Township was Goulbourn and March Townships, to the east Gloucester Township, and to the south North Gower Township.

... in 1848 Nepean commenced to run its own affairs alone. There were 169 ratepayers in the Township entitled to vote that year, and the Town Wardens were John Robertson and Samuel Collins; Clerk, James Shanley; 1849 (last year of the old system) - Town Wardens were Chester Chapman, John Scott; Assessor - James Spain; Collector - E.L. Wood. The Town meeting to elect the first Council under the new system was held at Bell's Corners, January 7, 1850, when Frederick Bearman, J.P., Chester Chapman, James Spain, John Robertson, J.P., Michael Grady, John Scott, G.W. Baker, William Foster and John Thompson ran for Councillors - the five first-named being elected. These were all present at the first Council meeting held at the same place, January 21, 1850, when Colonel Frederick Bearman was chosen Reeve. He resigned in December 1850 and Chester Chapman succeeded to the vacant position for the balance of the term. The same Council were re-elected in 1851. Mr Chapman was again chosen Reeve, and James Spain, Deputy - and the same gentlemen held the same positions during 1852 and 1853. In 1854, Mr. Chapman was again chosen Reeve, but declined to act and the place was filled by John Scott.

== Reeves ==
- 1850 - Frederick Bearman
- 1850 - Chester Chapman
- 1854 - John Scott
- 1856 - George Bell
- 1858 - Samuel Davison
- 1862 - Nelson George Robinson
- 1864 - Thomas Graham
- 1865 - John Dawson
- 1873 - Col. John Fenton Bearman
- 1875 - Thomas Clark
- 1886 - John Dawson
- 1890 - John Boyce
- 1893 - James Bearman
- 1896 - George Boyce
- 1897 - William Henderson
- 1897 - James Bearman
- 1900 - Frederick Augustus Heney
- 1905 - John George Clark
- 1906 - Frederick Augustus Heney
- 1913 - Frederick Henry Honeywell
- 1916 - Bower Henry
- 1919 - William Joynt
- 1922 - W. Fred Bell
- 1923 - Walter Lionel Graham
- 1924 - Albert Bentham Ullett
- 1925 - John William Arnott
- 1927 - Robert Green
- 1929 - Robert Ernest Nelson
- 1933 - George Herbert Bradley
- 1938 - Robert Mackie
- 1939 - John Alexander Dawson
- 1945 - Wellington Garfield Cummings
- 1947 - Harry Parslow
- 1949 - Thomas Campbell Keenan
- 1954 - Douglas Aubrey Moodie
- 1970 - Andrew S. Haydon

== See also ==
- List of townships in Ontario
