= John McKellar =

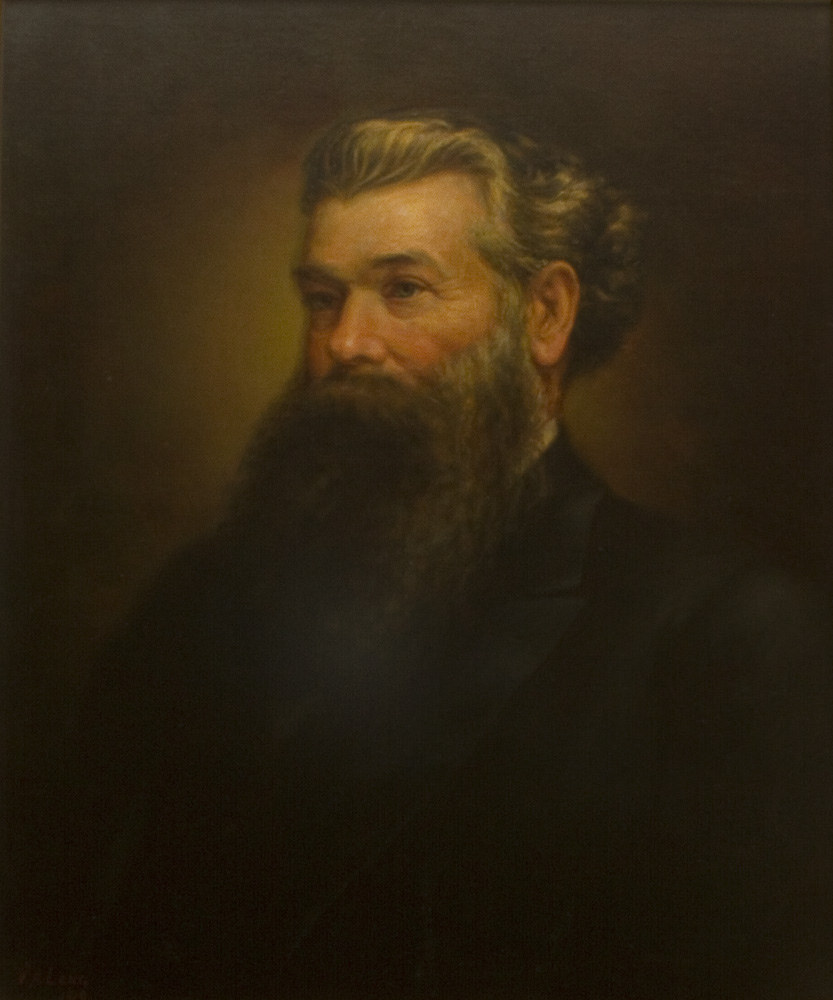
Painting of McKellar circa 1899

John McKellar (June 10, 1833 – February 3, 1900) was a mining prospector, landowner and political figure in Thunder Bay District, Ontario, Canada. He was the first mayor of the town of Fort William, Ontario (later part of Thunder Bay), serving from the town's incorporation in 1892 to 1898.

He was born in Mosa Township, London District, Upper Canada, the son of Duncan McKellar (1807-1875) and Margaret Brodie (1812-1890), both Gaelic-speaking immigrants from Scotland, and was schooled at home. The family moved to the mining district of Ontonagon County in 1855 but left Michigan in 1863 during the American Civil War to explore mining opportunities on the north shore of Lake Superior in the Province of Canada. Duncan McKellar and sons John, Peter and Donald laid claim to a number of mining properties; the profitable mines were generally sold to American interests.

Duncan McKellar and sons established a homestead as squatters on disputed land long claimed by the Hudson Bay Company. With the aid of their prominent kinsman, Reform politician Archibald McKellar, Duncan's eldest son John received a mineral patent in 1875 for 173 acres from the Ontario Department of Crown Lands on the Kaministiquia River which became the commercial centre of Fort William after the Canadian Pacific Railway located its new right-of-way and operations on land owned by the McKellar and McVicar families, and Hudson Bay Company in 1883-1884. The family owned all the land from Vickers Street to May Street and from Dease Street to Main. As a result, they were determined to make this land as valuable as possible. Politics was the best way to do so.

== Political career ==
McKellar served on the council of the municipality of Shuniah which governed the Lakehead townships, from June 1873 until March 1881. He led the movement that resulted in six townships, including Neebing Additional Township where McKellar's property was located, separating from Shuniah and forming a new municipality, known as the Municipality of Neebing. McKellar was elected to every Neebing council from April 1881 to June 1892, serving as reeve of Neebing 1888-92. Because he led efforts to persuade the Ontario Legislature to incorporate the Municipality of Neebing in 1881 and the Town of Fort William in 1892, he is considered as the "founding father" of Fort William. During his tenure as Neebing reeve and the town's first mayor, he oversaw its central business district relocate from the Town Plot to land owned by the McKellar and McVicar families, and the establishment of basic infrastructure (electric power, rudimentary water supply and sewers).

John McKellar died in Fort William at the age of 66, unmarried. He should not be confused with the Carleton county Liberal politician John McKellar (1844-1914) of Gloucester Township.

The principal streets of downtown Fort William bear family names: Donald Street where the Thunder Bay city Hall is located on land donated by the family; Brodie Street; Duncan Street; McKellar Street (formerly John Street); Archibald Street; Luci Court.

The John McKellar Memorial Hospital (later McKellar General Hospital) was named in his honour in 1902.
