= Media in Ottawa–Gatineau =

The following media outlets are located in Canada's National Capital Region, serving the cities of Ottawa, Ontario and Gatineau, Quebec. The two cities, which are adjacent and each receive virtually all television and radio stations operating in either city, are considered a single media market.

Most of the region's FM and TV stations, regardless of which community they are officially licensed to, transmit from Camp Fortune in the Gatineau Hills. Other TV stations transmit from a tower located in Manotick, in the rural south portion of Ottawa. Ryan Tower, the former transmitter tower at Camp Fortune, was taken down on November 4, 2012 and its services and some antenna elements were transferred to a new, nearby tower.

In addition to the market's local media services, Ottawa is also home to several national media operations, including CPAC (Canada's national legislature broadcaster), the digital political newspaper iPolitics, and the parliamentary bureau staff of all of Canada's major newsgathering organizations in television, radio and print. The city is also home to the legal headquarters of the Canadian Broadcasting Corporation, although operational headquarters for English- and French-language services are located in Toronto and Montreal, respectively.

== Radio ==
=== AM stations ===
Frequency	Call sign	Branding	Format	Owner	Notes
AM 580	CFRA	580 CFRA	news/talk	Bell Media Radio	Also available on FM 100.3 via HD Radio
AM 1200	CFGO	TSN 1200 Ottawa	sports	Bell Media Radio	Also available on FM 100.3 via HD Radio
AM 1670	CJEU	Radio Oxygène 1670AM; Radio-Enfant-Ado	children's radio	Fondation Radio-Enfant	French (Gatineau)

=== FM stations ===
Frequency	Call sign	Branding	Format	Owner	Notes
FM 88.5	CILV-FM	Live 88.5	alternative rock/modern rock	Stingray Group	
FM 89.1	CHUO-FM	CHUO FM 89.1	campus radio	University of Ottawa	
FM 89.9	CIHT-FM	Hot 89.9	contemporary hit radio	Stingray Group	
FM 90.7	CBOF-FM	Ici Radio-Canada Première	news/talk	Canadian Broadcasting Corporation	French
FM 91.5	CBO-FM	CBC Radio One	news/talk	Canadian Broadcasting Corporation	
FM 92.3	CJET-FM	92.3 Wow FM	classic hits	My Broadcasting Corporation	licensed to Smiths Falls
FM 92.7	CJVN-FM		Christian radio	Fiston Kalambay	French (Ottawa)
FM 93.1	CKCU-FM	CKCU FM 93.1	campus radio	Carleton University	
FM 93.9	CKKL-FM	Pure Country 94	country music	Bell Media Radio	
FM 94.5	CJFO-FM	Unique FM	community radio	Radio de la communauté francophone d'Ottawa	French (Ottawa)
FM 94.9	CIMF-FM	Rouge FM	adult contemporary	Bell Media Radio	French (Gatineau)
FM 96.5	CFTX-FM	BPM Sports 96.5 Gatineau	sports radio	RNC Media	French (Gatineau)
FM 97.1	CHLX-FM	Rythme FM	adult contemporary	RNC Media	French (Gatineau)
FM 97.5	CKVV-FM	Moose FM	adult hits	Vista Broadcast Group	licensed to Kemptville
FM 97.9	CJLL-FM	CHIN Ottawa	multilingual community	CHIN Radio/TV International	
FM 98.5	CITM-FM	Mix 98.5	hot adult contemporary	Torres Media	
FM 99.1	CHRI-FM	CHRI 99.1	Christian music	Christian Hit Radio	
FM 99.7	CJOT-FM	boom 99.7	classic hits	Corus Entertainment	
FM 100.3	CJMJ-FM	Move 100	adult contemporary	Bell Media Radio	
FM 101.1	CKBY-FM	Country 101.1	country music	Rogers Media	licensed to Smiths Falls
FM 101.7	CIDG-FM	Rebel 101.7	mainstream rock	Torres Media	
FM 102.5	CBOX-FM	Ici Musique	public music	Canadian Broadcasting Corporation	French
FM 103.3	CBOQ-FM	CBC Music	public music	Canadian Broadcasting Corporation	
FM 104.1	CKTF-FM	Énergie	mainstream rock	Bell Media Radio	French (Gatineau)
FM 104.7	CKOF-FM	104,7 FM	Talk radio	Cogeco	French (Gatineau)
FM 105.3	CISS-FM	Kiss FM	hot adult contemporary	Rogers Media	
FM 106.1	CHEZ-FM	Chez 106	mainstream rock	Rogers Media	
FM 106.9	CKQB-FM	Jump FM	contemporary hit radio	Corus Entertainment	
FM 107.9	CKDJ-FM	CKDJ FM 107.9	campus radio	Algonquin College	

=== Internet radio stations ===
Frequency	Branding	Format	Owner	Notes
Internet only	Mix97FM	Urban Contemporary	Mix97fm	
Internet only	Throwback 97 FM	classic hip hop/R&B	Mix97fm	
Internet only	Ici musique Atmosphere	Ambient	CBC	Serving in Gatineau market
Internet only	Ici musique Classique	Classical radio	CBC	Can be listened through 90.7 FM-HD2. Serving in Gatineau market
Internet only	Ici musique Hip Hop	Urban Contemporary	CBC	Serving in Gatineau market
Internet only	Ici imusique Rock	Rock	CBC	Serving in Gatineau market
Internet only	Qub Radio	Talk radio	Quebecor Media	Broadcasting from Montreal, Serving in Gatineau market
Internet only	Radio Alegre Canada	Latin music	Radio Alegre Canada	Serving in Ottawa - Gatineau market

=== Weatheradio ===
Frequency	Call sign	Branding	Format	Owner	Notes
162.550 MHz	VBE 719	Weatheradio Canada	weather alerts	Meteorological Service of Canada	

=== Shortwave (SW) ===
Frequency	Call sign	Branding	Format	Owner	Notes
3330 kHz; 7850 kHz ^{1} 14670 kHz	CHU		time signal	National Research Council of Canada	shortwave radio station.^{1}On January 1, 2009, CHU moved its signal from 7335 kHz to 7850 kHz.

=== Other radio stations ===
The following radio stations that can also be heard in the National Capital Region:

- CHLK-FM 88.1 FM, a community radio station operating out of Perth, Ontario.
- VEF315 88.7 FM, a community radio station operating out of Vankleek Hill, Ontario.
- CKS608 91.9 FM, an ultra-low power campus and internet radio station from La Cité collégiale in Ottawa.
- VF8013 92.3 FM, a very low-power French-language Christian radio station located in Ottawa. Air times of this radio station may vary. See also: VF8012 on 92.3 FM Gatineau, Quebec. The Broadcasting status of VF8013 Ottawa and VF8012 Gatineau are currently unknown.
- CHRC-FM 92.5 FM, a radio station operating out of Clarence-Rockland, Ontario.
- Radio-Hull 106.5 FM, a special events radio station based in Hull, Quebec.
- CJRO-FM 107.7 FM, a very low-power community radio station in Carlsbad Springs, Ontario. CJRO-FM is also heard via low-power transmitters on 107.9 FM Vars/Sarsfield and 107.7 FM Embrun/Russell serving south-east rural Ottawa.
- Some Montreal AM radio stations can also be heard in the area, such as CKGM 690, CKAC 730, and CJAD 800 as well as CKOI-FM in the far eastern parts of Ottawa.

=== AM ===
- 540 AM CJSB, a Ottawa-based radio station that launched in 1982 until it left the air in 1994. The station relaunched on FM at 106.9 MHz as CKQB-FM.
- 970 AM CKCH, ceased operations in 1994.
- 1310 AM CIWW, a Rogers owned CityNews Radio station that shutdown on October 26, 2023.
- 1350 AM CIRA-5, a Gatineau-based French language rebroadcaster of CIRA-FM Montreal ceased operations in early 2015.
- 1350 AM CHFO, a Gatineau-based French language community radio station from 2018 until it left the air in 2019.
- 1630 AM CHYW, a low-power tourist information radio station that operated from the Macdonald-Cartier International Airport from 2001 but its uncertain when the station left the air. In 2005, 2012 and 2017, applications were submitted to the CRTC to operate new radio stations on 1630 kHz to serve Ottawa and Gatineau. Those applications were either denied or withdrawn.

=== FM ===
- Mix FM, was an unlicensed radio station in the Ottawa area that operated on various frequencies, mostly 91.9 FM in 2009, until it was shut down in 2010.
- 96.5 CFDT-FM (east side) and 99.9 CFDT-FM-1 (west side), very low-power tourist information radio stations that served motorists along Highway 417. It is uncertain when or if these stations were ever in operation.
- 96.5 FM was also used in 2002 for a special event radio programming at 96.5 MHz in Gatineau with the call sign CIRC.
- CIIO-FM, operated over various frequencies on 104.7 FM, 99.7 FM and 97.5, a tourist information station owned by Instant Information Services has been off the air since 2011. Instant Information Services also operated CIIF-FM 97.5, also a former french-language tourist information station in Ottawa.
- 95.7 FM CKAV-FM-9, the local outlet of the Aboriginal Voices radio network; off the air since late 2014.
- 95.7 FM CFPO-FM, it broadcast music and talk programming targeting the First Nations community. It ceased operations on September 1, 2025.
- CKO (CKO-1) 106.9 FM was the Ottawa affiliate of the national CKO all-news network which ceased operations in 1989.

== Television ==
Despite being one of Canada's largest metropolitan areas, many of the "local" stations serving Ottawa–Gatineau are, in fact, based in the Greater Toronto Area. Notably, the country's #2 and #3 private-sector broadcast networks, Global and Citytv, respectively, rely on repeaters of their Toronto-based stations, not originating stations, to serve Ottawa viewers. Despite this, however, Ottawa–Gatineau is unique among Canadian television markets, as the only market in all of Canada which has terrestrial access to virtually the entire range of Canadian broadcast networks and systems in both English and French — the larger Toronto, Montreal and Vancouver media markets each lack over-the-air access to some of the services in their market's minority language. The sole exception is aboriginal network APTN, which only has broadcast coverage in the North, but is carried on cable in Ottawa and indeed throughout the country.

Of the fourteen stations available over the air, only six actually originate from the area and provide local news. These six stations are currently owned by only three companies, with two stations apiece: the CBC (with stations for its English and French networks), RNC Media (which owns the local affiliates of the two private French-language networks, TVA and Noovo), and Bell Media (which owns stations associated with its CTV and CTV 2 networks).

Both of the CBC stations carry local evening newscasts in their respective languages. The two Bell Media-owned stations, while nominally maintaining separate news operations, do not currently compete against each other for local news; CTV airs local newscasts at midday and in the evening, while CTV 2 only broadcasts a morning newscast. As for the RNC Media stations, the TVA affiliate carries a local evening newscast, whereas the Noovo affiliate only airs short local news updates.

OTA virtual channel (PSIP)	Actual channel	Rogers Cable (Ottawa)	Vidéotron (Gatineau)	Call sign	Network	Language	Transmitter location	Notes
4.1	25 (UHF)	8	6	CBOT-DT	CBC Television	EN	Camp Fortune, Gatineau	
6.1	14 (UHF)	3	8	CIII-DT-6	Global	EN	Camp Fortune, Gatineau	Rebroadcaster of CIII-DT (Toronto)
9.1	33 (UHF)	5	2	CBOFT-DT	Ici Radio-Canada Télé	FR	Camp Fortune, Gatineau	
11.1	22 (UHF)	18	11	CHCH-DT-1	Independent	EN	Manotick, Ottawa	Rebroadcaster of CHCH-DT (Hamilton)
13.1	16 (UHF)	7	7	CJOH-DT	CTV	EN	Camp Fortune, Gatineau	
14.1	20 (UHF)	14	240	CJMT-DT-2	Omni Television ("Omni 2")	EN	Manotick, Ottawa	Rebroadcaster of CJMT-DT (Toronto)
15.1	15 (UHF)	25	55	CITS-DT-1	Yes TV	EN	Manotick, Ottawa	Rebroadcaster of CITS-DT (Hamilton)
24.1	24 (UHF)	2	10	CICO-DT-24	TVOntario	EN	Camp Fortune, Gatineau	Rebroadcaster of CICA-DT (Toronto)
30.1	30 (UHF)	69	3	CIVO-DT	Télé-Québec	FR	Camp Fortune, Gatineau	Rebroadcaster of CIVM-DT (Montreal)
32.1	32 (UHF)	10	4	CHOT-DT	TVA	FR	Camp Fortune, Gatineau	
34.1	34 (UHF)	11	5	CFGS-DT	Noovo	FR	Camp Fortune, Gatineau	
43.1	35 (UHF)	6	12	CHRO-DT-43	CTV 2	EN	Manotick, Ottawa	Rebroadcaster of CHRO-TV (Pembroke)
60.1	27 (UHF)	16	239	CFMT-DT-2	Omni Television ("Omni 1")	EN	Manotick, Ottawa	Rebroadcaster of CFMT-DT (Toronto)
65.1	17 (UHF)	15	13	CITY-DT-3	Citytv	EN	Manotick, Ottawa	Rebroadcaster of CITY-DT (Toronto)
–	–	22	–	–	Rogers TV	EN	–	Rogers Cable community channel
–	–	23	–	–	TV Rogers	FR	–	Rogers Cable community channel
–	–	–	9	–	MAtv	FR	–	Vidéotron community channel

=== Defunct television stations ===
- CFVO-TV channel 30—the region's first TVA affiliate; broadcast from 1974 to 1977
- CKXT-DT-3 channel 20—local repeater of CKXT-DT Toronto; broadcast from 2008 to 2011

== Newspapers ==
=== Daily ===
- Ottawa Citizen
- Ottawa Sun

=== Weekly ===
- Le Droit

=== College and university ===
- Algonquin Times
- The Charlatan
- Fulcrum
- La Rotonde
- The Otis
- The Leveller

=== Community ===
- Barrhaven Independent
- Barrhaven Weekender
- Canada Chinese News
- Capital Chinese News
- Centretown BUZZ
- Centretown News (Now defunct)
- Cumberland Communiqué
- Ecolatino (Latin/Italian community)
- The Epoch Times (Chinese Edition)
- Glebe Report
- Hogs Back News
- Il Postino (Italian community)
- Image
- Kanata Kourier Standard (Now defunct)
- Kitchissippi Times
- The Low Down to Hull and Back
- La Nouvelle
- Mainstreeter
- Manor Park Chronicle
- Manotick Messenger
- The Manotick Review
- The Mike on a Mic Show
- Muslim Link
- Nepean This Week
- New Edinburgh News
- Newswest (Now defunct)
- OPUS newsmagazine
- L'Ora di Ottawa (Italian community)
- Orleans Star
- The OSCAR
- The Ottawa News
- Ottawa Jewish Bulletin
- Ottawa South Weekender
- Ottawa This Week (various)
- Ottawa Weekend Chinese News
- Packet
- Queenswood Newsliner
- Riverviews
- The Spectrum
- Stittsville News
- Stittsville Weekend Signal
- Vistas
- West Carleton Review
- Weekly Journal

=== Other publications ===
- Apartment613
- Hill Times
- iPolitics
- Ottawa Business Journal
- The Ottawan

== Other media ==
- CPAC
- Parliament Hill offices of the Canadian Broadcasting Corporation
- Canadian Broadcasting Corporation corporate headquarters
- Head office of Canadian Geographic
- rabble.ca
