= CBC Ottawa =

CBC Ottawa refers to:

- CBO-FM, CBC Radio One on 91.5 FM
- CBOQ-FM, CBC Radio 2 on 103.3 FM
- CBOT-DT, CBC Television on channel 4

SRC Ottawa refers to:

- CBOF-FM, Première Chaîne on 90.7 FM
- CBOX-FM, Espace musique on 102.5 FM
- CBOFT-DT, Ici Radio-Canada Télé on channel 9

See also:

- CBC Ottawa Production Centre, the headquarters of the Canadian Broadcasting Corporation
