= CBOX-FM =

Ici Musique station in Ottawa, Ontario, Canada

Coordinates: 45.4212°N 75.6998°W

- Ottawa, Ontario; Canada
- Broadcast area: National Capital Region
- Frequency: 102.5 MHz

Programming
- Format: Adult Album Alternative/Public Music
- Network: Ici Musique

Ownership
- Owner: Société Radio-Canada
- Sister stations: CBOF-FM, CBOQ-FM, CBO-FM, CBOT-DT, CBOFT-DT

History
- First air date: September 12, 1974
- Former call signs: CBOF-FM (1974–1991)
- Call sign meaning: Canadian Broadcasting Corporation Ottawa X

Technical information
- Class: C1
- ERP: 84,000 watts
- HAAT: 323 metres (1,060 ft)

Links
- Website: ICI Musique

CBOX-FM (102.5 MHz) is a non-commercial French-language radio station. It broadcasts the Société Radio-Canada's Ici Musique network in Ottawa, Ontario. CBOX's studios are located in the CBC Ottawa Broadcast Centre on Queen Street (across from the O-Train Line 1 light rail station) in Downtown Ottawa, while its transmitter is located in Camp Fortune, Quebec. CBOX-FM plays a variety of music, including adult album alternative (AAA), classical music and jazz.

This station signed on for the first time on September 12, 1974, the same day Radio-Canada launched a separate FM service. It was formerly known as CBOF-FM until 1991, when sister station AM 1250 CBOF switched to the FM dial at 90.7 MHz.

For a time, CBOX-FM aired one local programme on weekday mornings, Beau temps, mauvais temps, hosted by Jhade Montpetit. This program, which was heard on every station belonging to the Ici Musique network, using local or regional hosts, was cancelled in June 2014, due to cuts to the 2014-2015 CBC/Radio-Canada budget.
