= Ken Rockburn =

Canadian radio and television journalist and host

Ken Rockburn (born 1947) is a Canadian radio and television journalist and host. He is most noted for his associations with the Canadian Cable Public Affairs Channel (CPAC), the Canadian Broadcasting Corporation and CHEZ-FM radio.

== Career history ==
From the late 1970s until the early 1990s Rockburn served as news director at Ottawa radio station CHEZ-FM. As news director, he won three national radio awards from ACTRA. He also hosted a two-hour program on arts and current affairs called Medium Rare, which was widely syndicated across Canada. Rockburn's book from this period, Medium Rare: Jamming With Culture was published in 1995.

During 1994 to 1997, Rockburn hosted Rockburn and Company on CBC's Ottawa television station CBOT. Contemporaneously, as of 1996, on Ottawa's CBC Radio One station CBO-FM, Rockburn hosted All in a Day. Rockburn's tenure on the show continued until 2001, during which the program was consistently ranked number one in its market.

Rockburn joined CPAC in 2001, and developed two shows: Rockburn Presents and Talk Politics. Rockburn: The CPAC Interviews was published in 2007. Rockburn retired from CPAC in 2008.

In 2015, Rockburn published the book We Are as the Times Are, a history of Le Hibou Coffee House.
