= Ian Black (meteorologist) =

Canadian meteorologist

Ian Black (born January 12, 1962) retired June 16, 2022, after a career as a meteorologist for CBOT, the CBC outlet in Ottawa.

Black joined the local evening news broadcast along with anchor Peter Van Dusen in 1989. He is a certified broadcaster with the Canadian Meteorological and Oceanographic Society, serving as the only CMOS-certified broadcaster in Ottawa and one of only a few to perform local forecasting duties.

== Past work ==
In addition to providing extensive forecasting on CBC News: Ottawa at Six, Black gave regular updates on the CBO-FM program All in a Day. His televised segments included a "Weather Watchers' Club" in which volunteers from communities surrounding Ottawa submitted current temperatures and conditions, which are superimposed on a map. In 2007, Black visited local elementary schools to talk to children about weather and answer their questions, with highlights appearing on his daily broadcasts.

== "Locked Out Live" ==
During a CBC lockout in 2005, radio personality Alan Neal hosted a half-hour segment outside CBC studios titled "Locked Out Live". Ian Black provided a mock forecast, with lines such as "a lot of hot air on Parliament Hill".
