= CBOF-FM =

Radio station in Ottawa, Ontario, Canada

- Ottawa, Ontario; Canada
- Broadcast area: National Capital Region, Eastern Ontario, Outaouais
- Frequency: 90.7 MHz

Programming
- Format: News/Talk
- Network: Ici Radio-Canada Première

Ownership
- Owner: Canadian Broadcasting Corporation
- Sister stations: CBO-FM, CBOQ-FM, CBOX-FM, CBOT-DT, CBOFT-DT

History
- First air date: August 1, 1964
- Former frequencies: 1250 kHz (AM) (1964–1991)
- Call sign meaning: Canadian Broadcasting Corporation Ottawa French

Technical information
- Class: C1
- ERP: 84,000 watts
- HAAT: 323 metres (1,060 ft)

Links
- Website: Ici Radio-Canada Première

CBOF-FM (90.7 MHz) is a non-commercial radio station located in Ottawa, Ontario, Canada. It airs a French language news/talk format, much of which comes from the Ici Radio-Canada Première network. The studios and offices are located at the CBC Ottawa Broadcast Centre on Queen Street (across from the O-Train Line 1 light rail station) in Downtown Ottawa.

Owned and operated by the Canadian Broadcasting Corporation (French: Société Radio-Canada), CBOF-FM has an effective radiated power (ERP) of 84,000 watts as a class C1 station, using an omnidirectional antenna located off Chemin Dunlop in Camp Fortune, Quebec.

== Programming ==
The station's current local programs are Les matins d'ici, heard weekday mornings from 5:30 a.m. to 9 a.m., and Sur le vif airing on weekday afternoons, 3 p.m. to 6 p.m. The early morning program from 5 a.m. to 5:30 a.m., Info matin, originates from CBF-FM Montreal and is also heard in Quebec City. CBOF-FM's Saturday morning local program is Les malins, heard from 7:00 a.m. to 11 a.m.

== History ==
The station signed on in 1964 as CBOF. It was originally on the AM band at 1250 kHz, with 10,000 watts day and night. Before then, Radio-Canada relied on privately owned AM 970 CKCH in nearby Hull, Quebec, as well as the 50,000-watt signal of Montreal's AM 690 CBF, to serve Ottawa's francophones.

On January 15, 1975 the Canadian Radio-television and Telecommunications Commission (CRTC) approved the CBC's application to increase CBOF's signal from 10,000 watts to 50,000 watts day and night at 1250 kHz. In the 1980s, the CBC made the decision to begin moving many of its English and French-language AM stations to the FM dial.

The CRTC approved the CBC's application to convert CBOF from the AM band to the FM band, on November 9, 1989. CBOF moved to its current frequency on 90.7 MHz on January 7, 1991 as CBOF-FM. After a period of simulcasting on both AM and FM, the AM transmitter was shut down. Its sister station on 102.5, on the Radio-Canada Musique network, which used the CBOF-FM call sign before that date, is now known as CBOX-FM.

CBOF-FM, like all Première network stations but unlike most FM stations, broadcasts in mono. While still on the AM dial, CBOF experimented with AM stereo broadcasts between 1984 and 1987, testing all four AM stereo systems (C-QUAM, Kahn-Hazeltine, Harris and Magnavox) proposed at the time.

== Transmitters ==
Rebroadcasters of CBOF-FM
| City of licence | Identifier | Frequency | Power | RECNet | CRTC Decision | Notes |
|---|---|---|---|---|---|---|
| Maniwaki, Quebec | CBOF-FM-1 | 94.3 FM | 210 watts | Query | | 46°22′49.08″N 75°58′14.88″W |
| Rolphton | CBOF-FM-4 | 98.5 FM | 129 watts | Query | | 46°10′18.84″N 77°42′0″W |
| Cornwall | CBOF-FM-6 | 98.1 FM | 3,000 watts | Query | | 45°2′25.08″N 74°47′43.08″W |
| Brockville | CBOF-FM-7 | 102.1 FM | 1,495 vertical/1,451 horizontal watts | Query | | 44°38′25.08″N 75°37′6.96″W |
| L'Isle-aux-Allumettes, Quebec/Pembroke | CBOF-FM-9 | 88.7 FM | 2,300 watts | Query | | 45°55′28.92″N 77°4′22.08″W |

- The two AM repeaters in Rolphton, Ontario and Maniwaki, Quebec were the last two remaining CBOF repeaters that operated on the AM band. The AM transmitters of CBOF-1 990 and CBOF-4 1400 were converted to the FM band. On March 17, 2022, the CBC submitted an application to move CBOF-1 990 to 94.3 MHz. The CRTC approved the CBC's applications to move both CBOF-1 and CBOM Maniwaki to the FM band on June 1, 2022.
- On September 20, 2022, the CBC submitted an application to convert CBOF-4 1400 to 98.5 MHz which was approved on November 28, 2022.

On January 27, 2025, the CRTC approved the CBC's application to change the following technichal information for CBOF-FM-9 at 88.7 MHz in L’Isle-aux-Allumettes (Chapeau, Quebec) by changing the class of the transmitter from A to C1, increasing the maximum effective radiated power (ERP) from 2,300 to 75,148 watts, increasing the average ERP from 2,300 to 30,124 watts, replacing the existing circular non-directional antenna with a new elliptical directional antenna and increasing the effective height of the antenna above average terrain (EHAAT) from 91.5 to 93.9 metres, and to relocate the transmitter to another site in Pembroke, Ontario and will remain on 88.7 MHz.

=== Former repeaters ===
Former CBOF repeaters that have been silent since the 1980s and 1990s:

- Petawawa - CBOF-2 1240 AM
- Deep River - CBOF-3 730 AM
- Mattawa - CBOF-5 1090 AM - This was a former repeater of CBOF Ottawa which still remains on the air (in 2024 at 1090 kHz) as CBON-12, a repeater of CBON-FM Sudbury
- Renfrew - CBOF-FM-8 98.7 - This was a former FM repeater in Renfrew, Ontario that was deleted when CBOF-FM signed on in Ottawa in the early 1990s. The 98.7 FM frequency is now currently occupied by CJHR-FM in Renfrew, while the two former AM frequencies that were used by CBOF as repeaters in Petawawa and Deep River were never reactivated for any other future broadcasting.
