= CBOQ-FM =

CBC Music station in Ottawa, Ontario, Canada

Coordinates: 45.42112°N 75.7000°W

- Ottawa, Ontario; Canada
- Broadcast area: National Capital Region
- Frequency: 103.3 MHz

Programming
- Format: Adult contemporary/Public music
- Network: CBC Music

Ownership
- Owner: Canadian Broadcasting Corporation
- Sister stations: CBOF-FM, CBO-FM, CBOX-FM, CBOT-DT, CBOFT-DT

History
- First air date: February 27, 1948
- Call sign meaning: Canadian Broadcasting Corporation Ottawa Q

Technical information
- Class: C1
- ERP: 84 kW
- HAAT: 323 metres (1,060 ft)

Links
- Webcast: Windows Media stream (network feed)
- Website: CBC Ottawa

CBOQ-FM is a Canadian radio station. It broadcasts the Canadian Broadcasting Corporation's CBC Music network at 103.3 FM in Ottawa, Ontario. CBOQ's studios are located in the CBC Ottawa Broadcast Centre on Queen Street (across from the O-Train Line 1 light rail station) in Downtown Ottawa, while its transmitter is located in Camp Fortune, Quebec.

The station was launched on February 27, 1948 as CBO-FM. It adopted its current callsign in 1991, when its AM sister station CBO moved to the FM band. It has no rebroadcasters.
