= CBC Ottawa Production Centre =

Canadian Broadcasting Corporation headquarters

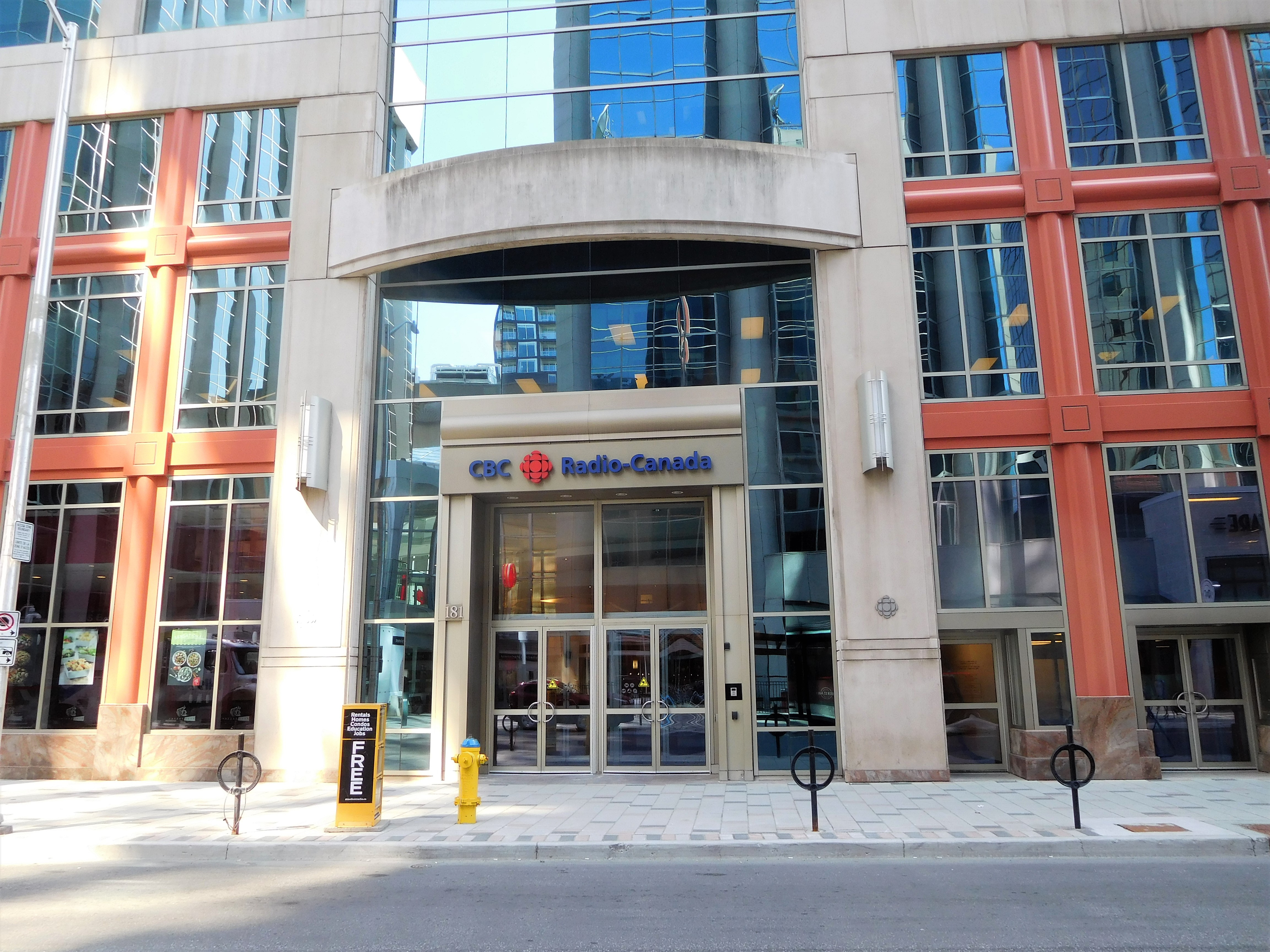
- Production Centre in 2019
- Interactive map of the CBC Ottawa Production Centre area

General information
- Status: Completed
- Type: Headquarters; Production centre
- Location: 181 Queen Street, Ottawa, Ontario, Canada
- Coordinates: 45.420418°N 75.701541°W
- Current tenants: Canadian Broadcasting Corporation
- Opened: 2004
- Owner: Morguard Investments (2004–2024); Public Services and Procurement Canada (2024–present)

Technical details
- Floor count: 11

Website
- cbc.radio-canada.ca/en/services/facilities

The CBC Ottawa Production Centre is an office and studio complex that serves as the headquarters of the Canadian Broadcasting Corporation. It is located on Queen Street in the downtown core of Ottawa, Ontario, Canada. The building hosts the originating studios for both the CBC's English-language and French-language operations in the National Capital Region. The building was opened in 2004, and contains approximately 37,700 square metres (405,799 sq ft) of office space.

== Design and construction ==
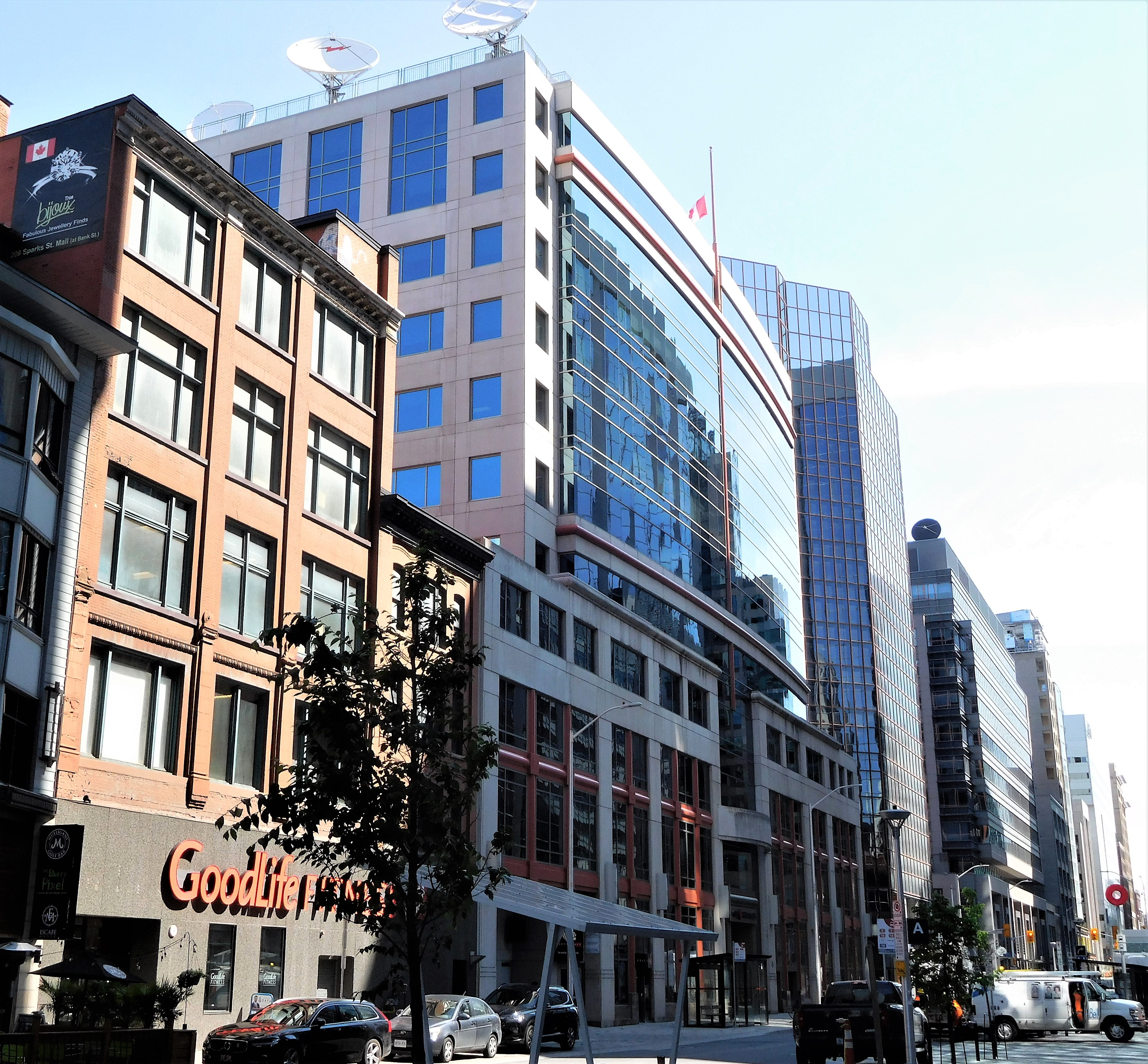
View from Queen Street

The building that houses the Ottawa Production Centre was built by Morguard Investments. Not all of it is leased by the CBC, with the top floors occupied by the House of Commons administration (Information Services). It is located at 181 Queen Street, between Bank Street and O'Connor Street (across from the Confederation Line light rail station) in the city's downtown core. The rear of the building backs out on the Sparks Street pedestrian mall. The site had been vacant for several years and had previously been home to a Woolworth's department store.

Several of the studios and the newsroom are located at ground level on Sparks Street, allowing the public to observe from outside through 4-metre (13 ft) high windows. Eight different CBC News services, consisting of 200 editorial staff in the National Capital Region, operate in both English and French out of the main newsroom to produce content for radio, television and the internet.

The main design feature of the Production Centre is that it appears as a typical multi-storey office building on the Queen Street frontage, whereas the Sparks Street frontage is consistent with the low-rise development on the pedestrian mall. Given the significant terracing of the building's Sparks Street façade above the fourth floor and the grade differential between Queen Street and Sparks Street, the building is 12 storeys on Queen Street, but appears to be only four storeys in height from ground level on Sparks Street.

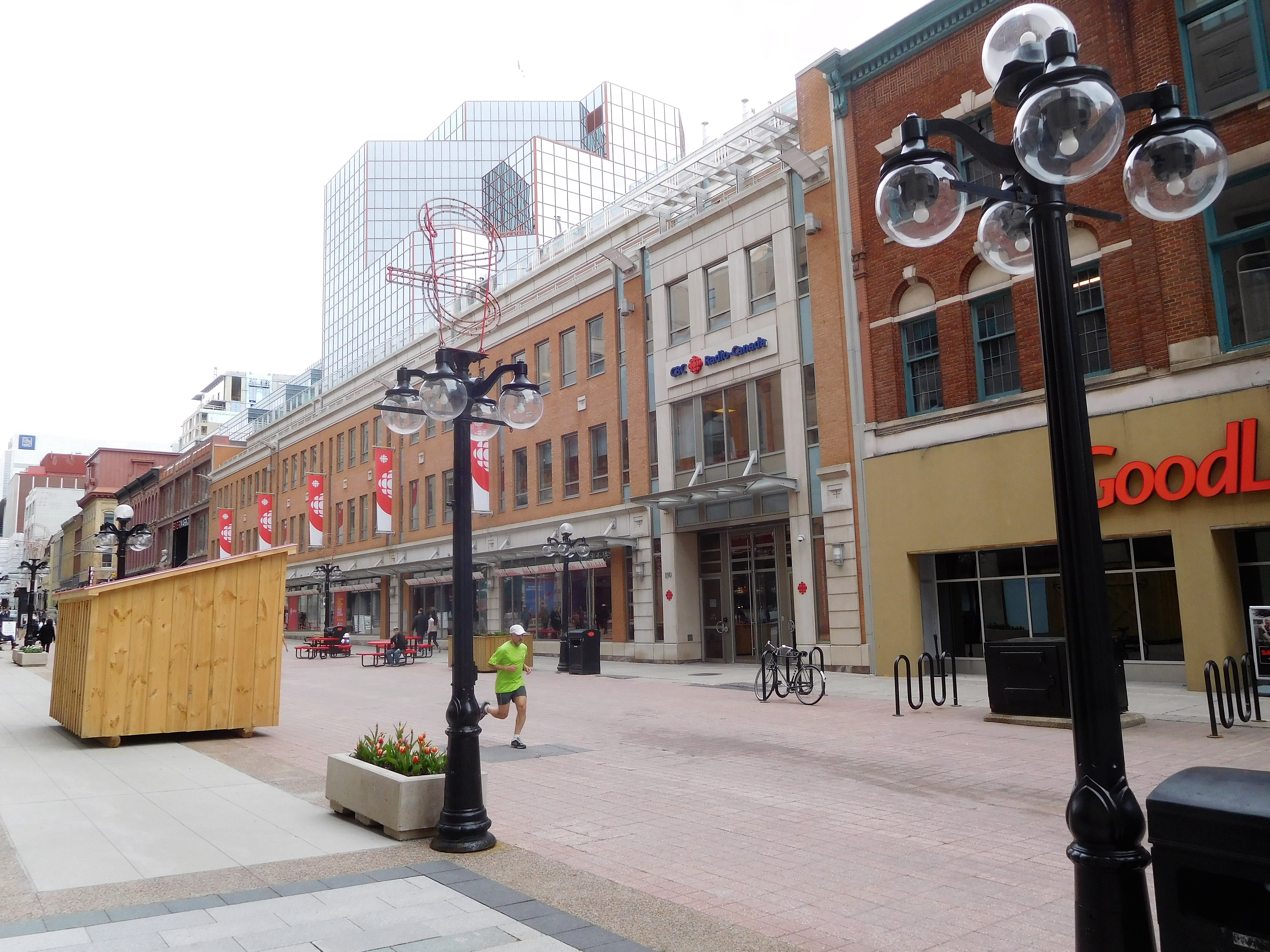
View from Sparks Street

Although the building was designed to revitalize Sparks Street, critic Rhys Phillips described the building as "just another low-cost, banal building." Visitors and non-CBC employees working on the building's upper floors must access the building from Queen Street, thus directing pedestrians away from the pedestrian mall. A pathway linking the Queen Street lobby to Sparks Street was cut from the original design to make room for a larger newsroom. Councillor Diane Holmes called the building "the biggest disappointment" and "a whole block of deadness."

In March 2024, it was announced that Morguard Corporation sold the building to Public Services and Procurement Canada for CA$125.3 million.

== CBC services based in the building ==
- Radio
  - CBO-FM, CBC Radio One
  - CBOF-FM, Ici Radio-Canada Première
  - CBOQ-FM, CBC Music
  - CBOX-FM, Ici Musique
- Television
  - CBOFT-DT, Ici Radio-Canada Télé
  - CBOT-DT, CBC Television
  - Studios for CBC Television, CBC News Network and Ici Radio-Canada Télé political programming, including Power & Politics, Rosemary Barton Live and Les Coulisses du pouvoir

== Former CBC offices and studios in Ottawa ==
Previously, the CBC operated out of various buildings throughout the city. The radio division occupied the seventh floor of the Château Laurier hotel, while the television division operated out of the Graham Spry Building in the Westboro neighbourhood. The CBC's Parliamentary Bureau operated out of the National Press Building on Wellington Street and the Booth Building on Sparks Street. The CBC head office previously occupied 1500 Bronson Avenue in Ottawa south, but budgetary cutbacks in the 1980s and 1990s led to the sale of that building and to a drastic downsizing of the head office staff. Prior to the opening of the Production Centre, the remaining head office staff shared space with the television operations in the Westboro building.

== See also ==
- Canadian Broadcasting Centre
- CBC Ottawa
