= CBOQ =

CBOQ may be short for:

- Canadian Baptists of Ontario and Quebec
- CBOQ-FM a Ottawa radio station
