= Ontario Today =

- Running time: 12:00 pm–1:00 pm
- Country of origin: Canada
- Language: English
- Home station: CBC Radio One
- Hosted by: Amanda Pfeffer
- Recording studio: CBC Ottawa Broadcast Centre
- Website: cbc.ca/ontariotoday

Ontario Today is a Canadian talk radio program on CBC Radio One. The program is broadcast live from the studios of CBO-FM in the CBC Ottawa Broadcast Centre weekdays, and it is carried on all CBC Radio One transmitters in Ontario. The one-hour program typically features one or more guests to discuss a single news or current affairs based subject, inviting Ontario Today callers to weigh-in on the question of the day.

Currently hosted by Amanda Pfeffer, the program was previously hosted by Alan Neal from 2003 to 2006, and by Rita Celli from 2006 to 2023. Ontario Today has won a number of journalism awards, including most recently, Gracie Award by the Alliance for Women in Media Foundation in the spring of 2025. Ontario Today launched in 1997 as a province-wide two-hour programme produced out of CBC Ottawa, replacing Radio Noon, which was the umbrella name of five different midday programmes by CBC Radio stations in Toronto, Ottawa, Windsor, Sudbury, and Thunder Bay. Radio Noon, had consisted of an hour from noon to one that was locally produced while the second hour was a province-wide phone-in. Radio Noon continues to be the name of the similar noon-hour programs on CBC Radio One's stations in Manitoba, Quebec and Newfoundland and Labrador.

== See also ==
- CBC Radio One local programming
