= Mix FM (Ottawa) =

Unlicensed radio station in Ottawa, Ontario, Canada

- Ottawa, Ontario; Canada
- Frequency: 91.9 MHz
- Branding: 91.9 Mix FM

Programming
- Format: Top 40 and Dance

History
- First air date: 2009
- Last air date: January 15, 2010
- Former call signs: Unofficial: CTOM-FM (before Dec 6, 2009), CKLI-FM
- Former frequencies: 107.7 MHz; 99.9 MHz; 106.5 MHz; 92.7 MHz

Technical information
- Transmitter coordinates: 45.297253°N 75.58027°W

Mix FM was an unlicensed radio station in Ottawa, Ontario, Canada. The station broadcast as a pirate radio station on several frequencies, most notably on 91.9 FM. The station was "forced off the air" soon after midnight on December 14, 2009; however, the station later signed back on the air 10 days later. The broadcast of Mix FM was forcibly shut down by Industry Canada on January 15, 2010, although the station continues to operate a podcast stream online. The operator of the station was subsequently found guilty of violating the Radiocommunication Act.

== Station facility ==
The radio studio was located at a hotel/restaurant/strip club, owned by the operator's father, in South Gloucester. The station used to broadcast 24 hours a day, with songs selected by computer when not operated manually.

All of the station's equipment was set up by a teenager who claimed it was done without the knowledge of his father. To cover the $80,000 cost to set up the equipment, the teenager chose to use an inheritance. According to the operator, Mix FM could be heard 60 kilometers (40 miles) away.

== Station history ==
=== Cease and desist orders ===
==== First cease and desist ====
Being an unlicensed broadcast undertaking, Mix FM was an illegal pirate radio station. Industry Canada warned the station that its broadcasts were illegal since they had not applied for a radio operators license. Industry Canada further encouraged the teen to operate a web stream or podcast. The station voluntarily ceased operation but reportedly "simply waited a few hours and started broadcasting again" the following day.

Industry Canada reported that if the station continued operating without proper authority, it could consider taking "enforcement measures." However, Industry Canada spokesperson Michel Cimpaye said that "the Department is not in a position at this time to comment on the next steps or potential outcomes."

==== Interference ====
Interference with CBO-FM was subsequently demonstrated in a CBOT-TV news report, demonstrating how Mix FM was causing second-adjacent-channel interference with the 91.5 FM frequency.

==== Second cease and desist ====
On December 10, 2009, Mix FM was served with a second cease and desist letter by Industry Canada asking for the immediate shutdown of the broadcast. Two Capital Region radio stations sent engineers to test Mix FM's radio tower for emitted radiation and filed complaints with Industry Canada after determining the tower was "running hot".

=== Changing channel frequency ===
The station operated over an array of frequencies, including 92.7, 99.9, 106.5 and 107.7 FM before settling on the 91.9 frequency.

=== First shutdown of broadcast ===
On December 14, 2009, Mix FM was shut down and the operator issued an apology on his website.

=== Relaunch of station ===
Mix FM had announced on-air that the station anticipated to be licensed by Industry Canada within two weeks of the shutdown of its broadcast. After turning off their FM broadcast, Mix FM began to podcast broadcasts and provided a video tour of their facilities. After 10 days of having its broadcast off-air, Mix FM once again began broadcasting on 91.9 FM on December 24, 2009.

=== Second shutdown of broadcast ===
On January 7, 2010 Industry Canada issued a statement to the Ottawa Citizen stating that it was evaluating its options and no course of action in regards to the operation of an unauthorized broadcast had been decided. On January 15, 2010 at 9:00 a.m., with a judge-appointed order and with the help of the Royal Canadian Mounted Police, Industry Canada took action to shut down the broadcast of Mix FM by executing a search warrant. Police cut power to the hotel at 11:52 a.m. and 91.9 went silent. At 12:07 p.m., it turned to static. As the equipment was being seized, the teenager uttered a death threat to an Industry Canada employee.

The teenager made a statement to the Ottawa Citizen in which he stated that "[he] will be back on [the air]" as soon as he could replace the seized equipment. In an interview with the Cornwall Free News, he expected that there would be a hearing within 90 days to have his equipment returned.

Further, he "admitted to ordering another transmitter, tower, and equipment," although there are conflicting reports as to whether it is a 3,000-watt or a 4,000-watt transmitter with a mono signal. After the shutdown of the broadcast station, Mix FM shifted back to podcasting. In the first podcast, he claimed that Industry Canada did not seize a working homemade 30-watt transmitter which was unlabeled.

== Criminal trial and verdict ==
On March 31, 2011, the operator of the pirate radio station appeared in court as a young offender for the charge of violating the Radiocommunication Act. Further, he faced four charges of criminal harassment and three counts of uttering threats against announcers Ryan Lindsay of 89.9 CIHT-FM, John Mielke of 93.9 CKKL-FM his industry website Milkman Unlimited, and Industry Canada employee Mylene Quesnel, and was also charged with assaulting a police officer and obstruction of justice. The youth was represented by Lawrence Greenspon.

At trial, Lindsay testified that he had received threats on January 15, 2010, after playing the same songs as Mix FM had. Quesnel testified that the teenager had been screaming angrily when Industry Canada forcefully shut down the station. An unidentified employee of CFRA was also threatened.

The teenager admitted that, after calling Lindsay fifty times over the course of four months, the teenager then said he would kill Lindsay. In court, the teenager said he hadn't been serious, even though he had shown up at the station 30 minutes later, driven there by his father. The teenager also admitted to telling a police officer that the Industry Canada investigator would be "better off dead". He denied posting a video asking if he should "shoot" Mielke for reporting allegedly suicidal online messages to police; the teen said he had used the word "sue" rather than "shoot", and that the police accusing him of using "shoot" was the reason that he was so angry that police handcuffed him to a paramedic backboard to get him to the hospital.

Judge Donald Ebbs ruled on April 7, 2011, that the teenager was guilty on three counts of uttering threats and two counts of criminal harassment, as well as the Radiocommunication Act charge. The boy was acquitted of two counts of criminally harassing Ryan Lindsay because Lindsay was never afraid of him. He was also acquitted of assaulting an Ottawa Police Officer and obstructing an RCMP officer. Sentencing for the youth was scheduled for June 24, 2011; however, it was delayed until September 1, 2011. At sentencing, the youth was given a conditional discharge, 15 months of probation and 60 hours of community service.
