= The Things We See =

- Written by: Alan Jarvis
- Presented by: Alan Jarvis
- Country of origin: Canada
- Original language: English
- No. of seasons: 1
- No. of episodes: 12

Production
- Producer: Marion Dunn
- Production location: Ottawa
- Running time: 30 minutes

Original release
- Network: CBC Television
- Release: 2 July – 24 September 1957

The Things We See is a Canadian children's television program about the arts which aired on CBC Television from July to September 1957.

== Premise ==
Alan Jarvis, the National Gallery of Canada's director, hosted this program which encouraged viewers to examine ordinary objects for certain patterns, featuring items from the National Gallery. It was named for Jarvis' 1947 book The Things We See – Indoors and Out.

Special postcards were sold to viewers to support the 11th episode's theme on colour, given that the CBC was limited to black-and-white broadcasts at that time.

== Scheduling ==
12 episodes of this half-hour program were broadcast on Tuesdays 5:00 p.m. from 2 July to 24 September 1957.
