= Rita Celli =

Canadian radio journalist (born 1969)

Rita Celli (born 1969 in Sudbury, Ontario) is a Canadian radio journalist, who was the host of Ontario Today on CBC Radio One's stations in Ontario from 2006 to 2023.

Born and raised in Sudbury, Ontario, she graduated from Carleton University's journalism program in 1991. Prior to Ontario Today, she held a number of positions at CBC on both radio and television, including anchor of CBOT-DT's supper-hour newscast.

In 2000, she and a team of CBC journalists won an investigative award from the Canadian Association of Journalists. In 2014, Celli was awarded the Michener-Deacon Fellowship for Investigative Journalism.
