= CJHR-FM =

Community radio station in Renfrew, Ontario

Coordinates: 45°25′51″N 76°38′05″W

- Renfrew, Ontario; Canada
- Frequency: 98.7 MHz

Ownership
- Owner: Valley Heritage Radio

History
- First air date: December 11, 2006, with on-air testing

Technical information
- Class: B
- ERP: 13,000 watts average 20,000 watts peak
- HAAT: 105.3 metres (345 ft)

Links
- Website: valleyheritageradio.ca

CJHR-FM is a Canadian radio station broadcasting at 98.7 FM, from its station office just south of Renfrew, Ontario on the Burnstown Road with a community radio format.

== History ==
On September 8, 2004, V.R. Garbutt, on behalf of a not for profit corporation to be incorporated (Valley Heritage Radio) received an approved licensed from the Canadian Radio-television and Telecommunications Commission (CRTC) to operate an English-language FM Type B community radio station in the Town of Renfrew area. The proposed station would operate at 98.7 MHz with an effective radiated power of 14,000 watts (maximum of 27,000 watts). Antenna height would be 106.3 metres. On October 27, 2006, CJHR was authorized to decrease effective radiated power from 14,000 watts (27,000 maximum) to 13,000 watts (20,000 maximum), and decrease antenna height from 106.3 metres to 105.3 metres. There would also be a change in the proposed antenna site.

CJHR began on-air testing at 98.7 MHz on December 11, 2006, and officially signed on on January 15, 2007. The first song ever played on CJHR-FM was Vic Garbutt's Waltz, by Calvin Vollrath.

== Notes ==
The 98.7 frequency was once occupied by CBOF-FM-8 in the Town of Renfrew area (not to be confused with the larger County of Renfrew), but was deleted in the early 1990s after the former CBOF on the AM band moved to 90.7 FM in Ottawa.

Local Town of Renfrew and area radio listeners welcomed the return of local radio to their area after they had lost their created in 1974 CKOB AM 1400 radio station in 1990 which was then converted into a radio rebroadcaster, a new status which endured until 1996.
