= CBO-FM =

CBC Radio One station in Ontario, Canada

- Ottawa, Ontario; Canada
- Broadcast area: National Capital Region, Eastern Ontario, Western Quebec, Upstate New York
- Frequency: 91.5 MHz

Programming
- Format: News/Talk
- Network: CBC Radio One

Ownership
- Owner: Canadian Broadcasting Corporation
- Sister stations: CBOF-FM, CBOQ-FM, CBOX-FM, CBOT-DT, CBOFT-DT

History
- First air date: 27 February 1924
- Former call signs: CKCH (1924); CNRO (1924–1933); CRCO (1933–1937); CBO (1937–1991)
- Former frequencies: 690 kHz (AM) (1924–1927, 1927–1929); 840 kHz (1927); 600 kHz (1929–1941); 910 kHz (1941–1977); 920 kHz (1977–1991)
- Call sign meaning: Canadian Broadcasting Corporation Ottawa

Technical information
- Class: C1
- ERP: 84,000 watts
- HAAT: 323 metres (1,060 ft)

Links
- Website: CBC Ottawa

CBO-FM is a Canadian radio station. It is the CBC Radio One station in Ottawa, Ontario, airing at 91.5 FM, and serves much of Eastern Ontario through a network of relay transmitters. CBO's Ottawa-area transmitter is located in Camp Fortune, Quebec, while its studios are located in the CBC Ottawa Broadcast Centre on Queen Street (across from the O-Train Line 1 light rail station) in Downtown Ottawa.

== History ==
CNRO was launched on February 27, 1924, as CKCH a Canadian National Railway radio network station, and adopted the CNRO call sign on July 16, 1924, in order to indicate its network affiliation. The station was the first to broadcast the time signal from the Dominion Observatory in Ottawa, doing so daily at 9 p.m. It operated on 690 AM and later switched to 600. In 1933, the station was taken over by the CBC's predecessor, the Canadian Radio Broadcasting Commission and became CRCO on 880 kHz. The call sign changed to CBO in 1937 when ownership was transferred to the CBC. Later frequency changes to 910 in 1941 and to 920 in 1977 (the latter accompanied by a power boost to 50,000 watts) were followed by a move to 91.5 FM in 1991. The call sign of the existing CBO-FM facility (103.3, part of the CBC Stereo network) was then changed to CBOQ-FM. From 1924, the station's studios were located on the sixth floor of the Château Laurier Hotel in downtown Ottawa, a legacy of its origins with the Canadian National Railway which had also owned the hotel. In 2004, the station left the Château Laurier, closing the oldest operating radio studios in Canada, and moved to the new CBC Ottawa Broadcast Centre on Sparks Street as part of a consolidation of various Ottawa CBC facilities.

== Local programming ==
The station's local programs are Ottawa Morning, hosted by Rebecca Zandbergen, and All in a Day (hosted by Alan Neal) in the afternoon. However, most of the relay transmitters air the Toronto-originated Ontario Morning in place of Ottawa Morning. Unlike most Radio One stations, which air provincewide morning programs on Saturdays and Sundays, the station also produces its own Saturday morning show, In Town and Out, although it airs Fresh Air, the provincewide weekend morning program for the rest of Ontario, on Sundays.

In addition, CBO-FM produces the regional noon news and talk program Ontario Today, which airs on all CBC Radio One stations in Ontario including Toronto, and the national network program, The House. It also formerly produced Bandwidth, a music show which aired on all Radio One stations in Ontario outside of Toronto until 2014.

== Transmitters ==
Rebroadcasters of CBO-FM
City of licence	Identifier	Frequency	Power	Class	RECNet	CRTC Decision	Notes
Belleville	CBO-FM-1	90.3 FM	14,470 watts	B1	Query	2018-375; 2021-176	44°18′51.12″N 77°12′25.92″W
Brockville	CBOB-FM	91.9 FM	1,080 watts	A	Query	2007-399	44°38′25.08″N 75°37′6.96″W
Cornwall	CBOC-FM	95.5 FM	3,000 watts	A	Query		45°2′25.08″N 74°47′43.08″W
Deep River	CBCD-FM-1	97.9 FM	89 watts	LP	Query	2014-504	46°5′17.88″N 77°29′11.04″W
Kingston	CBCK-FM	107.5 FM	100,000 watts	C1	Query	75-328; 98-42	44°17′21.84″N 76°28′49.08″W
Maniwaki, Quebec	CBOM-FM	93.3 FM	205 watts	A1	Query	2022-141; 86-21	46°22′49.08″N 75°58′14.88″W
Pembroke	CBCD-FM	92.5 FM	100,000 watts	C1	Query	94-932	45°40′53.04″N 77°5′45.96″W
Whitney	CBCW-FM	98.5 FM	162 watts	A1	Query		45°29′17.88″N 78°12′21.96″W

On November 9, 1989, CHEZ-FM Inc. was denied a license to add a new FM transmitter at Carleton Place on 92.3 MHz to rebroadcast the programming of the CBC's English-language AM network CBO.

On July 5, 2010, the CBC applied to change Brockville's CBOB-FM frequency from 106.5 to 91.9 MHz which received CRTC approval on November 10, 2010.

On June 2, 2014, the CBC submitted an application to convert CBLI 1110 to 97.9 MHz. This application was approved on September 30, 2014. The callsign sign CBCD-FM-1 was chosen for the new FM transmitter to replace CBLI.

On June 29, 2018, the CBC submitted an application to add a new Radio One FM transmitter at Belleville. The new transmitter will operate on 104.7 MHz with the proposed callsign CBO-FM-1. The CRTC approved the CBC's application on September 26, 2018. On August 13, 2020, CBO-FM-1 officially signed on.

On March 18, 2021, the CBC had applied to the CRTC to change CBO-FM-1 to 90.3 MHz with a power increase from 8,420 watts to 14,470 watts. The change is due to ongoing interference with WBBS Fulton, New York (near Syracuse). The CBC's application to change CBO-FM-1's frequency to 90.3 MHz was approved by the CRTC on May 18, 2021. CBO-FM-1 Belleville moved to its new frequency at 90.3 FM on November 1, 2021.

On May 24, 2022, the CRTC approved the CBC's application to increase the effective radiated power of CBCD-FM-1 to 89 watts, decrease the effective height of the antenna above average terrain from 9.8 to -56.8 metres.

=== AM rebroadcaster ===
CBOM operating at 710 kHz in Maniwaki, Quebec, is CBO-FM's only rebroadcaster outside Ontario and currently the last remaining AM transmitter to rebroadcast CBO-FM. On March 17, 2022, the CBC submitted an application to move CBOM 710 to 93.3 MHz. The CRTC approved the CBC's applications to move both CBOF-1 and CBOM Maniwaki to the FM band on June 1, 2022.
