= All in a Day (radio show) =

All in a Day is a Canadian radio program, the CBC Radio One regional afternoon program for Eastern Ontario. Produced at the studios of Ottawa's CBO-FM, it airs on all Radio One transmitters in Eastern Ontario and the Outaouais.

The program is currently hosted by Alan Neal. Past hosts have included Fraser Cameron, Brent Bambury, Adrian Harewood and Ken Rockburn. The program airs from 3 to 6 p.m. on CBO's main transmitter in Ottawa, while its rebroadcasters air network programming for the first hour and then join All in a Day at 4 p.m.
