= Sparks Street =

Pedestrian mall in Ottawa, Ontario, Canada

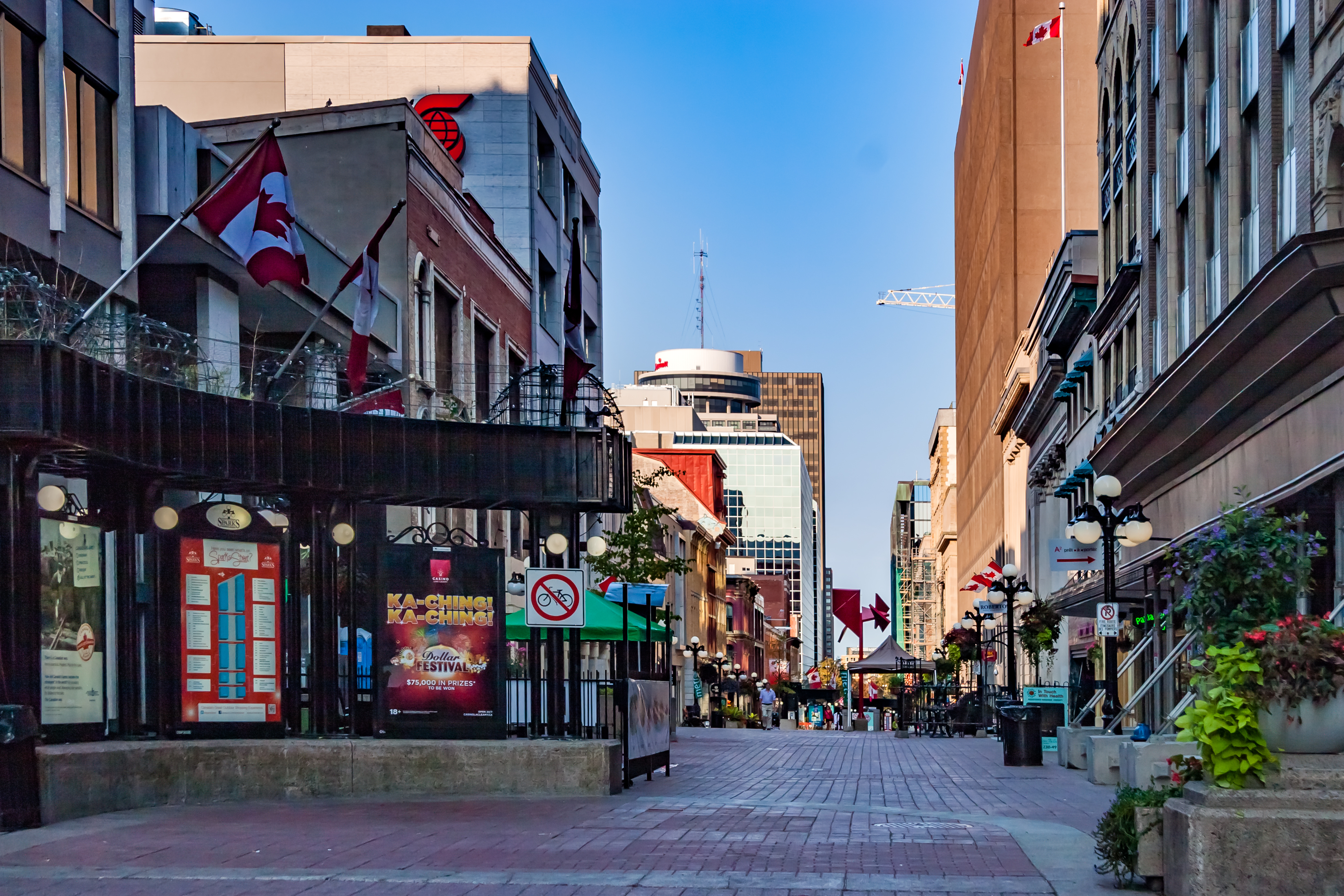
Large sidewalks in Sparks Street

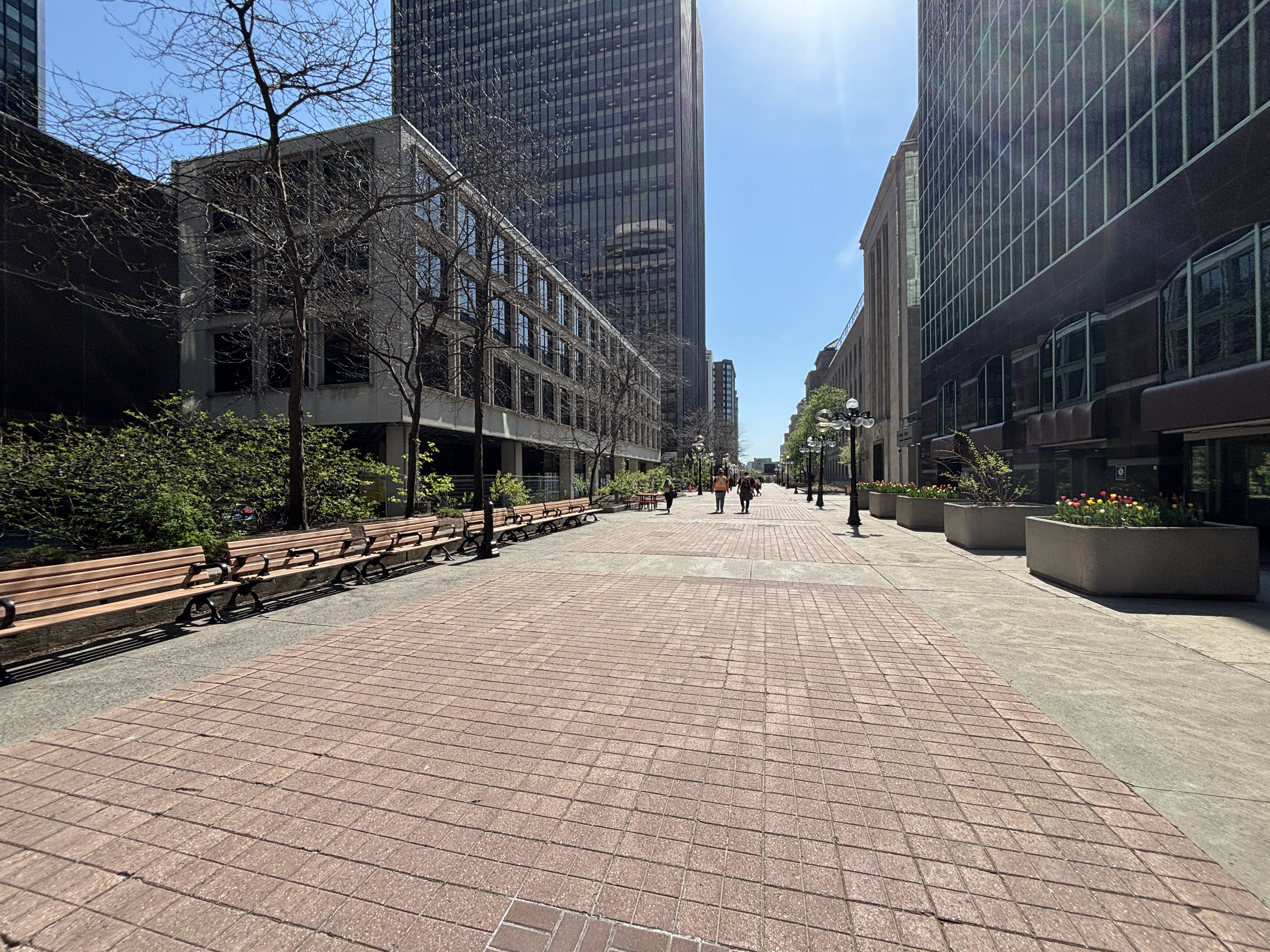
Sparks Street near Kent Street

Sparks Street (French: Rue Sparks) is a pedestrian mall in Ottawa, Ontario, Canada. It was a main street in Ottawa that was converted into an outdoor pedestrian street in 1967, making it the earliest such street or mall in Canada.

Sparks runs from Elgin Street in the east to Bronson Avenue in the west. The Sparks Street Mall, which contains a number of outdoor restaurants and several works of art and fountains, only runs from Elgin to Bank Street. The pedestrian-only portion continues for another two blocks westward. The final two blocks, west of Lyon Street, consist of a regular road, merging into Bronson Avenue heading south.

The mall and most of the buildings on the south side are owned and operated by the National Capital Commission. Buildings on the north side of the mall were expropriated by the Government of Canada in 1973, and are currently operated by Public Works and Government Services Canada.

== History ==
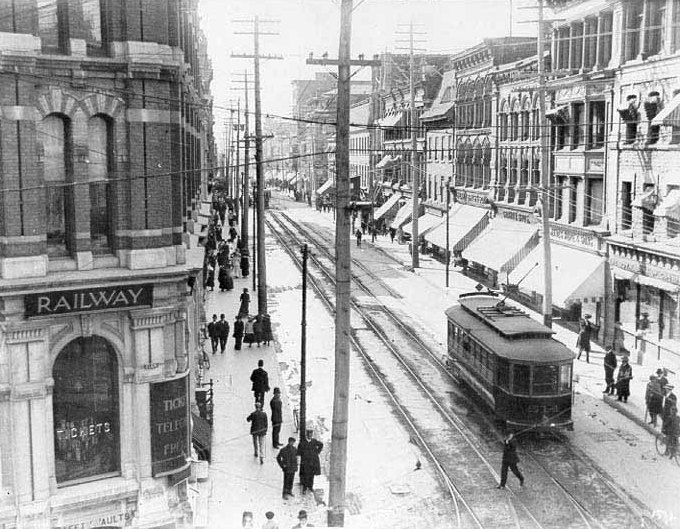
Sparks Street in 1909

Located one block south of Wellington Street (the home of the Parliament of Canada), Sparks Street is one of Ottawa's more historical streets and features a number of heritage buildings. The street is named after Nicholas Sparks, a farmer who, early in the mid-nineteenth century, cut a path through the woods on his holding, which would eventually become this street.

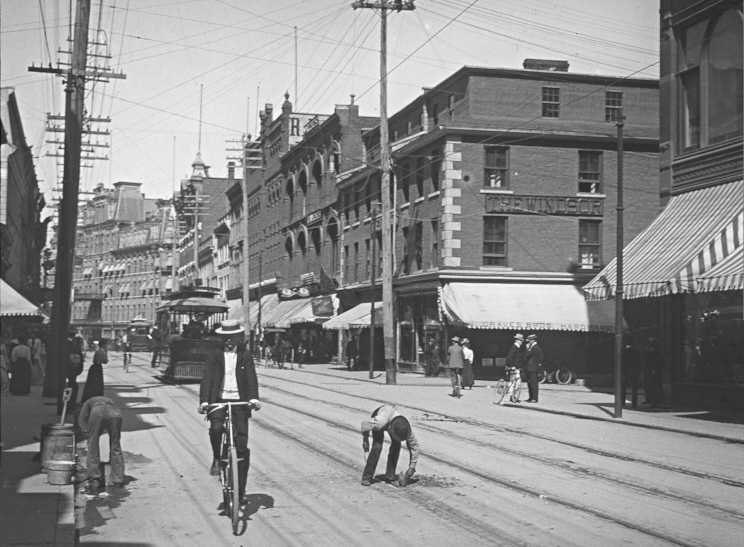
Sparks Street in 1901

When Ottawa was selected as Canada's capital, this area became even more important, as the street became home to a number of government offices and homes for parliamentarians. One of these was Thomas D'Arcy McGee who, in 1868, was assassinated outside his home at the corner of Sparks and Metcalfe. The street also became Ottawa's commercial hub in the late 19th and early 20th centuries, and was home to a number of the city's banks and the lumber companies of the Ottawa Valley, as well as "the best shops, hotels, dining rooms, and theatres.". It once contained the Murphy-Gamble (later Simpson's), Morgan's, C. Ross, and Bryson-Graham's department stores.

The peak of the street was in the early twentieth century, when a number of Beaux-Arts buildings that still stand were erected. At the time, the eastern end of Sparks Street continued across the Rideau Canal on Sappers Bridge. Where the War Memorial and Confederation Square stands today, was the Russell House hotel, and Ottawa's old Post Office. The square was built in the 1930s.

As the city expanded, the downtown area became less centralized and commerce spread to neighbouring streets. Government ministries, requiring larger offices, also went elsewhere. In 1959, the street's streetcar line (Bank Street to Rideau Canal) was closed.

=== Pedestrian mall ===
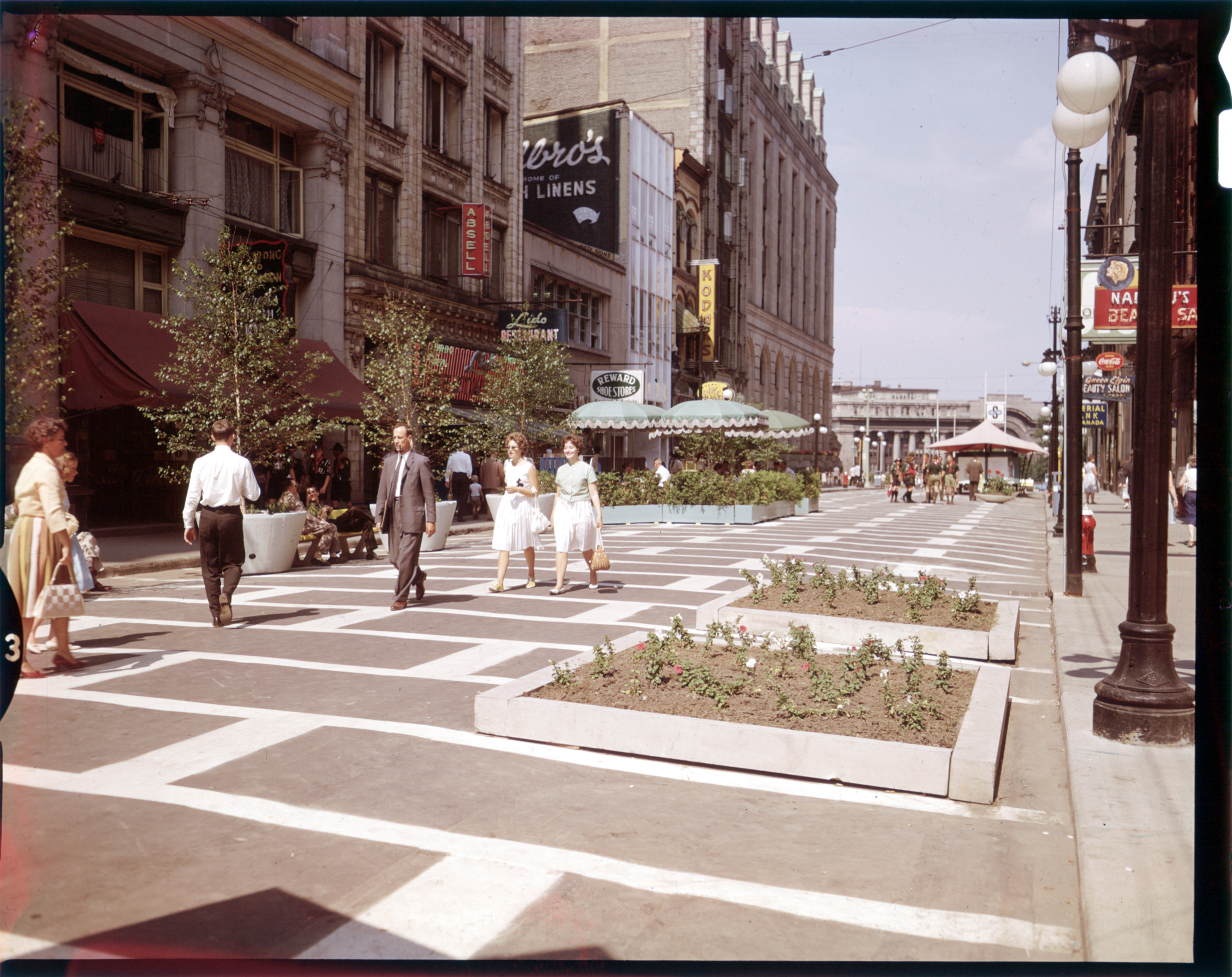
Sparks Street near Elgin Street in 1952

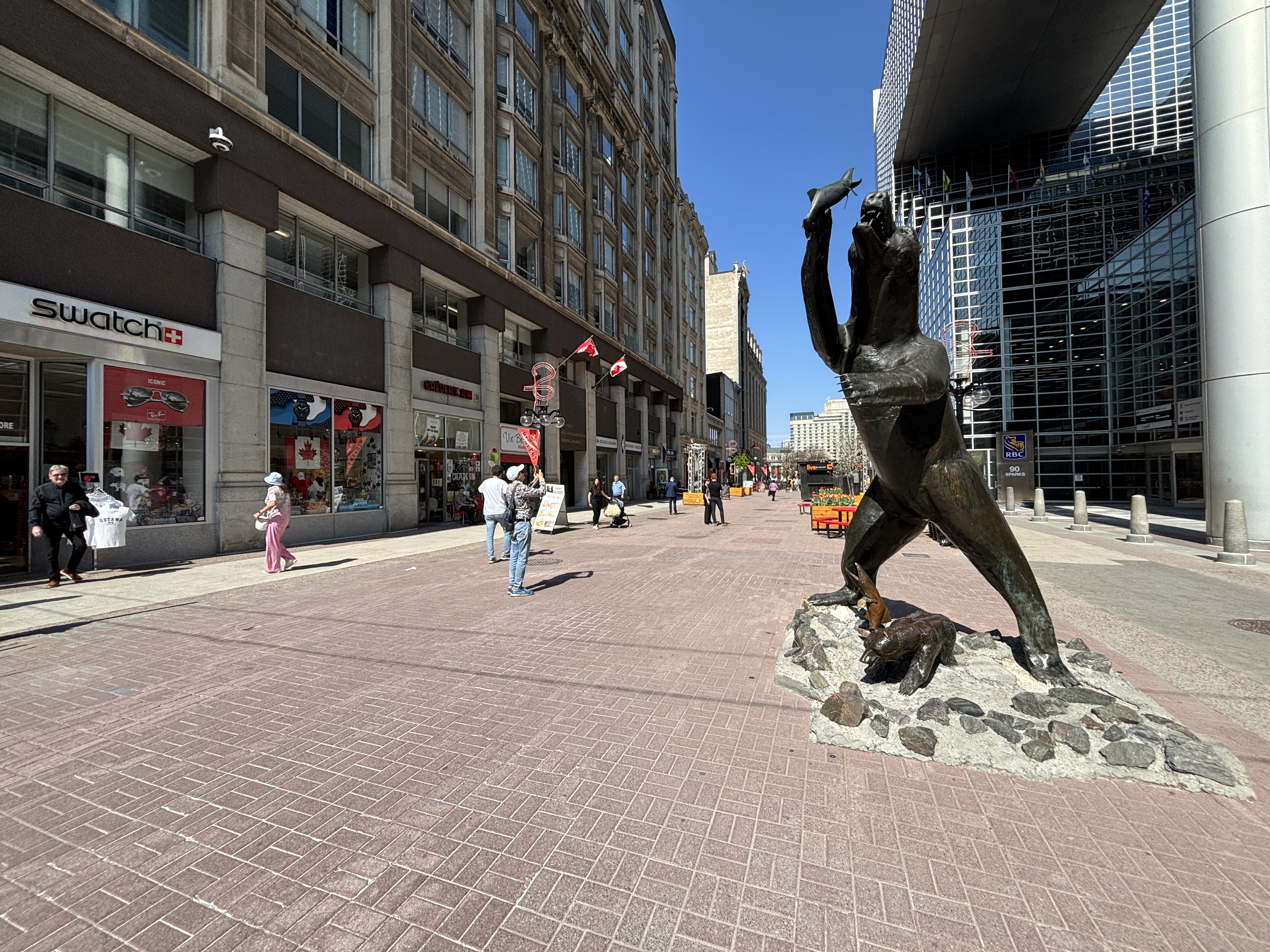
Sparks Street near Metcalfe Street in 2025

Starting in 1960, the street was closed to vehicular traffic in the summers in an attempt to improve commerce. This plan was modelled on Toledo, Ohio, which along with Kalamazoo were the first North American cities to close downtown streets in an attempt to recapture customers. The success of these temporary summer closings convinced the city to close the street permanently to vehicles in 1967. Although initially successful, the mall began to decline in the 1970s. Urban planning professor David Gordon, of Queen's University, blames the growth of suburban shopping malls. Another major problem was the growth of highrise government offices with internal concourses in the area. Gordan and Bray wrote that Sparks became "an isolated island of pedestrian-friendly space in a traffic-dominated district" in a 2003 report. Additionally, the Government of Canada is a major landlord on the street, its buildings presenting a "blank face" to the street, and discouraging shops from investing in the area long-term.

Today, the pedestrian mall is open year-round and extends from Elgin to Kent Streets. Although the mall is quite busy during the week, it is only lightly used on the weekend. The National Capital Commission remains committed to operating and improving the mall. The street's landscaping has been updated. The Commission was successful in bringing the CBC Ottawa Broadcast Centre to a location on the mall, and is seeking to increase business and activity by increasing the number of residences nearby. However, the CBC development has been criticized as "just another low-cost, banal building" which was designed poorly and has not brought more life to the street. Councillor Diane Holmes called it "the biggest disappointment," and "a whole block of deadness."

== Events ==
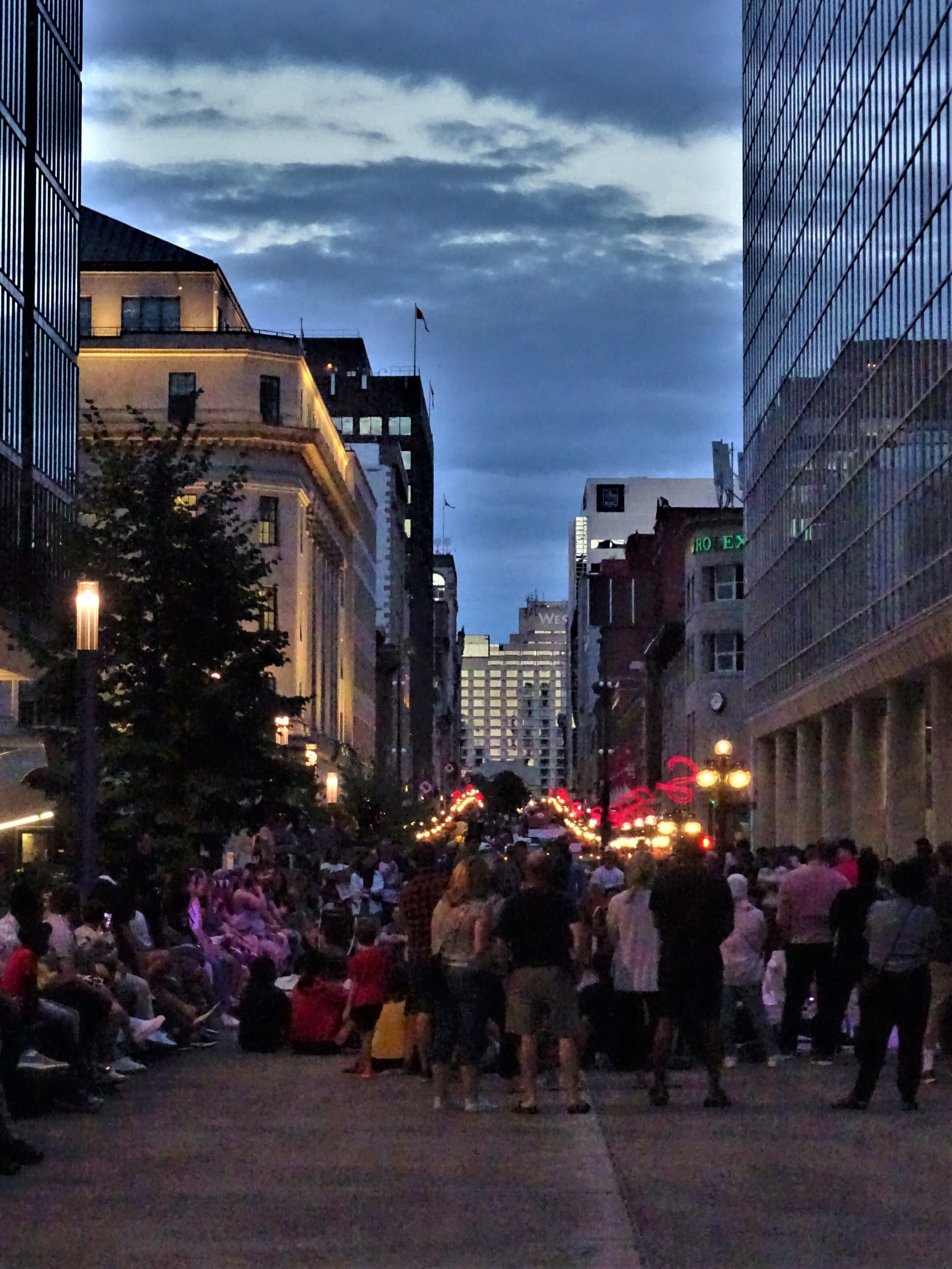
Crowd attending Ottawa International Busker Fest 2022

Sparks Street is home to the Sparks Street International Chicken & Rib Cook-off every year in late June.

Each year, around the August civic holiday, Sparks street plays host to the Ottawa International Buskers Festival, where buskers from around the world come to showcase their art to tourists and locals in downtown Ottawa.

Latin Sparks Festival made its debut in 2012 as a small group of 40 friends gathered weekly on Sparks Street to dance outdoors in the summertime. Sparks Street is home to Latin Sparks Festival since 2012, featuring music, dancing and food.

== Landmarks ==
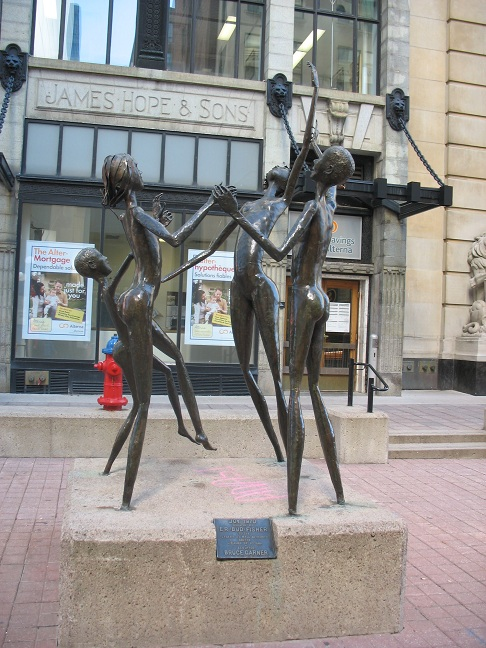
'Joy' copper sculpture at Sparks Street. Bruce Garner, 1970.

Sparks contains some of Ottawa's most important structures. Just past the eastern end of Sparks at Elgin Street is the National War Memorial and across Elgin from Sparks is the National Arts Centre.

The eastern section of the street has a number of the city's older buildings, including Ottawa's post office from 1939; the Ottawa Electric Building, built in 1926 by the founders of the Ottawa Electric Railway, Ottawa's streetcar system; Ottawa's first high-rise: the Bible House/old James Hope building at 61 Sparks, built in 1910; and branches of a number of Canada's banks from the same era.

A pair of notable newer buildings are also on this section of the mall, including the CBC Ottawa Broadcast Centre and the Thomas D'Arcy McGee Building, which is located at the corner of Metcalfe and Sparks Streets.

West of Bank Street, outside of the mall itself, the street is overshadowed by the C.D. Howe Building, the home of Industry Canada to the south, and the headquarters of the Bank of Canada to the north. West of the bank is the Ottawa Marriott Hotel and Place de Ville's Podium Building and Tower C, once the tallest building in Ottawa and home of Transport Canada. On the north side is home of the Department of Justice in St. Andrew's Towers and the East Memorial Building, with other government departments in the West Memorial Building. West of these buildings the street becomes far less notable, being home to several hotels and smaller buildings. The final block of this rather short street has the Garden of the Provinces and Territories to the north and Christ Church Cathedral, Ottawa's main Anglican church, to the south.

One of the best known addresses in all of Canada for many years was "56 Sparks Street, Ottawa" as it was the tag line used in a large number of radio and television commercials and commentaries made by Lotta Hitschmanova, founder of the humanitarian charity USC Canada, which moved to an office at 56 Sparks Street soon after it was created in 1945.

== Transit access ==
On September 14, 2019, the O-Train's Confederation Line was opened, under Queen Street and one block south of Sparks. Both Lyon and Parliament (Parlement in French) stations serves the area.
