= CBOFT-DT =

Television station in Ottawa, Ontario, Canada

- Ottawa, Ontario; Gatineau, Quebec; Canada
- Channels: Digital: 33 (UHF); Virtual: 9
- Branding: ICI Ottawa–Gatineau

Programming
- Affiliations: 9.1: Ici Radio-Canada Télé

Ownership
- Owner: Société Radio-Canada
- Sister stations: CBOT-DT, CBOF-FM, CBOX-FM

History
- First air date: June 24, 1955
- Former call signs: CBOFT (1955–2011)
- Former channel numbers: Analog: 9 (VHF, 1955–2011); Digital: 22 (UHF, 2006–2011), 9 (VHF, 2011–2013)
- Former affiliations: TVA (secondary, 1977–1978)
- Call sign meaning: CBC Ottawa Français Télévision

Technical information
- Licensing authority: CRTC
- ERP: 3.5 kW
- HAAT: 424.9 m (1,394 ft)
- Transmitter coordinates: 45°30′9″N 75°50′59″W

Links
- Website: ICI Ottawa–Gatineau

CBOFT-DT (channel 9) is an Ici Radio-Canada Télé station in Ottawa, Ontario, Canada, serving the National Capital Region. It is part of a twinstick with CBC Television station CBOT-DT (channel 4). The two stations share studios at the CBC Ottawa Broadcast Centre on Queen Street (across from the O-Train Line 1 light rail station) in Downtown Ottawa, alongside the main corporate offices of the CBC; CBOFT-DT's transmitter is located on the Ryan Tower at Camp Fortune in Chelsea, Quebec, north of Gatineau.

== History ==
CBOFT first signed on the air on June 24, 1955, as the first French-language television station in Ontario. Previously, CBOT aired both CBC and Radio-Canada programs.

For a brief time during 1977 and 1978, until CHOT opened, CBOFT also carried some TVA programs, after Ottawa's first TVA affiliate, CFVO-TV (whose channel 30 frequency is now occupied by CIVO) went bankrupt.

Due to cost-cutting measures at the CBC in the early 1990s, local programming on Toronto's CBLFT and its rebroadcasters, as well as CBLFT semi-satellite CBEFT in Windsor was discontinued in 1991. All Radio-Canada transmitters in Ontario (except the northwest, which was served by CBWFT in Winnipeg) were reclassified as rebroadcasters of CBOFT, under the name "Radio-Canada Ontario-Outaouais". The station produced two distinct newscasts through the 1990s and 2000s, one for the Ottawa region and one for the remainder of Ontario.

In 2010, the CBC applied to the CRTC to have CBLFT relicensed as a separate station, which would again produce a separate newscast for broadcast in most of the province outside of CBOFT's market. The application was approved on April 28, 2010, leading to CBLFT resuming newscast production from Toronto, and most of the network's transmitters in Ontario were reassigned to CBLFT's license. Following this split in the network, CBOFT and its Quebec transmitters became "Radio-Canada Ottawa-Gatineau", while most other Ontario transmitters became "Radio-Canada Ontario".

Prior to the arrival of the Ottawa Senators NHL team, the station would broadcast the Montreal Canadiens games on Saturday nights, while the English counterpart, CBOT, would carry the Toronto Maple Leafs games during the Saturday Hockey Night in Canada slot.

== Notable staff ==
- Pierre Dufault, sports journalist and political correspondent

== Technical information ==
=== Subchannel ===
Subchannel of CBOFT-DT
Channel	Res.	Short name	Programming
9.1	720p	CBOFT-D	Ici Radio-Canada Télé

=== Analog-to-digital conversion ===
On August 31, 2011, when Canadian television stations in CRTC-designated mandatory markets transitioned from analog to digital broadcasts, the station's digital signal relocated from UHF channel 22 to VHF channel 9. Due to reception issues on channel 9, the station was granted permission to move to UHF channel 33.

=== Transmitters/Former rebroadcasters of CBOFT ===
CBOFT operated three analog television rebroadcasters all located in Quebec in the following communities:

Station	City of licence	Channel	ERP	HAAT	Transmitter coordinates
CBOFT-1	Chapeau, QC	11 (VHF)	4.75 kW	114 m (374 ft)	45°55′29″N 77°4′22″W
CBOFT-2	Rapides-des-Joachims, QC	8 (VHF)	0.74 kW	20.1 m (66 ft)	46°11′58″N 77°42′39″W
CBOFT-3	Notre-Dame-du-Laus, QC	10 (VHF)	0.01 kW	NA	46°4′38″N 75°36′7″W

Due to federal funding reductions to the CBC, in April 2012, the CBC responded with substantial budget cuts, which included shutting down CBC's and Radio-Canada's remaining analog transmitters on July 31, 2012. None of CBC or Radio-Canada's rebroadcasters were converted to digital.
