= CBOT-DT =

Television station in Ottawa, Ontario, Canada

- Ottawa, Ontario; Gatineau, Quebec; Canada
- City: Ottawa, Ontario
- Channels: Digital: 25 (UHF); Virtual: 4
- Branding: CBC Ottawa (general); CBC Ottawa News (newscasts)

Programming
- Affiliations: 4.1: CBC Television

Ownership
- Owner: Canadian Broadcasting Corporation
- Sister stations: CBOFT-DT, CBO-FM, CBOQ-FM

History
- First air date: June 2, 1953
- Former call signs: CBOT (1953–2011)
- Former channel number: Analog: 4 (VHF, 1953–2011)
- Call sign meaning: CBC Ottawa Television

Technical information
- Licensing authority: CRTC
- ERP: 311.485 kW
- HAAT: 426.4 m (1,399 ft)
- Transmitter coordinates: 45°30′11″N 75°51′1″W

Links
- Website: CBC Ottawa

CBOT-DT (channel 4) is a CBC Television station in Ottawa, Ontario, Canada, serving the National Capital Region. It is part of a twinstick with Ici Radio-Canada Télé station CBOFT-DT (channel 9). The two stations share studios at the CBC Ottawa Production Centre on Queen Street (across from the O-Train Line 1 light rail station) in Downtown Ottawa, alongside the main corporate offices of the CBC; CBOT-DT's transmitter is located on the Ryan Tower at Camp Fortune in Chelsea, Quebec, north of Gatineau.

== History ==
Channel 4 logo used by CBOT for several years in the early 1980s.

CBOT went on the air for the first time on June 2, 1953 (broadcasting the coronation of the Queen of Canada, Elizabeth II), becoming the third television station in Canada. Before the launch of Télévision de Radio-Canada station CBOFT, CBOT aired both English and French-language programs.

During the late 1970s into the early 1980s, CBOT was known as "CBC 4 Ottawa", and its newscasts were known as CBC 4 News. In 1980, CBOT's 6 p.m. newscast was anchored by Ab Douglas, and by Joe Spence at 11:27, following The National. During the mid-1980s, the station was known as "CBOT 4", now "CBC Ottawa".

== News operation ==
CBOT-DT presently broadcasts 10 hours, 40 minutes of locally produced newscasts each week (with two hours each weekday, a half-hour on Saturdays and ten minutes on Sundays). CBOT airs local news programming in the form of a 90-minute newscast from 5 to 6:30 p.m. and a half-hour newscast at 11 p.m. on weekdays. On weekends, the station airs a half-hour 6 p.m. newscast on Saturdays and a ten-minute summary airs on Sundays at 11 p.m.

=== Notable former on–air staff ===
- Ian Black (CMOS-endorsed weathercaster) – meteorologist
- Rita Celli – former CBC News: Ottawa at Six anchor
- Lloyd Robertson

== Technical information ==
=== Subchannel ===
Subchannel of CBOT-DT
Channel	Res.	Short name	Programming
4.1	720p	CBOT-DT	CBC Television

=== Analog-to-digital conversion ===
On August 31, 2011, when Canadian television stations in CRTC-designated mandatory markets transitioned from analog to digital broadcasts, the station's digital signal remained on UHF channel 25, using virtual channel 4.

=== Transmitters ===
CBOT operated six analog television rebroadcasters in Eastern Ontario and included communities such as Pembroke. Due to federal funding reductions to the CBC, in April 2012, the CBC responded with substantial budget cuts, which included shutting down CBC's and Radio-Canada's remaining analog transmitters on July 31, 2012. None of CBC's or Radio-Canada's television rebroadcasters were converted to digital.

==== Former rebroadcasters of CBOT ====
Station	City of licence	Channel	ERP	HAAT	Transmitter coordinates	CRTC/Notes
CBOT-1	Foymount	14 (UHF)	42.3 kW	229.2 m	45°25′48″N 77°18′14″W	91-638; 2011-497
CBOT-2	Barry's Bay	19 (UHF)	8.6 kW	170.4 m	45°29′23″N 77°42′56″W	
CBOT-3	Whitney	9 (VHF)	0.01 kW	NA	45°29′18″N 78°12′22″W	
CBOT-4	Maynooth	51 (UHF)	1.535 kW	121.5 m	45°13′37″N 77°52′29″W	
CBOT-5	McArthur's Mills	33 (UHF)	4.286 kW	125.3 m	45°5′18″N 77°38′49″W	
CBOT-6	Deep River/ Pembroke	3 (VHF)	43.3 kW	152.2 m	46°2′40″N 77°28′4″W	90-1077
