= Downtown Ottawa =

- Neighbourhood
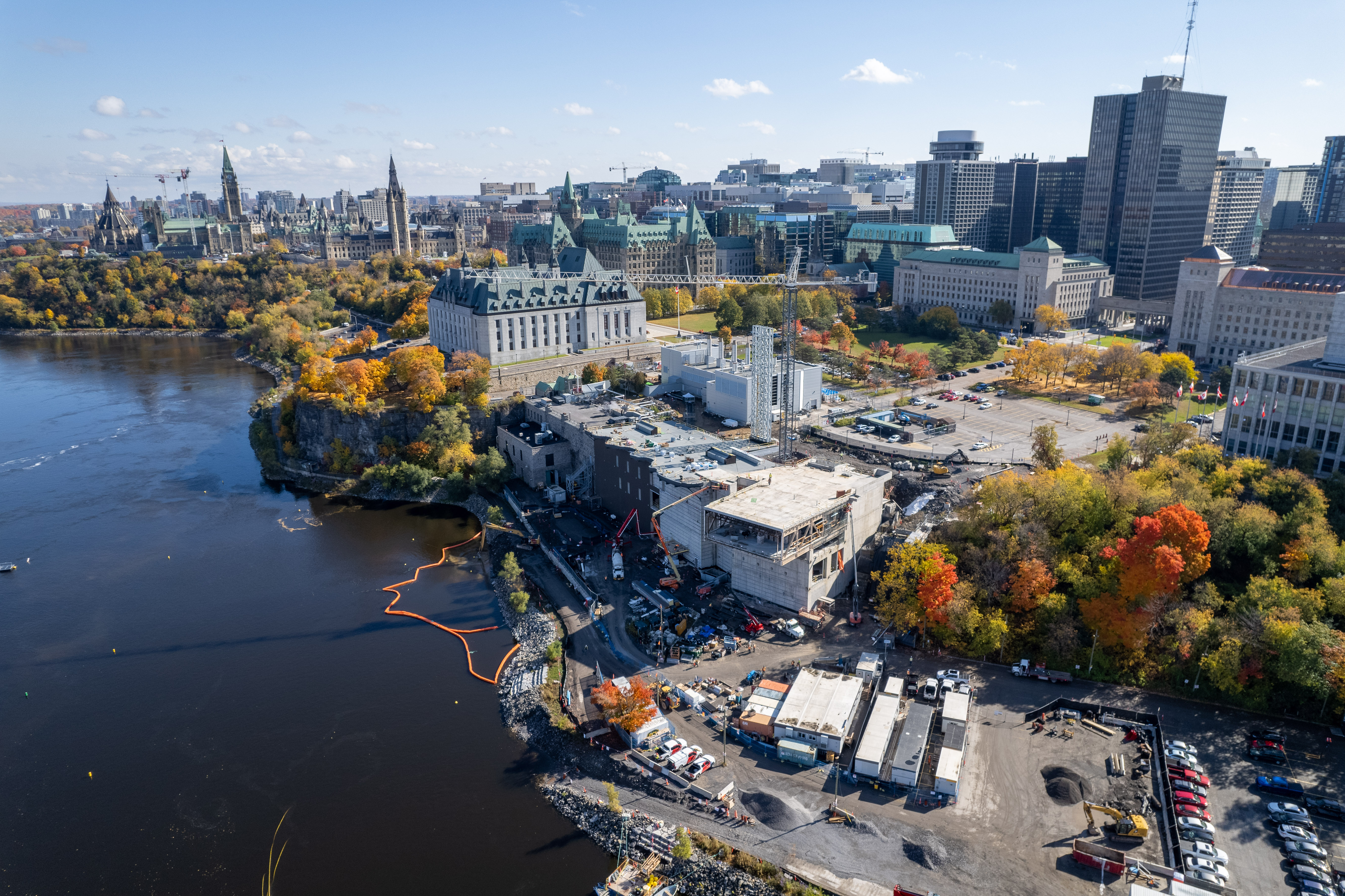
- Skyline of Downtown Ottawa pictured from above the Ottawa River

- Location within Ottawa
- Coordinates: 45°25′20″N 75°42′00″W
- Country: Canada
- Province: Ontario
- City: Ottawa

Government
  - MPs: Yasir Naqvi (Liberal)
  - MPPs: Catherine McKenney (NDP)
  - Councillors: Ariel Troster

Area
  - Total: 1.25 km^{2} (0.48 sq mi)
- Elevation: 75 m (246 ft)

Population (2021)
  - Total: 5,501
  - Density: 3,865.2/km^{2} (10,011/sq mi)
- Time zone: UTC−5 (EST)
  - Summer (DST): UTC−4 (EDT)
- FSAs: K1P, K1R

Downtown Ottawa is a neighbourhood located in the central area of Ottawa, Ontario, Canada. It is sometimes referred to as the central business district and contains Ottawa's financial district. It is bordered by the Ottawa River to the north, the Rideau Canal to the east, Gloucester Street to the south and Bronson Avenue to the west. This area and the residential neighbourhood to the south are also known locally as 'Centretown'. The total population of the area is 5,501 (2021 Census).

== Characteristics ==
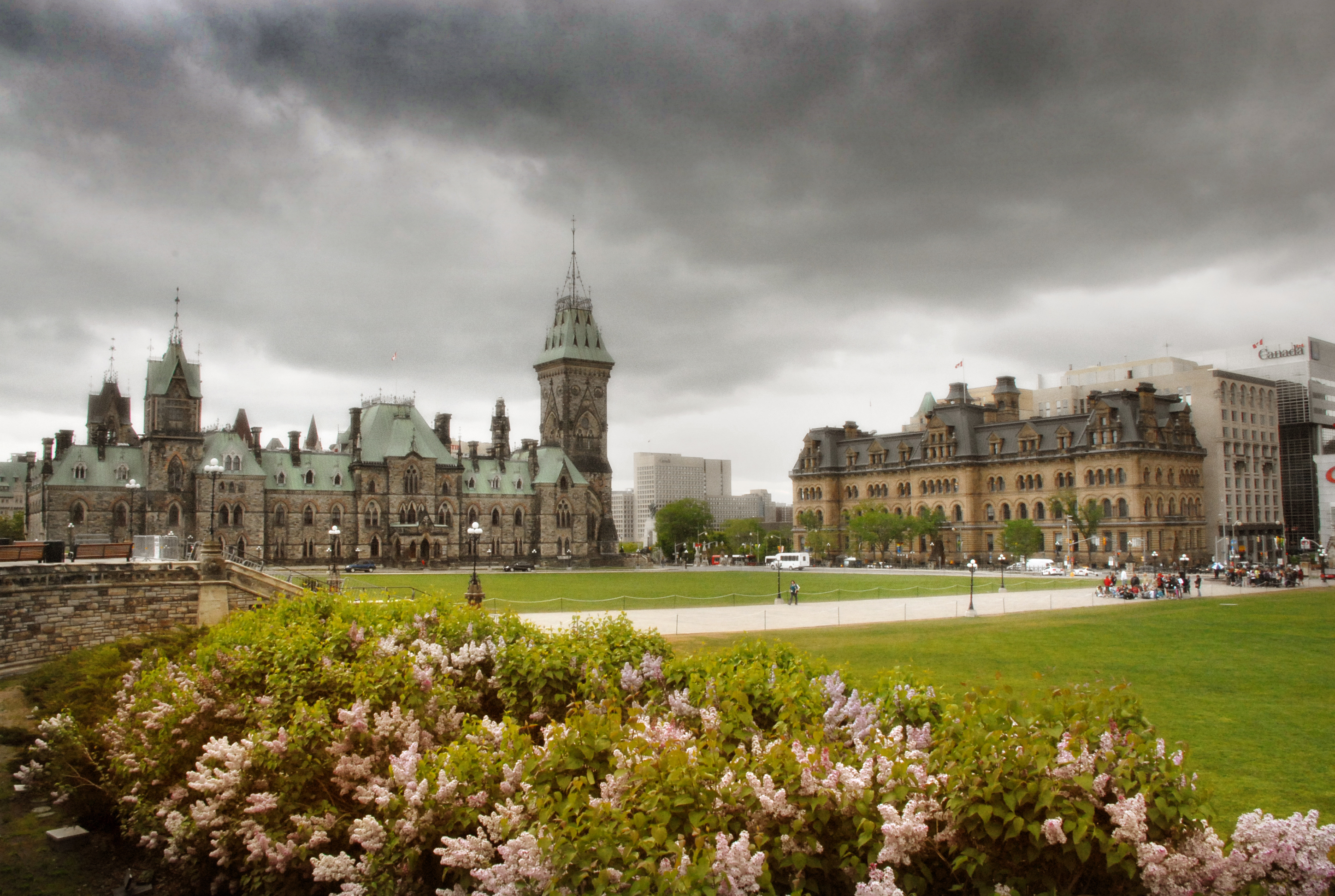
Downtown Ottawa is dominated by government buildings such as Parliament Hill (left) and The Office of the Prime Minister and Privy Council (right).

Downtown Ottawa is dominated by government buildings, including Parliament Hill and the Supreme Court. Most prominent buildings are situated along Wellington, Sparks and Elgin streets. Most of the buildings are office towers containing the various government departments. While most of Ottawa's high tech industry is based elsewhere it also has a significant presence in the downtown core. The downtown also contains a number of apartments, hotels, and condominiums as well as the older single family homes and townhouses along its edges.

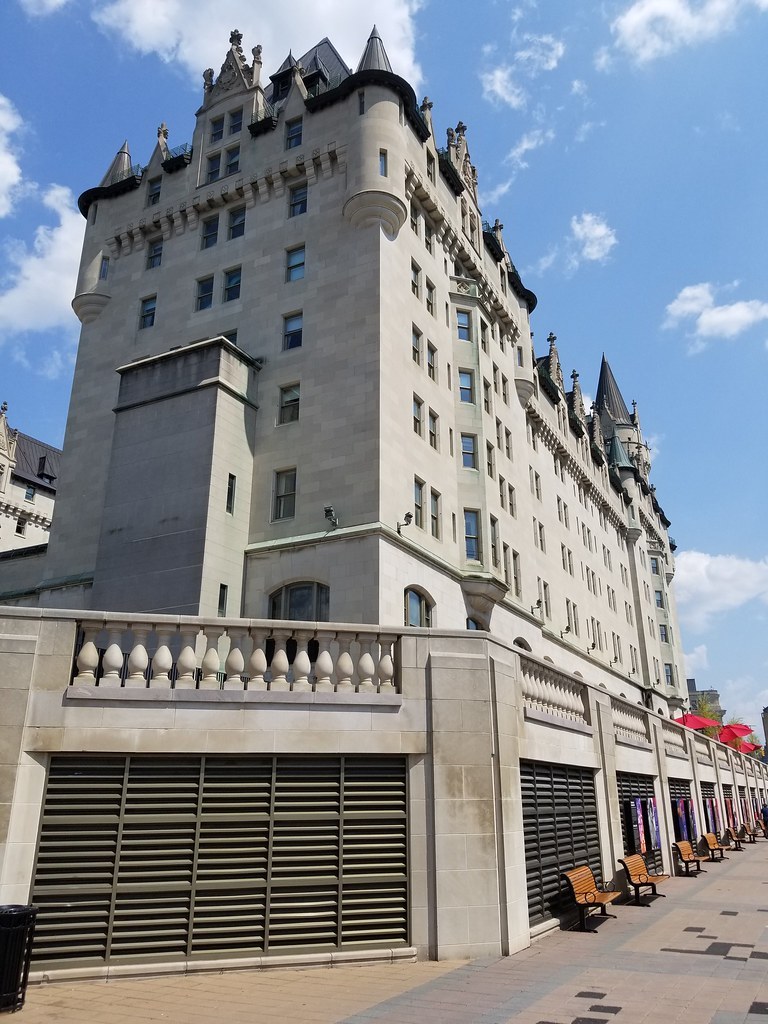
Fairmont Château Laurier

From Wellington to Laurier, Elgin Street is the site of several landmarks, the Château Laurier, the National Arts Centre, Lord Elgin Hotel, Place Bell Canada, the Ottawa Courthouse, and Ottawa City Hall. Other prominent buildings include World Exchange Plaza office and retail complex, encompassing a whole city block on the south-west corner of Queen and Metcalfe, featuring the 'clock ball' on top, and Place de Ville, a complex incorporating four office buildings and two large hotels on two city blocks, with all buildings interconnected through an underground retail concourse. There are also many prominent heritage buildings along Sparks Street.

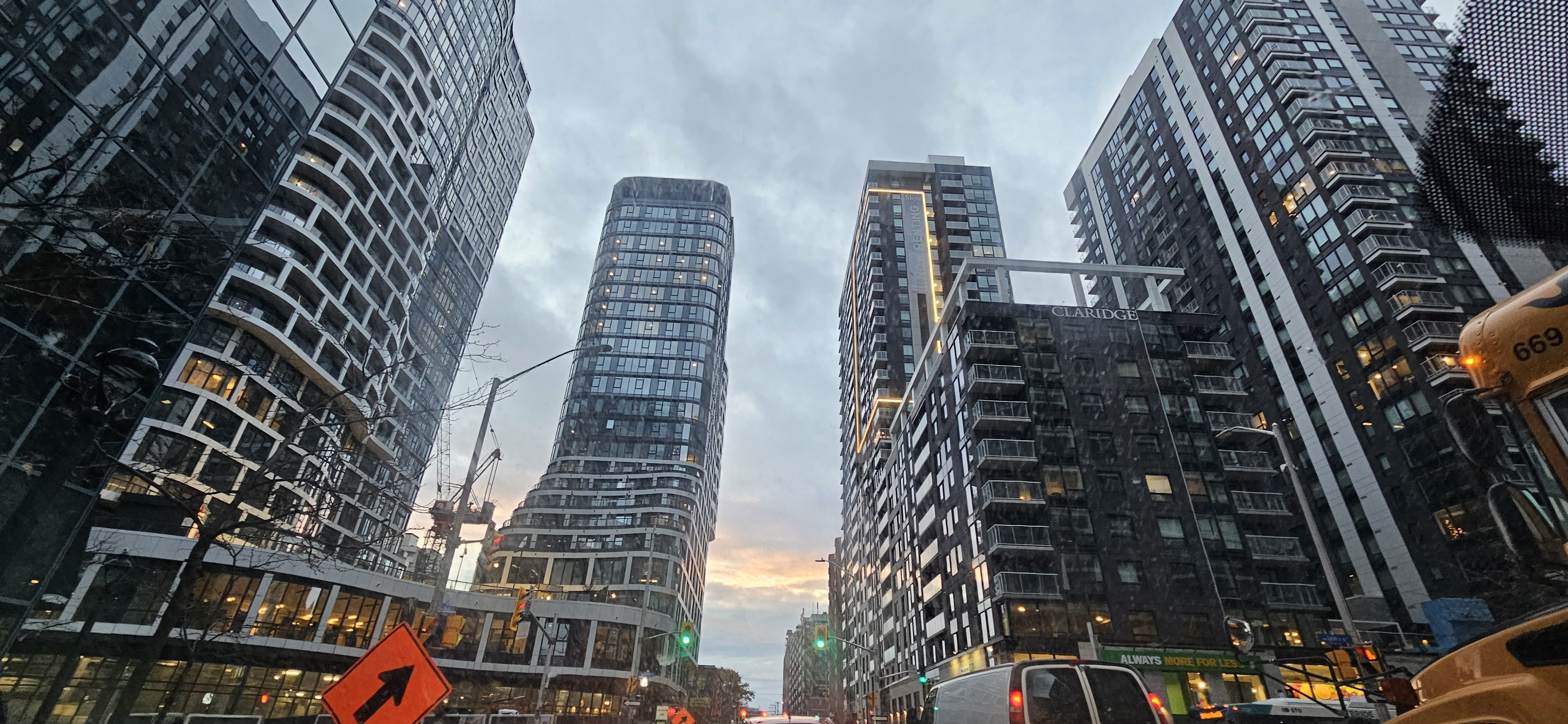
Albert Street

The towers of downtown Ottawa are not as tall as those in other cities, as legislation prevented buildings being built taller than 150 feet until the 1960s, so as not to overshadow the Parliament Buildings and the Peace Tower (similar to Washington, D.C.'s Heights of Buildings Act). Today, several buildings are taller than the Peace Tower, with the tallest being the 29-storey Place de Ville (Tower C) at 112 m (367 ft), which was built above the height limit, and several hotels being slightly shorter but with 30-35 stories.

The downtown employs about 100,000 people and currently holds around 20 million square feet (1.9 million square metres) of office space.

=== Surrounding areas ===
East of the canal, but west of King Edward Avenue, including the Rideau Centre and the ByWard Market, is also normally considered downtown, and is referred to locally as 'Lowertown' or Lower Town. The residential neighbourhoods around the central business district are also generally referred to as being downtown.

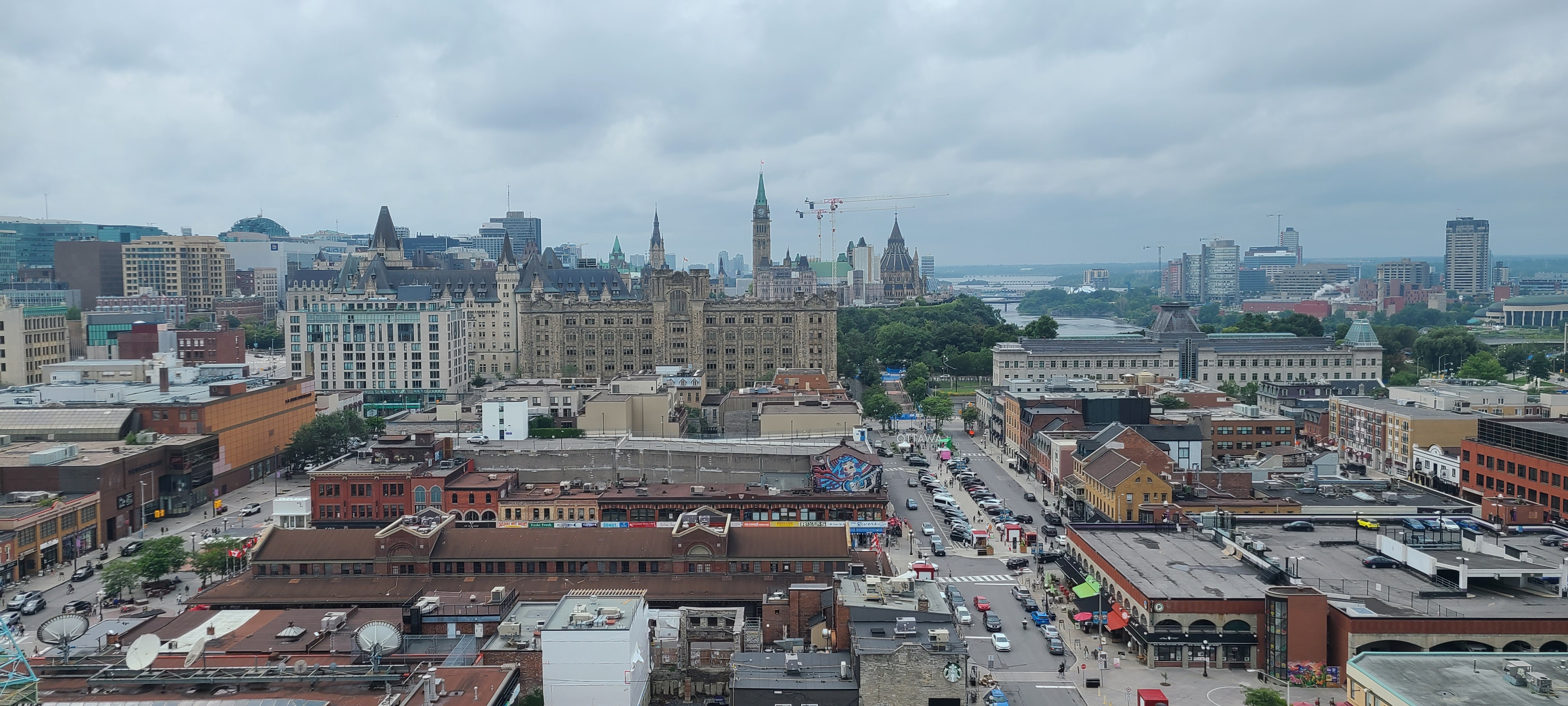
Downtown Ottawa view from the Market

These include Centretown to the south and Sandy Hill and Lower Town to the east. North of the Ottawa River the centre of Gatineau, Quebec, can be considered an extension of Ottawa's downtown.

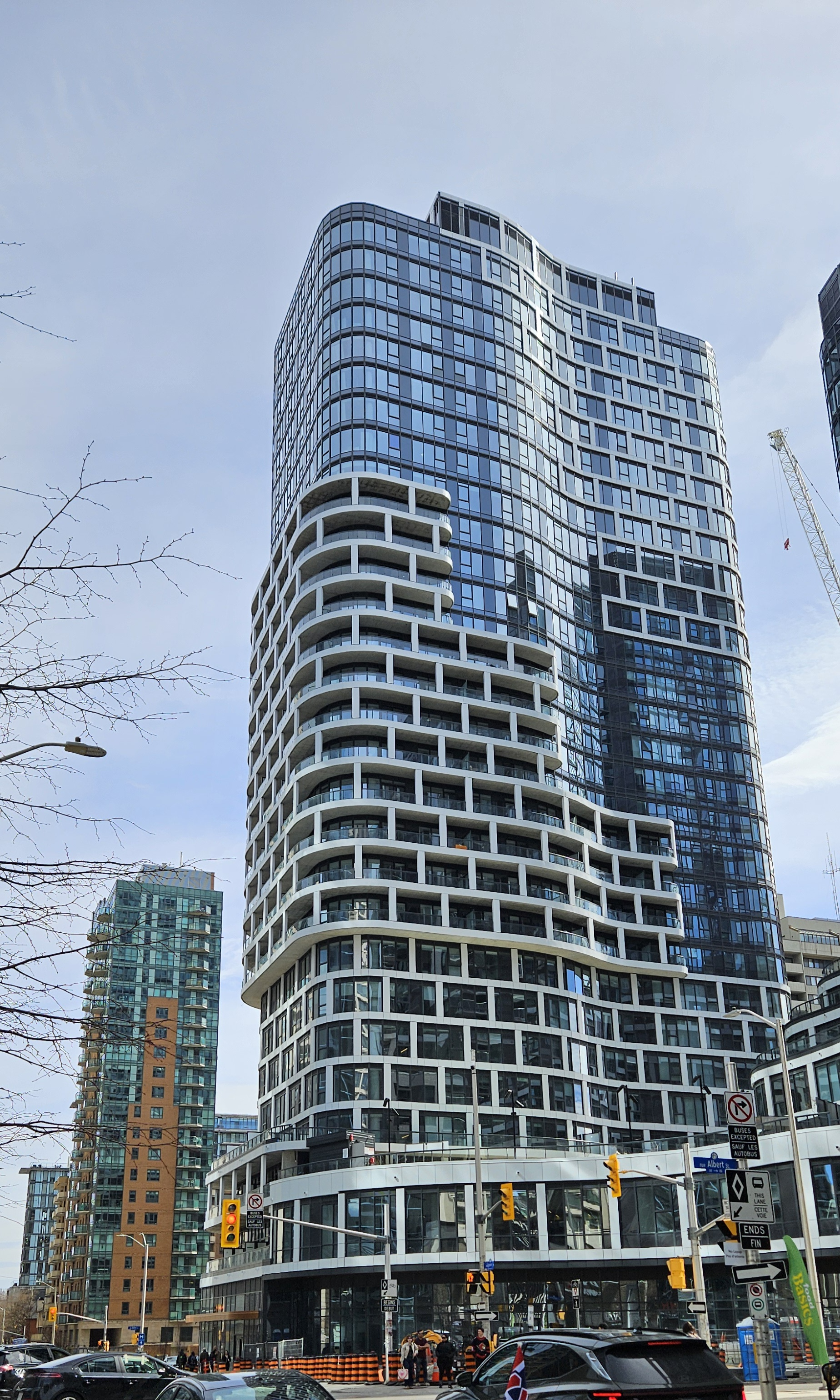

=== Landmarks ===
==== Religious ====
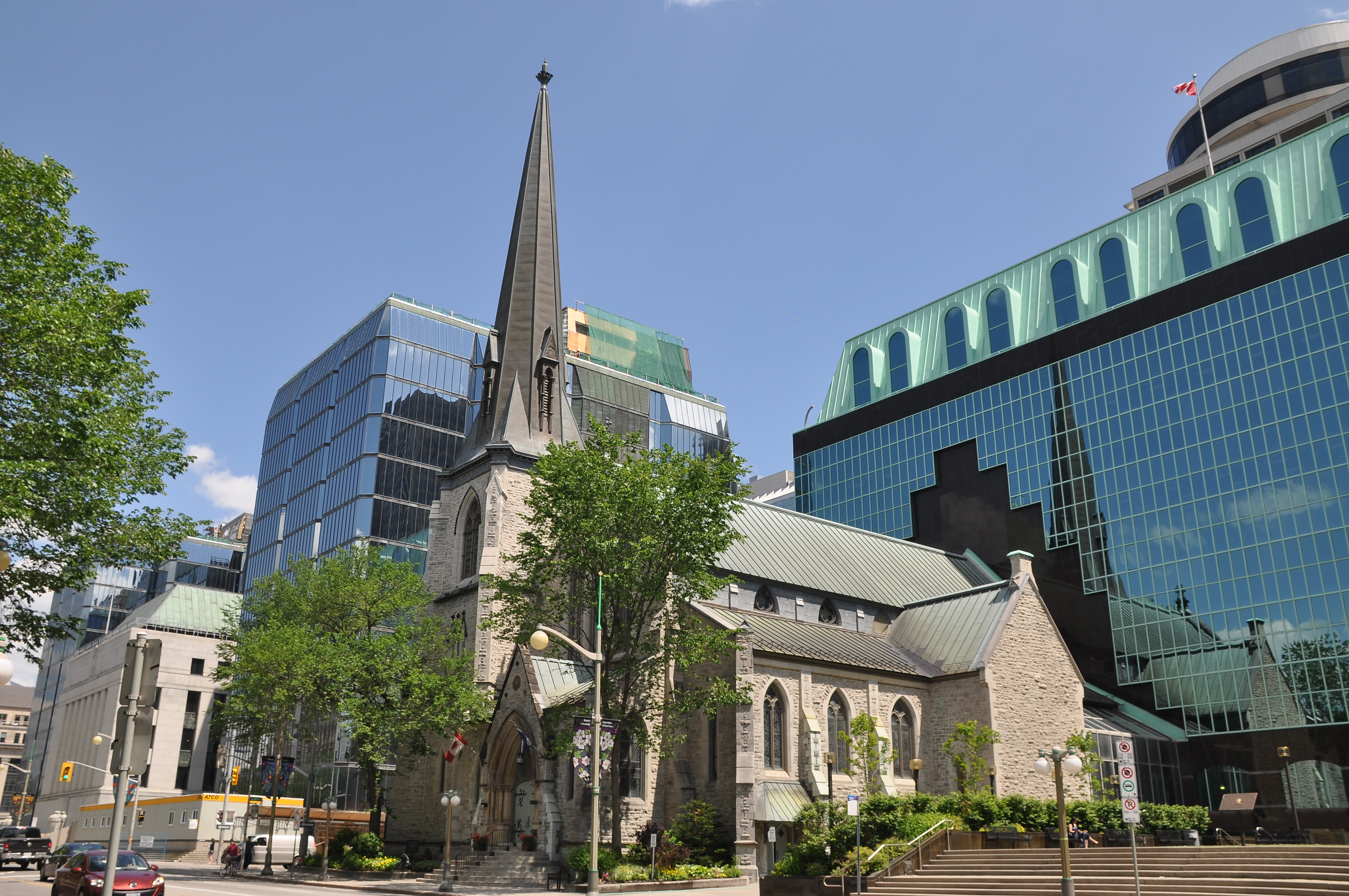
St. Andrew's Presbyterian Church is one of several churches located in Downtown Ottawa.

- City View International Church
- First Baptist Church
- Christ Church Cathedral
- Church of St. John the Evangelist
- Dominion-Chalmers United Church
- Knox Presbyterian Church
- St. Andrew's Presbyterian Church
- St Patrick's Basilica
- St. Peter's Lutheran Church
- St. Theresa's Catholic Church

== Demographics ==
According to the 2016 Canadian census. Area defined as the part of Ottawa north of Gloucester Street, east of Bronson, south of the Ottawa River and west of the Rideau Canal.

- Population: 4,876
- Change (2011–2016): +18.3%
- Total private dwellings: 3,965 (up from 3,256 in 2011)
- Land area: 1.26 km^{2} (0.49 sq mi)
- Population density: 3,865.2/km^{2} (10,011/sq mi)

Politically, it is within the federal and provincial ridings of Ottawa Centre.

== Transportation ==
=== Roads ===
==== Prominent streets ====
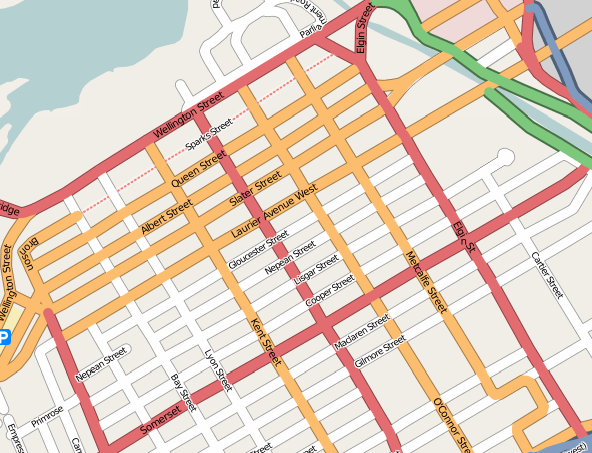
Map of downtown Ottawa

Downtown Ottawa has a grid pattern of streets, aligned either east-west or north-south with a number of the streets being one way.

From east to west, the prominent streets are Elgin Street, Metcalfe Street, O'Connor Street, Bank Street, Kent Street and Bronson Avenue.

Starting from the east:

- Elgin Street, a ceremonial route for the daily Changing of the Guard and site of many prominent buildings and landmarks, and a restaurant district south of Laurier Avenue,
- Metcalfe and O'Connor (which includes a bidirectional separate bike lane), both of which are busy multi-lane one-way streets,
- Bank Street runs through the heart of downtown and is a prominent retail centre,
- Kent Street, another busy multi-lane one way with high traffic volumes,
- Lyon, the edge of the central business district, with a wall of towering office buildings and hotels to the east and shorter buildings and parking lots to the west,
- Bay and Percy, are one way local residential streets, and,
- Bronson Avenue is a major avenue that forms the western edge of downtown.

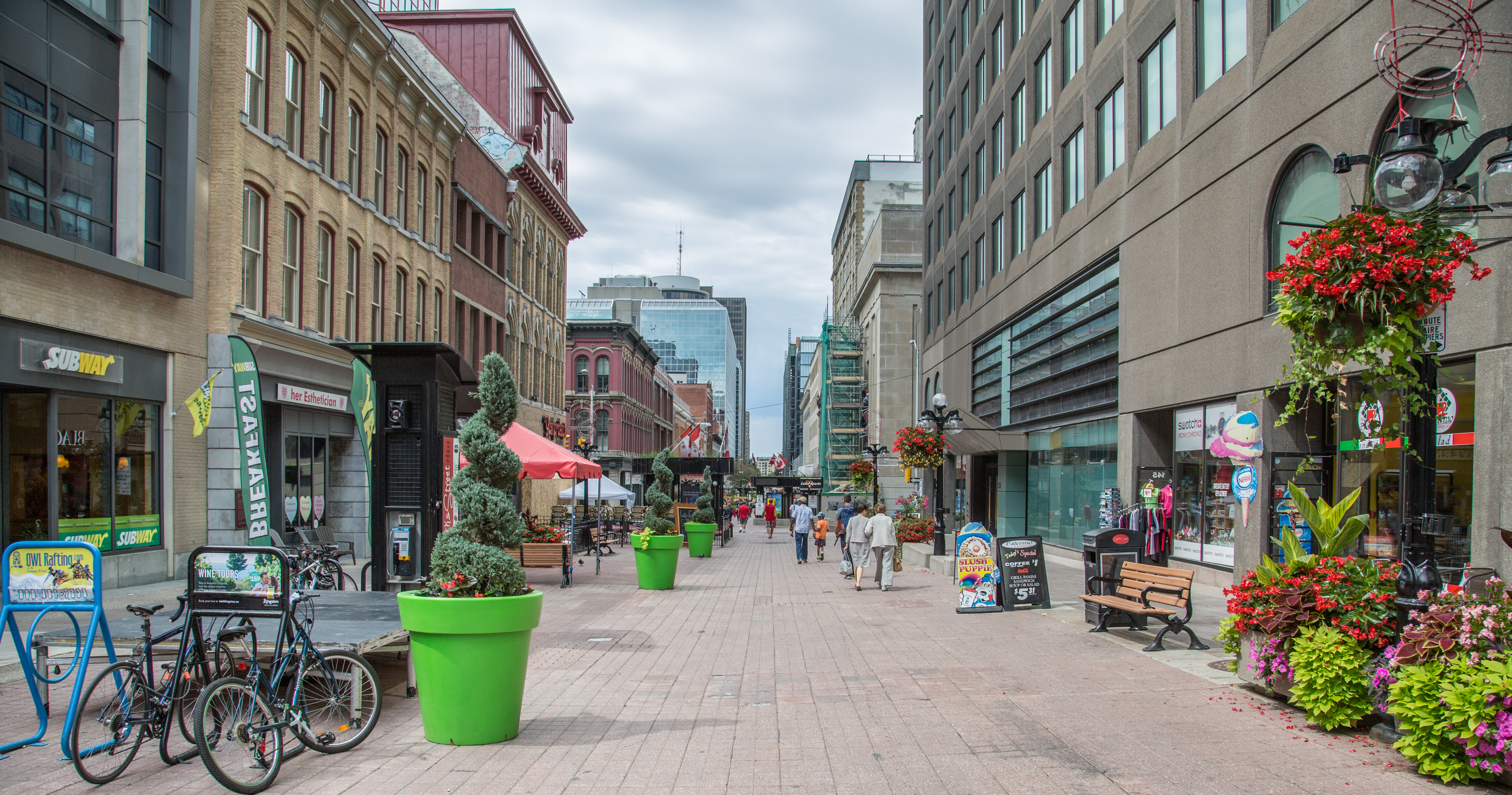
Sparks Street is a pedestrian mall in Downtown Ottawa, closed off to vehicle traffic.

The northernmost east-west street that crosses downtown is Wellington Street, site of the parliamentary precinct, National Library and Archives, and Supreme Court. It is a major four-lane thoroughfare. To the east, it connects to Rideau Street, and to the west, the Kichi Zibi Mikan.

South of Wellington is Sparks Street, most of which is a pedestrian mall closed to vehicles. The heritage district runs from Bank to Elgin, with CBC broadcast studios at Metcalfe and Sparks.

The streets to the south are dominated by office and hotel towers: Queen Street, Albert Street, Slater Street, Laurier Avenue and Gloucester Street.

The City of Ottawa zoning restricts and regulates development to allow high-rises north of Gloucester St. and affords heritage designation to some areas and buildings.

==== Other streets ====
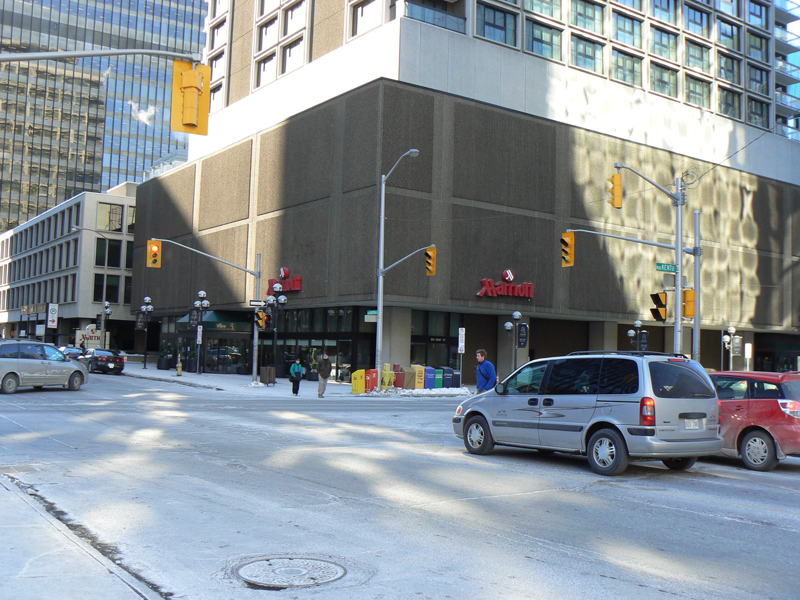
Intersection of Kent and Queen Streets. Ottawa

Other streets in Downtown Ottawa which go east-west (from north to south) include:

- Wellington Street
- Sparks Street
- Queen Street
- Laurier Avenue

Other streets in Downtown Ottawa which go north-south (from west to east) include:

- Bronson Avenue
- Kent Street
- Bank Street
- O'Connor Street
- Metcalfe Street
- Elgin Street

=== Transit service ===
Albert and Slater carry the Transitway through downtown. A new 12.5 km (7.8 mi) light rail line, called the Confederation Line opened in September 2019. Part of it is a tunnel under downtown's Queen Street and travel east to Rideau Street and turn south under Nicholas Street to eventually resurface south of Laurier Avenue East. Construction of the 2.1 billion dollar line, including the 2.5 km (1.6 mi) subway tunnel did not end in time for the 2017 celebration of Confederation's 150th anniversary. It includes three subway stations; one between Lyon and Kent Streets, integrated with Place de Ville, the next station was built between O'Connor Street and Metcalfe Street and one under Rideau Street with multiple entrances in the Rideau Centre.

==== Major transit stations ====
- Parliament station
- Lyon station
- Rideau station

== See also ==
- List of neighbourhoods in Ottawa
