= Parliament station =

Transit station in Ottawa, Canada

Parliament Parlement
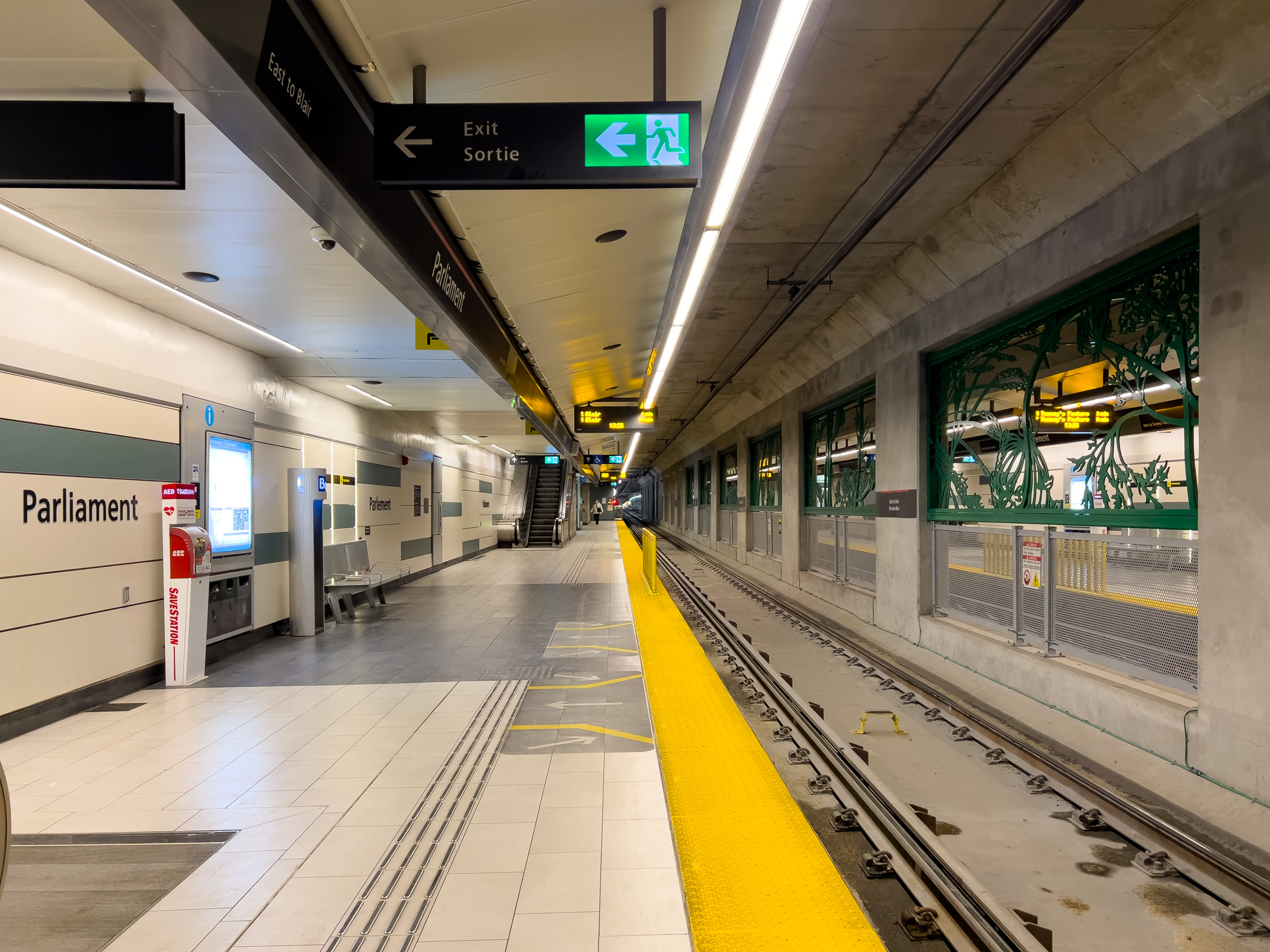
- Parliament Station, platform level

General information
- Location: O'Connor Street & Queen Street, Ottawa, Ontario; Canada
- Coordinates: 45°25′17″N 75°41′56″W
- Owner: OC Transpo
- Tracks: 2

Construction
- Structure type: Underground
- Accessible: Yes

History
- Opened: September 14, 2019

Services
Preceding station	OC Transpo	Following station
Lyon toward Tunney's Pasture	Line 1	Rideau toward Blair
Location

Parliament station (French: Station Parlement) is a station on Line 1 as part of the O-Train network in Ottawa, Ontario, Canada. The station is located under O'Connor and Queen Streets in Downtown Ottawa. It has the highest projected use of all new stops on Line 1, with access to Parliament Hill, Sparks Street, the downtown business district, as well as the World Exchange Plaza and Bank Street. The station is also near the CBC Ottawa Production Centre studios.

== Layout ==
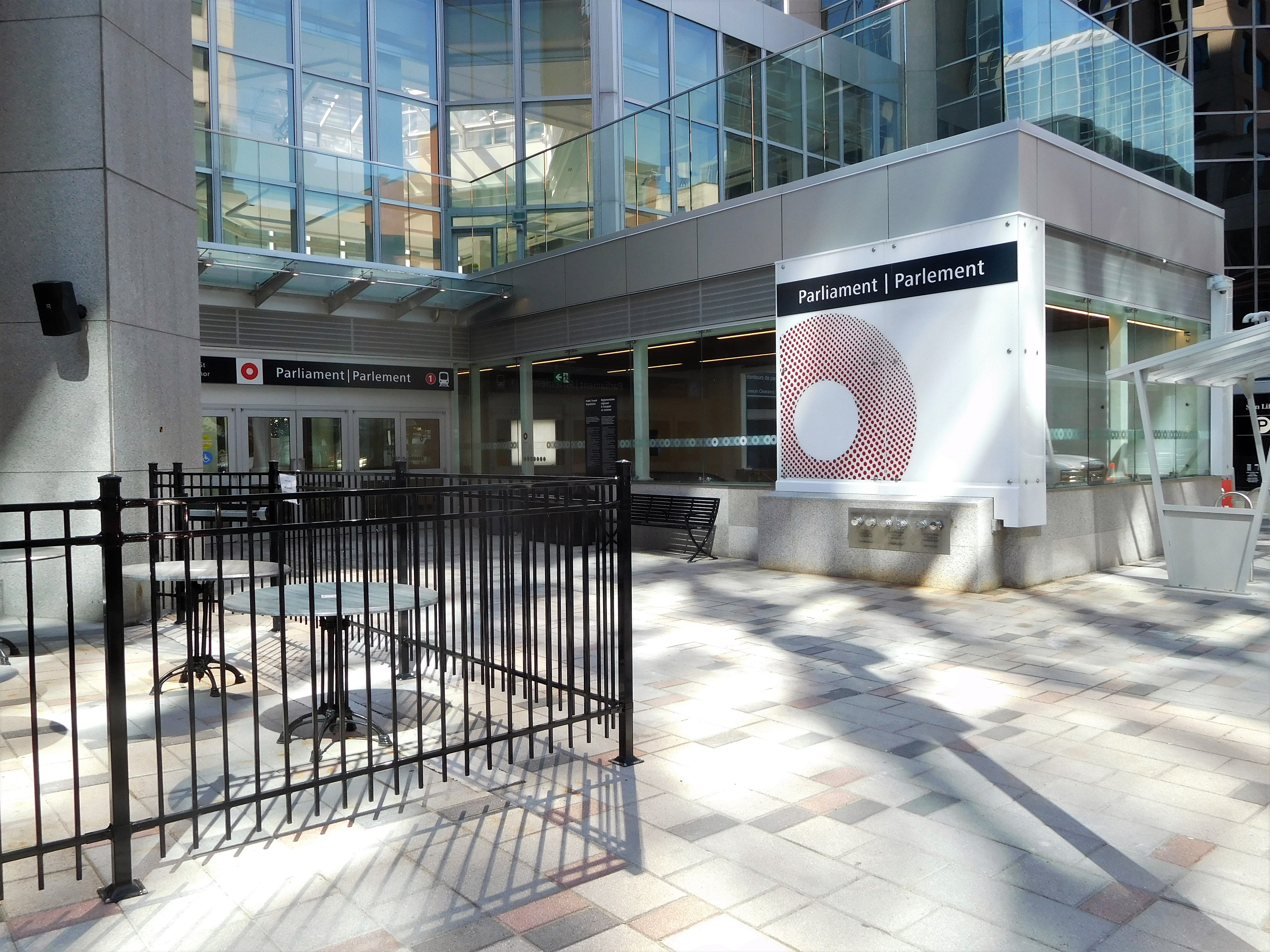
Street entrance

Parliament station is an underground station with two side platforms. A single Grand Hall Concourse is located immediately above platform level. The station's entrances are integrated with the Sun Life Financial Centre and Heritage Place; both lead to the centre of the concourse, with ticket barriers at either end leading to the ends of the platform.

The Grand Hall Concourse is 15 metres underground, while the platform itself is 19 metres.

The station features two artworks: Lone Pine Sunset by Douglas Coupland, an installation of brightly coloured panels based on Tom Thomson's The Jack Pine running along the ceiling of the concourse, as well as Trails: home and away by Jennifer Stead, a series of painted metal screens located between the two tracks at platform level.

== Service ==
Key
Line 1 (O-Train) Line 2 (O-Train) Line 4 (O-Train)	O-Train
E1	Shuttle Express
R1 R2 R4	O-Train replacement bus routes
N75	Night routes
40 12	Frequent routes
99 162	Local routes
275	Connexion routes
303	Shopper routes
405	Event routes
646	School routes
STO	Société de transport de l'Outaouais routes
Additional info: Line 1: Confederation Line; Line 2: Trillium Line; Line 4: Airport Link; Routes 5 to 199: Custom routing that that connects to Line 1 and/or 2; Routes 200 to 299: Connexion (peak-period only routes that connect to the O-Train); Routes 301 to 305: Shopper Routes (limited rural service); Routes 404 to 406: Canadian Tire Centre events; Routes 450 to 456: Lansdowne Park events; Routes 600 to 699: School Routes; Route R1: replaces Line 1 when it is out of service; Route R2: replaces Line 2 when it is out of service; Route R4: replaces Line 4 when it is out of service; Routes N39 to N98: night service (replaces Line 1 and N98 replaces Line 4); White backgrounds: limited service; Last two digits represent service area: 00s and 10s – Central; 20s – Gloucester; 30s – Orléans; 40s – Ottawa East; 50s – Ottawa West; 60s – Kanata, Stittsville; 70s – Barrhaven; 80s – Nepean; 90s – South Keys

The following routes serve Parliament station as of October 6, 2019:

Stops	Routes
East O-Train	Line 1 (O-Train)
West O-Train	Line 1 (O-Train)
A Queen St. East	6 7 10 11 12 15 17 19 N57 N61 N63 N75
B Queen St. West	6 7 10 11 12 N57 N61 N63 N75 450
C O' Connor St. South	none
D #7682 Bank St. South	STO
E Bank / Wellington	STO
F Albert / Bank	R1 E1
G Slater / Bank	R1 E1
