= Queen Street, Ottawa =

Thoroughfare in Ottawa, Ontario

Queen Street
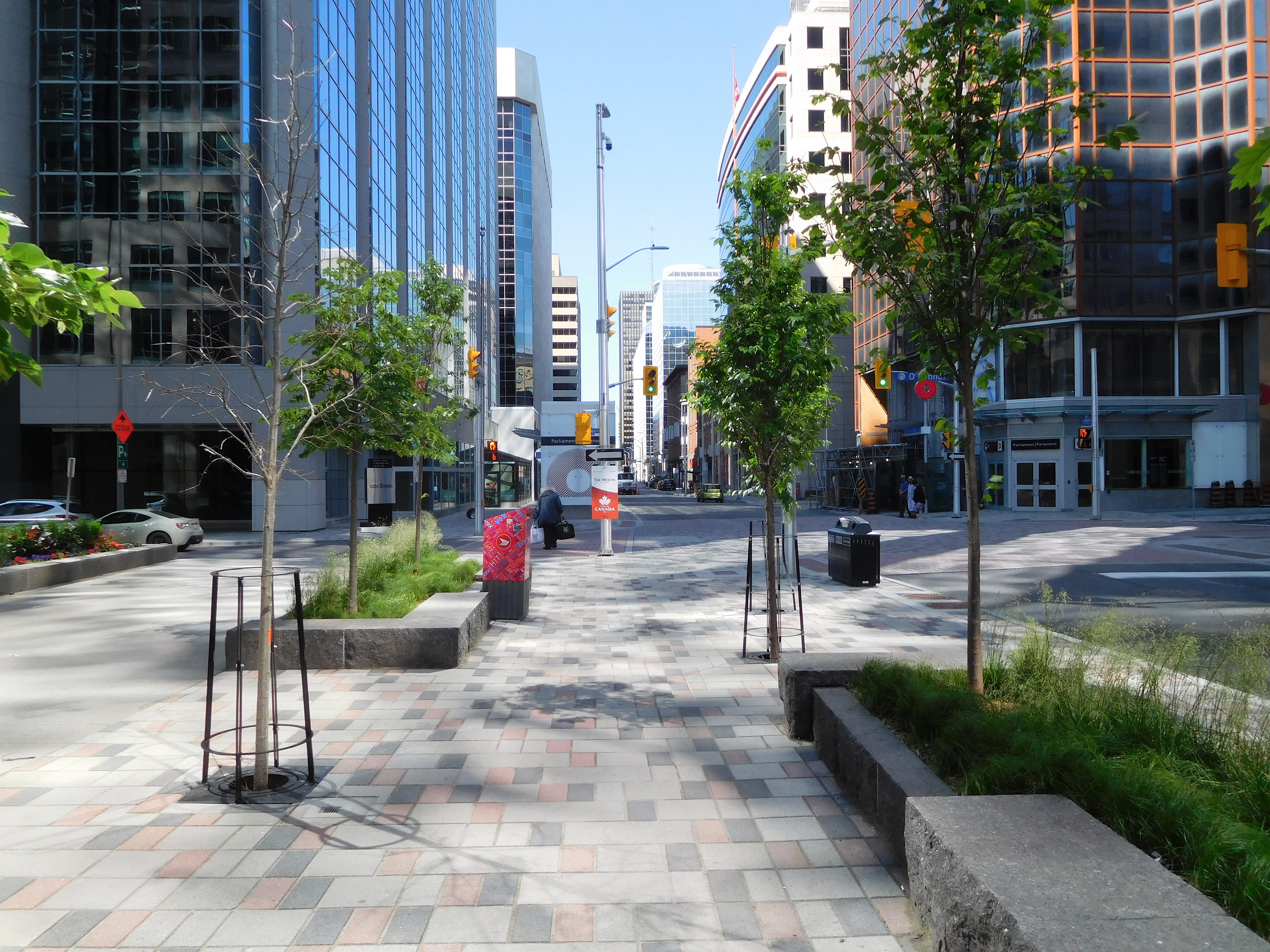
- Length: 1.4 km (0.87 mi)
- East end: Elgin Street
- Major junctions: O'Connor Street; Bank Street; Kent Street; Lyon Street
- West end: Bronson Avenue

Queen Street is an east–west arterial road located in Downtown Ottawa, Ontario, Canada. The street is two-way with one to two lanes going in each direction. O-Train Line 1 runs underneath Queen Street.

== Route description ==
The road is only 1.4 kilometres (0.87 mi) long, making it a little longer than Sparks Street. The road begins to the east at Elgin Street, at the intersection of Elgin and Lawrence Freiman Lane. From eastbound on Queen Street the northbound section of Elgin appears to be a continuation of Queen. Heading west the road has two lanes in each direction. The road is surrounded by skyscrapers, many of which are used by the Canadian government.

== Renewal ==
From Metcalfe Street to Bay Street, the road is reduced to a single eastbound lane due to construction. The City of Ottawa is renewing the street in anticipation of the Confederation Lines' opening as well as to build the tunnels and stations for the Confederation Line. The city is expanding the pedestrian infrastructure on the street, adding wide boulevard sidewalks, priority crosswalks, and additional landscaping. The construction also includes shared bike lanes, upgrades to sanitary sewers and storm sewers, the addition of planters and street furniture, installation of curbs and resurfacing of the street. The construction will be done at the same time as Confederation Line construction as two Confederation Line stations will be located on Queen Street. Queen Street is planned to become Downtown Ottawa's (Transit) Showcase Street. It will have wide sidewalks, decor, and it will be pedestrian-friendly for economic opportunity. The renewal has been identified as a "priority move", but has proved controversial.

=== Historic burial site ===
While the water mains on Queen Street were being replaced in 2013, workers discovered several human bones and later an historical burial site. The burial site was Ottawa's oldest Christian cemetery dating back to around 1828-1845. Archaeologists found the remains of 19 individuals, and they suspect that there are around 500 people buried there. The burial site is believed to have been for workers constructing the Rideau Canal. Researchers think that it extends to Queen Street to the south, Sparks Street to the north, Elgin Street to the east, and Metcalfe Street to the west.

== Public transit ==
Queen Street is currently served by route 10 from Bay Street to Elgin Street eastbound and Elgin Street to Lyon Street westbound, route 16 from Bay Street to O'Connor Street eastbound and Elgin Street to Lyon Street westbound. The route is also served by routes 7 and 6 from Bank Street to Elgin Street. O-Train Line 1 has Lyon and Parliament stations of Queen Street.

OC Transpo routes on Queen Street
Route	Direction	Eastern limit	Western Limit
Line 1	Both	Elgin Street	Bronson Avenue
6	Both	Elgin Street	Bank Street
7	Both	Elgin Street	Bank Street
10	Eastbound	Elgin Street	Bay Street
10	Westbound	Elgin Street	Lyon Street
16	Eastbound	O'Connor Street	Bay Street
16	Westbound	Elgin Street	Lyon Street

== See also ==
- Royal eponyms in Canada
