= Flaw =

Flaw or flaws may refer to:

== Music ==
=== Artists ===
- Flaw (band), an American nu metal band
- The Flaws, an Irish indie-rock band

=== Albums ===
- Flaw (album), by Flaw, 1998
- Flaws (album), by Bombay Bicycle Club, 2010

=== Songs ===
- "Flaws" (song), by Bastille, 2011
- "Flaws", by Callum Scott from Bridges, 2022
- "Flaws", by Olly Murs from 24 Hrs, 2016
- "Flaws", by Take That from III, 2014

== People ==
- Fane Flaws (1951–2021), New Zealand musician
- Tom Flaws (1932–2021), New Zealand cricketer

== Other uses ==
- Flaw (defect), a product defect
- Flaw (wine), a wine fault
- Character flaw, a literary device
- Flaw, a fictional agent for the Lords of Chaos in the DC Comics universe

== See also ==
- The Flaw (disambiguation)
- Flawless (disambiguation)
- Blemish (disambiguation)
- Defect (disambiguation)
- Fallacy, an error in logical reasoning
- Fault (disambiguation)
- Flaw hypothesis methodology, a computer security technique
- Flaw lead, an oceanographic feature
- Flawed (disambiguation)
