= Defect concentration diagram =

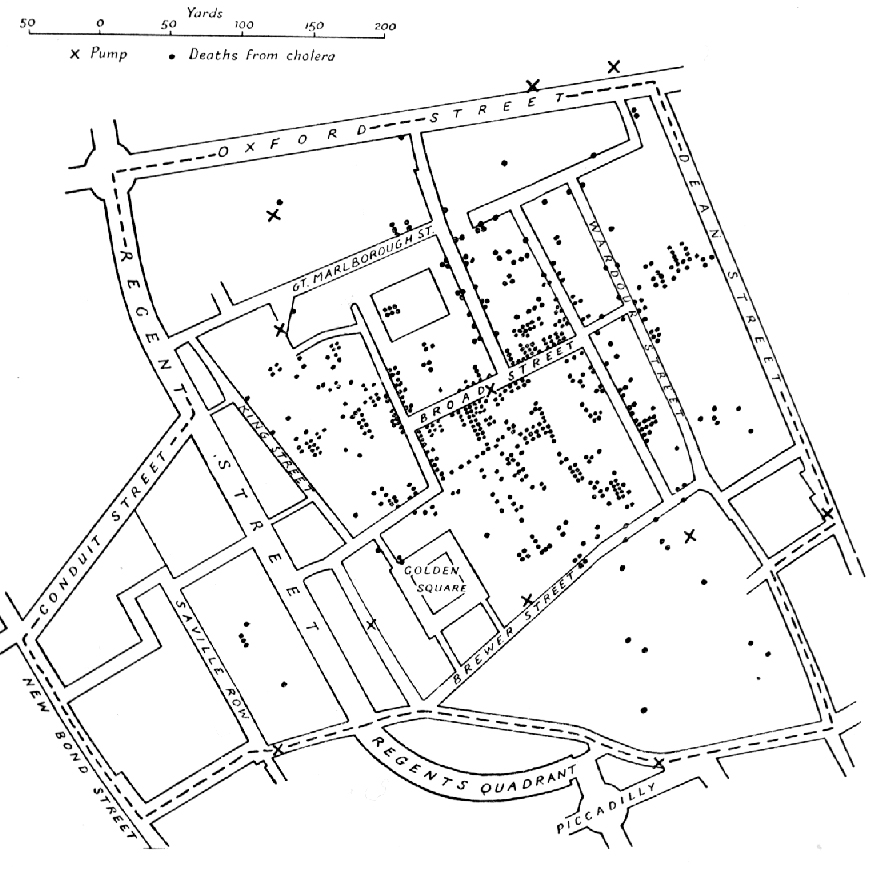
Concentration diagram of Cholera deaths 1854 in London (John Snow (1813-1858))

The defect concentration diagram (also problem concentration diagram) is a graphical tool that is useful in analyzing the causes of the product or part defects. It is a drawing of the product (or other item of interest), with all relevant views displayed, onto which the locations and frequencies of various defects are shown.

== Usage ==
Defect concentration diagram is used effectively in the following situations:

1. During data collection phase of problem identification.
2. Analyzing a part or assembly for possible defects.
3. Analyzing a product (or a part of a product) being manufactured with several defects.

== Steps ==
There are a number of steps that are needed to be follow when constructing the defect concentration diagram:

1. Define the fault or faults (or whatever) being investigated.
2. Make a map, drawing, or picture.
3. Mark on the diagram each time a fault (or whatever) occurs and where it occurs.
4. After a sufficient period of time, analyze it to identify where the faults occur.
