= Alcoholic Beverage Labeling Act =

American law

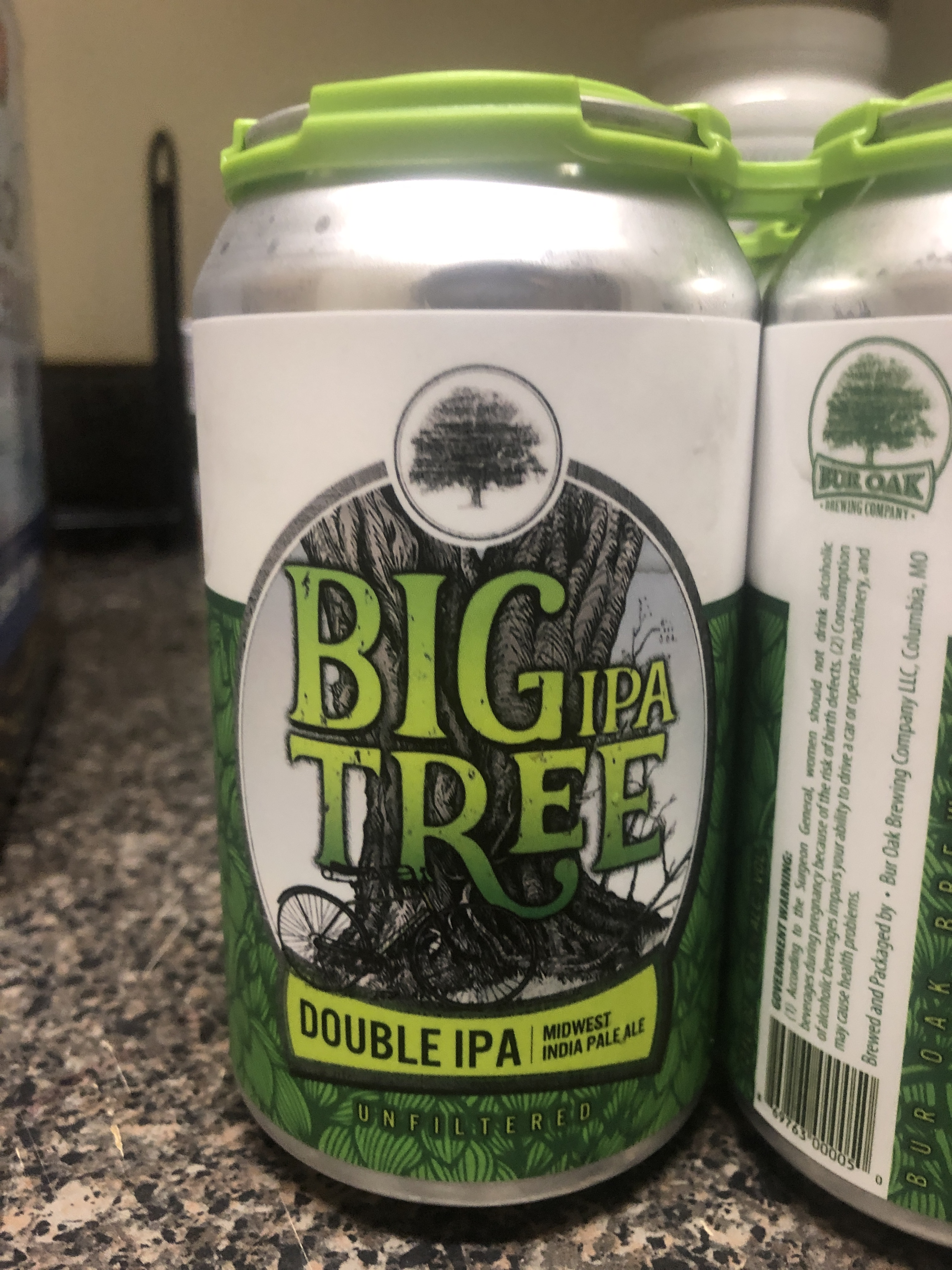
The Alcoholic Beverage Labeling Act warning on a beer can

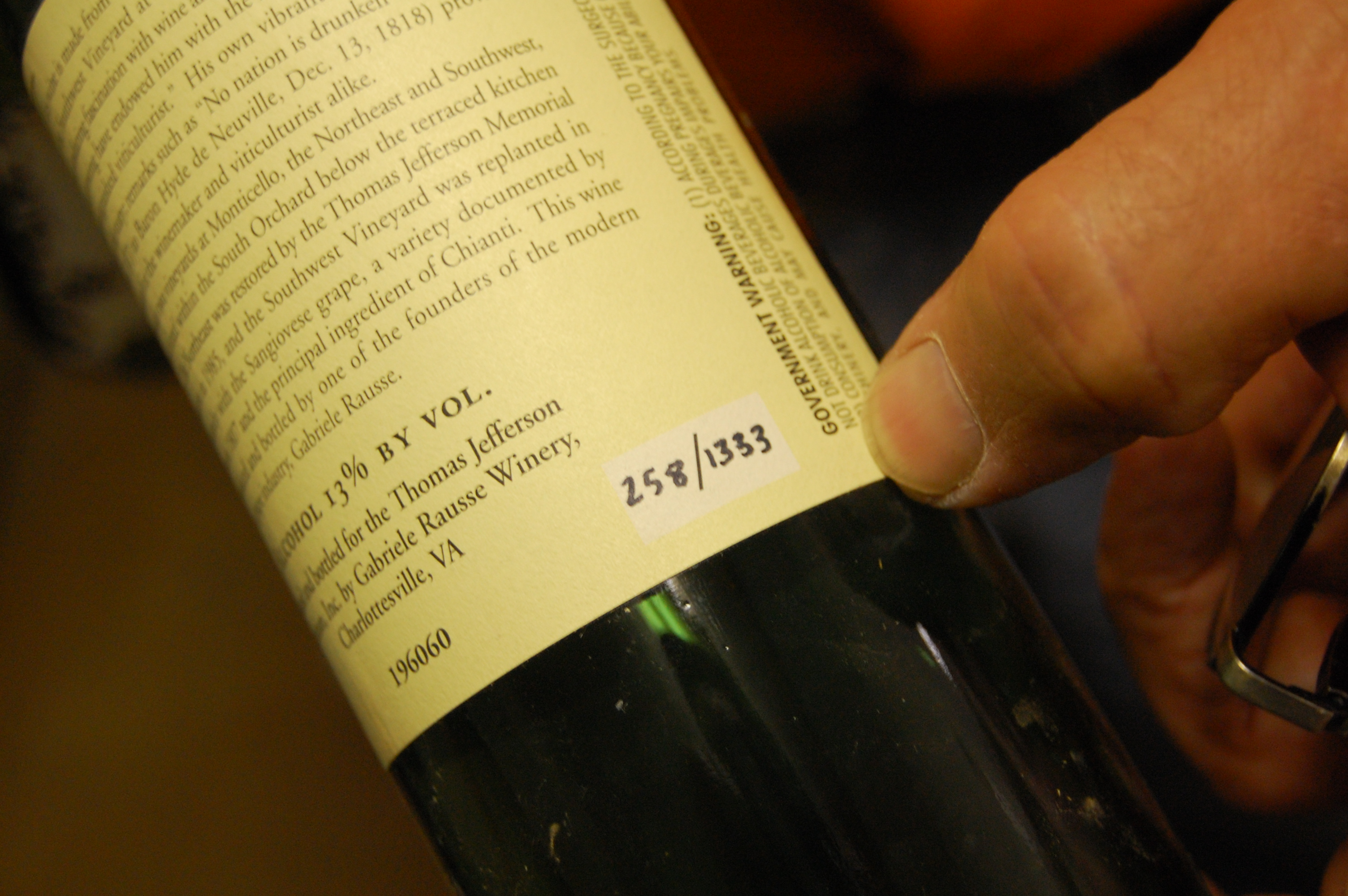
The warning on a wine bottle

The Alcoholic Beverage Labeling Act (ABLA) of the Anti-Drug Abuse Act of 1988, Pub. L. 100–690, 102 Stat. 4181, enacted November 18, 1988, H.R. 5210, is a United States federal law requiring that (among other provisions) the labels of alcoholic beverages carry an alcohol warning label.

The warning label reads:

GOVERNMENT WARNING:

(1) According to the Surgeon General, women should not drink alcoholic beverages during pregnancy because of the risk of birth defects.

(2) Consumption of alcoholic beverages impairs your ability to drive a car or operate machinery, and may cause health problems.

The ABLA also contains a declaration of policy and purpose, which states that the United States Congress finds that

the American public should be informed about the health hazards that may result from the consumption or abuse of alcoholic beverages, and has determined that it would be beneficial to provide a clear, nonconfusing reminder of such hazards, and that there is a need for national uniformity in such reminders in order to avoid the promulgation of incorrect or misleading information and to minimize burdens on interstate commerce.

Research evidence suggests that the warnings are not very effective as many people do not notice them. Additionaly, although drinking alcohol is harmful to health under all circumstances, the labels warn only about not drinking under specific circumstances, with messages about impaired driving and fetal alcohol spectrum disorders. All of these traits have been shown to make labels less effective, in lab and virtual studies. Tim Stockwell, one of the researchers designing the Northern Territories Alcohol Labels Study, described evidence on the effectiveness of the labels mandated by the Alcoholic Beverage Labeling Act as "pretty moot because the labels are so bad."

== 2025 updates recommended by the Surgeon General ==
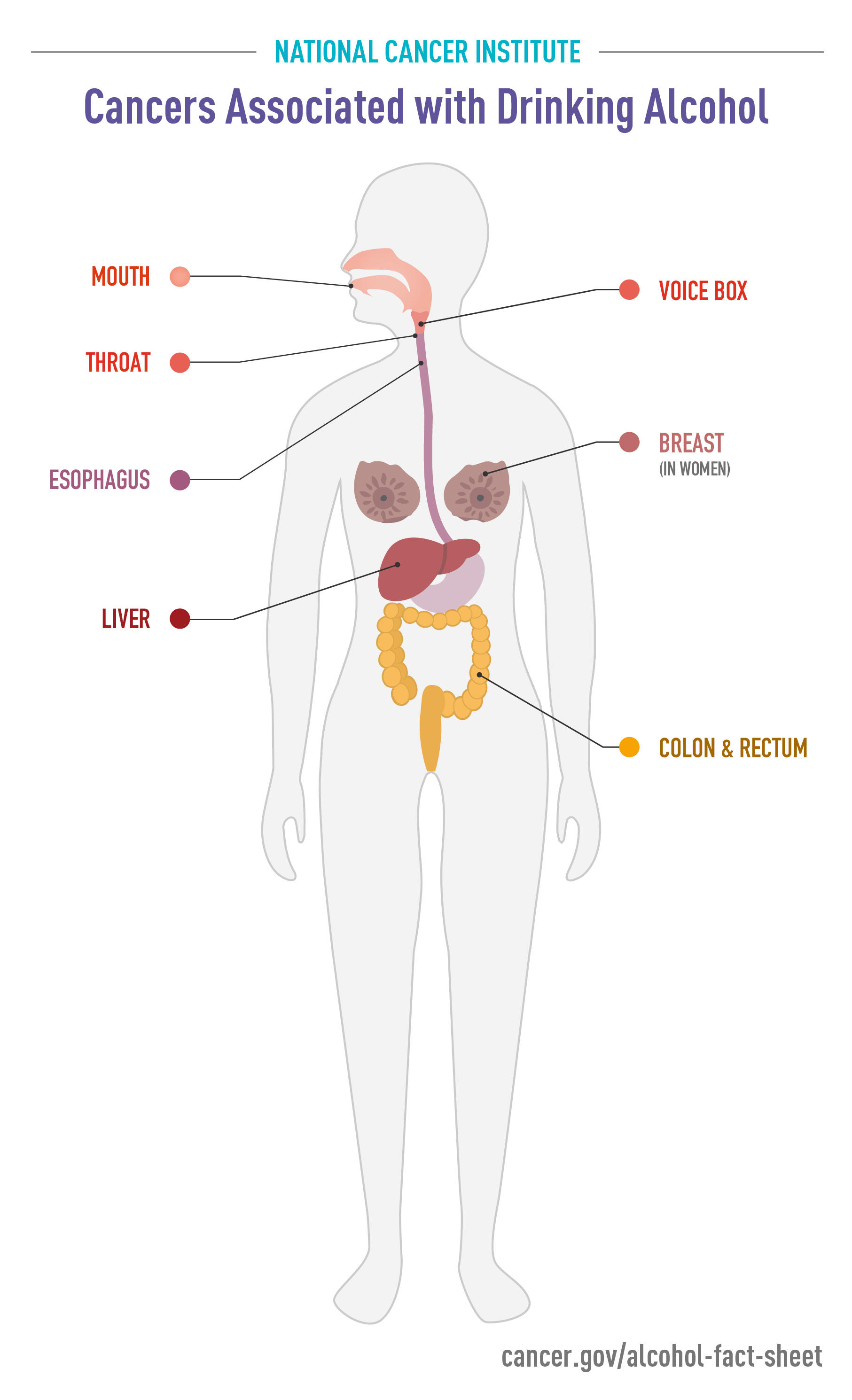

In 2025, the Surgeon General of the United States Vice Admiral Vivek Murthy called for updates to alcohol warning labels on alcoholic beverages, with the advisory noting "Alcohol is a well-established, preventable cause of cancer responsible for about 100,000 cases of cancer and 20,000 cancer deaths annually in the United States." The updates specifically concern the cancer risk associated with alcohol consumption.
