= Defective =

Defective may refer to:

- Defective matrix, in algebra
- Defective verb, in linguistics
- Defective, or haser, in Hebrew orthography, a spelling variant that does not include mater lectionis
- Something presenting an anomaly, such as a product defect, making it nonfunctional

== See also ==
- Defect (disambiguation)
