= Defect =

Defect or defects may refer to:

== Related to failure ==
- Angular defect, in geometry
- Birth defect, an abnormal condition present at birth
- Crystallographic defect, in the crystal lattice of solid materials
- Latent defect, in the law of the sale of property
- Product defect, a characteristic of a product which hinders its usability
  - Software bug, an error in computer software

== Other uses ==
- Defection, abandoning allegiance to one country for another
- The Defects, a Northern Irish punk rock band

== See also ==
- Defective (disambiguation)
- Defected Records, a music label
- Fault (disambiguation)
- Flaw (disambiguation)
