= Fault (technology) =

Abnormal condition or defect

In engineering, a fault is a defect or problem in a system that causes it to fail or act abnormally. An example of this is the Windows fault screen, commonly referred to as the Blue Screen of Death (BSoD). The system actively monitors kernel-mode components. If the system determines that safe system operation is compromised, the system halts to reduce further damage.

The ISO document 10303-226 defines fault as an abnormal condition or defect at the component, equipment, or sub-system level which may lead to a failure.

The United States Glossary of Telecommunication Terms defines fault for telecommunications as:

1. An accidental condition that causes a functional unit to fail to perform its required function. See § Random fault.
2. A defect that causes a reproducible or catastrophic malfunction. A malfunction is considered reproducible if it occurs consistently under the same circumstances. See § Systematic fault.
3. In power systems, an unintentional short circuit, or partial short circuit, between energized conductors or between an energized conductor and ground. A distinction can be made between symmetric and asymmetric faults. See Fault (power engineering).

== Random fault ==
A random fault occurs as a result of wear or other deterioration.

Since deterioration progresses somewhat randomly, predicting when a particular unit will develop a fault is not possible. However, the rate at which a particular fault occurs among a large number of units can often be predicted with significant accuracy.

Manufacturers often accept random faults as a risk if the chances are virtually negligible.

A fault can happen in virtually any object or appliance, most commonly with electronics and machinery.

For example, an Xbox 360 console will deteriorate over time due to dust buildup in the fans. This will cause the Xbox to overheat, initiate the fault, or error, and shut down the console.

== Systematic fault ==
A Systematic fault results from an error in design such that every copy has the same fault. Sometimes a systematic fault remains undetected for a long time even if many copies are in use. The fault might be triggered when conditions change and could fail in every copy at the same time.

Software can have faults, also referred to as bugs. When defining short-lived software faults, these are known as glitches. But since software cannot deteriorate, all faults are systematic.

== See also ==
- Product defect
- Reliability engineering
- Software bug
- Defect (disambiguation)
- Fault (disambiguation)
