= Northern Territories Alcohol Labels Study =

2017–2018 health research in Yukon, Canada

An infographic explaining the results of the Northern Territories Alcohol Labels Study

The Northern Territories Alcohol Labels Study (NTAL study) was a scientific experiment in Canada on the effects of alcohol warning labels. It was modified after lobbying from the alcohol industry, and later relaunched with industry-advocated experimental design changes: omitting the "Alcohol can cause cancer" label, not labelling some alcohol products, and shortening the time period (from eight to four-and-a-half months). Enough data was gathered to show that all of the labels used in the study were simple, cheap, and effective, and it recommended that they should be required worldwide.

Researchers felt that the lobbyists' changes diluted the scientific value of the study and feared the weakened study might not give clear results. While the shortened study did not provide enough evidence to answer some of the research questions, it showed that the warning labels reduced alcohol sales and consumption: remembering the labels made people more aware of the alcohol-cancer link, and that awareness made people decide to drink less. Industry interference in the study brought international attention.

In November 2017, "Alcohol can cause cancer" warning labels (and two other designs) were added to alcoholic products at the only liquor store in Whitehorse, Yukon. The study was planned to run for eight months. Alcohol industry lobbyists stopped the study after four weeks. The Association of Canadian Distillers, Beer Canada and the Canadian Vintners Association alleged that the Yukon government had no legislative authority to add the labels, and would be liable for defamation, defacement, damages (including damage to brands), and packaging trademark and copyright infringement, because the labels had been added without their consent. (Note: defamation, defacement, damages, and packaging trademark and copyright infringement, damage to brands, consent) They also claimed that the labels violated their freedom of expression. Partly because cigarette-package warning labels had already been ruled legal, these claims were not considered to have merit. Lobby groups denied threatening legal action.

John Streicker, the Yukon Minister Responsible for the Yukon Liquor Corporation, stopped the study just before Christmas. He did not believe lobbyists' claims about the medical facts and instead believed his chief medical officer of health that the labels were truthful. He stopped the study because he did not wish Yukon to risk a long and expensive lawsuit and thought leadership should be taken by the federal government after the COVID-19 pandemic. Initially, the Yukon Liquor Corporation declined to identify the lobbyists who had contacted them, but an access to information request later published e-mails between lobbyists and the Liquor Corporation.

== Study design ==
=== Background ===
The study was started by university researchers from the Canadian Institute for Substance Use Research, with support from Health Canada, Public Health Ontario, the Chief Medical Officer of Health of the Yukon Brendan Hanley, and the Yukon Liquor Corporation. In the Yukon as in most of Canada, there is an alcohol monopoly, where only the Yukon Liquor Corporation, controlled by the government, can sell alcohol as a retailer or as a distributor to licensed establishments. The Yukon Liquor Corporation was the only liquor retailer in Canada willing to take part in the study.

Erin Hobin of Public Health Ontario, a lead researcher on the study, praised the Yukon for its courage at the project launch. She said that the study's main aims were to find out whether the labels improved knowledge of health risks, or changed behaviour, and that this information could be used to develop better public health policy.

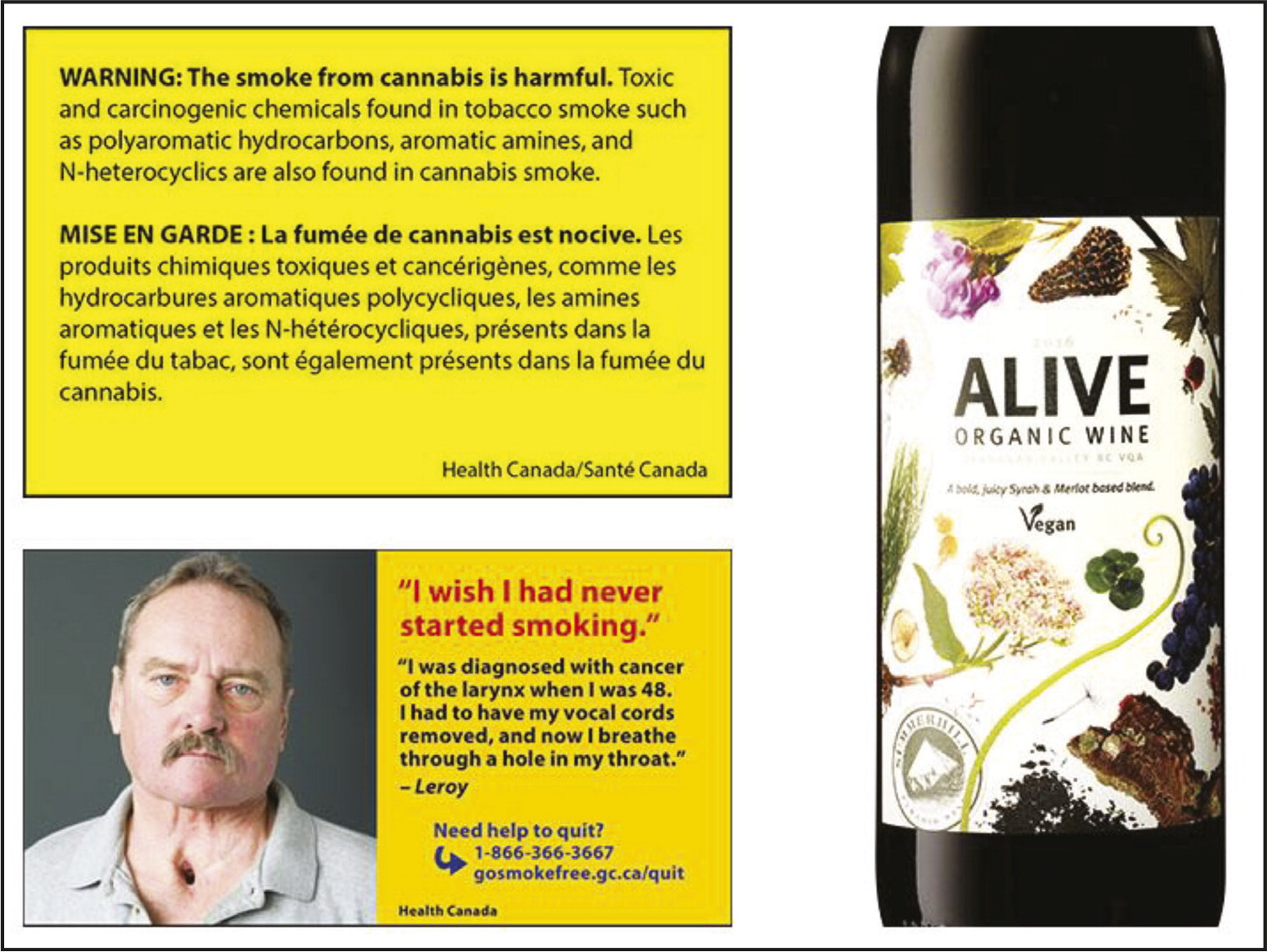
A comparison of Canada-wide labels for cannabis, tobacco, and alcohol products at the time of the study

The cancer labels were a global first. At the time of the study, South Korea warned consumers specifically about liver cancer, and allowed manufacturers to choose between three labels, one of which did not mention cancer. No other country had alcohol-cancer warning labels. Ireland introduced mandatory cancer-risk labelling in 2018, after the study was launched. As of 2020, no other countries had implemented cancer warning labels on alcohol.

As of 2020, 47 countries mandate alcohol warning labels, mostly warnings against drinking while pregnant and driving while drunk. Eight required labelling of "standard drink" serving sizes, and none mandate information on drinking guidelines, although such knowledge has been shown to reduce drinking.

The NTAL study cost CA$700,000. Despite selling alcohol, governments in Canada lose $3.7 billion net per year in healthcare costs to it. Each year, alcohol kills 18,300 Canadians and causes 105,000 hospitalizations and 700,000 emergency room visits (as of 2017). Adding government losses due to criminal justice and productivity costs raises the annual estimated loss to $16.6 billion.

Also as of 2017, Canadians spent $22.1 billion on alcohol per year: $9.2 billion on beer, $7 billion on wine, $5.1 billion on distilled spirits, and about $800 million on alcoholic ciders, coolers and other alcoholic drinks. This bought just over 229 bottles of beer, 24 bottles of wine, and 7 bottles of spirits for each Canadian who is over the legal drinking age. Over a third of drinking-age Canadians report not drinking at all in the past year (35.5% as of 2016).

Yukon is the region of Canada with the highest per-capita alcohol sales and one of the highest cancer rates. The Chief Medical Officer of Health said that, in the Yukon, alcohol use probably caused more harm than the use of any other substance, and it had comparatively high rates of alcohol-related violence. He called the NTAL study a major opportunity to fulfill the Yukon Liquor Corporation's social-responsibility mandate, because it would improve knowledge of the real-world effects of health warning labels on alcohol, making the Yukon a world leader in this research.

The intervention site (where the labels were changed) was Whitehorse, the capital of the Yukon, and the experimental control site (where nothing was supposed to change) was Yellowknife, the capital of the Northwest Territories, which similarly has a single liquor store. When interviewed in May 2017, Erin Hobin hoped to eventually expand the study to rural areas. The rural Yukon was also compared to Whitehorse.

=== Label design ===
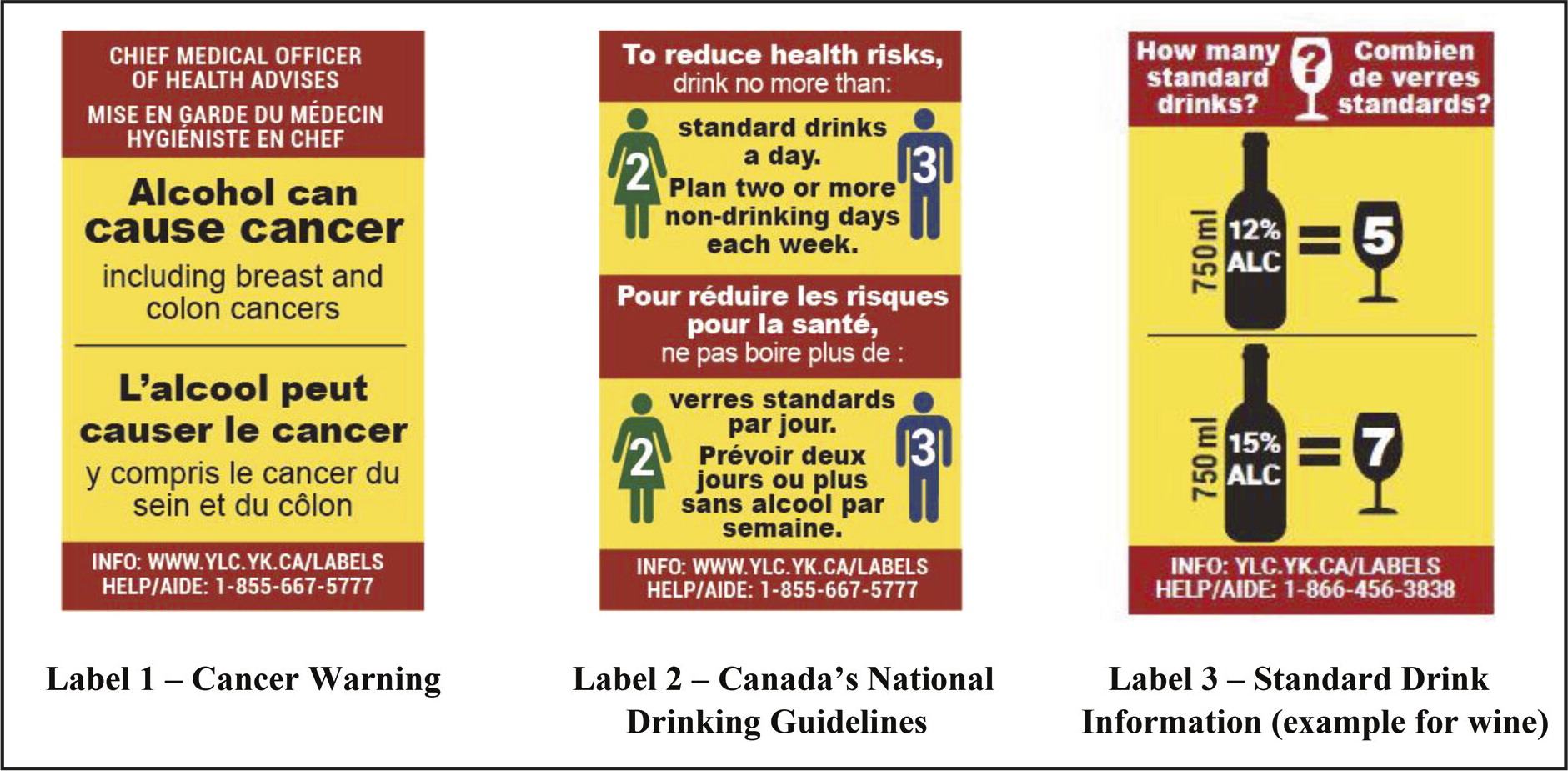
The three warning messages applied to alcohol containers as part of the study (the third label differed by product; wine-specific label shown). Over 300 000 labels were applied in the course of the study. Each label 5.0 cm x 3.2 cm (2 x 1¼ inches).

The researchers thought that past alcohol warning labels had not been very well-designed. They designed the labels used in the study to have bright, attention-getting colours, clear messages, and a "large enough font size to be actually readable". All of these factors have been shown, in lab and online studies, to make labels more effective. Three labels were planned to rotate, as this has been found to make other warning labels more noticeable than always using the same label. The number of rotating labels was later reduced to two by industry intervention. The yellow central background and red borders were intended to make them stand out in contrast to any container. Label design work lasted four years, according to Tim Stockwell, a researcher working on the study. Before the study started, consumers were surveyed, and strongly approved of putting more information on alcohol containers. Preparatory lab studies with local volunteers were used to choose the content for the labels, so that they would contain the information consumers wanted to know.

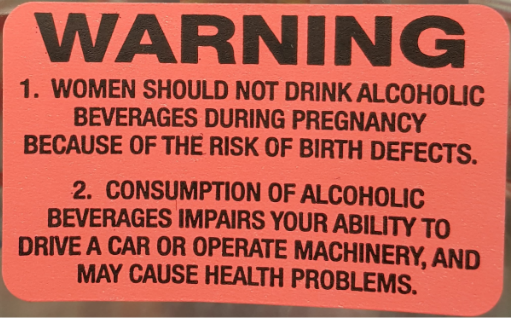
Northwest Territories label, 3x5cm
(1.2x2 inches)

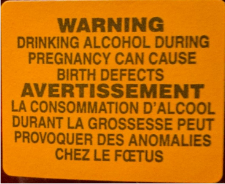
Old Yukon label, 2.3x2.8cm
(0.91x1.1 inches)

Yukon and the Northwest Territories (NWT) had both brought in mandatory small stick-on post-manufacturer labels in 1991, well before the study began (see images). Both warn against drinking during pregnancy; the NWT label also warned of impaired ability to operate machinery and unspecified health problems. No other Canadian jurisdiction had any mandated alcohol warning labels at the time.

The study's new experimental label designs were changed before the study began. The Yukon Liquor Corporation gave the researchers label-size limitations. So the fetal alcohol syndrome labels were removed when the other labels were put on, to keep the total label size down. Tim Stockwell said that the original study design had included a pregnancy warning on the experimental labels, "but the (Yukon) Liquor Corporation kept insisting that the labels should be smaller, smaller, smaller and then in two languages, and there was just no room". After the study had been cancelled, the Fetal Alcohol Syndrome Society Yukon expressed concern.

Five focus groups done in the Yukon, before the labelling phase of the study began, found strong support for warning labels, with participants focussing on consumer's right to know about health harms, including cancer and fetal alcohol syndrome. Participants also wanted standard drink (SD) information, national low-risk drinking guidelines presented as a chart with pictograms; they favoured large labels. Previous surveys generally found a majority of Canadians support alcohol warning labels, with one exception.

==== Existing labels ====
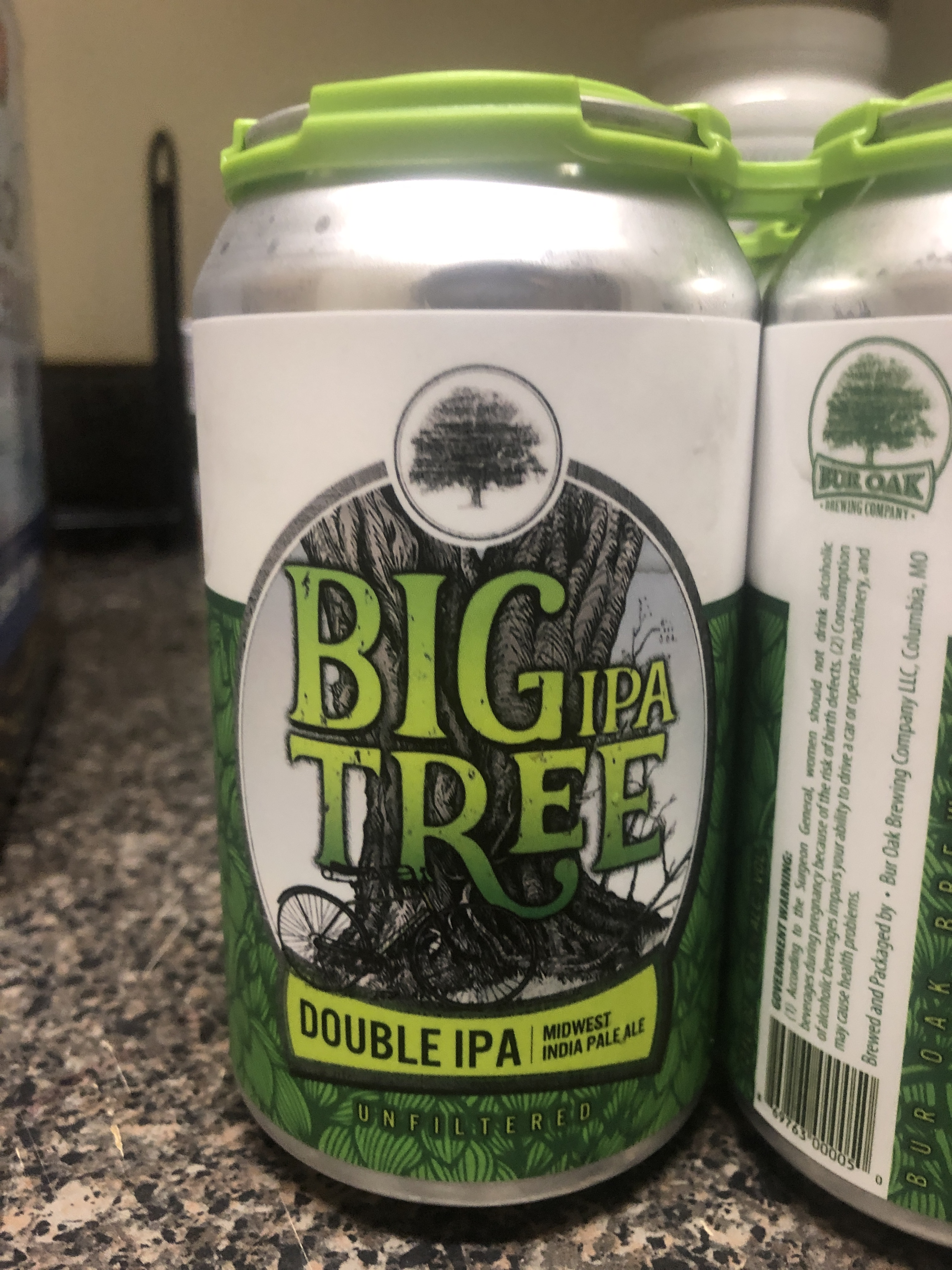
US Alcoholic Beverage Labeling Act warning on a beer can (at 90°). The small, unvarying text-based labels warn only about drinking when pregnant or operating machinery. Research evidence suggests that labels more like tobacco packaging warning messages would be significantly more effective.

While there has been a lot of research on how people react after seeing alcohol labels in lab and online studies, and what they say about their future intentions, there is much less research on how people change their behaviour in response to real-world warnings. Most of the evidence on real-world warnings is based on the small text-based labels required by the 1988 US Alcoholic Beverage Labeling Act. These labels have been widely criticized. The text is long and hard to read. It warns only about not drinking under specific circumstances, with a message about impaired driving and fetal alcohol spectrum disorders. There is only one message (not multiple messages that rotate). The text is often printed in a colour that is similar to the background colour, and the warning is often placed on the back of the container. Tim Stockwell described this evidence as "pretty moot because the labels are so bad". Research suggests that the current American fetal warnings aren't very effective. Many people don't notice them.

The messages chosen by alcohol providers as part of voluntary warning label schemes tend to be unhelpful (they are thought to be unlikely to change knowledge, intentions, or behaviour). Some may even be counterproductive; adolescents become less opposed to drunkenness when exposed to "please drink responsibly" messages.

Strong evidence that alcohol labels change behaviour in real life, as well as in the lab, makes it easier for governments to require labels. The more evidence there is that the labels will improve awareness and public health, the less likely alcohol lobbyists are to win lawsuits against the labels.

=== Other awareness measures ===
Broader awareness campaigns were planned to run during the study: in-store signage and handouts, a website, a toll-free helpline, and radio spots to augment the label messages. Industry intervention meant that the in-store and radio messaging never happened.

News coverage of industry intervention to shut down the study may have had some similar effects, effectively acting as an awareness campaign. But the news coverage affected both sites: the intervention site (where the new warning labels were added, and a new awareness campaign was planned), and the control site (where nothing was supposed to change).

== Lobbying ==
=== "Alcohol can cause cancer" label ===
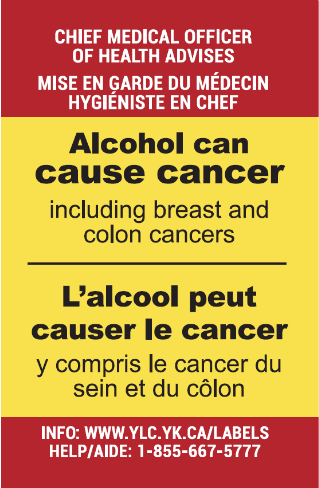
The "Alcohol can cause cancer" label, 5 cm × 3.2 cm (2.0 in × 1.3 in)

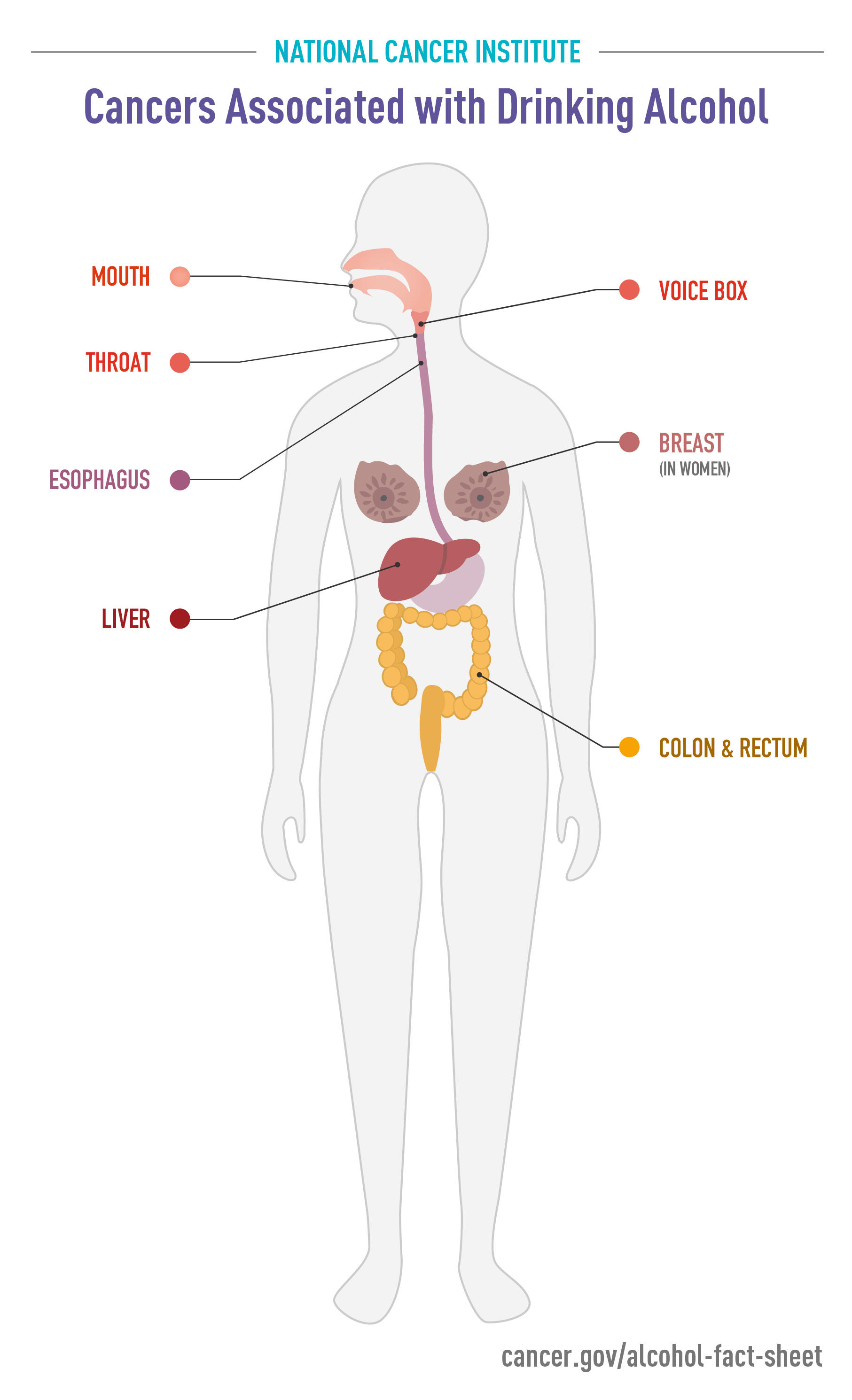
American government infographic

==== Motives for cancer warnings ====
Learning that alcohol causes cancer causes most people to strongly support putting cancer warnings on alcohol containers. Knowing makes drinkers, including heavy drinkers, decide to consume less alcohol. They also become more likely to support other alcohol-related public health measures, like minimum unit pricing.

Surveys from the 2010s and early-2020s showed that most did not know that alcohol causes cancer. Results varied by location and form of question (true/false or open-ended questions), but showed awareness generally below 50%, and sometimes below 1-in-7 (12.9%) unprompted. Less than a quarter of Yukon alcohol purchasers believed that alcohol caused cancer, when surveyed before the intervention started.

The Northern Territories Alcohol Labels (NTAL) study was the first to look at the effects of cancer warning labels in the real world, but lab and online studies have previously tested their effects. Cancer warnings have been shown to be more effective than warnings about liver damage, diabetes, mental illness and heart disease.

People seem to already know that alcohol causes liver damage; but if they learn that alcohol causes cancer, they make a decision to drink less. Learning that alcohol causes diabetes and mental illness has a weaker but similar effect. Learning that alcohol causes heart disease may or may not change drinking intentions; the evidence is mixed.

==== Industry counterstrategies ====
Major industry strategies for fighting public knowledge of the link between alcohol and cancer have been categorized as deny, distort, and distract:

- deny the link exists, or avoid mentioning it;
- distort or misrepresent the link, by stating or implying that it is complex; and
- distract: shift the discussion away from the effects on common cancers. Industry is especially keen to conceal the danger of colorectal and breast cancer.

It is common for alcohol industry spokespeople to assert that "alcohol causes cancer" statements are inaccurate, misleading, unproven, incomplete, and/or overreach. These assertions are often quoted in news media, sometimes without the context of the scientific evidence.

Industry-made public relations materials tend to have much more complex messages about alcohol and cancer. They stress that alcohol is not the only thing that causes cancer, and that there are many types of cancer which have not been linked to alcohol (also true of tobacco), and point out that it is not yet fully understood how alcohol causes cancers. These statements are true, but irrelevant. Industry materials also make or suggest untrue statements: for instance, the idea that alcohol only causes cancer in subgroups (like binge drinkers, heavy drinkers, smokers, people with nutritional deficiencies or taking HRT), or even that alcohol might protect smokers against cancer. They often incorrectly say that there is no cancer risk from light or moderate drinking. The evidence doesn't support these claims. Industry statements often mix correct and incorrect information.

==== Conflict over NTAL cancer warnings ====
In the lobbying against the NTAL study, the strongest industry objections were to the "Alcohol can cause cancer" labels. Minister John Streicker said that "I think the preference of the producers is to not have labels, period, and not to have a label study. I think I've heard that from them, but I think it's also fair to say that the thing they were most concerned about was the cancer label."

Industry representatives told media that cancer labels would hurt and disadvantage the alcohol industry, stigmatize it, and damage its reputation, often mentioning small/craft breweries and/or distilleries. The researchers acknowledged that the results of their research could be bad for alcohol sales. A few days after the labels came out, Tim Stockwell said an angry reaction from industry was only to be expected: "Nobody would want a product they make so much money from to suddenly have a label that says this can give you cancer." The modified study did find that people who had been exposed to the labels were more likely to know that alcohol causes cancer. People it surveyed also said they drank less alcohol because of the cancer warning label. Sales of products declined when the warning labels were added to them.

In this case, Beer Canada president Luke Harford wrote that "'Alcohol can cause cancer' is a false and misleading statement" and said that it was "way too complex an issue to be discussed on the label". Jan Westcott of the Association of Canadian Distillers called the cancer-risk labels "alarmist and misleading". Such claims were widely quoted in media coverage of the NTAL study, though not as widely as in media coverage of some other efforts to label alcohol.

Researchers, public health officials, and the Yukon government all strongly defended the truth of the statement. The researchers said that the fact that alcohol causes cancer has been well known to researchers since the 1990s, and would be well known to the public were it not for industry interference and obfuscation.

Alcohol industry representatives also repeatedly stated that the link between alcohol and cancer was too complex to tell the public about on a small label; this talking point has also been used in other cases. The NTAL study found that people who remembered the "Alcohol can cause cancer" label were more likely to think that alcohol could cause cancer. It did not report any evidence that people misunderstood the simple message.

Jan Westcott said that the cancer labels came off as scare messages, because people rightly "freak out" if you mention the word cancer. He said that the labels needed to mention some health benefits of alcohol. Erin Hobin disagreed, criticizing the evidence for such benefits.

Westcott later said that the Association of Canadian Distillers was not denying that "excessive" drinking could cause "certain types" of cancer, but "We're just not sure that putting the word 'cancer' on a label is the most effective way to convey that information". He suggested advertising, and retailers having conversations with consumers, instead. Typical industry-funded "public health" ads have been shown to be ineffective to counterproductive.

The BC Craft Brewers Guild wrote to the vice-president of research at the University of Victoria, saying the labels bore "false, misleading and potentially dangerous information". They asked if the study had received approval from a research ethics board (it had been approved by both the Research Ethics Board at Public Health Ontario (identification number: 2017-010.04) and the Human Research Ethics Board at the University of Victoria (Protocol 17–161), and had been given research licenses by both territorial governments).

=== Standard drink labels ===
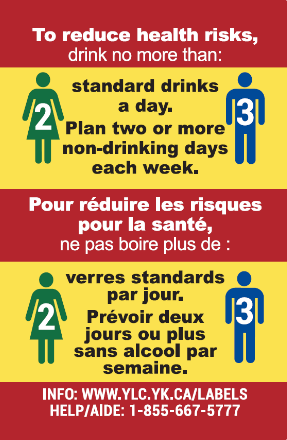
Outdated low-risk drinking guidelines label, 5.0 cm x 3.2 cm
(2 x 1¼ inches)

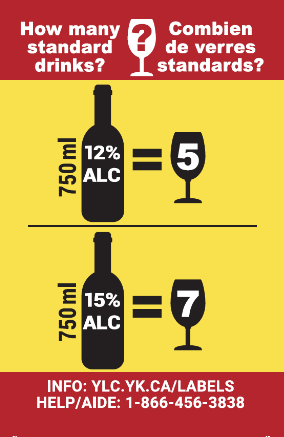
Label explaining how big a standard drink is. This label varied by product, since it says how many standard drinks are in the labelled container.

The other two labels explained how many standard drinks the labelled alcohol container contained, and gave the pre-existing Canadian reduced-risk drinking limits (in terms of numbers of standard drinks). These Canadian Centre on Substance Use and Addiction limits have since been revised downwards. As of January 2023, the CCSA says 0 drinks is safest, ≤2 drinks per week is likely lower-risk, 3-6 is increased-risk, >6 significantly increases risk, and more than two drinks per occasion is also increased-risk. While there is no safe level of alcohol consumption, drinking more is more harmful (people who drink less are healthier than those who drink more, and people who don't drink at all are healthiest). In earlier online studies, exposure to similar labels made drinkers better at estimating how much they'd drunk and how much alcohol would exceed the reduced-risk limits.

The alcohol industry in Canada once approved a national alcohol strategy that recommended contains-[number]-standard-drinks labels, but later opposed such labels. Industry lobbyists did not object to the NTAL study standard-drink labels as strongly as they did to the cancer warning, but they wanted to redesign them.

Luke Harford of Beer Canada suggested that the reduced-risk drinking guidelines might be interpreted as a safe amount to drink and drive, asking if the Yukon Liquor Corporation took legal responsibility for that, or laid it on the supplier, who had not seen the label in advance.

The standard drink labels also encourage readers to plan two or more alcohol-free days per week.

=== Legal threats from industry ===
The Association of Canadian Distillers, Beer Canada and the Canadian Vintners Association alleged that the Yukon government had no legislative authority to add the labels, and would be liable for defamation, defacement, damages (including damage to brands), and packaging trademark and copyright infringement, because the labels had been added without their consent. (Note: defamation, defacement, damages, and packaging trademark and copyright infringement, damage to brands, consent)

In interviews with the New York Times, the lobby groups denied threatening legal action, while the minister said he had stopped the study because he feared legal action. The minister said that they had had conversations around legislative authority, label placement, trademark infringement, and defamation, and "those terms leave us thinking that litigation is a real risk". The Yukon Liquor Corporation put out a written statement saying that, "the liquor industry indicated a possibility and/or likelihood of legal action", and Matt King, its president, said that the cancer labels had been removed due to "the potential for protracted litigation".

The Yukon had a population of about 40,000 people at the time of the study, and a gross domestic product of about C$3 billion (about one-seventh of the gross revenues of the alcohol industry in Canada). Researchers initially hoped that a third party might offer funding (or just advice and confidence) to allow the Yukon to fight a legal challenge, as the Bloomberg Foundation did when Uruguay faced deeper-pocketed litigation over plain packaging for tobacco.

==== Legal opinions ====
Robert Solomon, a Canadian law professor specializing in drug and alcohol policy, called the legal threats "without merit", and characterized them as an attempt to keep consumers unaware of the health costs of alcohol. He said it was clear that the Yukon government had the legal right to add the labels, because of the Supreme Court of Canada's past rulings on cigarette-package warning labels. As the warnings were neither untrue nor malicious, there was no case for defamation, and no case for forced speech. The statements were clearly attributed to the Chief Medical Officer of Health.

Robert Solomon also said that since the Yukon Liquor Corporation sells alcoholic drinks, it has a legal duty of care to warn consumers of potential risks, and "it doesn't matter if the manufacturer isn't convinced by the evidence". He also said that anyone manufacturing or supplying alcohol in Canada (such as brewers and stores selling it) have a duty to inform consumers of these risks, and the duty is stronger if the risks are not widely known to the public, the product is mass-marketed to vulnerable consumers, the harms are more severe or probable, and the product is eaten or drunk. Jacob Shelley, director of the health ethics, law and policy lab at the University of Western Ontario, agreed, and pointed out that manufacturers can make money by increasing alcohol consumption, an interest that conflicts with their legal duty to warn of its dangers. Solomon said that the provinces could also sue alcohol manufacturers for not warning, as they had previously sued tobacco companies, and a large class-action lawsuit was only a matter of time.

Solomon later co-published a paper with the NTAL study's public-health researchers, comprehensively examining and rejecting the legal threats. It disputed the idea that there was any ground for legal action, and said that the government might be at more legal risk for not warning about known dangers, but said that "given that individuals are generally permitted to sue anyone for anything, the industry could sue the Yukon government", despite the lack of merit to its case. The researchers also thought the alcohol industry, having actively intervened to conceal the health harms of their products from consumers, were opening themselves up to litigation for both the human suffering and recovery of healthcare costs.

=== Complaints about lack of prior consultation with industry ===
Lobbyists complained that they had not been consulted on or consented to the study.

These criticisms were echoed by the Yukon Liquor Corporation. When cancelling the study, it said it was unfortunate that the study "did not have the consent of label owners". John Streicker, the minister responsible for the Yukon Liquor Corporation, appeared to blame the researchers for not consulting with industry, saying "One of the things to understand first and foremost is that this is a set of researchers that approached us to do a study here in the Yukon and the Northwest Territories and we agreed... We did encourage them to talk directly with the producers and largely I want to say, we left that in their hands".

Tim Stockwell, a lead author, argued that consulting with industry would have been pointless. "Our conversation would go something like this: 'We're thinking of a study putting labels on your alcohol containers about possible health effects' ...[and] they would say, 'no, you are not going to do that — we are going to stop you, and we will use all means at our disposal to stop that information getting out'". He thought that industry lobbyists would immediately have gone to all the relevant ministers, and threats would have been made, ending the study before it could get off the drawing board. He also argued that consultation would be unethical: "We don't want to compromise the accuracy of the information that is put out to consumers because the people who are making a profit from the product are concerned". He said it would be against research ethics guidelines to discuss warning label design with people who have vested commercial interests in increasing alcohol sales.

=== Lobbyist identities and statements ===
Initially, the Yukon Liquor Corporation declined to identify the lobbyists who had contacted them.

Investigative news program The National asked Beer Canada, the Association of Canadian Distillers, and the Canadian Vintners Association if they accepted the link between alcohol and cancer, and felt a responsibility to inform consumers of the risk. All three evaded the question, speaking instead of responsibility and moderation, and Spirits Canada said that drinking alcohol had health benefits.

An access to information request by freelance journalist James Wilt, later published e-mail correspondence between the Liquor Corporation and some lobbyists (see sidebar).

Luke Harford of Beer Canada complained that beer manufacturer had not authorized the labels, and said that, "The researchers you are working with are not interested in testing their hypothesis from an objective and scientific starting point. They already know the conclusions they are going to present", citing the researchers' previous support for warning labels, and their opinions that its actions show that "the alcohol industry is itself a threat to public health". The researchers rejected these accusations; after the study had been cancelled, Tim Stockwell said, "We were accused of actually having decided what the results of our research would be in advance, which is impugning our reputation — utterly unfair. I've been put in print that at the present time there's no evidence that warning labels change behaviour. And if any study could have done this, this little study in the Yukon could have shown that in principle, there was a change in behaviour. We don't know. If we'd been able to complete the study, we'd have found out." Later, when the study results were analysed and published, Kate Vallance, another researcher, called them "a nice surprise".

Local alcohol producers also objected. The owner of the Yukon Shine Distillery, Karlo Krauzig, said he did not see why alcohol should have warning labels when other products that harm health do not, such as sugary beverages. The president of Yukon Brewing, Bob Baxter, did not think the Yukon government had the legal authority: "I mean, if I wandered down the aisle of a grocery store and started putting stickers on boxes of cereal at my own whim — I don't have the authority to do that".

John Streicker, the responsible minister, said he had spoken to national interest groups and local alcohol producers. E-mails released under an access to information request contain discussion by lobbyists of the changes to the study design that they considered necessary.

== Modified study ==
"Why is it hardly anybody knows that alcohol causes cancer [30 years after the scientific evidence was broadly accepted]? This is the reason. Because when you try and put the message out there, it's squashed."

— Tim Stockwell, a lead researcher on the study,

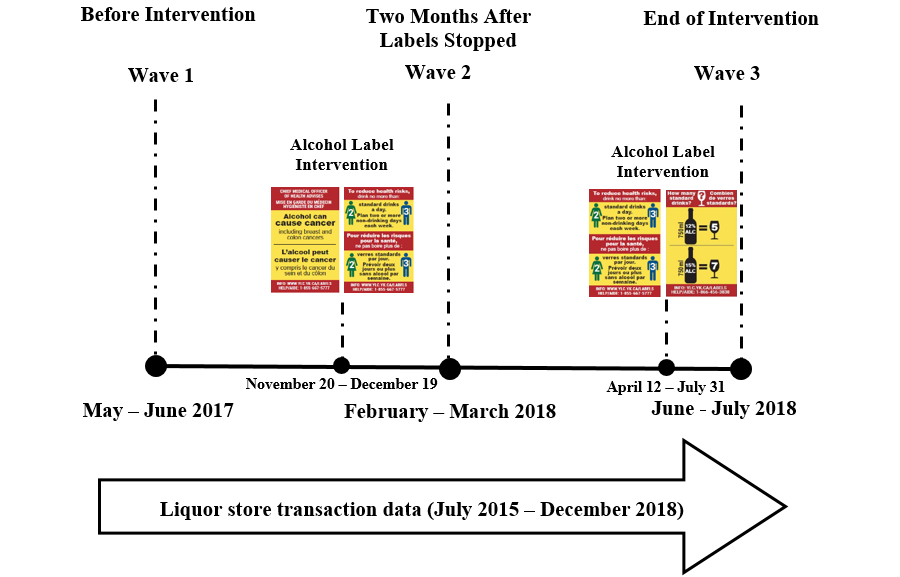
Modified alcohol label study design due to interference from Canada's alcohol industry

After the cancellation just before Christmas 2017, it was not immediately clear if the study would restart. The Irish Cancer Society and the Australian Foundation for Alcohol Research and Education said the NTAL study's halt would not stop their governments' plans to bring in mandatory warning labels.

The study was restarted four months later with the "Alcohol can cause cancer" warning labels removed from the rotation, and some alcohol products exempted. The downscaled study was no longer allowed to add labels to products from small producers (including the local alcohol producers), or to smaller containers where the label might cover the product label or trademark, or to aluminum cans or beer bottles recycled locally (concerns were raised that the warning labels might hinder recycling in ways that the product labels did not).

At the time when the study had been "paused", Jan Westcott of the Association of Canadian Distillers wrote to the Yukon Liquor Corporation (YLC): "We also confirm that, without prejudice to our views on the affixing of any labels by the YLC on our Members' products without their express authority, we would take no action in this regard should the YLC decide to continue to affix its current FASD labels" (fetal alcohol spectrum disorder labels, the warnings against drinking while pregnant). He later wrote:

We are pleased that the modified study will proceed without the alarmist and misleading "cancer" label. We understand from our conversations that the study will now use two labels, one communicating Canada's "Low-risk Drinking Guidelines" and another defining a "Standard drink". In order to minimize the risk of inadvertent trademark or other intellectual property infringement issues, we would appreciate the opportunity to review these [new] labels at the earliest opportunity.

The Yukon's Chief Medical Officer of Health, Brendan Hanley, felt strongly about the issue, and expressed himself disappointed that the cancer warning had been removed.

When the resumption of a reduced version of the study was announced, Tim Stockwell said that the "Alcohol can cause cancer" label was the most effective of the three, and eliminating it "diluted" the experiment. He also noted that the study was now shorter than planned and fewer products would be labelled, though he expressed hope that at least 70-80% of products would be labelled. He thought it was unlikely that the modified study would be powerful enough to provide clear evidence that the warning labels reduced harmful behaviour, downgrading the study to an awareness-raising exercise.

The study researchers attributed several motives to the lobbyists; one was to avoid clear study results. The researcher's goal was to determine whether a well-designed public-health campaign, including well-designed warning labels, could change behaviour, and cause people to drink less, thus reducing the health harms of alcohol. This sort of evidence that warnings are effective was (and is) important in convincing governments to bring in warning labels on nicotine products. Governments bringing in alcohol warning labels face less expensive legal battles with industry if they have stronger evidence of public health benefits.

The researchers expected that any effects would be weakened by the shortening of the study, the loss of the simplest and most effective message, "Alcohol causes cancer", the reduction of the number of different warning labels in rotation, and the cancellation of all of the aspects of the public health campaign other than the labels. Media coverage also meant that people in the control site heard about the campaign. All this made it harder for the studies to reach a clear conclusion and inform public health policy.

== Results ==
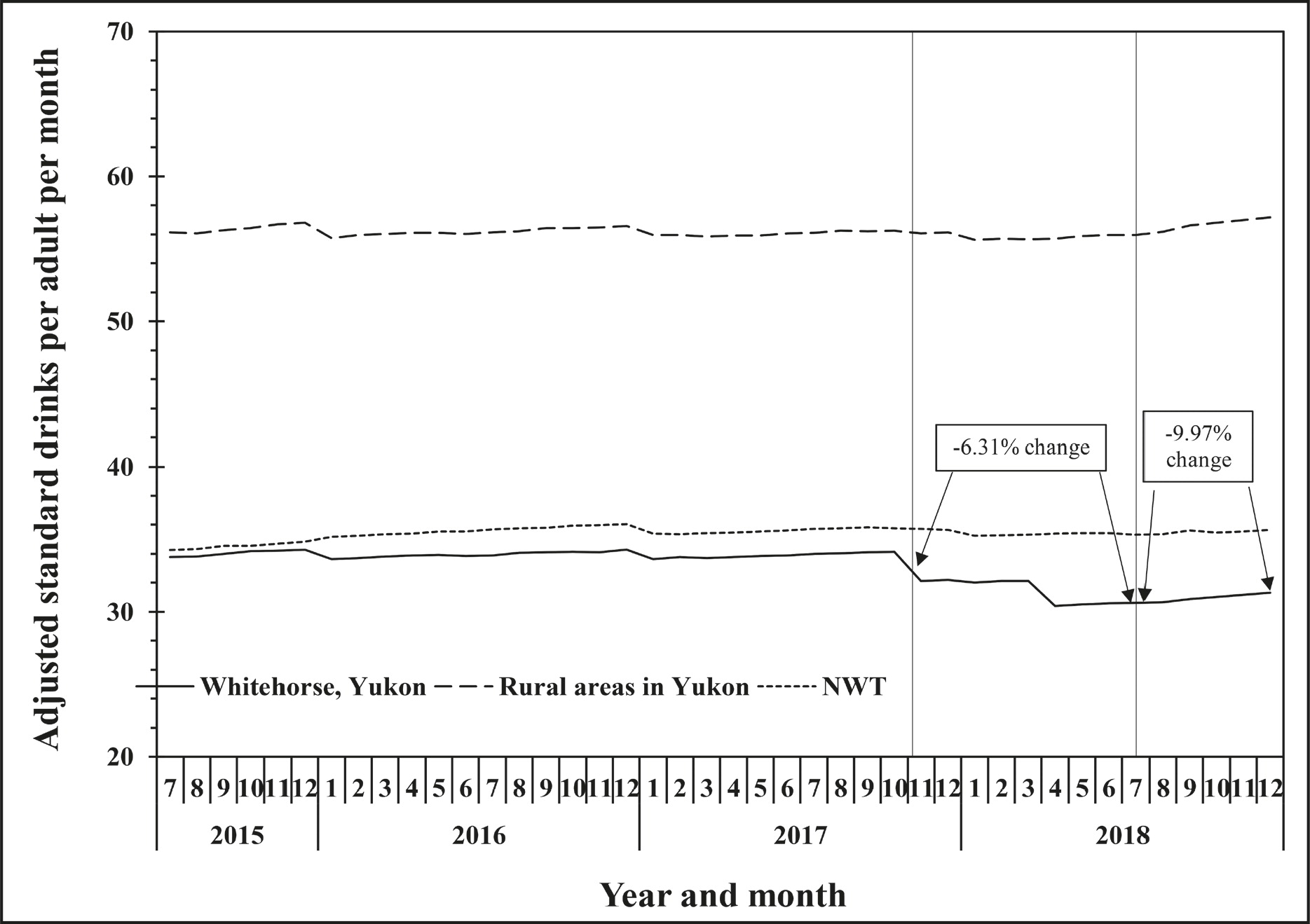
A 6.31% decrease in the per-capita alcoholic drink consumption over the period after the first month of labelling, and a 9.97% decrease after the second period in which the warning labels were present, comparing treatment and control groups and adjusting for time of year and demographics. Lines mark dates on which labels were added; when labelling stopped, some labelled products remained on the shelves until sold. Interpolation between monthly datapoints means that sales may have decreased a bit earlier or later, within the month, than is shown by the line.

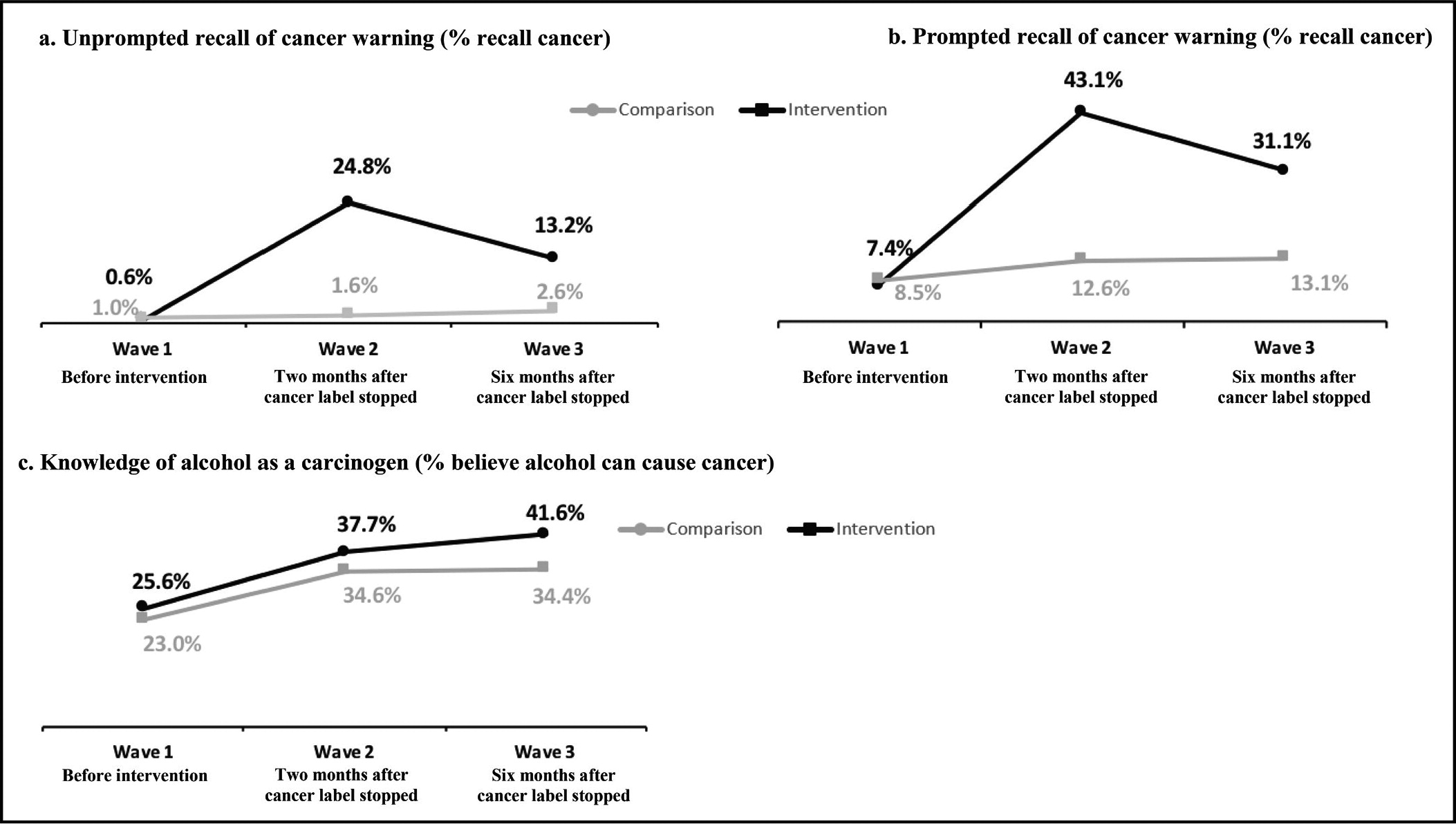
Two months after the first round of warning labels, many consumers remembered the cancer messages. The resumption of the study omitted the cancer warning labels; recall declined. 2049 people were surveyed. About half of the same consumers were deliberately followed-up and surveyed twice; the rest were new in the second survey. Researchers suspected that media coverage of the controversy around the trial increased knowledge of cancer risks in both the study area and the control area.

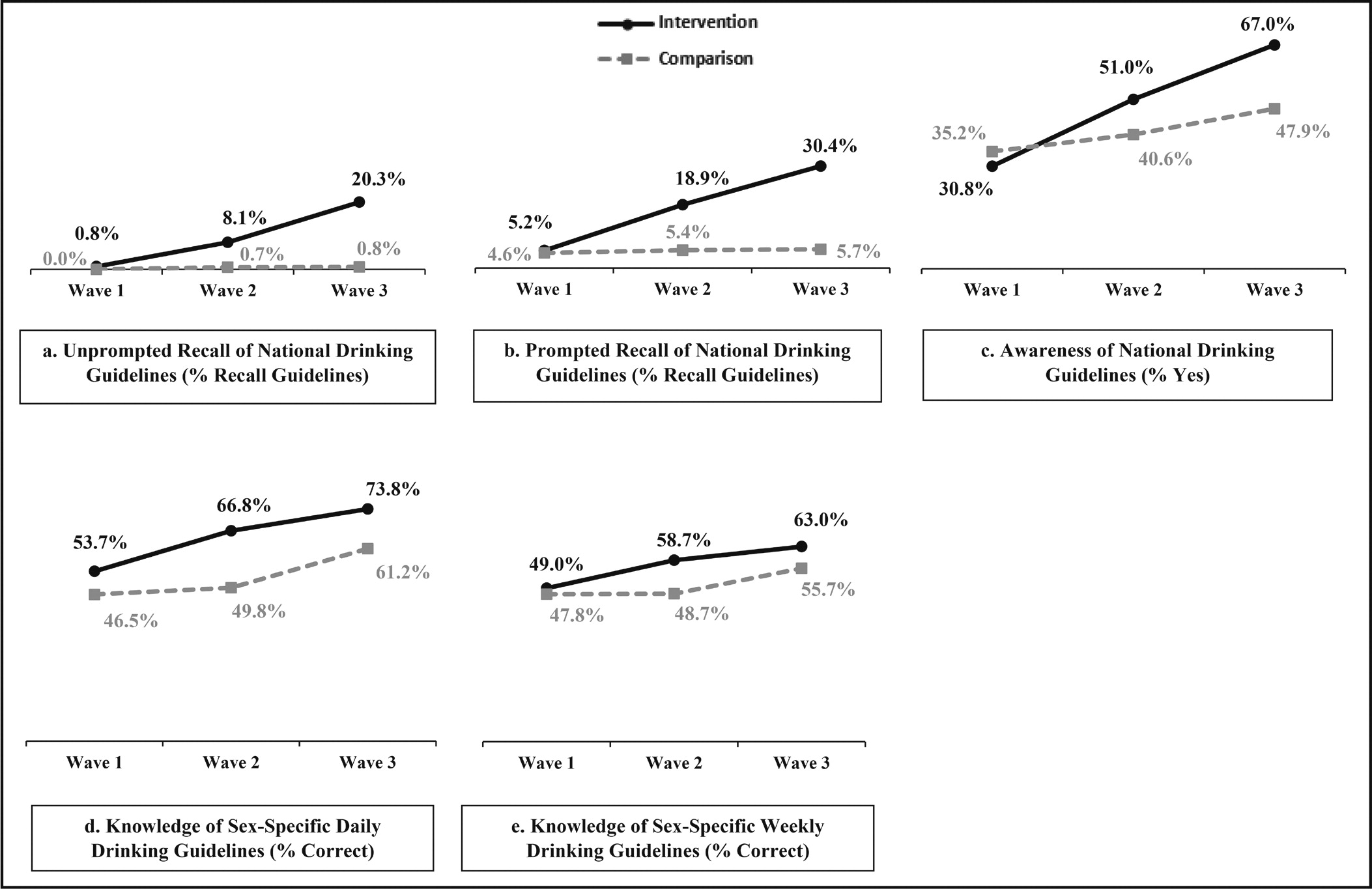
The labels may have improved knowledge of official drinking guidelines, but the result was not statistically significant.

Researchers found that consumers of alcohol at the stores generally were supportive of more warning labelling. Implementing the labels was neither difficult nor expensive.

After the study, liquor store consumers were more aware that alcohol caused cancer. Those who knew alcohol caused cancer were more likely to support alcohol reduction policies. Erin Hobin said that the study showed that the cancer warning grabbed the attention of consumers. "They read the cancer warning very closely. They thought about that message. They talked to their neighbours and their friends about that message".

Behaviourally, sales of labelled products declined; sales of the small number of unlabelled products increased drastically, but as there were not many of those, overall sales still declined. Kate Vallance pointed to this difference as additional evidence that the labels were effective.

Results for increased awareness and knowledge of drinking guidelines had large confidence intervals, and at 95% confidence intervals were not statistically significant. The shortened study and small sample sizes weakened the study's ability to find effects.

The NTAL study researchers also concluded that "additional cancer label intervention studies are required that are not compromised by industry interference".

== Reception ==
A medical review paper described the "numerous publications on the Yukon project" as "exemplary". The paper said that as of 2022, the study provided the best evidence on the effects of alcohol warning labels (AWLs): "The most compelling research to date comes from the Yukon experiment, which found that respondents increased their awareness of cancer as a risk factor when recalling the AWLs, reported drinking less after being exposed to the AWLs, and that alcohol sales declined during the intervention." The study was praised for robust label design and study design; the design was cited as a model for how to evaluate alcohol labels. It has been cited worldwide by researchers, public-health activists, and governments.

When the study results were published in 2020, John Streicker, the minister responsible for the Yukon Liquor Corporation, said the Yukon government had not yet made a decision on whether to re-introduce the cancer or reduced-risk warning labels, but that he'd read the studies, talk to the researchers, and use the results to raise the issue again with the federal government. He thought that alcohol warning labels, especially cancer labels, should be handled by the federal government. He said that the labels about low-risk drinking guidelines were of more interest to the Yukon government than the more controversial ones about cancer, implying that the guideline labels had the bigger potential for harm reduction, a view not shared by the researchers. He also argued that the effects of the labels might have been amplified by the media controversy. As of January 2023, there has not yet been action, at the federal or provincial level. Provincial liquor boards had also been slow to publicize an update to the national risk guidelines (which changed low-risk limits from 2-3 standard drinks per day, to 2 or fewer drinks per week, due to new evidence). All responsible provincial and territorial ministers were refusing to give interviews on these subjects.

In July 2020, the Canadian Centre on Substance Abuse and Addictions, with funding from Health Canada, began to revise Canada's Low-Risk Alcohol Drinking Guidelines (LRDGs), replacing them with Canada's Guidance on Alcohol and Health two and a half years later. They cited publications of the Yukon study for information on awareness of the LDGRs.

Spirits Canada remained opposed to alcohol warning labels, arguing that "warning labels have not been shown to be useful in altering consumer behaviour or reducing the amount people drink" in February 2021, months after the study results had been published.

As of February 2022, eight in ten Canadians supported adding warning labels to alcohol, according to a study led by the Canadian Cancer Society.

== Publications ==
- Fulltext of published e-mails from lobbyists:
  - obtained by FOI request "[Untitled]" (PDF). Archived from the original (PDF) on 29 October 2022.
  - sent to the University of Victoria by Ken Beattie, Executive Director, BC Craft Brewers Guild. "Dr. Tim Stockwell – Yukon / NWT Northern Territories Alcohol Study – Ethics Board Approval Inquiry" (PDF).
- Study design (see Preregistration (science))
  - Vallance, Kate; Stockwell, Timothy; Hammond, David; Shokar, Simran; Schoueri-Mychasiw, Nour; Greenfield, Thomas; McGavock, Jonathan; Zhao, Jinhui; Weerasinghe, Ashini; Hobin, Erin (10 January 2020). "Testing the Effectiveness of Enhanced Alcohol Warning Labels and Modifications Resulting From Alcohol Industry Interference in Yukon, Canada: Protocol for a Quasi-Experimental Study". JMIR Research Protocols. 9 (1) e16320. doi:10.2196/16320. PMC 6996737. PMID 31922493.
  - "Northern Territories Alcohol Labels Study". nwtspor.ca. Hotıì Ts'eeda (research support unit).
  - Hobin, Erin (5 May 2017). "Scientific Licence: Examining alcohol warning labels as a tool to increase public awareness of alcohol-related health risks and reduce alcohol intake at the population level". data.nwtresearch.com.
- Press releases
  - List of all press releases on the NTAL study, Canadian Institute for Substance Use Research. "Alcohol warning labels about cancer risk a Canadian first". Contains links to media coverage.
  - "Liquor labels caution about cancer risk". UVic.ca press release. University of Victoria. 22 November 2017. Contains media kit and sound recording of label-launch press conference at the Whitehorse liquor store.
  - "New warning labels on liquor sold in Whitehorse". Government of Yukon News Release #17-251. 22 November 2017. Archived from the original on 18 June 2019.
  - "Northern Territories Alcohol Study to resume". Government of Yukon news release 18-027. Government of Yukon. 15 February 2018. Archived from the original on 18 June 2019.
- Study results
  - University press release with links and infographics "Northern Territories Alcohol Labels Study - University of Victoria". UVic.ca.
  - Paper summarizing a number of the papers produced by the study: Babor, Thomas F. (March 2020). "The Arrogance of Power: Alcohol Industry Interference With Warning Label Research". Journal of Studies on Alcohol and Drugs. 81 (2): 222–224. doi:10.15288/jsad.2020.81.222. PMID 32359053. S2CID 218480278.
  - Vallance, K; Romanovska, I; Stockwell, T; Hammond, D; Rosella, L; Hobin, E (1 January 2018). ""We Have a Right to Know": Exploring Consumer Opinions on Content, Design and Acceptability of Enhanced Alcohol Labels". Alcohol and Alcoholism. 53 (1): 20–25. doi:10.1093/alcalc/agx068. PMID 29016716.
  - Sherk, Adam; Naimi, Timothy S.; Stockwell, Tim; Hobin, Erin (7 February 2019). "Calorie Intake from Alcohol in Canada: Why New Labelling Requirements are Necessary". Canadian Journal of Dietetic Practice and Research. 80 (3): 111–115. doi:10.3148/cjdpr-2018-046. PMID 30724112.
  - Hobin, Erin; Weerasinghe, Ashini; Vallance, Kate; Hammond, David; McGavock, Jonathan; Greenfield, Thomas K.; Schoueri-Mychasiw, Nour; Paradis, Catherine; Stockwell, Tim (March 2020). "Testing Alcohol Labels as a Tool to Communicate Cancer Risk to Drinkers: A Real-World Quasi-Experimental Study". Journal of Studies on Alcohol and Drugs. 81 (2): 249–261. doi:10.15288/jsad.2020.81.249. PMC 7201213. PMID 32359056.
  - Zhao, Jinhui; Stockwell, Tim; Vallance, Kate; Hobin, Erin (March 2020). "The Effects of Alcohol Warning Labels on Population Alcohol Consumption: An Interrupted Time Series Analysis of Alcohol Sales in Yukon, Canada". Journal of Studies on Alcohol and Drugs. 81 (2): 225–237. doi:10.15288/jsad.2020.81.225. PMID 32359054. S2CID 218481829.
  - Schoueri-Mychasiw, Nour; Weerasinghe, Ashini; Vallance, Kate; Stockwell, Tim; Zhao, Jinhui; Hammond, David; McGavock, Jonathan; Greenfield, Thomas K.; Paradis, Catherine; Hobin, Erin (March 2020). "Examining the Impact of Alcohol Labels on Awareness and Knowledge of National Drinking Guidelines: A Real-World Study in Yukon, Canada". Journal of Studies on Alcohol and Drugs. 81 (2): 262–272. doi:10.15288/jsad.2020.81.262. PMC 7201209. PMID 32359057.
  - Vallance, Kate; Vincent, Alexandria; Schoueri-Mychasiw, Nour; Stockwell, Tim; Hammond, David; Greenfield, Thomas K.; McGavock, Jonathan; Hobin, Erin (March 2020). "News Media and the Influence of the Alcohol Industry: An Analysis of Media Coverage of Alcohol Warning Labels With a Cancer Message in Canada and Ireland". Journal of Studies on Alcohol and Drugs. 81 (2): 273–283. doi:10.15288/jsad.2020.81.273. PMC 7201216. PMID 32359058.
  - Stockwell, Tim; Solomon, Robert; O'Brien, Paula; Vallance, Kate; Hobin, Erin (March 2020). "Cancer Warning Labels on Alcohol Containers: A Consumer's Right to Know, a Government's Responsibility to Inform, and an Industry's Power to Thwart". Journal of Studies on Alcohol and Drugs. 81 (2): 284–292. doi:10.15288/jsad.2020.81.284. PMID 32359059. S2CID 218481696.
  - Vallance, K; Stockwell, T; Zhao, J; Shokar, S; Schoueri-Mychasiw, N; Hammond, D; Greenfield, TK; McGavock, J; Weerasinghe, A; Hobin, E (March 2020). "Baseline Assessment of Alcohol-Related Knowledge of and Support for Alcohol Warning Labels Among Alcohol Consumers in Northern Canada and Associations With Key Sociodemographic Characteristics". Journal of Studies on Alcohol and Drugs. 81 (2): 238–248. doi:10.15288/jsad.2020.81.238. PMC 7201212. PMID 32359055.
  - Hobin, E; Shokar, S; Vallance, K; Hammond, D; McGavock, J; Greenfield, TK; Schoueri-Mychasiw, N; Paradis, C; Stockwell, T (October 2020). "Communicating risks to drinkers: testing alcohol labels with a cancer warning and national drinking guidelines in Canada". Canadian Journal of Public Health. 111 (5): 716–725. doi:10.17269/s41997-020-00320-7. PMC 7501355. PMID 32458295.
  - Weerasinghe, Ashini; Schoueri-Mychasiw, Nour; Vallance, Kate; Stockwell, Tim; Hammond, David; McGavock, Jonathan; Greenfield, Thomas K.; Paradis, Catherine; Hobin, Erin (7 January 2020). "Improving Knowledge that Alcohol Can Cause Cancer is Associated with Consumer Support for Alcohol Policies: Findings from a Real-World Alcohol Labelling Study". International Journal of Environmental Research and Public Health. 17 (2): 398. doi:10.3390/ijerph17020398. PMC 7014334. PMID 31936173.
