= World Exchange Plaza =

Coordinates: 45°25′17″N 75°41′52″W

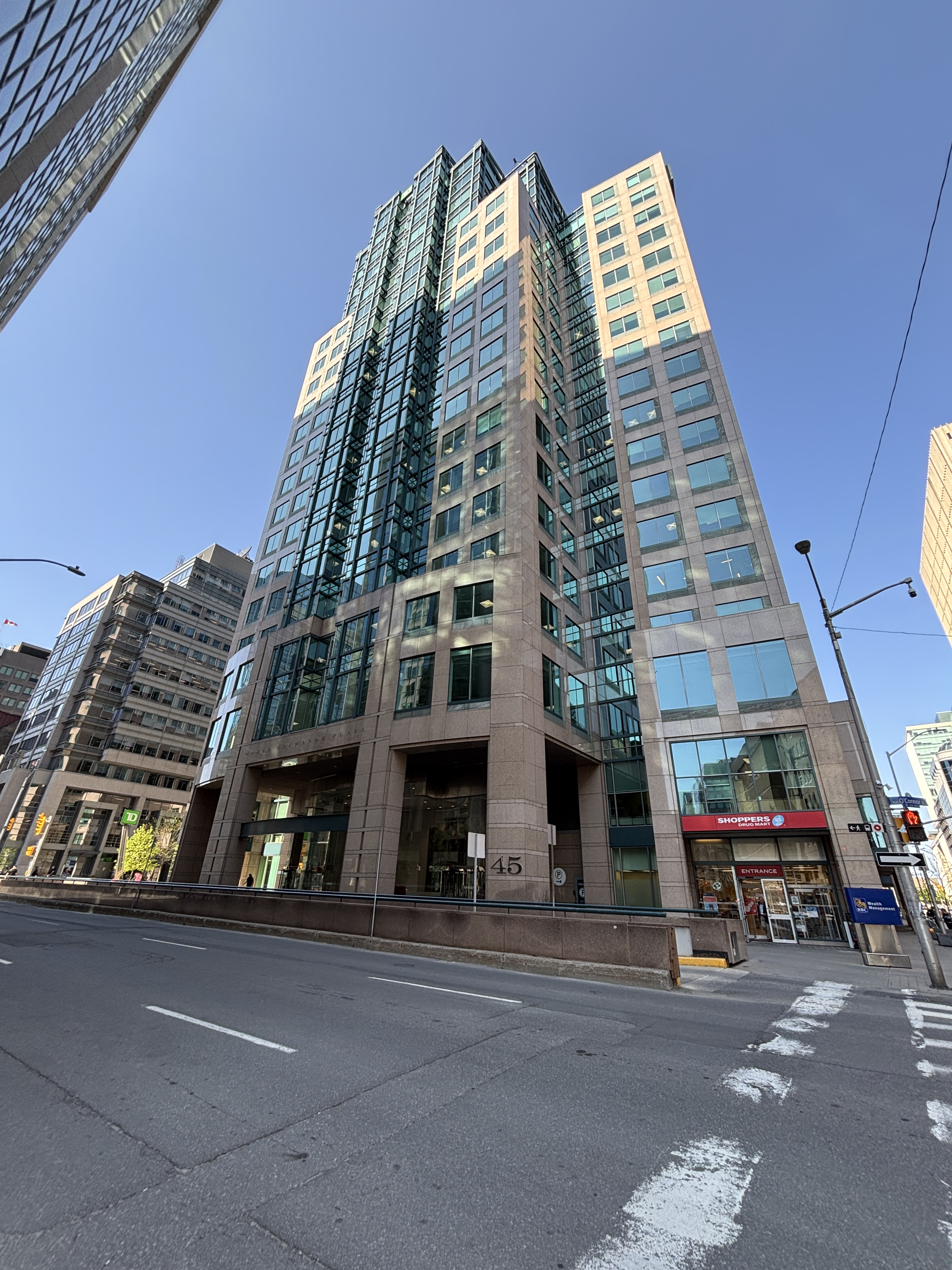
- World Exchange Plaza Tower I as seen from Albert Street
- Interactive map of the World Exchange Plaza area

General information
- Location: 45 O'Connor Street (Tower I); 100 Queen Street (Tower II); 111 Albert Street (Plaza), Ottawa, Canada
- Construction started: 1989 (Tower I); 1998 (Tower II)
- Completed: 1991 (Tower I); 2001 (Tower II)
- Opened: 1991

Height
- Height: 84 metres (276 ft) (Tower I); 70 metres (230 ft) (Tower II)

Technical details
- Floor count: 19 (Tower I); 15 (Tower II)

The World Exchange Plaza is an office and retail complex in Downtown Ottawa, Ontario, Canada. Consisting of two towers and an outdoor plaza, it covers an entire city block between Metcalfe and O'Connor Streets south of Queen and north of Albert Street.

The first phase of the project was completed in 1991. At the time, the twenty-story building was unusual in Ottawa for its visual flair. The eastern side was marked by a large plaza modeled after the Roman Colosseum. The building opened in the middle of a deep recession and initially had trouble being filled. Still, work began on a second tower, which was completed in 2001. This second tower greatly increased the available office space.

The two towers hold offices for a variety of companies, including Deloitte, Borden Ladner Gervais (BLG), CTV, Microsoft, Accenture, Norton Rose Fulbright, RBC Dominion Securities, TD Canada Trust, CPAC and Beer Canada. Atop of one tower is the TD logo and atop the other is the BLG logo. The building also houses the Embassy of Mexico to Canada.

The World Exchange Plaza contains a small shopping mall located on the ground floor. The mall featured five life-size models of narwhals and belugas that hung from the ceiling. The models were made and donated by the Canadian Museum of Nature and were unveiled on October 29, 1991, in the presence of Princess Diana. In preparation for an extensive renovation of the plaza's ground floor, the sculptures were given back to the Canadian Museum of Nature on November 10, 2021.

The complex also featured a movie theatre, the only cinema in the downtown core. The theatre was run by Cineplex Odeon from its opening in 1991 until September 30, 2005, when it was bought by Empire Theatres who operated the theatre until October 29, 2013. The theatre closed on December 29, 2013, when Landmark Cinemas was unable to renew the lease. The space was then converted into office space. On Jan 24, 2017 it was announced that Klipfolio Dashboard would become the first major tenant of this newly renovated space.

The complex is managed by QuadReal on behalf of the British Columbia Investment Management Corporation (bcIMC).

== Gallery ==
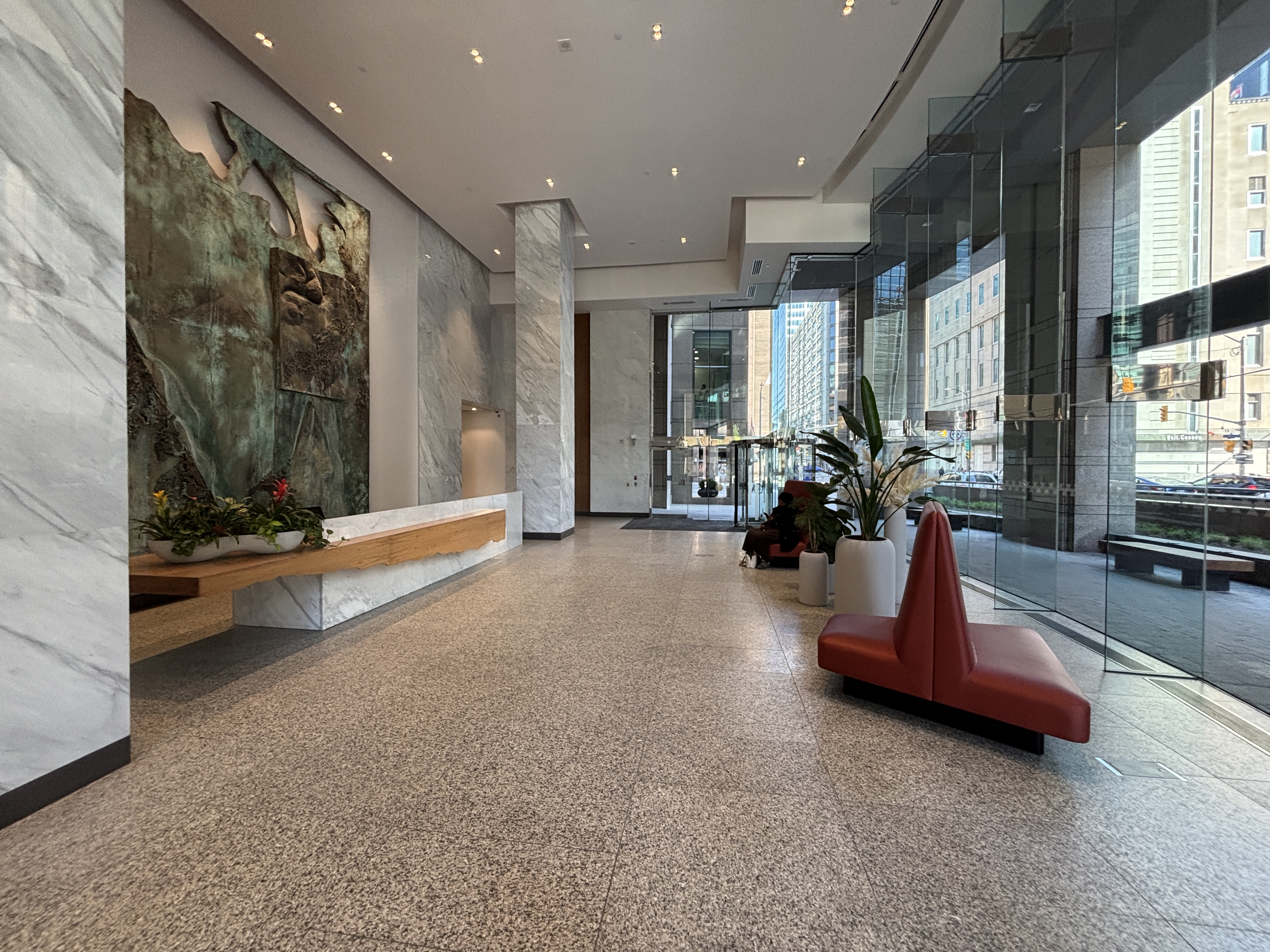
Plaza Tower I Office Lobby

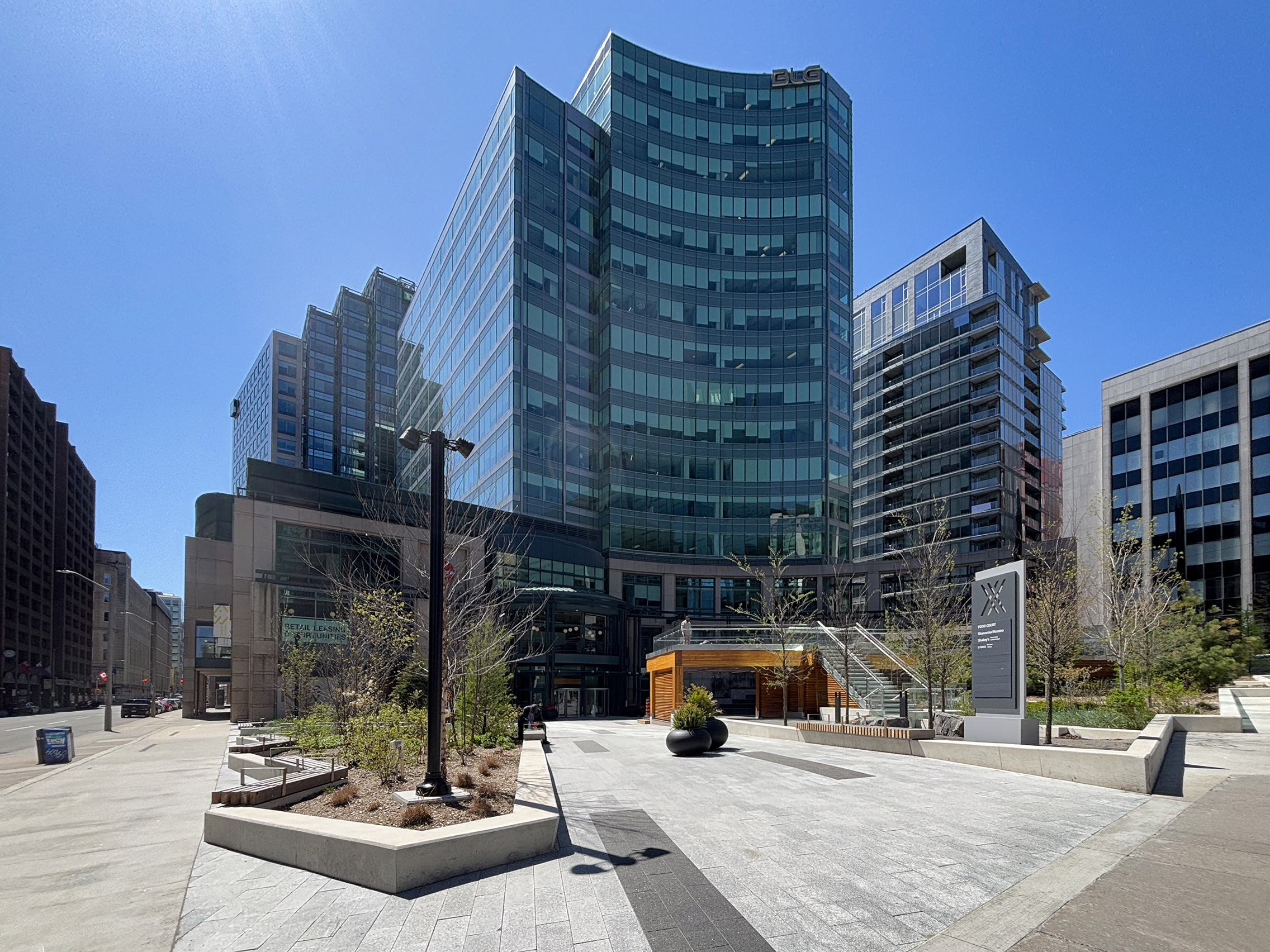
Tower II and open space

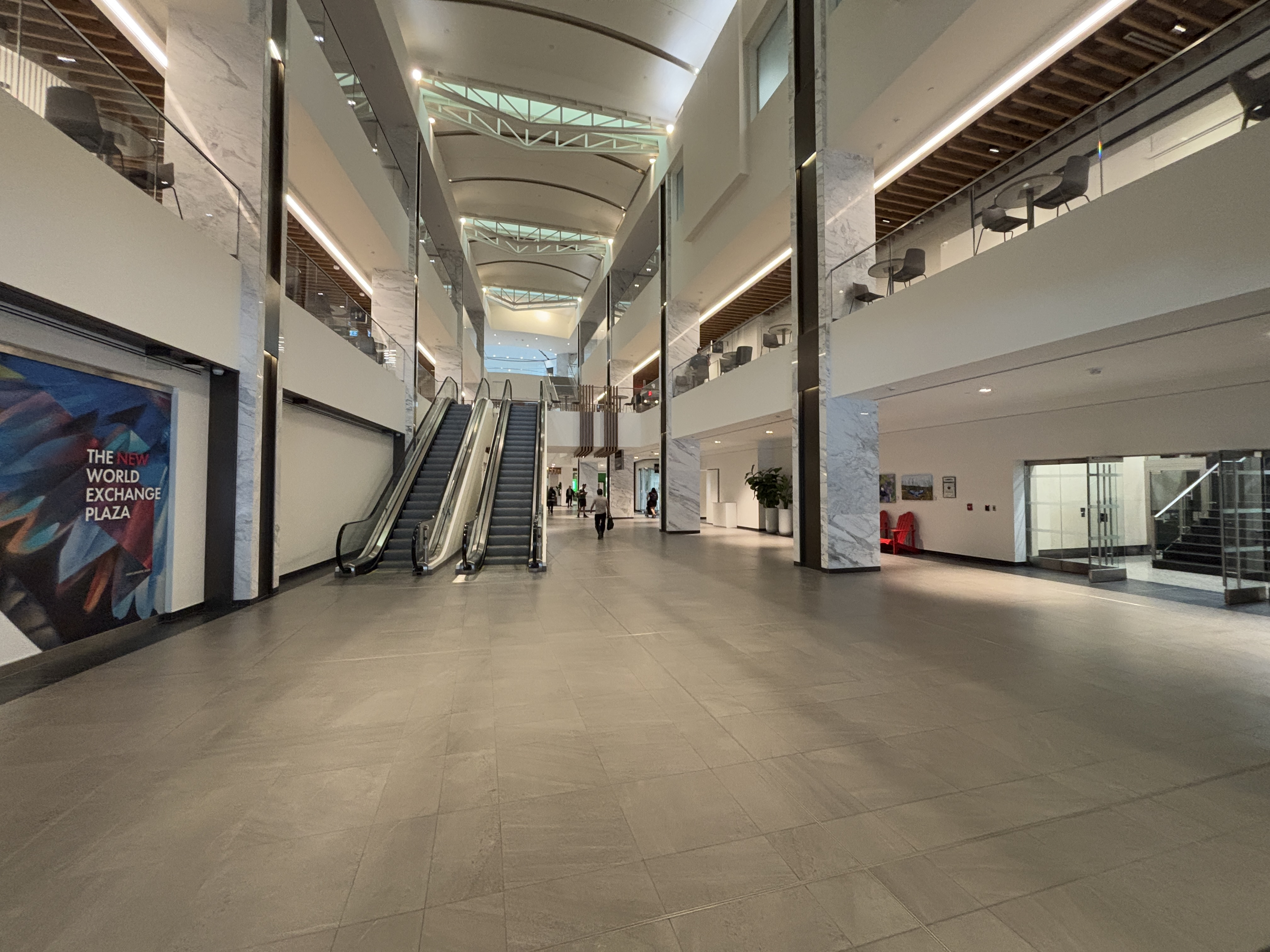
Plaza Tower shopping arcade after renovation in 2025

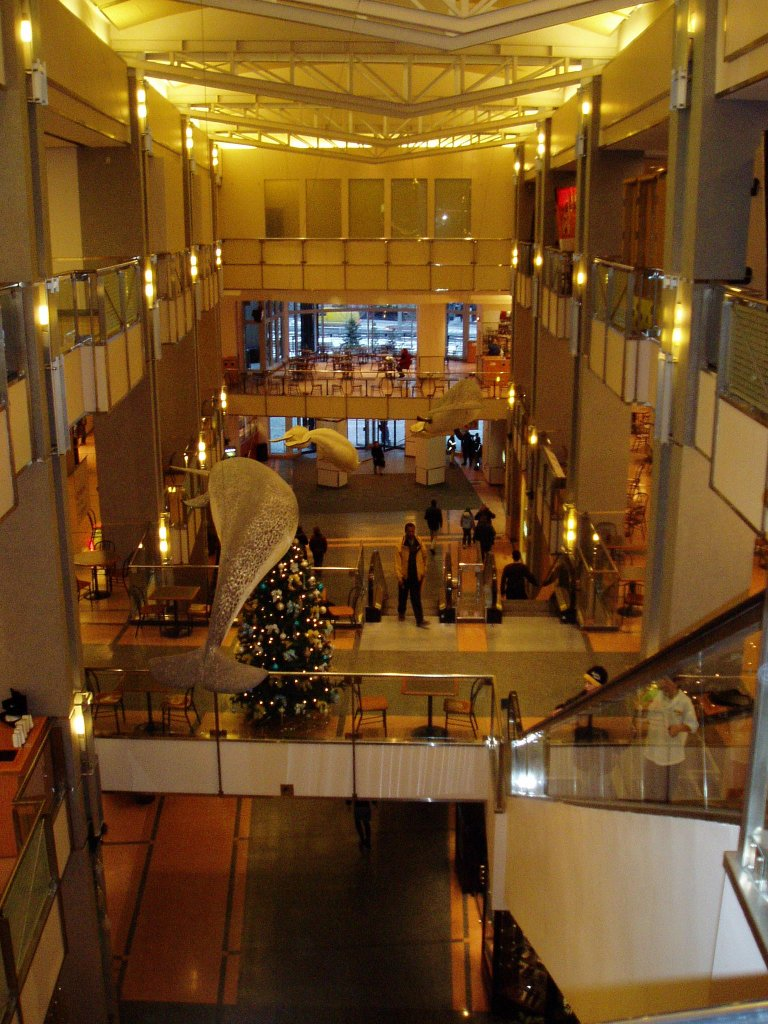
Plaza Tower shopping arcade before renovation (2004)
