= The Flaw =

The Flaw may refer to:

- The Flaw (1933 film), a British thriller film
- The Flaw (1955 film), a British crime film
- The Flaw (2011 film), a documentary/drama on the 2008 economic crisis
- The Flaws (TV series), a German physical comedy TV series (Das Manko)

== See also ==
- The Flaws, an Irish music group
- Flaw (disambiguation)
