= Blemish =

Blemish may refer to:

- Acne, skin imperfections
- Blemish (album), a 2003 album by David Sylvian

== See also ==
- Flaw (disambiguation)
- Imperfect (disambiguation)
