= James Wilt =

Freelance journalist

James Wilt is a freelance journalist and book author writing mainly about social issues. He lives in Canada.

== News journalism ==
James Wilt has a degree in journalism from Mount Royal University, Calgary, and now lives in Winnipeg.

He has written for The Globe and Mail, the Canadian Broadcasting Corporation, the National Observer (Canada), VICE Canada, DeSmog, Canadian Dimension, The Narwal, and Briarpatch. He has also done radio interviews on his work, and has written at least two books, as of 2020.

In 2022 he published an exclusive with the Globe and Mail based on lobbying e-mails he'd obtained which revealed the identities and tactics of the lobbyists who fought to stop the Northern Territories Alcohol Labels Study; they refused to comment. The lobbyists had previously denied making threats.

== Books ==
His book Do Androids Dream of Electric Cars? Public Transit in the Age of Google, Uber, and Elon Musk., was written on the publisher's request for a book-length expansion of an article he had published in Canadian Dimension. It evolved into a book on the "three revolutions" (electric cars, ride-hailing, and autonomous cars), in which he argues that they will not cure current transport problems (including indirect public subsidy of private vehicles, which he pegs at 920%), but might be applied to vastly improve public transit. He argues that the relatively high upfront cost of electric vehicles means that they are more efficient in public transit, where they are in more continuous use, rather than in private transit, where use is more occasional and they sit idle most of the time. He also contrasts democratic and corporate models of transit ownership. and looks at the effects of transit-based surveillance capitalism. Quill and Quire considered the basic assertions and critique of the three revolutions solid, and felt that the discussion of the effects of different forms of transportation on marginalized communities was stronger than some the policy suggestions, like free-to-use public transit, which it criticized as politically unfeasible. Labour / Le Travail, while generally positive, also felt that the book could have benefitted from more on the practical political difficulties of financing public transit. It describes the book as divided into three parts: historical background, transportation-affected issues ("climate, economic and racial inequality, safety and congestion, accessibility, privacy and surveillance, rural and intercity service, as well as labour unions"), and policy recommendations. In late February 2021, Elon Musk tweeted that he was reading a book and then tweeted the first half of the title.

His book Drinking Up the Revolution: How to Smash Big Alcohol and Reclaim Working-Class Joy, examines the harm inflicted by the global alcohol industry, arguing that its marketing messages exacerbate systemic inequality by shifting responsibility for its effects onto the "problem drinker", commodify emotional responses, and don't reflect historical or global reality (for instance, the fact that 43% of people globally don't consume alcohol at all). It also discusses the effects of deregulation and online delivery during the Covid-19 pandemic, and the concomitant rise is alcohol sales and alcohol-related deaths, arguing that alcohol producers are using every crisis to increase sales, especially to poorer people, and that the profit-seeking incentives make the industry intrinsically problematic. It also examines oligopoly and market concentration in the industry, and the effects of advertising spending and lobbying against regulation. The author argues that a regulated industry, with no financial incentive to increase sales, would reduce harms. He also favours the legalized use of intoxicants that have lower social harms than alcohol.

== Bibliography ==
- Wilt, James (2020). Do androids dream of electric cars?: public transit in the age of Google, Uber, and Elon Musk. Toronto, Ontario, Canada: Between the Lines Books. p. 293. ISBN 9781771134484.
- Wilt, James (2022). Drinking up the revolution: how to smash big alcohol and reclaim working-class joy. London. ISBN 9781913462765.
