= Flawed =

Flawed may refer to:

== Film and television ==
- Flawed (film), a 2010 animated film directed by Andrea Dorfman
- Flawed, a 2014 short drama with Sydney Tamiia Poitier

== Literature ==
- Flawed, a 2007 crime novel by Jo Bannister
- Flawed, a 2016 dystopian novel by Cecelia Ahern

== Music ==
- "Flawed" (song), a 2006 song by Delta Goodrem released in Japan
- "Flawed", a song by Pop Evil from the 2013 album Onyx
- "Flawed", a song by Swervedriver from the 1991 EP Sandblasted
