= Fault =

Fault commonly refers to:

- Fault (geology), planar rock fractures showing evidence of relative movement
- Fault (law), blameworthiness or responsibility

Fault(s) may also refer to:

== Arts, entertainment, and media ==
- "Fault", a song by Taproot from Welcome
- "Fault" (Law & Order: Special Victims Unit), 2006
- Faults (film), 2014

== Science and technology ==
- Fault (computing), also called a trap or an exception, a type of interrupt in software or operating systems
- Fault (technology), an abnormal condition or defect that may lead to a failure
- Electrical fault, an abnormal current

== Sport and competition ==
- Fault (breeding), an undesirable aspect of structure or appearance of an animal
- Fault, in pickleball, any infringement of the rules by a player
- Fault, in show jumping, a penalty
- Fault, in tennis jargon, a serve that fails to place a tennis ball in the correct area of play

== See also ==
- Blame
- Defect (disambiguation)
- Error
- Mistake (disambiguation)
- Software bug
