= Flawless =

Flawless may refer to:

== Film ==
- Flawless (1999 film), an American crime comedy film directed by Joel Schumacher
- Flawless (2007 film), a British crime film directed by Michael Radford
- Flawless (2018 film), an Israeli drama film directed by Tal Granit and Sharon Maymon

== Music ==
- Flawless, a 2019 album by Dree Low
- "Flawless" (Beyoncé song), 2013
- "Flawless" (The Ones song), 2001
- "Flawless" (Phife Dawg song), 2000
- "Flawless" (V.I.C. song), 2008
- "Flawless (Go to the City)", a song by George Michael, 2004
- "Flawlëss", a song by Yeat, 2022
- "Flawless", a 2014 song by MercyMe from Welcome to the New
- "Flawless", a 2013 song by Studio Killers from Studio Killers
- "Flawless", a 2013 song by The Neighbourhood from I Love You
- "Flawless", a 2017 song from My Little Pony, Friendship Is Magic
- Flawless Records, an American record label

== Other uses ==
- Flawless, a Pretty Little Liars novel by Sara Shepard
- Flawless (dance troupe), a UK street-dance group

== See also ==
- Flawlessly (1988–2002), an American Thoroughbred race horse
