= Beer Canada =

Trade association

- Type: Trade association for brewing
- Headquarters: Ottawa, Ontario, Canada
- Region served: Canada
- Chairman: Kyle Norrington
- Website: www.beercanada.com

Beer Canada is a trade association representing beer makers in Canada. In 2014, its 26 members represented 90 percent of all domestic beer brewed in Canada.

Its stated mission is to "provide thoughtful leadership and strategic focus to grow the beer category and facilitate the commercial success of Canada's brewers."

Its current Board of Directors Chairman is Frederic Landtmeters, President of Molson Coors Canada.

== Northern Territories Alcohol Labels Study shutdown ==
In 2017, Beer Canada was among those successfully lobbying and for the termination of the Northern Territories Alcohol Labels Study, which added experimental warning labels saying "Alcohol can cause cancer" to alcohol products. President Luke Harford wrote to the government Yukon Liquor Corporation that "'Alcohol can cause cancer' is a false and misleading statement". While the Yukon government thought that the threats of legal action were unfounded, they were persuaded to end the study by the risk of expensive and prolonged litigation.

The researchers disputed the idea that there was any ground for legal action, and said that the government might be at more legal risk for not warning about known health harms. In a later study report, they wrote "The fact that the industry does not believe that alcohol can cause cancer or believes that there are more effective ways of educating the public is irrelevant... Rather, the manufacturers must prove, on the balance of probabilities, that alcohol cannot cause cancer. Since the scientific literature has been interpreted by international cancer experts as providing definitive proof of alcohol's causal role, such a case could not be proven." They also found that the labels were effective. An editorial in the same journal, by an independent researcher, found that "By drawing attention to its own lobbying, the industry may have inadvertently increased public support for alcohol policies and helped to further broadcast the message that alcohol is a cause of cancer."

== Canadian Beer Day ==
In October 2019, Beer Canada initiated Canadian Beer Day, scheduled on the Wednesday before Canadian Thanksgiving.
