= Warning label =

Label on a product identifying risk of its use

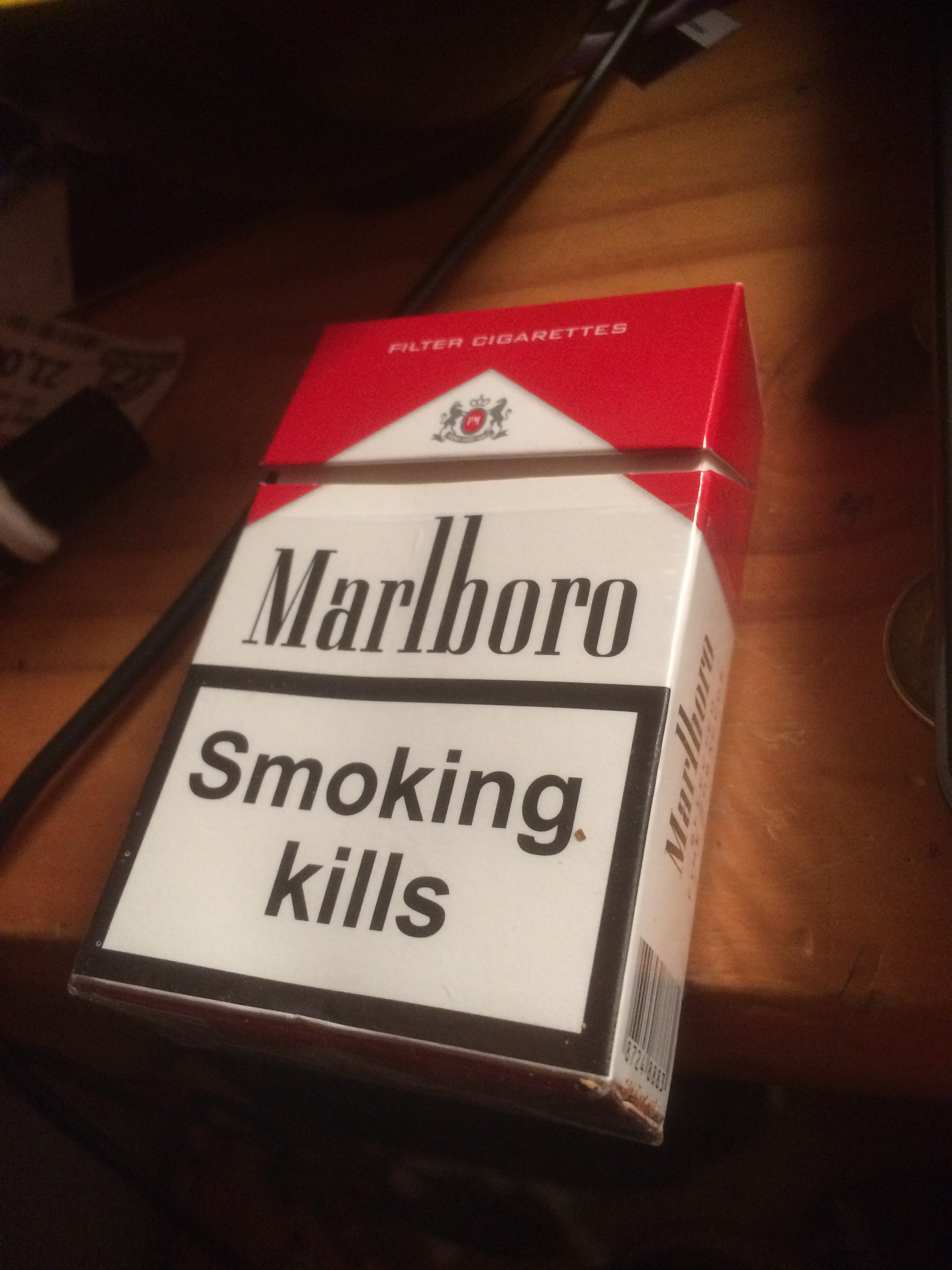
Warning label on a cigarette pack: "Smoking kills". The earliest mandatory warning labels on cigarette packaging were implemented by the United States in 1966.

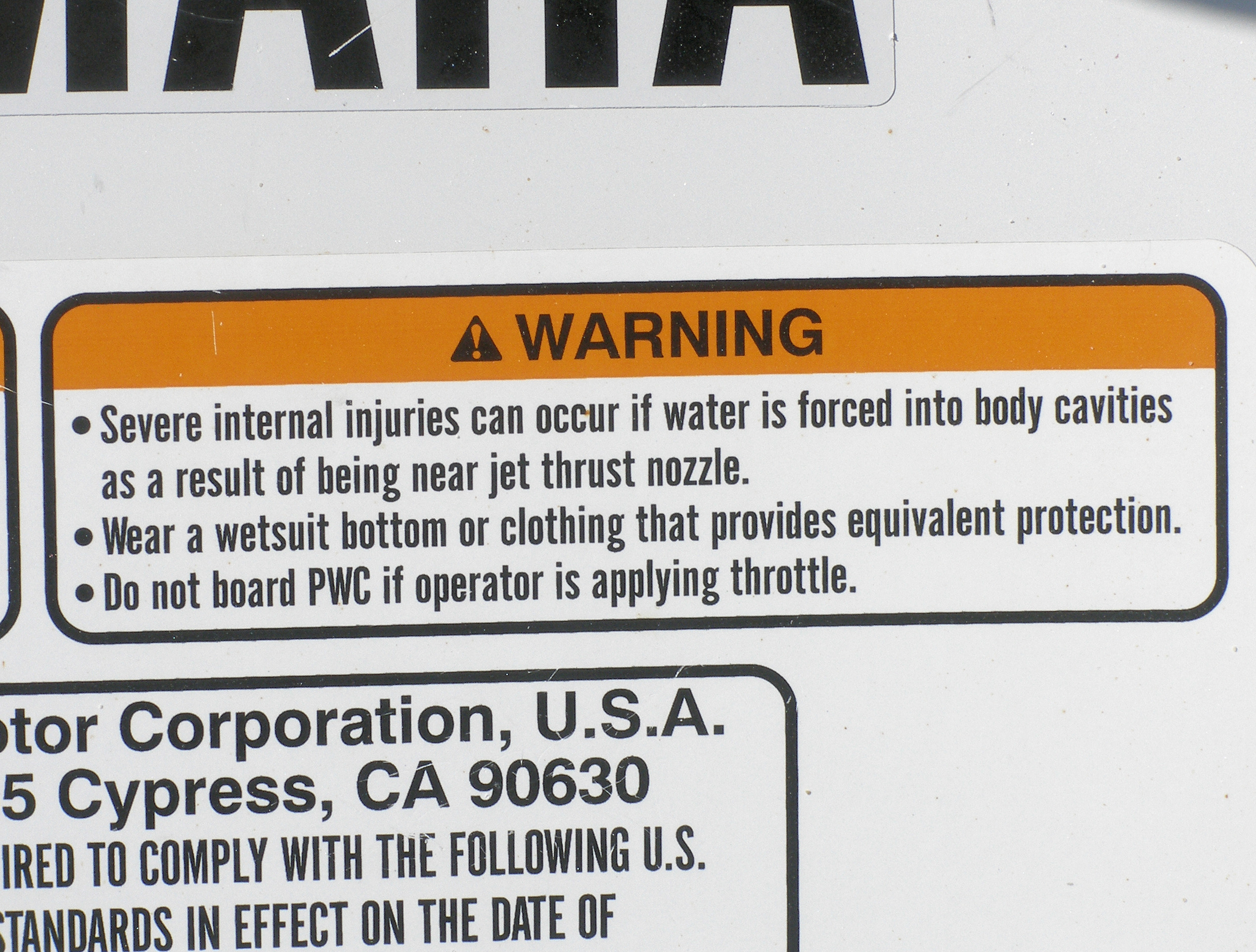
Warning label for a personal watercraft

A warning label is a label attached to a product, or contained in a product's instruction manual, warning the user about risks associated with its use, and may include restrictions by the manufacturer or seller on certain uses.

Some of them are legal requirements (such as health warnings on tobacco products). Most of them are placed to limit civil liability in lawsuits against the item's manufacturer or seller (see product liability). That sometimes results in labels which for some people seem to state the obvious.

Lack of a warning label can become an informational defect, which is a type of product defect.

Warning labels are found on various product packagings, such as chemicals (flammable, pesticide, poisons, etc.), batteries, tobacco, alcohol and other unhealthy foods.

== Effectiveness ==
Warning label for toxic chemicals

Warning systems promote attention, comprehension, and protective behavior. Research confirms that well-designed warnings based on scientific principles improve safety behavior, with effective warnings leading to greater compliance than their absence. However, not all research finds a direct correlation between warning design and safety outcomes due to methodological differences (e.g., user population, context of use). Some studies suggest that prior benign experiences or high compliance costs may reduce warning effectiveness, emphasizing the need for more forceful design strategies. Comprehensive reviews of the literature indicate that the most reliable indicators of warning effectiveness are comprehension and behavioral compliance.

Meta-analytic reviews concluded that warnings increase safe behavior, stressing the need for testing with representative user groups. They found that the most effective strategy for boosting compliance is presenting uncluttered, task-integrated warnings in highly salient locations.

== Regulation by country ==
=== European Economic Area ===
In the European Economic Area, a product containing hazardous mixtures must have a unique formula identifier (UFI) code. This is not a warning label per se, but a code that helps poison control centres identify the exact formula of a hazardous product.

=== United States ===
The American National Standard Institute (ANSI) develops a wide range of industry voluntary standards. The ANSI Z535 Committee develops a set of standards for the design, application, and use of signs, colors and symbols intended to identify and warn against specific hazards and for other accident prevention purposes. The ANSI standards were developed to standardize warning systems content and format. They are informed by scientific input to maximize message recognition and comprehension with the aim of improving warning system effectiveness. The two standards most relevant to consumer product hazard signs are ANSI Z535.4: Product Safety Signs and Labels and ANSI Z535.6: Product Safety Information in Product Manuals, Instructions, and Other Collateral Materials. Studies indicate that warnings that were consistent with the ANSI Z535 standard were rated as being more noticed, read, and understood and they promoted greater compliance in comparison with warnings that were inconsistent with the standard.

In the United States, warning labels have been mandated under a number of different government organizations. For instance, the Federal Food, Drug, and Cosmetic Act of 1938. Cigarettes were not required to have warning labels in the United States until Congress passed the Federal Cigarette Labeling and Advertising Act (FCLAA) in 1965 (in force in 1966).

Other organizations that create label standards in the US — the Occupational Safety and Health Administration (OSHA) and American National Standards Institute (ANSI) — govern their use. The US organizations pull from international organizations such as the Globally Harmonized System of Classification and Labelling of Chemicals and the International Standards Organization.

== Chemical hazard level warning labels ==
In the United States or elsewhere, the terms Danger, Warning and Caution are regulated by the Globally Harmonized System of Classification and Labelling of Chemicals (GHS) ANSI Z535. Graphic symbols are regulated by ISO 7010.

Term	Hazard	Meaning	Usage
Danger!	Highest level	Indicates severe injury or death certain to occur if not avoided.	Reserved for the most severe situations, often accompanied by symbols or pictograms that are universally recognized to quickly convey the risks involved even if the language is not recognized by the viewer.
Warning!	Medium level	There is a potential hazard that could result in serious injury or death but is less immediate or severe or probable than those marked with "Danger."	Signals a need for caution and awareness of the potential risks, and, like "Danger," is often paired with symbols to facilitate quick recognition.
Caution!	Lowest level	There is a potential hazard that could result in minor or moderate injury, or there is a risk of property damage.	Used in situations where the risks do not typically result in serious injury or death but where attention and care are still required. It advises individuals to proceed with caution to prevent accidents.

== See also ==
- Alcohol packaging warning messages
- California Proposition 65 (1986)
- Black box warnings mandated by the US Food and Drug Administration
- Globally Harmonized System of Classification and Labelling of Chemicals
- Tobacco packaging warning messages
- Hazard symbol
- List of food labeling regulations
- Nutri-Score
