= Latent defect =

Concept in property law

In the law of the sale of property (both real estate and personal property or chattels) a latent defect is a fault in the property that could not have been discovered by a reasonably thorough inspection before the sale. In relation to a construction contract, a latent defect is a fault in the property or its underlying site which comes to light after construction has been completed.

== Sale of a property ==
The general law of the sale of property is caveat emptor (let the buyer beware) and buyers are under a general duty to inspect their purchase before taking possession. However, it is understood at law that inspection is often not sufficient to detect certain deficiencies in the product that can only be discovered through destructive testing or other means that a seller could not reasonably be expected to allow under normal conditions. For example, wood beams and interior brickwork often cannot be fully assessed without destructive testing, and it would be unreasonable for the seller to allow the buyer to destroy part of the property in order to discover such defects.

As such, the law expects that buyers will protect themselves in the sales contract against defects they cannot possibly be expected to assess prior to purchase. As such, the term "latent defect" is often used as part of the guarantee clauses in a sales contract so that the buyer can recover damages from the seller if defects turn up in the property after the sale. For example, the seller may be required to pay for repairs of any such damage.

Under common law, there is no automatic right for a buyer to claim against a seller for such latent defects when they are discovered, absent an agreement in contract. Civil law in some jurisdictions (Quebec, Canada) does provide for such an automatic right unless a property is sold "without guarantee" as to its quality. However, if a latent defect is discovered, there is often a presumption against the seller when a claim is made in misrepresentation that the seller knew about the latent defect. As such, the seller is required to show that he or she could not possibly have known of the defect, rather than the buyer having to show that the seller did know about the defect. However, if it can be shown the seller could not have known about the defect (and was not wilfully blind to the possibility) then the buyer's claim will not succeed.

However, when the defect could have been discovered by the buyer by a thorough inspection (a "patent defect"), the buyer cannot possibly succeed in a claim against the seller unless the seller actively took steps to hide the defect from a normal inspection.

In all cases, where a seller actively misrepresents the condition of the property, such as by taking steps to make an inspection impossible or by lying about problems when directly asked, the buyer will almost always succeed unless it can be shown that the buyer was independently aware of the defect and completed the transaction nevertheless.

== Construction ==
In construction contracting, a latent defect is defined as a defect which exists at the time of acceptance but cannot be discovered by a reasonable inspection.

In the 1864 US case of Dermott v Jones, the latent defect lay in the soil on which a property had been built, giving rise to problems which subsequently made the house "uninhabitable and dangerous".

== See also ==
- As is
