= Yukon Liquor Corporation =

Territorial alcohol regulator in Yukon, Canada

Yukon Liquor Corporation _{Société des alcools du Yukon (French)}
- Company type: Crown Corporation
- Industry: Beverages
- Founded: Whitehorse (1977)
- Headquarters: Whitehorse, Yukon
- Key people: Wayne Cousins, Chair
- Products: Alcoholic beverages
- Website: Yukon Liquor Corporation

The Yukon Liquor Corporation regulates the distribution, purchase and sale of alcoholic beverages in the Canadian territory of Yukon and the distribution, purchase and sale of cannabis in Yukon.

The Corporation came into existence in 1977 as a result of amendments to the Liquor Act. It currently operates six liquor stores and a central facility in Whitehorse.

Between November and December in 2017, the Corporation put warning labels related to the consequences of drinking alcohol on its alcohol products as part of a research experiment in researching how to reduce alcohol consumption. According to the researchers, the experiment was successful in reducing alcohol sales.
