= Product defect =

Characteristic of a product which hinders its usability

A product defect is any characteristic of a product which hinders its usability for the purpose for which it was designed and manufactured.

Product defects arise most prominently in legal contexts regarding product safety, where the term is applied to "anything that renders the product not reasonably safe". The field of law that addresses injuries caused by defective products is called product liability.

A wide range of circumstances can render a product defective. The product may have a design defect or design flaw, resulting from the product having been poorly designed or tested, so that the design itself yields a product that can not perform its desired function. Even if the design is correct, the product may have a manufacturing defect if it was incorrectly manufactured, for example if the wrong materials are used. A product may also be considered legally defective if it lacks appropriate instructions for its use, or appropriate warnings of dangers accompanying normal use or misuse of the product.

Depending on the given jurisdiction, the failure of a consumer to read the available warnings may negate causation for purposes of a defective or inadequate warning claim in a product liability suit.

A product that is defective in some way that does not render it dangerous might still be sold, with a discounted price reflecting the defect. For example, where a clothing manufacturer's inspection discovers that a line of shirts have been made with slightly uneven sleeves, the manufacturer may choose to sell these shirts at a discount, often through an outlet store and with the label cut off to indicate that the quality is not intended to reflect on the brand. For some products, rework is appropriate.

== Product quality risk in supply chain ==
Product quality risk in supply chain focuses on the quality problems in the supply chain context rather in the manufacturing quality context. Tse and Tan (2009) identified the concept of "Product Quality Risk in Supply Chain" (PQR) as:

Inherent quality problems (i.e. raw materials / ingredients / production / logistics / packaging) in any of the supply members trigger a domino effect that spread through a multi-tier supply network. For this reason, it is hard for a network member to keep track of who did what, and when, to the final quality of the products. The product that a focal firm sells to the consumer comprises components made by the focal firm and the suppliers. When the product breaks down due to defects in either the firm’s component or the supplier’s component, the firm has to bear the consequences.

=== In practice ===
Product quality risk is an inherent part of the supply chain risks, with a tendency to comprise some or all of the risk elements, such as operational risk, disruption risk and reputational risk. For example, when lead was found in Mattel's toys, it tarnished the company's reputation, and disrupted the supply of its products in the market.

In the literature, the concept of product quality risk has not been fully investigated. Although Zsidisin stated that quality risk includes the risk of producing unsafe products that can harm the consumer, even when these defects are caused by another firm or inherited from a sub-contractor. However, neither PQR nor its domino effect in the supply chain have been thoroughly studied.

The product quality risk in global supply chain concept, though similar to "product harm crisis" (defined as defective or dangerous products) and "moral hazard problem" (defined as the outcome of asymmetric information, imperfect observability in supplier's quality), are not about the risk of product quality in a global supply chain context.

=== In construction ===
In construction, defects include aspects of the constructed works which are not in accordance with the scope of the project (the work which the contractor was asked to undertake) or, where the contractor has designed the work, the construction not compliant with any applicable law or with a design for the work offered by the contractor and accepted by the client or on the client's behalf. They may be "patent defects", observable in practice during or on completion of the construction process, or "latent defects", which are not visible or identifiable until a later date.

Under common law, a defect which results from the contractor's breach of contract should be put right by the client, who then sues the contractor for the costs of doing so. The NEC Engineering and Construction contract, a standard form of contract widely used in the construction industry, allows the contractor to rectify a defect at their own expense in place of the common law position, and obliges the client to allow the contractor appropriate access to undertake the rectification work. At the end of an agreed period, a defects certificate may be issued, which is intended either to certify that there are no patent defects, or to state any defects which remain outstanding.

== See also ==
- Product recall
