= Pediatrics (disambiguation) =

Pediatrics is the branch of medicine that involves the medical care of infants, children, etc.

Pediatric or pediatrics also might refer to:

== Journals ==
- Pediatrics (journal), a monthly medical journal
- The Journal of Pediatrics, a medical journal that covers all aspects of pediatrics
- Pediatrics International, an academic journal for pediatrics
- JAMA Pediatrics, a journal published by the American Medical Association
- European Journal of Pediatrics, a monthly peer-reviewed medical journal of pediatrics
- Clinical Pediatrics, a peer-reviewed medical journal of pediatrics
- The Turkish Journal of Pediatrics, a peer-reviewed nursing journal published bimonthly

== Associations ==
- American Academy of Pediatrics, a professional association of pediatricians
- American Board of Pediatrics, one of the 24 certifying boards of the American Board of Medical Specialties
- Indian Academy of Pediatrics, an association of Indian pediatrician
- European Academy of Paediatrics a European professional association for pediatricians
- American Osteopathic Board of Pediatrics, an organization that provides board certification

== Symthoms ==
- Pediatric narcolepsy, a condition of narcolepsy during childhood and adolescence
- Pediatric stroke, a type of stroke
- Pediatric ependymoma

== Medical fields ==
- Pediatric endocrinology, a medical subspecialty dealing with disorders of the endocrine glands
- Pediatric nursing, a part of the nursing profession
- Pediatric dentistry, a branch of dentistry dealing with children
- Pediatric psychology, the study of the psychological aspects of physical illness, injuries, etc.
- Pediatric neuropsychology, a study of clinical neuropsychology
- Pediatric surgery, a medical sub-speciality of surgery performed by pediatrics
- Pediatric ophthalmology, a field of medicine treating eye disorders in children
- Pediatric neurology, a medical specialty dealing with disorders of the nervous system
- Pediatric emergency medicine, a subspecialty of both pediatrics and emergency medicine

== Others ==
- Pediatric intensive care unit, a hospital unit for crictically ill children
- Vietnam National Hospital of Pediatrics, a hospital in Hanoi
- Pediatric crowns, dental crowns used for restoring damaged teeth of children
- The Pediatric Oncologist, an American satirical comedy television series The Studio
