= Fetal alcohol spectrum disorder =

Group of conditions resulting from maternal alcohol consumption during pregnancy

Fetal alcohol spectrum disorders
- Other names: Foetal alcohol spectrum disorders, Foetal alcohol syndrome, Fetal alcohol syndrome, FASD, FAS, PAE, Prenatal alcohol exposure, Prenatal substance exposure, PSE
- Only 10% of individuals with FASD have associated facial features.
- Specialty: Embryology, toxicology, psychiatry, neurology, gynaecology, obstetrics, neonatology, pediatrics
- Symptoms: Varied; Craniofacial abnormality, short height, low body weight, small head size, poor coordination, behavior problems similar to ADHD, learning and speech problems, intellectual disability
- Complications: Babies: Miscarriage, stillbirth, preterm birth; Adults: Alcoholism, substance abuse
- Usual onset: Prenatal
- Duration: Lifelong
- Types: Fetal alcohol syndrome, partial fetal alcohol syndrome, alcohol-related neurodevelopmental disorder, static encephalopathy, alcohol-related birth defects
- Causes: Drinking alcohol during pregnancy
- Diagnostic method: Based on symptoms and prenatal alcohol exposure
- Differential diagnosis: ADHD, autism, bipolar disorder, conduct disorder, learning disability, oppositional defiant disorder
- Prevention: alcohol abstinence during pregnancy
- Treatment: Parent-child interaction therapy, efforts to modify child behavior, possibly medications
- Prognosis: Varies based on severity with FAS having a life expectancy of 34 years old without interventions. Unconfirmed (other types)
- Frequency: Unconfirmed; between 1 in 20 (~390 million) and 1 in 13 (~600 million) (all types); 0.2 and 9 per 1,000 (FAS)

Fetal alcohol spectrum disorders (FASDs) are a group of conditions that can occur in a person who is exposed to alcohol during gestation. FASDS affects 7.7 out of 1000 people globally, but is highly misdiagnosed and underdiagnosed.

The several forms of the condition (in order of most severe to least severe) are: fetal alcohol syndrome (FAS), partial fetal alcohol syndrome (pFAS), alcohol-related neurodevelopmental disorder (ARND), and neurobehavioral disorder associated with prenatal alcohol exposure (ND-PAE). Other terms used are fetal alcohol effects (FAE), partial fetal alcohol effects (PFAE), alcohol-related birth defects (ARBD), and static encephalopathy, but these terms have fallen out of favor and are no longer considered part of the spectrum.

Not all infants exposed to alcohol in utero will have detectable FASD or pregnancy complications. The risk of FASD increases with the amount consumed, the frequency of consumption, and the longer duration of alcohol consumption during pregnancy, particularly binge drinking. The variance seen in outcomes of alcohol consumption during pregnancy is poorly understood. Diagnosis is based on an assessment of growth, facial features, central nervous system, and alcohol exposure by a multidisciplinary team of professionals. The main criteria for diagnosis of FASD are nervous system damage and alcohol exposure, with FAS including congenital malformations of the lips and growth deficiency. FASD is often misdiagnosed as or comorbid with ADHD.

Almost all experts recommend that the mother abstain from alcohol use during pregnancy to prevent FASDs. As the woman may not become aware that she has conceived until several weeks into the pregnancy, it is also recommended to abstain while attempting to become pregnant. Although the condition has no known cure, treatment can improve outcomes. Treatment needs vary but include psychoactive medications, behavioral interventions, tailored accommodations, and case management.

== Signs and symptoms ==
Facial characteristics of a child with FAS

The key signs of fetal alcohol syndrome (FAS) required for diagnosis include:

- Growth deficiency or failure to thrive: slow fetal growth low birth weight or height, small head circumference (microcephaly) (Note: ICD-codes in Popova study: R62.8††, R62.8¶¶, P05.9, P07.1, R62.8§§, R62.8‡‡, Q02)
- Congenital malformations of lips: short palpebral fissure lengths, smooth philtrum, and thin upper lip. (Note: Q10.3†, Q38.0*, Q38.0†)
- Nervous system damage: Clinically significant structural neurological, or functional impairment (Note: R94.1)

Popova et al. identified 428 ICD-10 conditions as co-occurring in individuals with FAS. Excluding conditions used in FAS diagnosis, co-occurring conditions with 50% prevalence or greater include:

- Conduct disorder, behavioral problems, disruptive behavior, or impulsivity (Note: F91)
- Developmental language disorder (Note: F80, F80.1, F80.2, F80.9)
- Hearing loss (Note: H65.2,H90.2,H90.5,H65.0)
- Visual impairment, including blindness or astigmatism (Note: H54,H52.2,H52.6,H54.2/54.4/54.5)
- Developmental delay, cognitive disorder, or mental deficiency (Note: F89)
- Premature birth (Note: P07.3)
- Substance dependence (Note: F10.2/F19.2)
- Congenital malformation of retina (Note: Coccygeal fovea (Q14.1‡). Retinal tortuosity (Q14.1§))
- Congenital fusion of cervical vertebrae or cervical spine fusion (Note: Q76.4)
- Attention deficit hyperactivity disorder (ADHD) or otherwise impaired attention (Note: F90.0, F90.1, F90.2, F90.8, F90.9)
- Small eye openings (blepharophimosis), (Note: Q10.0¶) or an abnormally increased distance between the eyes, or both (hypertelorism) (Note: Q75.2)

Other FASD conditions are partial expressions of FAS, where the central nervous system shows clinical deficits. In these other FASD conditions, an individual may be at greater risk for adverse outcomes because brain damage is present without associated visual cues of poor growth or the "FAS face" that might ordinarily trigger an FASD evaluation. Such individuals may be misdiagnosed with primary mental health disorders such as ADHD or oppositional defiant disorder without appreciation that brain damage is the underlying cause of these disorders, which requires a different treatment paradigm than typical mental health disorders. While other FASD conditions may not yet be included as an ICD or DSM-IV-TR diagnosis, they nonetheless pose significant impairment in functional behavior because of underlying brain damage. Many indications of fetal alcohol spectrum disorders are developmental. Therefore, although a child may appear 'normal' at birth, intellectual disabilities caused by alcohol before birth may not appear until the child begins school.

More broadly, alcohol use during pregnancy is also associated with:

- Intellectual disability, both in overall IQ measurements and in many functional tests
- Fetal mortality, such as spontaneous abortion (miscarriage), stillbirth, and sudden infant death syndrome
- Domestic violence and potential harm to the infant
- Sleep and sucking problems as a baby
- Heart: A heart murmur that frequently disappears by one year of age. Ventricular septal defect, atrial septal defect, tetralogy of Fallot, coarctation of the aorta, or cardiac rhythm dysfunction.
- Bones: Joint anomalies including abnormal position and function, altered palmar crease patterns, small distal phalanges, and small fifth fingernails.
- Kidneys: Horseshoe, aplastic, dysplastic, or hypoplastic kidneys.
- Eyes: Strabismus, optic nerve hypoplasia (which may cause light sensitivity, decreased visual acuity, or involuntary eye movements).
- Cleft lip with or without a cleft palate: Alcohol is known to be a folic acid antagonist, and a baby's palate and lip develop during the first trimester of the pregnancy (first 12 weeks). Heavy alcohol consumption and binge drinking during this time have been linked to orofacial cleft.
- Occasional problems: ptosis of the eyelid, microphthalmia, webbed neck, short neck, radioulnar synostosis, spina bifida, and hydrocephalus.

Alcohol can also harm the fertility of women who are planning for pregnancy. Adverse effects of alcohol can lead to malnutrition, seizures, vomiting, and dehydration. The mother can suffer from anxiety and depression, which can result in child abuse/neglect. It has also been observed that when the pregnant mother withdraws from alcohol, its effects are visible on the infant as well. The baby remains in an irritated mood, cries frequently, does not sleep properly, weakening of sucking ability and increased hunger.

In 2019, a study found that individuals with FASD have a higher risk of hypertension independent of race/ethnicity and obesity.

== Causes ==
Fetal alcohol spectrum disorders are caused by alcohol exposure during gestational development. If an individual was not exposed to alcohol before birth, they will not have FASD. However, not all infants exposed to alcohol in utero will have detectable FAS, FASD, or pregnancy complications.

=== Exposure limit ===
No safe level of fetal alcohol exposure has been established. Because alcohol is a known teratogen, it is considered unethical to do randomized controlled trials on pregnant women to determine the precise toxicity effects of alcohol. Among women who consume any quantity of alcohol during pregnancy, the risk of giving birth to a child with FASD is about 15%, and to a child with FAS about 1.5%. Drinking 2 standard drinks a day, or 6 standard drinks in a short time, carries a 4.3% risk of a FAS birth (i.e. one of every 23 heavy-drinking pregnant women will deliver a child with FAS). Furthermore, alcohol-related congenital abnormalities occur at an incidence of roughly one out of 67 women who drink alcohol during pregnancy. Among those mothers who have an alcohol use disorder, an estimated one-third of their children have FAS. The variance seen in outcomes of alcohol consumption during pregnancy is poorly understood. Aggravating factors may include low maternal weight, advanced maternal age, smoking, poor diet, genetics, and social risk factors.

The risk of FASD increases with the amount consumed, the frequency of consumption, and a longer duration of alcohol consumption during pregnancy. Blood alcohol concentration has been identified as a relevant factor. All forms of alcohol, such as beer, wine, and liquor, pose similar risk. Binge drinking increases the chances and severity of FASD to such an extent that Svetlana Popova has stated that "binge drinking is the direct cause of FAS or FASD". Small amounts of alcohol may not cause an abnormal appearance, however, small amounts of alcohol consumption while pregnant may cause behavioral problems and also increases the risk of miscarriage. Quasi-experimental studies provide moderately strong evidence that prenatal alcohol exposure causes detrimental cognitive outcomes, and some evidence of reduced birthweight, although no study was fully rated at low risk of bias and quantity of studies was limited.

The evidence is inconsistent and contradictory regarding the effects of low-to-moderate drinking, for example, less than 12 grams of ethanol per day. Many studies find no significant effect, but some find beneficial associations, and others find detrimental associations, even on the same outcomes. Summarizing studies by country shows some similarity in results, due to using the same data sources. The definition of low alcohol consumption varies significantly among studies and often fails to incorporate all aspects of timing, dose, and duration. Recall bias and socioeconomic and psychosocial factors have been controlled for in most studies, but it is likely that residual confounding due to missing factors and variation in methods still exists and is larger than any observed effects.

=== Paternal alcohol use ===
Fathers who consume alcohol before conception may contribute to FASD through long-term epigenetic modification of the father's sperm, but this has been challenged; evidence it can cause complete FAS is inconclusive.

== Prevention and stigma ==
A label on alcoholic drinks promoting zero alcohol during pregnancy

Almost all experts recommend that the mother abstain from alcohol use during pregnancy to prevent FASDs. A pregnant woman may not become aware that she has conceived until several weeks into the pregnancy, so it is also recommended to abstain from alcohol while attempting to become pregnant. The recommendations of abstaining from alcohol during pregnancy and while attempting to become have been made by the Surgeon General of the United States, the Centers for Disease Control, the American College of Obstetricians and Gynecologists, the American Academy of Pediatrics, the World Health Organization, the United Kingdom's National Institute for Health and Clinical Excellence, and many others. In the United States, federal legislation has required that warning labels be placed on all alcoholic beverage containers since 1988 under the Alcoholic Beverage Labeling Act.

=== Stigma ===
The most current advocacy perspectives encourage people and systems to approach FASD with interventions and support for individuals already living with FASD. Focusing on prevention often only further stigmatizes individuals with FASD and their birth parents. Advocates say, if a person is supporting people currently living with FASD, then that person is spreading the awareness needed for successful prevention efforts; "Intervention is Prevention". Many social determinants of health impact the effects of PAE:

- Genetics
- Poverty/Access to nutritious food
- Malnutrition
- Poor social support networks
- Lack of personal autonomy
- Access to healthcare
- Generational and sociocultural traumas
- Access to mental health care and treatment

=== Medication ===
Women can experience serious symptoms that accompany alcohol withdrawal during pregnancy. According to the World Health Organization, these symptoms can be treated during pregnancy with brief use of benzodiazepine tranquilizers. Currently, the FDA has approved three medications—naltrexone, acamprosate, and disulfiram—for the treatment of alcohol use disorder (AUD). However, there is insufficient data regarding the safety of these medications for pregnant women.

- Naltrexone is a nonselective opioid antagonist that is used to treat AUD and opioid use disorder. The long-term effects of naltrexone on the fetus are currently unknown. Animal studies show that naltrexone administered during pregnancy increases the incidence of early fetal loss; however, there are insufficient data available to identify the extent to which this is a risk in pregnant women.
- Acamprosate functions as both an antagonist of NMDA and glutamate and an agonist at GABA_{A} receptors, although its molecular mechanism is not completely understood. Acamprosate is effective at preventing alcohol relapse during abstinence. Animal data, however, suggest that acamprosate can have possible teratogenic effects on fetuses.
- Disulfiram prevents relapse by blocking the metabolism of acetaldehyde after consumption of alcohol, which leads to headache, nausea, and vomiting. Some evidence suggests that disulfiram use during the first trimester is associated with an increased risk of congenital malformations such as reduction defects and cleft palate. Additionally, the effects of disulfiram can involve hypertension, which can be harmful to both the pregnant woman and the fetus.

American Psychiatric Association guidelines recommend that medications not be used to treat alcohol use disorder in pregnant women except in cases of acute alcohol withdrawals or other co-existing conditions. Instead, behavioral interventions are usually preferred as treatments for pregnant women with AUD. Medications should only be used for pregnant women after carefully considering the potential risks and harms of the medications versus the benefits of alcohol cessation.

== Mechanism ==
After a pregnant woman consumes alcohol, the alcohol crosses through the placenta and umbilical cord to the developing fetus. Alcohol metabolizes slowly in the fetus and remains for a long time when compared to an adult. A human fetus appears to be at triple risk from maternal alcohol consumption:

1. The placenta allows free entry of ethanol and toxic metabolites like acetaldehyde into the fetal compartment. The so-called placental barrier is practically absent concerning ethanol.
2. The developing fetal nervous system appears particularly sensitive to ethanol toxicity. The latter interferes with proliferation, differentiation, neuronal migration, axonal outgrowth, integration, and fine-tuning of the synaptic network. In short, all major processes in the developing central nervous system appear compromised.
3. Fetal tissues are quite different from adult tissues in function and purpose. For example, the main detoxifying organ in adults is the liver, whereas the fetal liver is incapable of detoxifying ethanol, as the ADH and ALDH enzymes have not yet been brought to expression at this early stage. Up to term, fetal tissues do not have significant capacity for the detoxification of ethanol, and the fetus remains exposed to ethanol in the amniotic fluid for periods far longer than the decay time of ethanol in the maternal circulation. The lack of significant quantities of ADH and ALDH means that fetal tissues have much lower quantities of antioxidant enzymes, like SOD, glutathione transferases, and glutathione peroxidases, resulting in antioxidant protection being much less effective.

Although alcohol is known to be a teratogen (causing birth defects), the exact biological mechanisms for the development of FAS or FASD are unknown. However, clinical and animal studies have identified a broad spectrum of pathways through which maternal alcohol can negatively affect the outcome of a pregnancy. Clear conclusions with universal validity are difficult to draw, since different ethnic groups show considerable genetic polymorphism for the hepatic enzymes responsible for ethanol detoxification. Genetic examinations have revealed a continuum of long-lasting molecular effects that are not only timing specific but are also dosage specific; with even moderate amounts being able to cause alterations. Additionally, ethanol may alter fetal development by interfering with retinoic acid signaling as acetaldehyde can compete with retinaldehyde and prevents its oxidation to retinoic acid.

=== Developmental stages ===
Different body systems in the infant grow, mature, and develop at specific times during gestation. The effect of consumption of alcohol differs during each of these developmental stages:

- From conception to the third week, the most susceptible systems and organs are the brain, spinal cord, and heart. The effects of alcohol consumption early in the pregnancy can result in defects in these systems and organs.
- During the third week, alcohol can also damage the central nervous system of the fetus.
- During the fourth week of gestation, the limbs are being formed, and it is at this point that alcohol can affect the development of arms, legs, fingers, and toes. The eyes and ears also form during the fourth week and are more susceptible to the effects of alcohol.
- By the sixth week of gestation, the teeth and palate are forming, and alcohol consumption at this time will affect these structures. Alcohol use in this window is responsible for many of the facial characteristics of fetal alcohol syndrome.
- During the twelfth week, frequent alcohol exposure can negatively impact brain development, which affects cognitive, learning, and behavioral skills before birth.
- By the 20th week of gestation, the formation of organs and organ systems is well-developed. The infant is still susceptible to the damaging effects of alcohol.
- Ethanol exposure in the second trimester reduces nutrition levels and can affect the functioning of the endocrine system in both fetus and mother. This is because blood flow via the umbilical artery to the fetal brain is reduced.

== Diagnosis ==
Fetal alcohol spectrum disorders encompass a range of physical and neurodevelopmental problems which can result from prenatal alcohol exposure. Diagnosis is based on the signs and symptoms in the person and evidence of alcohol use. These diagnoses of fetal alcohol spectrum disorders are currently recognized:

- Fetal alcohol syndrome (FAS)
- Partial fetal alcohol syndrome (pFAS) refers to individuals with a known, or highly suspected, history of prenatal alcohol exposure who have alcohol-related physical and neurodevelopmental deficits that do not meet the full criteria for FAS.
- Alcohol-related neurodevelopmental disorder (ARND)
- Neurobehavioral disorder associated with prenatal alcohol exposure (ND-PAE)

As of 2016, the Swedish Agency for Health Technology Assessment and Assessment of Social Services accepts only FAS as a diagnosis, seeing the evidence as inconclusive for other types. The agency feels it is unclear if identifying a FASD-related condition benefits the diagnosed individual.

=== Classification ===
Presently, four FASD diagnostic systems that diagnose FAS and other FASD conditions have been developed in North America:

- The Institute of Medicine's guidelines for FAS, the first system to standardize diagnoses of individuals with prenatal alcohol exposure;
- The University of Washington's "The 4-Digit Diagnostic Code", which ranks the four key features of FASD on a Likert scale of one to four and yields 256 descriptive codes that can be categorized into 22 distinct clinical categories, ranging from FAS to no findings;
- The Centers for Disease Control's "Fetal Alcohol Syndrome: Guidelines for Referral and Diagnosis", which established consensus on the diagnosis FAS in the U.S. but deferred addressing other FASD conditions; and
- Canadian guidelines for FASD diagnoses, which established criteria for diagnosing FASD in Canada and harmonized most differences between the IOM and the University of Washington's systems.

Each diagnostic system requires an assessment of four key features: growth, facial features, central nervous system, and alcohol exposure. To determine any FASD condition, a multi-disciplinary evaluation is necessary to assess each of the four key features for assessment. Generally, a trained physician will determine growth deficiency and FAS facial features. While a qualified physician may also assess central nervous system structural abnormalities or neurological problems, usually central nervous system damage is determined through psychological, speech-language, and occupational therapy assessments to ascertain clinically significant impairments in three or more of the Ten Brain Domains. Prenatal alcohol exposure risk may be assessed by a qualified physician, psychologist, social worker, or chemical health counselor. These professionals work together as a team to assess and interpret data of each key feature for assessment and develop an integrative, multi-disciplinary report to diagnose FAS (or other FASD conditions) in an individual.

A positive finding on all four features is required for a diagnosis of FAS, and the four diagnostic systems essentially agree on criteria for fetal alcohol syndrome (FAS). However, there are differences among systems when full criteria for FAS are not met. Prenatal alcohol exposure and central nervous system damage are the critical elements of the spectrum of FASD, and a positive finding in these two features is sufficient for an FASD diagnosis in all FASD systems. But different researchers and systems may use a wide variety of terminology to describe an individual's FASD condition, as the nomenclature is still evolving. Most individuals with deficits resulting from prenatal alcohol exposure do not express all features of FAS and fall into other FASD conditions. The Canadian guidelines recommend the assessment and descriptive approach of the "4-Digit Diagnostic Code" for each key feature of FASD and the terminology of the IOM in diagnostic categories, excepting ARBD.

==== Fetal alcohol syndrome ====
The most severe condition is called Fetal Alcohol Syndrome (FAS), which refers to individuals who have a specific set of birth defects and neurodevelopmental disorders characteristic of the diagnosis. The following criteria must be fully met for an FAS diagnosis:

1. Prenatal or postnatal height or weight (or both) at or below the 10th percentile
2. All three FAS facial features present
3. Clinically significant structural, neurological, or functional impairment of the central nervous system
4. Confirmed or Unknown prenatal alcohol exposure

FAS is the only expression of FASD that has garnered consensus among experts to become an official ICD-9 and ICD-10 diagnosis.

==== Partial FAS ====
Partial FAS (pFAS) was previously known as atypical FAS in the 1997 edition of the "4-Digit Diagnostic Code". People with pFAS have a confirmed history of prenatal alcohol exposure, but may lack growth deficiency or the complete facial stigmata. Central nervous system damage is present at the same level as FAS. These individuals have the same functional disabilities but "look" less like FAS.

The following criteria must be fully met for a diagnosis of Partial FAS:

1. Two or three FAS facial features present
2. Clinically significant structural, neurological, or functional impairment in three or more of the Ten Brain Domains
3. Confirmed prenatal alcohol exposure

Growth or height may range from normal to deficient.

==== Alcohol-related neurodevelopmental disorder ====
Alcohol-related neurodevelopmental disorder (ARND) is the specific diagnosis of the non-dysmorphic type of FASD, where a majority of the symptoms are witnessed. The diagnosis was initially suggested by the Institute of Medicine to replace the terms FAE (fetal alcohol effects). It focuses on central nervous system damage, rather than growth deficiency or FAS facial features. The Canadian guidelines also use this diagnosis and the same criteria. While the "4-Digit Diagnostic Code" includes these criteria for three of its diagnostic categories, it refers to this condition as static encephalopathy. The behavioral effects of ARND are not necessarily unique to alcohol however, so use of the term must be within the context of confirmed prenatal alcohol exposure. ARND may be gaining acceptance over the terms FAE and ARBD to describe FASD conditions with central nervous system abnormalities or behavioral or cognitive abnormalities or both due to prenatal alcohol exposure without regard to growth deficiency or FAS facial features.

The following criteria must be fully met for a diagnosis of ARND or static encephalopathy:

1. Minimal or no FAS facial features present
2. Clinically significant structural, neurological, or functional impairment in three or more of the Ten Brain Domains
3. Confirmed prenatal alcohol exposure

Growth or height may range from normal to minimally deficient.

==== Neurobehavioral disorder associated with prenatal alcohol exposure ====
Neurobehavioral disorder associated with prenatal alcohol exposure (ND-PAE) is the spectrum-wide term for the psychiatric, behavioral, and neurological symptoms of all FASDs. It was introduced into the DSM-5 as a "condition for further study" and as a specified condition under, "other specified neurodevelopmental disorders" as a way to better study the behavioral aspects of all FASD disorders.

=== Specific criteria ===
==== Growth ====
In terms of FASD, growth deficiency is defined as significantly below average height, weight or both due to prenatal alcohol exposure and can be assessed at any point in the lifespan. Growth measurements must be adjusted for parental height, gestational age (for a premature infant), and other postnatal insults (e.g., poor nutrition), although birth height and weight are the preferred measurements. Deficiencies are documented when height or weight falls at or below the 10th percentile of standardized growth charts appropriate to the population. Prenatal or postnatal presentation of growth deficits can occur, but are most often postnatal.

Criteria for FASD are least specific in the Institute of Medicine (IOM) diagnostic system ("low birth weight..., decelerating weight not due to nutrition..., [or] disproportional low weight to height" p. 4 of executive summary), while the CDC use the 10th percentile as a cut-off to determine growth deficiency. The "4-Digit Diagnostic Code" allows for mid-range gradations in growth deficiency (between the 3rd and 10th percentiles) and severe growth deficiency at or below the 3rd percentile. Growth deficiency, which may range from mild to severe, is one of the diagnostic features of fetal alcohol syndrome (FAS) and partial fetal alcohol syndrome (pFAS), but is not required for diagnoses of alcohol-related neurodevelopmental disorder (ARND) under the diagnostic systems in which ARND is recognized.

The "4-Digit Diagnostic Code" from 2004 ranks growth deficiency as follows:

- Severe: Height and weight at or below the 3rd percentile.
- Moderate: Either height or weight at or below the 3rd percentile, but not both.
- Mild: Either height or weight or both between the 3rd and 10th percentiles.
- None: Height and weight both above the 10th percentile.

In the initial studies that described FAS, growth deficiency was a requirement for inclusion in the studies; thus, all the original people with FAS had growth deficiency as an artifact of sampling characteristics used to establish criteria for the syndrome. That is, growth deficiency is a key feature of FASD because growth deficiency was a criterion for inclusion in the study that defined FAS. Growth deficiency may be less critical for understanding the disabilities of FASD than the neurobehavioral sequelae to the brain damage. Canadian guidelines updated in 2016 deleted growth as a diagnostic criterion.

==== Facial features ====
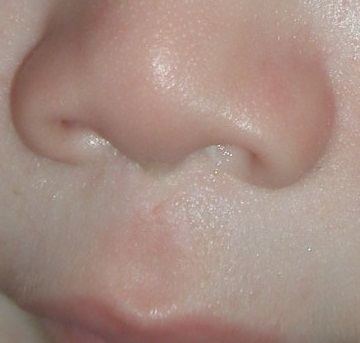
Smooth philtrum seen on a six-month-old baby with FAS

Several characteristic craniofacial abnormalities are often visible in individuals with FAS. The presence of FAS facial features indicates brain damage, although brain damage may also exist in their absence. FAS facial features (and most other visible, but non-diagnostic, deformities) are believed to be caused mainly during the 10th to 20th week of gestation.

Refinements in diagnostic criteria since 1975 have yielded three distinctive and diagnostically significant facial features which distinguish FAS from other disorders with partially overlapping characteristics. The three FAS facial features are:

- A smooth philtrum: The divot or groove between the nose and upper lip flattens with increased prenatal alcohol exposure.
- Thin vermilion: The upper lip thins with increased prenatal alcohol exposure.
- Small palpebral fissures: Eye width decreases with increased prenatal alcohol exposure.

Measurement of FAS facial features uses criteria developed by the University of Washington. The lip and philtrum are measured by a trained physician with the Lip-Philtrum Guide, a five-point Likert scale with representative photographs of lip and philtrum combinations ranging from normal (ranked 1) to severe (ranked 5). Palpebral fissure length (PFL) is measured in millimeters with either calipers or a clear ruler and then compared to a PFL growth chart, also developed by the University of Washington.

Ranking FAS facial features is complicated because the three separate facial features can be affected independently by prenatal alcohol. A summary of the criteria follows:

- Severe: All three facial features ranked independently as severe (lip ranked at 4 or 5, philtrum ranked at 4 or 5, and PFL two or more standard deviations below average).
- Moderate: Two facial features ranked as severe and one feature ranked as moderate (lip or philtrum ranked at 3, or PFL between one and two standard deviations below average).
- Mild: A mild ranking of FAS facial features covers a broad range of facial feature combinations:
  - Two facial features ranked severe, and one ranked within normal limits,
  - One facial feature ranked severe, and two ranked moderate, or
  - One facial feature ranked severe, one ranked moderate, and one ranked within normal limits.
- None: All three facial features ranked within normal limits.

==== Central nervous system ====
Central nervous system (CNS) damage is the primary feature of any FASD diagnosis. Prenatal alcohol exposure, which is classified as a teratogen, can damage the brain across a continuum of gross to subtle impairments, depending on the amount, timing, and frequency of the exposure as well as genetic predispositions of the fetus and mother. While functional abnormalities are the behavioral and cognitive expressions of the FASD disability, CNS damage can be assessed in three areas: structural, neurological, and functional impairments.

All four diagnostic systems allow for assessment of CNS damage in these areas, but the criteria vary. The IOM system requires structural or neurological impairment for a diagnosis of FAS, but also allows a "complex pattern" of functional anomalies for diagnosing PFAS and ARND. The "4-Digit Diagnostic Code" and CDC guidelines allow for a positive CNS finding in any of the three areas for any FASD diagnosis, but functional anomalies must measure at two standard deviations or worse in three or more functional domains for a diagnosis of FAS, PFAS, and ARND. The "4-Digit Diagnostic Code" also allows for an FASD diagnosis when only two functional domains are measured at two standard deviations or worse. The "4-Digit Diagnostic Code" further elaborates the degree of CNS damage according to four ranks:

- Definite: Structural impairments or neurological impairments for FAS or static encephalopathy.
- Probable: Significant dysfunction of two standard deviations or worse in three or more functional domains.
- Possible: Mild to moderate dysfunction of two standard deviations or worse in one or two functional domains or by judgment of the clinical evaluation team that CNS damage cannot be dismissed.
- Unlikely: No evidence of CNS damage.

===== Structural =====
Structural abnormalities of the brain are observable, and physical damage to the brain or brain structures caused by prenatal alcohol exposure. Structural impairments may include microcephaly (small head size) of two or more standard deviations below the average, or other abnormalities in brain structure (e.g., agenesis of the corpus callosum, cerebellar hypoplasia).

Microcephaly is determined by comparing head circumference (often called occipitofrontal circumference, or OFC) to appropriate OFC growth charts. Other structural impairments must be observed through medical imaging techniques by a trained physician. Because imaging procedures are expensive and relatively inaccessible to most people, diagnosis of FAS is not frequently made via structural impairments, except for microcephaly.

Evidence of a CNS structural impairment due to prenatal alcohol exposure will result in a diagnosis of FAS, and neurological and functional impairments are highly likely.

During the first trimester of pregnancy, alcohol interferes with the migration and organization of brain cells, which can create structural deformities or deficits within the brain. During the third trimester, damage can be caused to the hippocampus, which plays a role in memory, learning, emotion, and encoding visual and auditory information, all of which can create neurological and functional CNS impairments as well.

As of 2002, there were 25 reports of autopsies on infants known to have FAS. The first was in 1973, on an infant who died shortly after birth. The examination revealed extensive brain damage, including microcephaly, migration anomalies, corpus callosum dysgenesis, and a massive neuroglial, leptomeningeal heterotopia covering the left hemisphere.

In 1977, Clarren described a second infant whose mother was a binge drinker. The infant died ten days after birth. The autopsy showed severe hydrocephalus, abnormal neuronal migration, and a small corpus callosum. FAS has also been linked to brainstem and cerebellar changes, agenesis of the corpus callosum and anterior commissure, neuronal migration errors, absent olfactory bulbs, meningomyelocele, and porencephaly.

Additional structural defects were identified in various autopsies since then, including: Ulegyria, microgyria, Hypoxic-Ischemic and/or Hemorrhagic lesions due to Perinatal stroke, ventriculomegaly, and cerebellar atrophy.

===== Neurological =====
When structural impairments are not observable or do not exist, neurological impairments are assessed. In the context of FASD, neurological impairments are caused by prenatal alcohol exposure, which causes general neurological damage to the central nervous system (CNS), the peripheral nervous system, or the autonomic nervous system. A determination of a neurological problem must be made by a trained physician, and must not be due to a postnatal insult, such as meningitis, concussion, traumatic brain injury, etc.

All four diagnostic systems show virtual agreement on their criteria for CNS damage at the neurological level, and evidence of a CNS neurological impairment due to prenatal alcohol exposure will result in a diagnosis of FAS or pFAS, and functional impairments are highly likely.

Neurological abnormalities in fetal alcohol spectrum disorders may present as either hard neurological signs, such as epilepsy or other seizure disorders, or as soft neurological signs. Soft signs include nonspecific neurological abnormalities such as impaired fine motor skills, sensory deficits, poor gait, clumsiness, and impaired eye–hand coordination. While some soft neurological signs can be assessed using standardized, norm-referenced measures, others require clinical evaluation by qualified healthcare professionals with expertise in neurodevelopmental disorders.

===== Functional =====
When structural or neurological impairments are not observed, all four diagnostic systems allow CNS damage due to prenatal alcohol exposure to be assessed in terms of functional impairments. Functional impairments are deficits, problems, delays, or abnormalities due to prenatal alcohol exposure (rather than hereditary causes or postnatal insults) in observable and measurable domains related to daily functioning, often referred to as developmental disabilities. There is no consensus on a specific pattern of functional impairments due to prenatal alcohol exposure and only CDC guidelines label developmental delays as such, so criteria (and FASD diagnoses) vary somewhat across diagnostic systems.

The four diagnostic systems list various CNS domains that can qualify for functional impairment, which can determine an FASD diagnosis:

- Evidence of a complex pattern of behavior or cognitive abnormalities inconsistent with developmental level in the following CNS domains – Sufficient for a pFAS or ARND diagnosis using IOM guidelines
  - Learning disabilities, academic achievement, impulse control, social perception, communication, abstraction, math skills, memory, attention, judgment
- Performance at two or more standard deviations on standardized testing in three or more of the following CNS domains – Sufficient for an FAS, pFAS or static encephalopathy diagnosis using 4-Digit Diagnostic Code
  - Executive functioning, memory, cognition, social/adaptive skills, academic achievement, language, motor skills, attention, activity level
- General cognitive deficits (e.g., IQ) at or below the 3rd percentile on standardized testing – Sufficient for an FAS diagnosis using CDC guidelines
- Performance at or below the 16th percentile on standardized testing in three or more of the following CNS domains – Sufficient for an FAS diagnosis using CDC guidelines
  - Cognition, executive functioning, motor functioning, attention and hyperactive problems, social skills, sensory processing disorder, social communication, memory, difficulties responding to common parenting practices
- Performance at two or more standard deviations on standardized testing in three or more of the following CNS domains – Sufficient for an FAS diagnosis using Canadian guidelines
  - Cognition, communication, academic achievement, memory, executive functioning, adaptive behavior, motor skills, social skills, social communication

===== Ten brain domains =====
A recent effort to standardize assessment of functional CNS damage has been suggested by an experienced FASD diagnostic team in Minnesota. The proposed framework attempts to harmonize IOM, 4-Digit Diagnostic Code, CDC, and Canadian guidelines for measuring CNS damage vis-à-vis FASD evaluations and diagnosis. The standardized approach is referred to as the Ten Brain Domains and encompasses aspects of all four diagnostic systems' recommendations for assessing CNS damage due to prenatal alcohol exposure. The framework provides clear definitions of brain dysfunction, specifies empirical data needed for accurate diagnosis, and defines intervention considerations that address the complex nature of FASD with the intention to avoid common secondary disabilities.

The proposed Ten Brain Domains include:

- Achievement
- Adaptive behavior
- Attention
- Cognition
- Executive functioning
- Language
- Memory
- Motor skills
- Multisensory integration or soft neurological problems
- Social communication

The Fetal Alcohol Diagnostic Program (FADP) uses unpublished Minnesota state criteria of performance at 1.5 or more standard deviations on standardized testing in three or more of the Ten Brain Domains to determine CNS damage. However, the Ten Brain Domains are easily incorporated into any of the four diagnostic systems' CNS damage criteria, as the framework only proposes the domains, rather than the cut-off criteria for FASD.

==== Alcohol exposure ====
Prenatal alcohol exposure is determined by interview of the biological mother or other family members knowledgeable of the mother's alcohol use during the pregnancy (if available), prenatal health records (if available), and review of available birth records, court records (if applicable), chemical dependency treatment records (if applicable), chemical biomarkers, or other reliable sources.

Assessment of prenatal alcohol exposure varies among diagnostic systems. The Institute of Medicine (IOM), the U.S. Centers for Disease Control and Prevention (CDC), and the Canadian guidelines classify exposure as confirmed, absent, or unknown when relevant to diagnosis, although specific criteria differ among systems. The 4-Digit Diagnostic Code further categorizes confirmed prenatal alcohol exposure according to estimated level of risk.

- Confirmed exposure: The CDC guidelines are silent on using information on the amount, frequency, and timing of prenatal alcohol use for diagnostic purposes. The IOM and Canadian guidelines explore this further, acknowledging the importance of significant alcohol exposure from regular or heavy episodic alcohol consumption in determining, but offer no standard for diagnosis. Canadian guidelines discuss this lack of clarity and parenthetically point out that "heavy alcohol use" is defined by the National Institute on Alcohol Abuse and Alcoholism as five or more drinks per episode on five or more days during 30 days. "The 4-Digit Diagnostic Code" ranking system distinguishes between levels of prenatal alcohol exposure as high risk and some risk. It operationalizes high risk exposure as a blood alcohol concentration (BAC) greater than 100 mg/dL delivered at least weekly in early pregnancy. This BAC level is typically reached by a 55 kg female drinking six to eight beers in one sitting.
  - High Risk: Confirmed use of alcohol during pregnancy known to be at high blood alcohol levels (100 mg/dL or greater) delivered at least weekly in early pregnancy.
  - Some Risk: Confirmed use of alcohol during pregnancy with use less than High Risk or unknown usage patterns.
- Unknown Risk: Unknown use of alcohol during pregnancy. For many adopted adults and children in foster care, records or other reliable sources may not be available for review. Reporting alcohol use during pregnancy can also be stigmatizing to birth mothers, especially if alcohol use is ongoing. Many are reluctant to admit to drinking or to provide an In some cases, reliable information regarding prenatal alcohol exposure is unavailable. In such cases, diagnostic systems classify the exposure history as unknown. A diagnosis of fetal alcohol syndrome (FAS) may nevertheless be made when the characteristic facial anomalies and other required diagnostic criteria are present, even in the absence of confirmed prenatal alcohol exposure. report of the quantity they drank.In some cases, reliable information regarding prenatal alcohol exposure is unavailable. In such cases, diagnostic systems classify the exposure history as unknown. A diagnosis of fetal alcohol syndrome (FAS) may nevertheless be made when the characteristic facial anomalies and other required diagnostic criteria are present, even in the absence of confirmed prenatal alcohol exposure.
- No Risk: Confirmed absence of prenatal alcohol exposure. Confirmed absence of exposure would apply to planned pregnancies in which no alcohol was used or pregnancies of women who do not use alcohol or report no use during the pregnancy. This designation is relatively rare, as most people presenting for an FASD evaluation are at least suspected to have had a prenatal alcohol exposure due to the presence of other key features of FASD.

==== Biomarkers ====
Evidence is insufficient for the use of chemical biomarkers to detect prenatal alcohol exposure. Biomarkers being studied include fatty acid ethyl esters (FAEE) detected in the meconium (first feces of an infant) and hair. FAEE may be present if chronic alcohol exposure occurs during the second and third trimesters since this is when the meconium begins to form. Concentrations of FAEE can be influenced by medication use, diet, and individual genetic variations in FAEE metabolism, however.

=== Differential diagnosis ===
The CDC reviewed nine syndromes that have overlapping features with FAS; however, none of these syndromes include all three FAS facial features, and none are the result of prenatal alcohol exposure:

- Aarskog syndrome
- Williams syndrome
- Noonan syndrome
- Dubowitz syndrome
- Brachman-DeLange syndrome
- Toluene syndrome
- Fetal hydantoin syndrome
- Fetal valproate syndrome
- Maternal PKU fetal effects

Other disorders that have overlapping behavioral symptoms that might be comorbid to fetal alcohol spectrum disorder might include:

- Attention deficit hyperactive disorder
- Autism spectrum disorder
- Reactive attachment disorder
- Oppositional defiant disorder
- Sensory integration dysfunction
- Bipolar disorder
- Depression

Most people with FASD have most often been misdiagnosed with ADHD due to the large overlap between their behavioral deficits.

== Treatment ==
Although the condition has no available cure, treatment can improve outcomes. Because central nervous system damage, symptoms, secondary disabilities, and needs vary widely by individual, there is no one treatment type that works for everyone.

Between 2017 and 2019 researchers made a breakthrough when they discovered a possible cure using neural stem cells; they propose that if applied to a newborn, the damage can be reversed and prevent any lasting effects in the future.

=== Medications ===
Psychoactive drugs are frequently tried as many FASD symptoms are mistaken for or overlap with other disorders, most notably ADHD. Medications are used to specifically treat symptoms of FASDs and not FAS entirely. Some of the medications used are antidepressants, stimulants, neuroleptics, and anti-anxiety drugs.

=== Behavioral interventions ===
Early intervention from birth to age 3 has been shown to improve the development of a child born with FASD. Interventions may include parent–child interaction therapy, efforts to modify child behavior, and drugs. Behavioral interventions are based on the learning theory, which is the basis for many parenting and professional strategies and interventions. Along with ordinary parenting styles, such strategies are frequently used by default for treating those with FAS, as the diagnoses oppositional defiance disorder, conduct disorder, and reactive attachment disorder often overlap with FAS (along with ADHD), and these are sometimes thought to benefit from behavioral interventions. Frequently, a person's poor academic achievement results in special education services, which also utilize principles of learning theory, behavior modification, and outcome-based education.

Children with FAS benefit from behavioral and functional training, social skill training, and tutoring. Support groups and talk therapy not only help the children suffering from FAS, but also help the parents and siblings of these children.

=== Developmental framework ===
Many books and handouts on FAS recommend a developmental approach, based on developmental psychology, even though most do not specify it as such and provide little theoretical background. Optimal human development generally occurs in identifiable stages (e.g., Jean Piaget's theory of cognitive development, Erik Erikson's stages of psychosocial development, John Bowlby's attachment framework, and other developmental stage theories). FAS interferes with normal development, which may cause stages to be delayed, skipped, or immaturely developed. Over time, an unaffected child can negotiate the increasing demands of life by progressing through stages of development normally, but not so for a child with FAS.

By knowing what developmental stages and tasks children follow, treatment and interventions for FAS can be tailored to helping a person meet developmental tasks and demands successfully. If a person is delayed in the adaptive behavior domain, for instance, then interventions would be recommended to target specific delays through additional education and practice (e.g., practiced instruction on tying shoelaces), giving reminders, or making accommodations (e.g., using slip-on shoes) to support the desired functioning level. This approach is an advance over behavioral interventions, because it takes the person's developmental context into account while developing interventions.

=== Advocacy model ===
The advocacy model takes the point of view that someone is needed to actively mediate between the environment and the person with FAS. Advocacy activities are conducted by an advocate (for example, a family member, friend, or case manager) and fall into three basic categories. An advocate for FAS: (1) interprets FAS and the disabilities that arise from it and explains it to the environment in which the person operates, (2) engenders change or accommodation on behalf of the person, and (3) assists the person in developing and reaching attainable goals.

The advocacy model is often recommended, for example, when developing an individualized education program for the person's progress at school.

An understanding of the developmental framework would presumably inform and enhance the advocacy model, but advocacy also implies interventions at a systems level as well, such as educating schools, social workers, and so forth on best practices for FAS. However, several organizations devoted to FAS also use the advocacy model at a community practice level as well.

Treating FAS at the public health and public policy level promotes FAS prevention and diversion of public resources to assist those with FAS. It is related to the advocacy model but promoted at a systems level (rather than with the individual or family), such as developing community education and supports, state or province level prevention efforts (e.g., screening for maternal alcohol use during obstetrics and gynaecology or prenatal medical care visits), or national awareness programs. Several organizations and state agencies in the U.S. are dedicated to this type of intervention.

== Prognosis ==
The prognosis of FASD is variable depending on the type, severity, and whether treatment is issued. Prognostic disabilities are divided into primary and secondary disabilities.

=== Primary disabilities ===
The primary disabilities of FAS are the functional difficulties with which the child is born as a result of central nervous system damage due to prenatal alcohol exposure.

Often, primary disabilities are mistaken as behavior problems, but the underlying central nervous system damage is the originating source of a functional difficulty, rather than a mental health condition, which is considered a secondary disability. The exact mechanisms for functional problems of primary disabilities are not always fully understood, but animal studies have begun to shed light on some correlates between functional problems and brain structures damaged by prenatal alcohol exposure. Representative examples include:

- Learning impairments are associated with impaired dendrites of the hippocampus
- Impaired motor development and functioning are associated with reduced size of the cerebellum
- Hyperactivity is associated with decreased size of the corpus callosum

Functional difficulties may result from CNS damage in more than one domain, but common functional difficulties by domain include: Note that this is not an exhaustive list of difficulties.

- Achievement: Learning disabilities
- Adaptive behavior: Poor impulse control, poor personal boundaries, poor anger management, stubbornness, intrusive behavior, too friendly with strangers, poor daily living skills, developmental delays
- Attention: Attention-deficit/hyperactivity disorder (ADHD), poor attention or concentration, distractible
- Cognition: Intellectual disability, confusion under pressure, poor abstract skills, difficulty distinguishing between fantasy and reality, slower cognitive processing
- Executive functioning: Poor judgment, information-processing disorder, poor at perceiving patterns, poor cause and effect reasoning, inconsistent at linking words to actions, poor generalization ability
- Language: Expressive or receptive language disorders, grasp parts but not whole concepts, lack understanding of metaphor, idioms, or sarcasm
- Memory: Poor short-term memory, inconsistent memory and knowledge base
- Motor skills: Poor handwriting, poor fine motor skills, poor gross motor skills, delayed motor skill development (e.g., riding a bicycle at an appropriate age)
- Sensory processing and soft neurological problems: sensory processing disorder, sensory defensiveness, undersensitivity to stimulation
- Social communication: Intrude into conversations, inability to read nonverbal or social cues, "chatty" but without substance

=== Secondary disabilities ===
The secondary disabilities of FAS are those that arise later in life, secondary to central nervous system damage. These disabilities often emerge over time due to a mismatch between the primary disabilities and environmental expectations; secondary disabilities can be ameliorated with early interventions and appropriate supportive services.

Six main secondary disabilities were identified in a University of Washington research study of 473 subjects diagnosed with FAS, PFAS (partial fetal alcohol syndrome), and ARND (alcohol-related neurodevelopmental disorder):

- Mental health problems: Diagnosed with ADHD, clinical depression, or other mental illness, experienced by over 90% of the subjects
- Disrupted school experience: Suspended or expelled from school or dropped out of school, experienced by 60% of the subjects (age 12 and older)
- Trouble with the law: Charged with or convicted of a crime, experienced by 60% of the subjects (age 12 and older)
- Confinement: For inpatient psychiatric care, inpatient chemical dependency care, or incarceration for a crime, experienced by about 50% of the subjects (age 12 and older)
- Inappropriate sexual behavior: Sexual advances, sexual touching, or promiscuity, experienced by about 50% of the subjects (age 12 and older)
- Alcohol and drug problems: Abuse or dependency, experienced by 35% of the subjects (age 12 and older)

Two additional secondary disabilities exist for adults:

- Dependent living: Group home, living with family or friends, or some sort of assisted living, experienced by 80% of the subjects (age 21 and older)
- Problems with employment: Required ongoing job training or coaching, could not keep a job, unemployed, experienced by 80% of the subjects (age 21 and older)

=== Protective factors and strengths ===
Eight factors were identified in the same study as universal protective factors that reduced the incidence rate of the secondary disabilities:

- Living in a stable and nurturing home for over 73% of life
- Being diagnosed with FAS before age six
- Never having experienced violence
- Remaining in each living situation for at least 2.8 years
- Experiencing a "good quality home" (meeting 10 or more defined qualities) from age 8 to 12 years old
- Having been found eligible for developmental disability (DD) services
- Having basic needs met for at least 13% of life
- Having a diagnosis of FAS (rather than another FASD condition)

Malbin (2002) has identified the following areas of interest and talents as strengths that often stand out for those with FASD and should be utilized, like any strength, in treatment planning:

- Music, playing instruments, composing, singing, art, spelling, reading, computers, mechanics, woodworking, skilled vocations (welding, electrician, etc.), writing, poetry
- Participation in non-impact sports or physical fitness activities

=== Lifespan ===
One study found that the people with FAS had a significantly shorter life expectancy. With the average life span of 34 years old, a study found that 44% of the deaths were of "external cause", with 15% of deaths being suicides.

== Epidemiology ==
Globally, one in 10 women drinks alcohol during pregnancy. Out of this population, 20% binge drink and have four or more alcoholic drinks per single occasion. The use of alcohol during pregnancy occurs at different rates across the world, potentially due to various cultural differences and legislation. The five countries with the highest prevalence of alcohol use during pregnancy are Ireland (60%), Belarus (47%), Denmark (46%), the UK (41%), and the Russian Federation (37%).

In a recent count, the prevalence of having any FASD disorder was 1 person out of 20, but some people estimate it could be as high as 1 in 7. The rates of FAS and FASD are likely to be underestimated, because of the difficulty in making the diagnosis and the reluctance of clinicians to label children and mothers.

=== Australia ===
FASD among Australian youth is more common in indigenous Australians. The only states that have registered birth defects in Australian youth are Western Australia, New South Wales, Victoria and South Australia. In Australia, only 12% of Australian health professionals are aware of the diagnostics and symptoms of FASD. In Western Australia, the rate of births resulting in FASD is 0.02 per 1,000 births for non-Indigenous Australians, however among indigenous births the rate is 2.76 per 1,000 births. In Victoria, there have been no registered FASD related births for indigenous Australians, but the rate for the general population in Victoria is 0.01–0.03 per 1000 births. There have been no dedicated FASD clinics within Western Australia, but there are also no nationally supported diagnostic criteria anywhere in Australia. Passive surveillance is a prevention technique used within Australia to assist in monitoring and establishing detectable defects during pregnancy and childhood.

=== Canada ===
A 2015 review article estimated the overall costs to Canada from FASD at $9.7 billion (including from crime, healthcare, education, etc.).

=== South Africa ===
In South Africa, some populations have rates as high as 9%.

=== United States ===
In the United States, alcohol use at some point during pregnancy is common and appears to be rising in prevalence. In 2006–2010, an estimated 7.6% of pregnant women used alcohol, while 1.4% of pregnant women reported binge drinking during their pregnancy. The highest prevalence estimates of reported alcohol use during pregnancy were among women who are aged 35–44 years (14.3%), white (8.3%), college graduates (10.0%), or employed (9.6%). In 2015, about 10% of pregnant women drank alcohol in the past month, and 20% to 30% drank at some point during the pregnancy. Of pregnant American women, 3.6% met criteria for an alcohol use disorder in a 2001 epidemiological study. As of 2016, the US Centers for Disease Control estimated 3 million women in the United States are at risk of having a baby with FASD.

FASD is estimated to affect between 1–2% and 5% of people in the United States and Western Europe. FAS is believed to occur in between 0.2 and 9 per 1,000 live births in the United States. Using medical and other records, CDC studies have identified 0.2 to 1.5 infants with FAS for every 1,000 live births in certain areas of the United States. A more recent CDC study of 2010 data analyzed medical and other records and found FAS in 0.3 out of 1,000 children from 7 to 9 years of age.

The lifetime cost per child with FAS in the United States was estimated at $2 million (for an overall cost across the country of over $4 billion) by the CDC in 2002.

== History ==
=== Before designation ===
Some hold that ancient sources describe the negative effects of alcohol during pregnancy, identifying admonitions from ancient Greece, Rome, the Talmud, and the Bible. For example, Plato writes in his fourth-century B.C. Laws (6.775): "Drinking to excess is a practice that is nowhere seemly ... nor yet safe. ... It behooves both bride and bridegroom to be sober ... in order to ensure, as far as possible, in every case that the child that is begotten may be sprung from the loins of sober parents." The sixth-century AD Talmud (Kethuboth 60b) cautions, "One who drinks intoxicating liquor will have ungainly children." However, ancient sources rarely, if ever, distinguish maternal alcohol consumption from paternal, and are more concerned with conception than pregnancy. The sources can often be viewed as expressing heredity, that children are likely to turn out like their (alcoholic) parents, rather than presenting the modern viewpoint that alcohol itself has an impact.

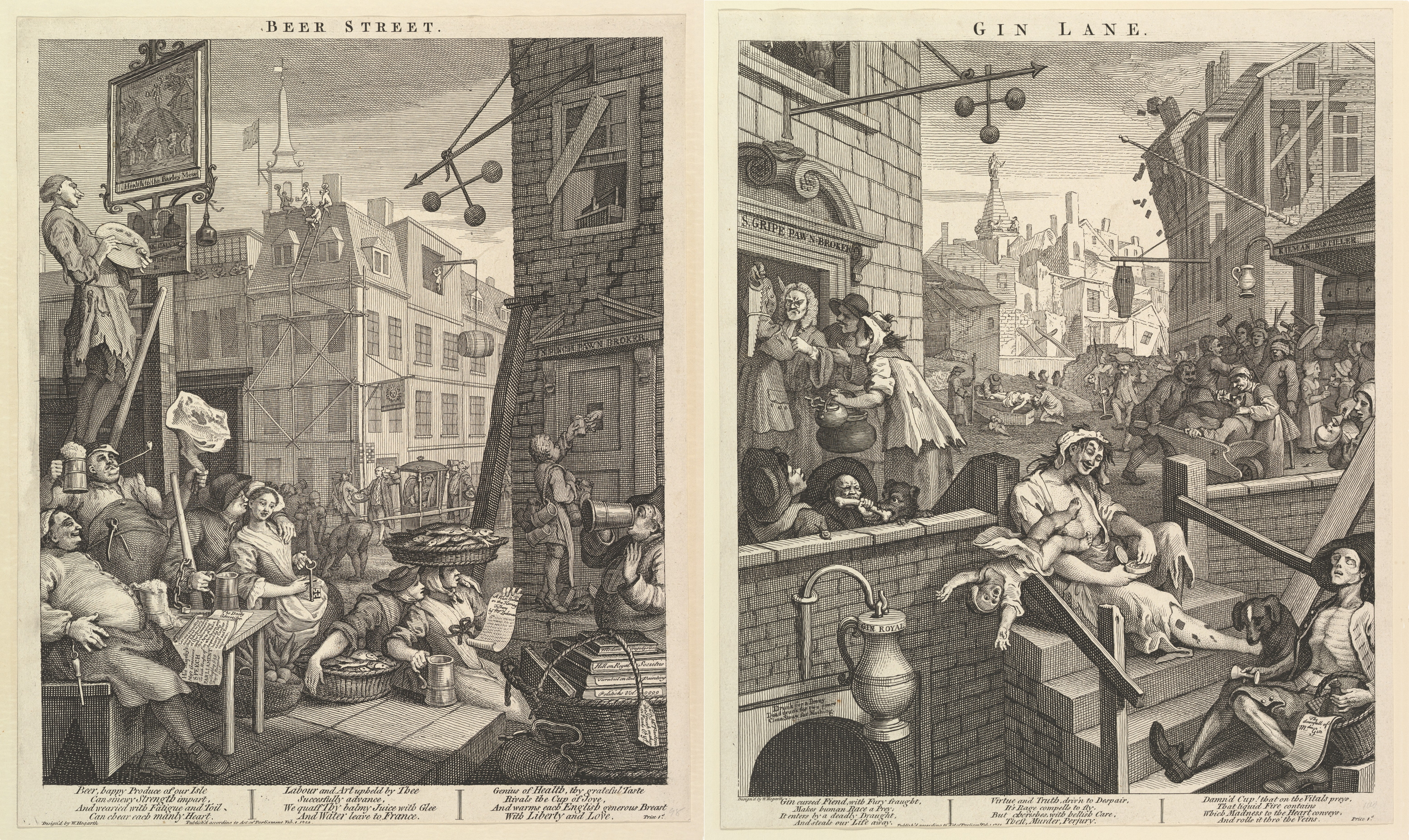
Beer Street and Gin Lane, William Hogarth (1751)

In 1725, in the midst of the Gin Craze, British physicians petitioned the House of Commons on the effects of strong drink when consumed by pregnant women saying that such drinking is "too often the cause of weak, feeble, and distempered children, who must be, instead of an advantage and strength, a charge to their country". There are many other such historical references during that period. Gin specifically was implicated as affecting children's health and causing stillbirth and infant mortality, as depicted in William Hogarth's Gin Lane. In contrast, Hogarth's Beer Street shows commerce and happiness, suggesting that the alcohol in beer was not known to have deleterious effects at this time.

In the 19th century, Benjamin Rush and Thomas Trotter lobbied against alcohol consumption during pregnancy to avoid dependence and mental deficiency in children. The teetotalism and temperance movements popularized these and other claims, including the teratogenic effects of alcohol on animal embryos, but they were often sensationalized, so much so that any finding that alcohol was harmful was largely denounced as propaganda. A prominent observation of possible links between maternal alcohol use and fetal damage was made in 1899 by Dr. William Sullivan, a Liverpool prison physician who noted higher rates of stillbirth for 120 alcoholic female prisoners than their sober female relatives. He suggested the causal agent to be alcohol use. This contradicted the predominant belief at the time that heredity caused intellectual disability, poverty, and criminal behavior, which contemporary studies on the subjects usually concluded. A case study by Henry H. Goddard of the Kallikak family—popular in the early 1900s—represents this earlier perspective, though later researchers have suggested that the Kallikaks almost certainly had FAS. General studies and discussions on alcoholism throughout the mid-1900s were typically based on a heredity argument. Researchers were often temperance advocates and funded by like-minded organizations such as the Anti-Saloon League, so clinicians viewed all such research with heavy skepticism. The temperance movement effectively shut down serious research into the subject for nearly 50 years after Prohibition. In the 1940s it was generally dismissed as superstition.

From the 1960s to the 1980s, alcohol was commonly used as a tocolytic, a method to stop preterm labor (born at less than 37 weeks gestation). The method originated with Dr. Fritz Fuchs, the chairman of the department of obstetrics and gynecology at Cornell University Medical College. Doctors recommended a small amount of alcohol to calm the uterus during contractions in early pregnancy or Braxton Hicks contractions. In later stages of pregnancy, the alcohol was administered intravenously and often in large amounts. "Women experienced similar effects as occur with oral ingestion, including intoxication, nausea and vomiting, and potential alcohol poisoning, followed by hangovers when the alcohol was discontinued." Vomiting put the mother at a high risk for aspiration and was "a brutal procedure for all involved". Because the alcohol was being given intravenously, the doctor could continue giving the treatment to the mother long after she had passed out, resulting in her being more intoxicated than would otherwise be possible. Such heavy intoxication was highly likely to contribute to FASD. In a 2015 review, ethanol was found to be no better than a placebo (sugar water) in suppressing preterm birth and neonatal mortality. Not only was ethanol worse than other beta-mimetic drugs (tocolytic agents) at postponing birth, it also led to a higher rate of low birthweight babies, babies with breathing problems at birth, and neonatal death.

=== Recognition as a syndrome ===
In France in 1957, Jacqueline Rouquette had described 100 children whose parents were alcoholics in a thesis, which was not published. "She gave a good description in certain cases of the facies" according to her mentor, Paul Lemoine. In 1968, Paul Lemoine of Nantes published a study in a French medical journal about children with distinctive features whose mothers were alcoholics.

Independently, in the U.S., Christy Ulleland at University of Washington Medical School conducted an 18-month study in 1968–1969 documenting the risk of maternal alcohol consumption among the offspring of 11 alcoholic mothers. This study is arguably the true source of the modern understanding. The infants were studied by dysmorphologists Kenneth Lyons Jones and David Weyhe Smith, colleagues of Ulleland at University of Washington, who identified a pattern of "craniofacial, limb, and cardiovascular defects associated with prenatal onset growth deficiency and developmental delay" in eight children. The pattern of malformations indicated that the damage was prenatal. They named these defects "fetal alcohol syndrome". News of the discovery shocked some, while others were skeptical of the findings. While many syndromes are eponymous, i.e. named after the physician first reporting the association of symptoms, Smith named FAS after the causal agent of the symptoms. He reasoned that doing so would encourage prevention, believing that if people knew maternal alcohol consumption caused the syndrome, then abstinence during pregnancy would follow from patient education and public awareness. At the time, nobody was aware of the full range of possible birth defects from FAS or its rate of prevalence.

In 1978, within nine years of the Washington discovery, animal studies, including non-human primate studies carried out at the University of Washington Primate Center by Sterling Clarren, had confirmed that alcohol was a teratogen. By 1978, 245 cases of FAS had been reported by medical researchers, and the syndrome began to be described as the most frequent known cause of intellectual disability. In 1979, the Washington and Nantes findings were confirmed by a research group in Gothenburg, Sweden. Researchers in France, Sweden, and the United States were struck by how similar these children looked, though they were not related, and how they behaved in the same unfocused and hyperactive manner.

=== "Spectrum" rather than "syndrome" ===
Over time, subsequent research and clinical experience suggested that a range of effects could arise from prenatal alcohol exposure. The term fetal alcohol effects (FAE) was used for alcohol-related neurodevelopmental disorder and alcohol-related birth defects. It was initially used in research studies to describe humans and animals in whom teratogenic effects were seen after confirmed prenatal alcohol exposure (or unknown exposure for humans), but without obvious physical anomalies. Smith (1981) described FAE as an "extremely important concept" to highlight the debilitating effects of brain damage, regardless of the growth or facial features. This term fell out of favor with clinicians in the 1990s because it was often regarded by the public as a less severe disability than FAS, when in fact its effects could be just as detrimental. In 1996, the replacement terms alcohol-related brain damage (ARBD) and alcohol-related neurodevelopmental disorder (ARND) were introduced. in 2002, the US Congress mandated that the CDC develop diagnostic guidelines for FAS and in 2004 a definition of a term that already had been used by some in the 1990s, fetal alcohol spectrum disorder (FASD), was adopted, to include FAS as well as other conditions resulting from prenatal alcohol exposure. Currently, FAS is the only expression of prenatal alcohol exposure defined by the International Statistical Classification of Diseases and Related Health Problems and assigned ICD-9 and diagnoses.

Alcohol-related birth defects (ARBD), formerly known as possible fetal alcohol effect (PFAE), was a term proposed as an alternative to FAE and PFAE. The IOM presents ARBD as a list of congenital anomalies that are linked to maternal alcohol use but have no key features of FASD. PFAE and ARBD have fallen out of favor because these anomalies are not necessarily specific to maternal alcohol consumption and are not criteria for diagnosis of FASD.

In 2013, the American Psychiatric Association introduced neurobehavioral disorder associated with prenatal alcohol exposure (ND-PAE).

== Society and culture ==
=== Criminalization ===
Criminalization of substance use during pregnancy because of harm to the fetus or child is fiercely debated. Elizabeth Armstrong has questioned the zero-tolerance approach taken towards alcohol consumption during pregnancy, describing it as a moral panic. While heavy alcohol consumption during pregnancy is known to be damaging to the unborn child, the effects of low intakes remain debatable, particularly in the absence of randomized controlled trials (cf. § Causes). The UK's abstinence recommendation was not chosen based on scientific evidence, but rather because it was simple advice that would ensure no one underestimated the risk. Tennessee's 2014 fetal assault law (which expired in 2016) was criticized for not addressing alcohol use. The law criminalized opioid use during pregnancy and resulted in women avoiding professional medical care for fear of prosecution. A wide variety of professional organizations oppose criminalization. Minnesota, North Dakota, Oklahoma, South Dakota, and Wisconsin have statutory authorization for the involuntary civil commitment of women who abuse alcohol during pregnancy.

=== 2016 CDC controversy ===
In 2016, a CDC press release and infographic entitled "More than 3 million US women at risk for alcohol-exposed pregnancy" caused controversy. The CDC release contained the message "The risk is real. Why take the chance?". Darlena Cunha of Time magazine interpreted the infographic as telling all women of child-bearing age not to drink at all, in case they might accidentally fall pregnant, and called them "scare tactics" and "shaming recommendations". Julie Beck said that the infographic insinuated that "your womb is a Schrödinger's box and you shouldn't pour alcohol into it unless you've peeked in there to be 100 percent sure the coast is clear". The CDC later clarified that the infographic was not intended to make any new guidelines or recommendations for women who are not pregnant, but rather to encourage conversations about alcohol with health professionals. Nonetheless, half of all pregnancies in developed countries and over 80% in developing countries are unplanned. Many women do not realize they are pregnant during the early stages and continue drinking when pregnant.

=== In fiction ===
In Aldous Huxley's 1932 novel Brave New World (where all fetuses are gestated in vitro in a factory), lower caste fetuses are created by receiving alcohol transfusions (Bokanovsky's Process) to reduce intelligence and height, thus conditioning them for simple, menial tasks. Connections between alcohol and incubating embryos are made multiple times in the novel.

== See also ==
- Alcohol packaging warning messages
- Environmental toxicants and fetal development
- Long-term effects of alcohol consumption
- Smoking and pregnancy
