= Smoking and pregnancy =

Tobacco smoking during pregnancy

Tobacco smoking during pregnancy causes many detrimental effects on health and reproduction, in addition to the general health effects of tobacco. A number of studies have shown that tobacco use is a significant factor in infertility and miscarriages among pregnant smokers, and that it contributes to a number of other threats to the health of the foetus.

Because of the associated risks, people are advised not to smoke before, during or after pregnancy. If this is not possible, however, reducing the daily number of cigarettes smoked can minimize the risks for both the mother and child. This is especially true for people in developing countries, where breastfeeding is essential for the child's overall nutritional status.

== Smoking before pregnancy ==
Women who are pregnant or planning to become pregnant are advised to stop smoking. It is important to examine these effects because smoking before, during and after pregnancy is not an unusual behavior among the general population and can have detrimental health impacts, especially among both mother and child, as a result.

According to a 1999 meta-analysis published in the American Journal of Preventive Medicine, smoking prior to pregnancy is strongly related to an increased risk of developing an ectopic pregnancy.

== Smoking during pregnancy ==
According to a study conducted in 2008 by the Pregnancy Risk Assessment Monitoring System (PRAMS) that interviewed people in 26 states in the United States, approximately 13% of women reported smoking during the last three months of pregnancy. Of women who smoked during the last three months of pregnancy, 52% reported smoking five or fewer cigarettes per day, 27% reported smoking six to 10 cigarettes per day, and 21% reported smoking 11 or more cigarettes per day.

In the United States, women whose pregnancies were unintended are 30% more likely to smoke during pregnancy than those whose pregnancies were intended.

=== Effects on ongoing pregnancy ===
Smoking during pregnancy can lead to a plethora of health risks and damage to both the mother and the fetus.

Women who smoke during pregnancy are about twice as likely to experience the following pregnancy complications:

- premature rupture of membranes, which means that the amniotic sac will rupture prematurely, and will induce labour before the baby is fully developed. Although this complication generally has a good prognosis (in Western countries), it causes stress as the premature child may have to stay in the hospital to gain health and strength to be able to sustain life on their own.
- placental abruption, wherein there is premature separation of the placenta from the attachment site. The fetus can be put in distress, and can even die. The mother can lose blood and can have a haemorrhage; she may need a blood transfusion.
- placenta previa, where in the placenta grows in the lowest part of the uterus and covers all or part of the opening to the cervix. Placenta previa may cause economic stress for the patient in countries without free healthcare, due to the fact that it necessitates a caesarean section, which requires a longer recovery period in the hospital. There can also be complications, such as maternal hemorrhage.

According to a 1999 meta-analysis published in the American Journal of Preventive Medicine, smoking during pregnancy is related to a reduced risk of developing pre-eclampsia.

==== Premature birth ====
Some studies show that the probability of premature birth is roughly 50% higher for women who smoke during pregnancy, going from around 8% to 11%.

==== Implications for the umbilical cord ====
Smoking can also impair the general development of the placenta, which is problematic because it reduces blood flow to the fetus. When the placenta does not develop fully, the umbilical cord which transfers oxygen and nutrients from the mother's blood to the placenta, cannot transfer enough oxygen and nutrients to the fetus, which will not be able to fully grow and develop. These conditions can result in heavy bleeding during delivery that can endanger mother and baby, although cesarean delivery can prevent most deaths.

==== Pregnancy-induced hypertension ====
There is limited evidence that smoking reduces the incidence of pregnancy-induced hypertension, but not when the pregnancy is with multiple babies (i.e. it has no effect on twins, triplets, etc.).

=== Effects of smoking during pregnancy on the child after birth ===
==== Low birth weight ====
Smoking during pregnancy can result in lower birth weight as well as deformities in the fetus. Smoking nearly doubles the risk of low birthweight babies. In 2004, 11.9% of babies born to smokers had low birthweight as compared to only 7.2% of babies born to nonsmokers. More specifically, infants born to smokers weigh on average 200 grams less than infants born to people who do not smoke.

The nicotine in cigarette smoke constricts the blood vessels in the placenta and carbon monoxide, which is poisonous, enters the fetus' bloodstream, replacing some of the valuable oxygen molecules carried by hemoglobin in the red blood cells. Moreover, because the fetus cannot breathe the smoke out, it has to wait for the placenta to clear it. These effects account for the fact that, on average, babies born to smoking mothers are usually born too early and have a low birth weight (less than 2.5 kilograms or 5.5 pounds), making it more likely the baby will become ill or die.

Premature and low birth weight babies face an increased risk of serious health problems as newborns have chronic lifelong disabilities such as cerebral palsy (a set of motor conditions causing physical disabilities), intellectual disabilities and learning problems.

==== Tic disorders ====
Other effects of maternal smoking during pregnancy include an increased risk for Tourette syndrome and tic disorders. There is a link between chronic tic disorders, which include Tourette syndrome and other disorders like ADHD and OCD. According to a study published in 2016 in the Journal of the American Academy of Child and Adolescent Psychiatry, there is an especially high risk for children to be born with a chronic tic disorder if their mother is a heavy smoker. Heavy smoking can be defined as ten or more cigarettes each day. With this heavy smoking, researchers have found that there is an increase in risk as high as 66% for the child to have a chronic tic disorder. Maternal smoking during pregnancy is also associated with psychiatric disorders such as ADHD. Concerning the increase risk for Tourette syndrome, there is an increased risk when two or more psychiatric disorders are also existent as maternal smoking leads to a higher chance of having a psychiatric disorder.

==== Cleft palate ====
Pregnant women who smoke may be at risk of having a child with cleft palate.

==== Sudden infant death syndrome ====
Sudden infant death syndrome (SIDS) is the sudden death of an infant that is unexplainable by the infant's history. The death also remains unexplainable upon autopsy. Infants exposed to smoke, both during pregnancy and after birth, are found to be more at risk of SIDS due to the increased levels of nicotine often found in SIDS cases. Infants exposed to smoke during pregnancy are up to three times more likely to die of SIDS than children born to non-smoking mothers.

==== Other birth defects ====
Birth defects associated with smoking during pregnancy
Defect	Odds ratio
cardiovascular/heart defects	1.09
musculoskeletal defect	1.16
limb reduction defects	1.26
missing/extra digits	1.18
clubfoot	1.28
craniosynostosis	1.33
facial defects	1.19
eye defects	1.25
orofacial clefts	1.28
gastrointestinal defects	1.27
gastroschisis	1.50
anal atresia	1.20
hernia	1.40
undescended testes	1.13
hypospadias	0.90
skin defects	0.82

Smoking can also cause other birth defects, reduced head circumference, altered brainstem development, altered lung structure, and cerebral palsy. Recently the U.S. Public Health Service reported that if all pregnant women in the United States stopped smoking, there would be an estimated 11% reduction in stillbirths and a 5% reduction in newborn deaths.

==== Future obesity ====
A recent study has proposed that maternal smoking during pregnancy can lead to future teenage obesity. While no significant differences could be found between young teenagers with smoking mothers as compared to young teenagers with nonsmoking mothers, older teenagers with smoking mothers were found to have on average 26% more body fat and 33% more abdominal fat than similar aged teenagers with non-smoking mothers. This increase in body fat may result from the effects of smoking during pregnancy, which is thought to impact fetal genetic programming in relation to obesity. While the exact mechanism for this difference is currently unknown, studies conducted on animals have indicated that nicotine may affect brain functions that deal with eating impulses and energy metabolism. These differences appear to have a significant effect on the maintenance of a healthy, normal weight. As a result of this alteration to brain function, teenage obesity can in turn lead to a variety of health problems including diabetes (a condition in which the affected individual's blood glucose level is too high and the body is unable to regulate it), hypertension (high blood pressure), and cardiovascular disease (any condition related to the heart but most commonly the thickening of arteries due to excess fat build-up).

=== Quitting during pregnancy ===
According to a 2010 study published in the European Journal of Pediatrics, the cessation of maternal smoking during any point during pregnancy reduces the risk of negative pregnancy outcomes when compared to smoking throughout the entire nine months of pregnancy, especially if it is done within the first trimester. The study found that expectant mothers who smoke at any time during the first trimester increase the risk that their child will develop birth defects, particularly congenital heart defects than expectant mothers who have never smoked. The study found that the risk posed to the expectant mother's child increases both with the quantity of cigarettes smoked, as well as the length of time during pregnancy during which the mother continues to smoke. This, per the study, renders a more positive outcome for women who cease smoking for the remainder of their pregnancy relative to women who continue to smoke.

There are many resources to help pregnant women quit smoking such as counseling and drug therapies. For non-pregnant smokers, an often-recommended aid to quitting smoking is through the use of nicotine replacement therapy (NRT) in the form of patches, gum, inhalers, lozenges, sprays or sublingual tablets. NRT, however, delivers nicotine to the expectant mother's child in utero. For some pregnant smokers, NRT might still be the most beneficial and helpful solution to quit smoking. Research in the UK has also shown that e-cigarettes could be more effective than nicotine patches, and because of this, could lead to better pregnancy outcomes. It is important that smokers talk to doctor to determine the best course of action on an individual basis.

== Smoking after pregnancy ==
Infants exposed to smoke, both during pregnancy and after birth, are found to be more at risk of sudden infant death syndrome (SIDS).

=== Breastfeeding ===
If one does continue to smoke after giving birth, however, it is still more beneficial to breastfeed than to completely avoid this practice altogether. There is evidence that breastfeeding offers protection against many infectious diseases, especially diarrhea. Even in babies exposed to the harmful effects of nicotine through breast milk, the likelihood of acute respiratory illness is significantly diminished when compared to infants whose mothers smoked but were formula fed. Regardless, the benefits of breastfeeding outweigh the risks of nicotine exposure.

=== Passive smoking ===
Passive smoking is associated with many risks to children, including, sudden infant death syndrome (SIDS), asthma, lung infections, impaired respiratory function and slowed lung growth, Crohn's disease, learning difficulties and neurobehavioral effects, an increase in tooth decay, and an increased risk of middle ear infections.

== Multigenerational effect ==
A grandmother who smokes during her daughter's pregnancy transmits an increased risk of asthma to her grandchildren, even if the second-generation mother does not smoke. The multigenerational epigenetic effect of nicotine on lung function has already been demonstrated.

== See also ==
- Health effects of tobacco
- Pollution and reproduction
- Alcohol and pregnancy
