= Sheila Eyberg =

American professor of psychology (b. 1944)

- Occupation: Professor Emeritus
- Awards: 2006 Atlantic Coast Social Behavioral and Economic Sciences Alliance Research Award; 2007 Distinguished Contributions to Education and Training Award; 2008 Distinguished Career Award; 2008 Nicholas Hobbs Award; 2009 Trailblazer Award, Child and Family Special Interest Group, Association for Cognitive and Behavioral Therapies

Academic background
- Education: University of Oregon

Academic work
- Institutions: University of Florida

Sheila Eyberg is a professor emeritus at the University of Florida where she is a part of the Department of Clinical and Health Psychology. Eyberg was born in 1944, in Omaha, Nebraska to Clarence George and Geraldine Elizabeth Eyberg. She is recognized for developing parent–child interaction therapy. She is the president and CEO of the PCIT International.

Eyberg received numerous awards including the 2009 Trailblazer Award from the Child and Family Special Interest Group of the Association for Cognitive and BehavioralTherapies, 2008 Nicholas Hobbs Award from the Society for Children and Family Policy and Practice, 2008 Distinguished Career Award from the Society of Clinical Child & Adolescent Psychology, 2007 Distinguished Contributions to Education and Training Award from the American Psychological Association, and 2006 Atlantic Coast Social Behavioral and Economic Sciences Alliance Research Award from the University of Florida. Eyberg have published and reviewed many articles throughout her career, and one of the most well known book she published was "Parent-Child Interaction Therapy Protocol" the 2011 edition.

== Biography ==
Eyberg received her Bachelors of Arts from the University of Nebraska Omaha in 1967, and her Master of Arts in Clinical Psychology from the University of Oregon in 1970 before becoming a medical psychology intern at Oregon Health and Science University in 1971. She went on to receive her PhD in psychology at the University of Oregon in 1972.

After receiving her PhD, Eyberg held many academic positions including an assistant professor of Medical Psychology at Oregon Health Science University from 1974-1985 and then a visiting associate professor of Clinical Psychology at the University of Florida from 1984–1985. Then from 1985–2005, she was professor of Clinical Health and Psychology at the University of Florida, and in 1987 she held the position of affiliate professor in pediatrics and in 1988 in psychology at the university, which she continues to hold. Later from 2003–2006, Eyberg was the University of Florida Foundation Research Professor and from 2003-2007 she was part of the Associate Chair for Research in the Department of Clinical and Health Psychology. Eyberg also held the position of distinguished professor in the University of Florida from 2005 to the present 2019.

She was also recognized for many of the positions she held in hospitals and communities through the rewards she received. For one, she was a 2005 Honorary Consultant of Community Services Division of the Tung Wah Group of Hospitals in Hong Kong, 2006 Atlantic Coast Social Behavioral and Economic Sciences Alliance Research Award from the University of Florida, and 2006 a fellow member of the American Academy of Clinical Child and Adolescent Psychology.

Eyberg's interests include clinical child psychology, behavioral assessment, parent-child interaction therapy and treatment research methodology. Eyberg is an Editorial Board Member for many different journals including Journal of Pediatric Psychology, Journal of Clinical Child Psychology, Clinical Psychology: Science and Practice, Clinical Child Psychology and Psychiatry, Clinical Child and Family Review, and Child & Family Behavior Therapy. She is the past-president of Society of Pediatric Psychology, the past-president of Society of Clinical Child and Adolescent Psychology (Division 37, APA) in 2001, the past-president of the Southeastern Psychology Association, and the past-president of the Division of Child, Youth and Family Services. She currently works at the University of Florida in the Department of Clinical and Health Psychology as a professor emeritus.

== Research ==
Eyberg had won multiple awards both in and outside of her field of study. These awards included Psi Chi, Physiology Honor Society, which is an international honor society, that aimed to recognize and promote the study of science and psychology. Other awards Eyberg received included, the past-president Society for Children and Family Policy and Practice(Division 37, APA) and Who's who of the Emerging Leaders in America. Not only had Eyberg contribute to many studies, but also took part in multiple professional service in this field. She was part of the board of director from 2005–2007 in the National Foundation for Mental Health and a member of the American Psychological Association from 1974–1984. She had also contributed in many editorial activities for the early 1990s till now 2019. These studies include the Editorial Board, Vulnerable Children and Youth Studies, and the Associate Editor of Behavior Therapy. Eyberg also published multiple books and articles related to her findings and psychology ideas. These include Child temperament: Relationship with Child Behavior Problem and Parent- Child Interactions and The Dyadic Parent-Child Interacting Coding System: Standardization and Validation.

Eyberg created a scale with colleague Donna Pincus, MA, called the Eyberg Child Behavior Inventory (ECBI) by using the Child Behavior Checklist (CBCL). Eyberg examined interparent agreement using the ECBI. This study found strong associations between maternal and paternal reports. Internal consistency was entrenched for the Preschool Behavior Questionnaire- Teacher- Completed (PBQ-T) and the Sutter- Eyberg- Student Behavior Inventory (SESBI), and stability was measured for these two tests.

In 1998, Eyberg and Elizabeth V Brestan reviewed psychological interventions for child conduct problems. In 2008, Eyberg, Melanie M Nelson and Stephen R Boggs wrote an article that reviews the literature from 1996 o 2007 and updated the 1998 Brestan and Eyberg report for children and adolescent behavior. In 1978, Sheila Eyberg and Arthur W Ross, wrote a paper that presented validation data for a behavioral inventory of child conduct problems. These studies all showed the way children behave, and showed the data of child conduct problems.

== Representative publications ==
- Boggs, S. R., Eyberg, S., & Reynolds, L. A. (1990). Concurrent validity of the Eyberg child behavior inventory. Journal of Clinical Child Psychology, 19(1), 75–78.
- Eisenstadt, T. H., McElreath, L. H., Eyberg, S., & Bodiford McNeil, C. (1994). Interparent agreement on the eyberg child behavior inventory. Child & Family Behavior Therapy, 16(1), 21–27.
- Funderburk, B. W., Eyberg, S. M., Rich, B. A., & Behar, L. (2003). Further psychometric evaluation of the Eyberg and Behar rating scales for parents and teachers of preschoolers. Early Education and Development, 14(1), 67–82.
