= Pediatric stroke =

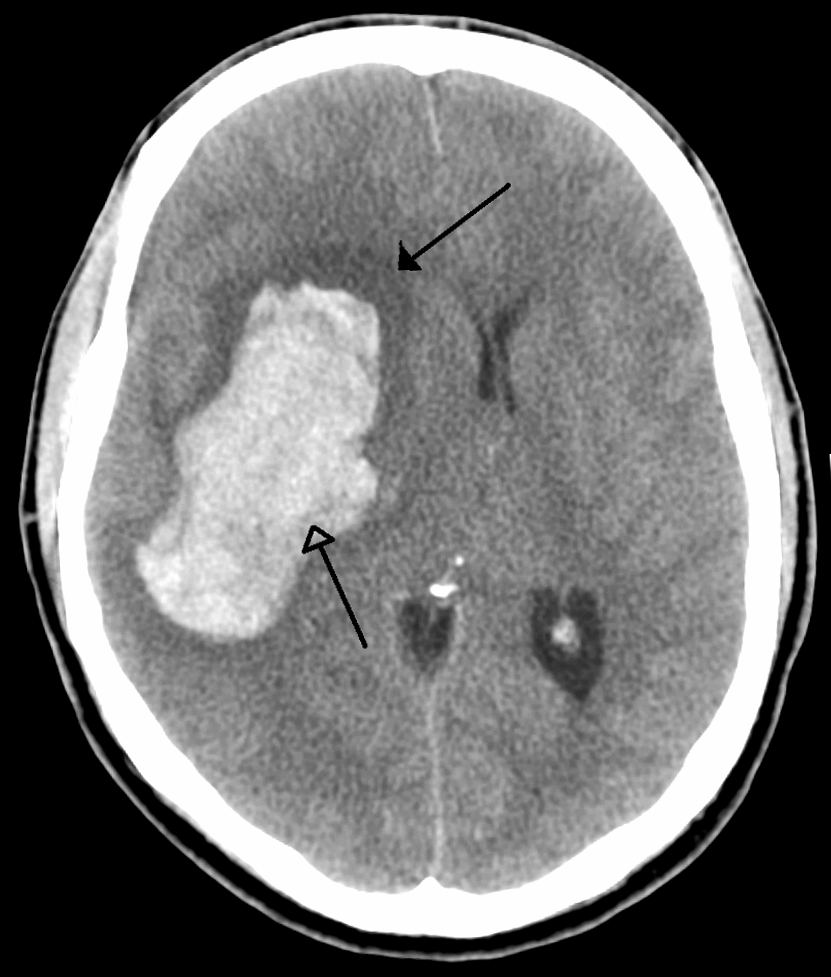
An intraparenchymal bleed (bottom arrow) with surrounding edema (top arrow)

Pediatric stroke is a stroke that occurs in children or adolescents. Stroke affects an estimated 2.5 to 13 per 100,000 children annually.

The signs and symptoms of stroke in children, infants, and newborns are different from those in adults. The causes and risk factors of stroke in children are also different from those in adults. Children have hemorrhagic strokes at the same rate in which they have ischemic strokes, while adults are more likely to have ischemic strokes. Pediatric stroke is more prevalent in males, with over 60% of pediatric strokes occurring in boys.

== Types of Strokes ==
=== Ischemic ===
In an ischemic stroke, blood supply to part of the brain is decreased, leading to dysfunction of the brain tissue in that area. There are four reasons why this might happen:

1. Thrombosis (obstruction of a blood vessel by a blood clot forming locally)
2. Embolism (obstruction due to an embolus from elsewhere in the body, see below),
3. Systemic hypoperfusion (general decrease in blood supply, e.g., in shock)
4. Venous thrombosis.

Stroke without an obvious explanation is termed "cryptogenic" (of unknown origin); this constitutes 30-40% of all ischemic strokes.

=== Hemorrhagic ===
Intracranial hemorrhage is the accumulation of blood anywhere within the skull vault. A distinction is made between intra-axial hemorrhage (blood inside the brain) and extra-axial hemorrhage (blood inside the skull but outside the brain). Intra-axial hemorrhage is due to intraparenchymal hemorrhage or intraventricular hemorrhage (blood in the ventricular system). The main types of extra-axial hemorrhage are epidural hematoma (bleeding between the dura mater and the skull), subdural hematoma (in the subdural space) and subarachnoid hemorrhage (between the arachnoid mater and pia mater). Most of the hemorrhagic stroke syndromes have specific symptoms (e.g., headache, previous head injury).

== Signs and Symptoms ==
Symptoms for pediatric stroke can vary depending on the child’s age. Infants and younger children often exhibit more subtle symptoms which can often lead to misdiagnosis or delayed treatment.

General Symptoms

Some general symptoms of pediatric stroke are common among different age groups, including:

- Hemiparesis, or a weakness on one side of the body
- Sudden or worsening headaches
- Sudden difficulty speaking, slurring of words or trouble understanding speech
- Sudden loss of vision or abnormal eye movements
- Sudden loss of balance or trouble walking

Age Specific Symptoms

Newborns

Newborns may experience symptoms such as:

- Epileptic Seizures
- Disturbance of consciousness
- Generalized Motor Disorders
- Apnea Attacks

Infants

Infants may experience symptoms such as:

- Keeping one hand in a fist position
- Preferred use of one hand
- Focal Epileptic Seizures
- Impaired Consciousness

Children Older than Three Years

In children three years and older, symptoms may include:

- Sensory disturbances
- Psychomotor Agitation

== Prognosis ==
The prognosis for pediatric stroke survivors varies among individuals. Children with pediatric or perinatal stroke may not have long term issues, but other individuals may experience the following outcomes:

- Cerebral Palsy (often Hemiplegic Cerebral Palsy/Hemiplegia)
- Epilepsy
- Vision Loss
- Hearing Loss
- Language Disorders
- Behavioral Disorders

== Treatment of Pediatric Stroke ==
- If symptoms of pediatric stroke seizure are seen, the infant should be taken to the hospital immediately for assessment, diagnosis, and treatment.
- Medications and other treatments may be recommended to help treat the symptoms (e.g. to control seizures) or correct the cause of the stroke, such as rehydration, antibiotics for meningitis, and medication or surgery to correct heart abnormalities.
