= Sterling Clarren =

American medical researcher

Sterling K. Clarren is one of the world's leading researchers into fetal alcohol spectrum disorder (FASD), an umbrella term encompassing fetal alcohol syndrome (FAS), alcohol-related neurodevelopmental disorder, static encephalopathy:alcohol exposed and prenatal alcohol exposed. He was the Robert A. Aldrich Professor of Pediatrics at the University of Washington School of Medicine in Seattle, Washington, and doctor for the university's FAS diagnostic and prevention clinic prior to becoming the CEO and Scientific Director of the Canada FASD Research Network.

Clarren has studied FASD since 1975 and helped to establish the definitions of FAS and FAE. He wrote the first article on the neuropathology of FAS, and developed the first non-human primate model for studying dose-response. He has testified about FASD before the United States Congress and the Washington State Legislature.

== Education ==
Clarren received his bachelor's from Yale University and his MD from the University of Minnesota. His postgraduate training was in pediatrics, and fellowship training was in neuroembryology, teratology, and dysmorphology at the University of Washington.

== Professional life ==
Clarren is a fellow of the American Academy of Pediatrics, the American Association for the Advancement of Science, a past president of the FAS study group for the Research Society on Alcoholism, past president of the West Coast Teratology Society, and a member of the Society for Pediatric Research, New York Academy of Science, the Teratology Society.

He has received funding from the National Institute on Alcohol Abuse and Alcoholism, the Centers for Disease Control, the Glaser Foundation, and the March of Dimes. He has published over 100 scholarly papers.

Clarren is currently working as a clinical professor for the Centre for Community Child Health Research at the Child and Family Research Institute in Vancouver, B.C., Canada.

== Papers ==
- Clarke, MP, Tough SC, Hicks M, Cook J, Foulkes E, Clarren SK. (2005). "Attitudes and approaches of Canadian providers to preconception counseling and the prevention of fetal alcohol spectrum disorders." Journal of FAS International.
- Clarke, MP, Tough SC, Hicks M, Cook J, Foulkes E, Clarren SK. (2005). "Approaches of Canadian providers the diagnosis of fetal alcohol spectrum disorders." Journal of FAS International.
- Astley, SJ, Stachowiak J, Clarren SK, Clausen C. (2002). "Application of the fetal alcohol syndrome facial photographic screening tool in a foster care population." J. Pediatrics, 141:712-17.
- Clarren, SK, Randels SP, Sanderson M, Fineman RM. (2001). "Screening for Fetal Alcohol Syndrome in primary schools – a feasibility study." Teratology, 63:3-10.
- Miller, RI, Clarren SK. (2000). "Long term developmental outcomes in patients with deformational plagiocephaly." Pediatrics, 105:417(e26).

== Books and chapters ==
- Clarren, SK. "Alcohol teratogenesis and fetal alcohol syndrome." In L. Osborn, T. DeWitt, L. First. (eds.). Comprehensive Pediatrics. St. Louis : Harcourt Press, in press 2004.
- Clarren SK. "Fetal alcohol syndrome & fetal alcohol spectrum disorders." In: M.L. Wolrich. (ed.). Disorders of Development & Learning. Hamilton, Ontario : BC Decker, 2003.
- Clarren SK, Astley SJ. "Fetal Alcohol Syndrome". In: S.B. Cassidy and J. Allanson J. (eds.). Clinical Management of Common Genetic Syndromes. New York : Wiley and Sons, 2001.
- Clarren, SK. "Attention deficit hyperactivity disorder in the context of alcohol exposure in utero". In: P. Accardo, T.A. Blondis, B. Whitman, M.A. Stein. (eds.). Attention Deficits and Hyperactivity in Children and Adults, 2nd Edition. New York : Marcel Dekker, Inc., 2000.
- Astley SJ, Clarren SK. Diagnostic Guide for Fetal Alcohol Syndrome and Related Conditions: The 4-Digit Diagnostic Code. 2nd Edition University of Washington Press, Seattle, Washington, 1999.
