= Parent–child interaction therapy =

Intervention developed by Sheila Eyberg

Parent–child interaction therapy (PCIT) is an intervention developed by Sheila Eyberg (1988) to treat children between ages 2 and 7 with disruptive behavior problems. PCIT is an evidence-based treatment (EBT) for young children with behavioral and emotional disorders that places emphasis on improving the quality of the parent-child relationship and changing parent-child interaction patterns.

Disruptive behavior is the most common reason for referral of young children for mental health services and can vary from relatively minor infractions such as talking back to significant acts of aggression. The most commonly treated Disruptive Behavior Disorders may be classified as Oppositional Defiant Disorder (ODD) or Conduct Disorder (CD), depending on the severity of the behavior and the nature of the presenting problems. The disorders often co-occur with Attention-Deficit Hyperactivity Disorder (ADHD). It uses a unique combination of behavioral therapy, play therapy, and parent training to teach more effective discipline techniques and improve the parent–child relationship.

PCIT is typically administered once a week, with 1-hour sessions, for 10-14 sessions total and consists of two treatment phases: Child-Directed Interaction (CDI) and Parent-Directed Interaction (PDI). The CDI component focuses on improving the quality of the parent-child relationship, which will help promote changes in behavior. This sets the foundation for the PDI stage, which continues to encourage appropriate play while also focusing on a structured and consistent approach to discipline.

== History ==
PCIT was derived from several theories, including attachment theory, social learning theory, and parenting styles theory.

=== Attachment theory ===
According to attachment theory by Ainsworth, “sensitive and responsive parenting” during infancy and toddlerhood leads the child to develop an expectation that their needs can be met by the parent. Thus, parents who show their young children greater warmth and are more responsive and sensitive to their needs promote a sense of security that they can later apply to relationships with others. This can also help with more effective emotion regulation. Children who are referred to clinics for externalizing behaviors are more likely than non-referred children to display distress when separated from the parent and to display indicators of an insecure attachment to their parent.

The Child Directed Interaction (CDI) component of the PCIT applies attachment theory through its goal to “restructure the parent-child relationship and provide a secure attachment for the child”. The CDI component makes use of the idea that parents can have a dramatic effect on their child's behavior, especially during the early preschool years. This is a critical period where children are more responsive to their parent's and less so to other influences such as teachers or peers.

=== Social learning theory ===
Social learning theory suggests that new behaviors can be learned by watching and imitating the behaviors of others. Patterson (1975) further expands on this and proposes that child behavior problems are “inadvertently established or maintained by dysfunctional parent-child interactions”. There can be a “coercive interaction cycle” between parent and child where both try to control the behavior of the other. Behaviors such as arguing and aggression in children are reinforced by parent behaviors (e.g., withdrawal of demands), but negative parent behaviors can subsequently be reinforced by negative child behaviors. In sum, children can learn many behaviors from their parents’ feedback, but this can result in negative externalizing behaviors, as well. The PDI component targets this cycle specifically by establishing consistent parenting behaviors that encourage the desired behavior in children.

=== Parenting style theory ===
According to Diana Baumrind’s parenting style theory (year link citation) found that the authoritative parenting style leads to the healthiest outcomes for children transitioning into adolescence. This style combines responsive and nurturing interactions with clear communication and firm discipline. The influence of this theory can be seen particularly in the PDI treatment phase where parents are taught to use direct commands to increase desired behavior, along with other positive and nurturing behaviors.

== Structure of the PCIT ==
Eyberg’s original paper (1988) thoroughly describes each assessment and treatment phase of the PCIT and includes suggestions for applying the therapy.

First, parents attend a training session during which the therapist explains each rule and its rationale. Each parent is also taught through one-on-one role play interactions with the therapist. Parents are also given a handout at the end of the session that summarizes the basic directions so they can review it at home.

After this training session, the sessions that follow will include the child. The sessions are held in a playroom, with the child playing with one parent at a time. Meanwhile, the therapist and the other parent will be observing the play through a one-way mirror or video system. The therapist can provide immediate feedback and suggestions through a “bug-in-ear” device or sit in the room to do the coaching. At the end of the session, the therapist discusses the child's progress, using summary sheets that parents can use to guide their interactions during practice sessions at home. These practice sessions serve as a “homework assignment” for parents, during which they practice the interaction with their child for five minutes a day, using homework sheets to track progress. The treatment begins with the Child-Directed Interaction phase, then is followed by the Parent-Directed Interaction (PDI) phase.

=== Child-Directed Interaction (CDI) ===
According to Eyberg (1988), the parent's goal during this stage is to follow the child's lead during play while being sure to follow the “Don’t Rules” and “Do Rules of CDI”. The child should be free to lead the activity and make their own decisions about what and how to play. By letting their children take control of the play, the parents help their child develop autonomy and independence.

==== Don’t rules of CDI ====
According to Eyberg (1988), the Don't rules help parents step back and encourage child-led play by avoiding commands, questions, and criticisms. Commands, or instructions, would take the lead away from the child could also introduce potential disagreements into the play. Parents are also encouraged to not ask questions. This can include questions such as “How about putting the toys away?” which are actually implied commands. The concern about asking questions is that they may come off as accusatory (“Why did you choose that toy?”) or take the conversation to an “adult” level instead of letting the child play freely and naturally. The general idea is that questions provide little information, so they have limited usefulness in therapy. The third “don’t” rule is to avoid criticizing. Though criticisms can range from mild to blatant attacks on the child, criticisms in general can lead to damaging effects on the child's self-esteem. As children learn which behaviors are good or bad, they rely on what their parents say about them and believe it. Criticisms may also frustrate or anger the child and can lead to a counterattack. Taken together, criticisms are not only unproductive in therapy, but also are threats to the positive relationship that the PCIT emphasizes.

==== Do rules of CDI ====
According to Eyberg (1988), the Do rules of CDI that promote positive behavior throughout play. The first Do is to describe what the child is doing during the activity. Doing this may seem unnatural at first, but describing serves a few purposes: it allows the child to (1) lead play, (2) improve attention towards independent activities, (3) clarify the activity and encourage the child to further elaborate the play, and (4) help teach the child different concepts in a positive way. For example, the child learns through positive feedback (“you found the red one”) instead of coercion (“find the red one”).

The second Do is imitation. Eyberg recommends that the parents “sit close and do the same thing as the child”. The parent can add to the child's play, or do something similar, but the focus should still remain on the child's style of play. The attention that imitation can demonstrate can show the child that the parent is interested and believes what they are doing is important. Imitation may even lead to the child imitating the parent. The aim is that through the parent-child play, the child can learn cooperative play skills that they can one day use with other children.

Parents are encouraged to reflect what the child says during play, the third Do of CDI. This helps parents practice listening to their child. For example, when the child says “The car is fast,” the parent might say “Yes, the car is fast”. These reflections show that the parent understands and accepts what the child is saying. Additionally, using reflective statements can improve the child's vocabulary and grammar by providing clarity to the child's thoughts. It also gives the child an opportunity to agree or disagree with the parent's understanding and elaborate if needed.

Praise is the fourth Do, and is very important because it can make children feel good and increase warmth, an important goal of the CDI. Praise statements such as “Good job!” show the child that their creations and actions are important. This is important because children tend to believe the things parents say to them, whether they be positive or negative. The manual specifies two types of praise. “Labeled praise” statements specify exactly what the parent likes about their behavior. For example, saying “You did a beautiful job of drawing that picture” not only teaches children that they did something the parent liked, but also teaches them what they did to earn that praise. Because PCIT can be used from ages 2 through 7, coaching takes into account the developmental differences at each age and teaches parents to be mindful of those differences. Parents are encouraged to praise and reflect all attempts of their child to verbally communicate, as speech skills are concurrently developing.

=== Parent-Directed Interaction (PDI) ===
According to Eyberg (1988), during the PDI component, parents continue the skills learned in the CDI, but this time they are taught new skills to lead the play. These skills include giving verbal directions and applying the appropriate consequences to the child in a fair manner that the child can understand clearly. These steps are practiced at the clinic, and parents are not encouraged to practice at home until they feel confident.

Eyberg (1988) states that he first step is to give clear, direct commands for the desired behavior from the child and to avoid indirect commands, which can be too vague and confusing to the child. For example, “Put this red table in the house” is a direct command. However, an indirect command such as “Will you color the leaves green?” can be interpreted by the child as a genuine question. Another example of an indirect command is “Let’s clean up the toys”, which does not indicate clearly if both the parent and child will be doing the task or how much of the task the child will do themselves. Additionally, phrases that are too general, such as “Be good”, should be avoided, as it does not provide enough information about what exactly is expected of the child. In sum, clear statements should be used towards the child so they can understand easily without getting confused.

Eyberg (1988) provides some guidelines for giving direct commands. First, the commands should be stated positively and should tell the child what to do, rather than what not to do. For example, “Put your hands in your lap” should be used instead of “Stop grabbing the toys”. Secondly, the command should be one that is age-appropriate for the child. For example, telling a 2-year-old “Tie your shoe” would be considered not age-appropriate. Lastly, the command should require only one behavior at a time. This way, children need not remember long strings of orders in a single command.

The second step of PDI involves labeled praise when the child displays the desired behavior. For example, “I like it when you do what I tell you to do so quickly!” tells the child what specific action pleased the parent and this praise will help increase that desired behavior.

The third step is to initiate time-out whenever the child is noncompliant. Eyberg states that noncompliance will be reinforced by both parental attention and when the child is able to get out of something they do not want to do. An example may be a warning followed by a three-minute time-out.

Eventually, as these skills are mastered by the parent, the commands can begin to address relevant behavioral problems the child may be displaying. The approach depends on the treatment goal. For example, if the goal is to increase a certain desired behavior, the parent must break the skill down into simpler parts that can be built on through practice and labeled praise until the child masters it.

== Assessments ==
=== Dyadic Parent-Child Interaction System (DPICS) ===
DPICS is an observational system originally created for conduct problem families. It uses direct observations of behaviors to assess parent-child interactions. DPICS has undergone three revisions since its first edition published in 1981, and now includes a research and clinical version of the coding system. The DPICS categories serve as indicators of relationship quality, measured by verbal and physical behaviors during social interactions. Examples of parent behavior categories are direct and indirect commands, behavior descriptions, reflections, labeled praise, unlabeled praise, questions, and negative talk. Child behavior categories include comply, noncomply, no opportunity to comply, physical positive and negative, yell, whine, smart talk, laugh, and destructive behavior. The clinical version of the manual reduces the number of parent and child codes to be more practical for clinicians to use (e.g., only compliance, noncompliance, and no opportunity to comply are used as child responses in the clinical manual)

=== Eyberg Child Behavior Inventory (ECBI) ===
The ECBI is a 36-item behavior scale that is used to track disruptive behaviors in children. It was constructed from data indicating the most typical problem behaviors reported by parents of conduct problem children. The measure includes two scales: Intensity and Problem. Parents report Intensity by rating how frequent each item occurs. The Problem scale asks parents “Is this behavioral problem for you?” to which parents respond “yes” or “no”. This measure can be used for children aged 2 to 16.

== Applications ==
=== Behavior problems ===
Disruptive behavior problems are the leading reason for children's referrals to mental health professionals. and PCIT was first created to target these behaviors. Results from a randomized controlled trial examining the efficacy of PCIT on clinic referred children with diagnoses of Oppositional Defiant Disorder indicated that compared to the waitlist control group, parents interacted more positively with their children and were more successful at gaining compliance. Additionally, parents in the treatment group reported decreased parenting stress and more control. Parents also reported significant improvements in their child's behavior following treatment.

Similar results have been shown in a quasi-experimental study by Boggs and colleagues (2004) that evaluated families who completed the treatment program compared to families who dropped out of the study before completion. For those who completed treatment, parents reported positive changes 10–30 months following treatment in their child's behavior and their parenting stress. Those who dropped out of treatment early did not show significant changes.

In a meta-analysis that conducted a comprehensive review of PCIT's efficacy with children diagnosed with ADHD, ODD, or CD, PCIT was found to be an “efficacious intervention for improving externalizing behavior in children with disruptive behavior disorders”. Another meta-analysis that focused on parenting stress in addition to child behaviors as outcomes found PCIT to have a “beneficial impact on parents’ and primary caregivers’ perceptions of all outcomes examined, including child externalizing behaviors, child's temperament and self-regulatory abilities, frequency of behavior problems, the difficulty of parent-child interactions, and parent overall distress”.

The treatment effects of PCIT can also be demonstrated in school settings, despite the treatment program being lab- or home-based. In a study by Funderburk and colleagues (2009), school assessments were administered at 12 months and 18 months following PCIT. At 12 months, results indicated that children in the treatment group maintained their post-treatment improvements, improving within “normal range of conduct problems” compared to the control group. However, though maintaining improvements with compliance, the 18-month followup indicated some declines into the range of levels before treatment.

=== Child maltreatment ===
Studies have examined the effectiveness of PCIT with families at risk or engaged in child maltreatment. Evidence suggests that factors such as coercive patterns of parent-child interactions, less sensitivity towards the child, and insecure child attachment can be risks for child maltreatment. In a randomized controlled trial composing of 12-session PCIT, mothers reported less internalizing and externalizing behaviors in children in the PCIT group. Additionally, mothers reported less stress, more positive verbalizations and maternal sensitivity. Other studies have found similar results, including a reduction of abuse risk post-treatment compared to the waitlist control.

==== Foster care ====
PCIT may also be an effective intervention for maltreated children in foster care settings. Because children with behavioral problems in foster care are more likely to have multiple foster care placements and mental health problems, the interventions that improve foster parents’ skills in managing children's difficult behaviors are needed. Findings from a study comparing foster parents and their foster children to non-abusive biological parents and their children demonstrated PCIT's effectiveness in reducing child behavior problems and caregiver distress following treatment for both groups.

=== Depression ===
The PCIT has been adapted to treat major depressive disorder in preschool-aged children, called the PCIT-ED. The Emotional Development module (ED) was added to target emotion development impairments in very young children, specifically. Its goal is to help children regulate and understand their own emotions more effectively. The two phases of PCIT, CDI and PDI, are retained, but are shortened to six session per phase. Parents are taught skills that help their child in identifying and managing their emotions. For example, this may involve recognizing the child's “triggers” and using relaxation techniques to calm them. Often, parents may try to stop the child's expression of negative emotion, but during ED, parents are taught to tolerate these negative emotions so their child can learn to regulate them.

The pilot study of the PCIT-ED was an open trial study that examined a group of preschool children with depression, assessing symptoms before and after treatment. This study showed decreased depressive symptoms in children, and most children no longer met major depressive disorder criteria upon completion of treatment. Additionally, children improved their coping skills, prosocial behaviors, and thought processes. The first randomized controlled trial that compared PCIT-ED to psychoeducation in depressed preschoolers and their caregivers also showed significant improvement two weeks posttreatment for the PCIT-ED group in emotion development, child executive functioning, and parenting stress.

=== Separation anxiety disorder ===
Separation anxiety disorder (SAD) is the most common anxiety disorder in children which is characterized by an “excessive fear response to real or imagined separation from a caregiver”. PCIT involves many parenting skills that are important in reducing children's anxiety, such as command training, selective attention, reinforcement, and shaping the child's behavior.

Pilot study results by Pincus and colleagues (2008) evaluating the efficacy of PCIT in 10 young children with SAD showed that did not improve to nonclinical levels posttreatment, however there was improvement in the severity of SAD. Pincus and colleagues (2008) also proposed an adaptation to the PCIT that would include the Bravery-Directed Interaction (BDI) phase. The BDI phase includes a psychoeducational component for the parents about anxiety. It also includes a gradual exposure to the separation situations the child fears. This exposure is key for all anxiety disorders. The BDI focuses on establishing a sense of control in the child by giving them the freedom to choose one exposure activity a week from the “Bravery Ladder” homework assignment, rather than having their parent choose. An initial randomized controlled trial has been conducted to evaluate the modified PCIT, comparing its efficacy to a waitlist control group. It seeks to assess the maintenance of change at 3, 6, and 12 months posttreatment. Preliminary results of study show decreased severity of SAD post-treatment.

=== Domestic and interparental violence exposure ===
Children are at an especially high risk for externalizing and internalizing problems following interparental violence-exposure or domestic violence. Borrego and colleagues (2008) have provided rationale for the use of PCIT with domestic violence-exposed women and their children, proposing that the parent training component may be very beneficial for mothers who may have “low levels of confidence in their own parenting capabilities and may also have low self-esteem”. Additionally, Borrego and colleagues (2008) emphasized that because PCIT is relationship-based, it may improve the quality of the mother-child relationship, developing a secure attachment between mother and child, and may lead to a decrease in the severity of trauma symptoms experienced by both.

One study by Timmer and colleagues (2010) compared the effectiveness of PCIT in reducing behavior problems in maltreated children exposed to interparental violence (IPV) and similar children with no history of IPV-exposure. Results indicated that there were decreases in behavior problems and caregivers’ distress from pre- to posttreatment in both the IPV-exposed and non-exposed groups. However, there was no significant difference between variations of IPV exposure.

== Delivery of treatment ==
=== In-home ===
The implementation of PCIT in the home has been examined in order to increase accessibility. Protocol was followed as closely as possible, with the exception that treatment was conducted within the home. Some modifications may be necessary in this setting. For example, the bug-in-ear (a small, wireless earpiece) was used for coaching parents could not be used. Instead, therapists were present in the same room for coaching, typically behind the caregiver, giving discrete feedback. Therapists were able to conduct DPICS observations, however these observations were coded live.

The in-home administration of PCIT in a single-subject study by Ware and colleagues (2012) has yielded promising results, such as decrease in caregiver use of negative behavior and increase in use of positive behavior and praise posttreatment. PCIT has also shown to improve child outcomes as well. PCIT completers were found to have significantly lower risk of child abuse compared to noncompleters, decrease in child behavior problems, and increased child compliance posttreatment.

There are certain advantages that come with in-home PCIT. For example, therapists are able to take advantage of more authentic, “real life” behaviors that may not be accurately captured within a laboratory or clinic setting. Additionally, in-home PCIT can combat attrition, a problem commonly faced by therapists.

This approach has potential drawbacks, as well. For example, because homes vary greatly across families, it is much more difficult for therapists control, unlike a laboratory or clinic setting. It may also be more difficult to keep children within the room and within the therapist's sight, as the child has more freedom to “escape” if needed. These problems can be avoided by deciding beforehand which room the therapy will take place and by minimizing potential distractions. Availability of resources can be an issue as well, particularly when the treatment requires use of age-appropriate toys that are typically controlled by the therapist in clinical settings. In homes, there may be limited options of activities. However, talking to the parent beforehand about what they might prefer to play with may be helpful, and the therapist can plan to bring the toys needed.

=== Community-based ===
PCIT implemented in the community involves administration in community settings such as in the home, mental health services agencies, or family services agencies. Few studies have examined the effectiveness of PCIT in community settings, however one implementation through community agencies has shown decreases in behavior problems, improved parent-child interactions, reduced parental stress in a four-family clinical case study posttreatment. Additionally, a study by Lanier and colleagues (2014) found PCIT to be effective for maltreatment prevention in a group of families receiving PCIT at posttreatment followup.

=== Internet-based ===
In an effort to increase accessibility and address obstacles of receiving treatment, especially in underserved communities, an internet-based delivery of PCIT has been proposed and tested. This method uses video conferencing, webcams, and wireless earpieces, allowing for therapists to continue to provide real-time feedback to caregivers, right from the comfort of their home. Advantages of this method include the ability to generalize findings better because families were treated in natural settings, which are the settings in which child disruptive behaviors are most likely to manifest.

Availability of resources can pose as a problem when implementing this method of PCIT. Success is dependent on families owning, or being provided, microphones, ear pieces, webcams, computers, and Wi-Fi hotspots. In homes that lack Wi-Fi or have suboptimal internet connections, real-time feedback from therapists may be affected. Treatment providers may be able to provide the necessary equipment for families to borrow, however this depends heavily on the availability of grant funds.

A randomized trial has been conducted with the Internet-Delivered Parent-Child Interaction Therapy (I-PCIT) and has shown support for its effectiveness in treating children with disruptive behavior disorders. Parents perceived less barriers to treatment when compared to those receiving clinic-based PCIT. This study demonstrated decreases in children's symptoms and burden to parents in a randomized clinical trial compared to a waitlist control group, and to traditional in-office PCIT administration. Additionally, roughly half of the children in the study no longer met the diagnostic criteria for disruptive behavior disorder.

=== Robot-Assisted proposal ===
The use of social robots to support PCIT has been explored as a potential means of assisting parents during home-based practice. Vincze and Niitsuma (2024) proposed a social robot designed to act as an "interaction stimulator" during CDI sessions. The proposed system uses real-time speech processing and classification based on DPICS principles to quantify parent–child communication. Based on the results of the real-time analysis, the robot is designed to provide behavioral responses intended to encourage positive communication and engagement. The approach aims to provide parents with additional feedback and support when practicing PCIT skills outside supervised therapy sessions.

== Criticisms ==
In addition to the time-out component, Eyberg (1988) also recommended swatting child's bottom and other physical punishment as a form of discipline, however in a study by Timmer and colleagues (2005), physical punishment was not found to be necessary and has since been removed from the PCIT protocol. Timmer (2005) further suggested that it did not add anything and suggested a more hands-off approach to parenting.

Attrition rates among families receiving PCIT are an ongoing concern. In a meta-analysis by Thomas and Zimmer-Gembeck (2012), attrition rates ranged from 18 to 35% among studies that reported attrition.

== See also ==
- Behavior analysis of child development
