= Perinatal stroke =

Stroke prior to or soon after birth

Perinatal stroke is a disease where an infant has a stroke between the 140th day of the gestation period and the 28th postpartum day, affecting up to 1 in 2300 live births. This disease is further divided into three subgroups, namely neonatal arterial ischemic stroke, neonatal cerebral sinovenous ischemic stroke, and presumed perinatal stroke. Several risk factors contribute to perinatal stroke including birth trauma, placental abruption, infections, and the mother's health.

Detection and diagnosis of perinatal stroke are often delayed due to prenatal onset or inadequacy of neonatal signs and symptoms. A child may be asymptomatic in the early stages of life and may develop common signs of perinatal stroke such as seizures, poor coordination, and speech delays as they get older. Diagnostic tests such as magnetic resonance imaging, electroencephalogram, and blood tests are conducted when doctors suspect the patients have developed signs of a perinatal stroke.

The prognosis of this disease is associated with the severity and the development of the symptoms. This disease can be treated by anticoagulant and anticonvulsant drugs, surgical procedures, and therapeutic hypothermia, depending on the condition of the patient.

== Types of perinatal stroke ==
=== Neonatal arterial ischemic stroke ===
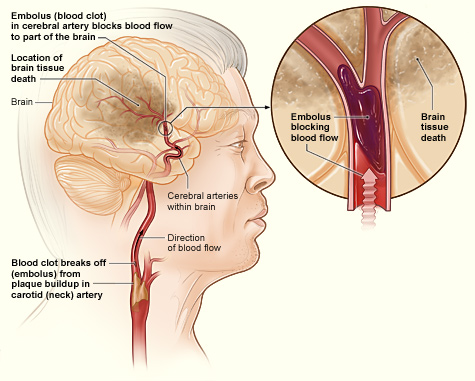
Ischemic stroke

A neonatal arterial ischemic stroke occurs when the blood vessels of the brain are partly or completely blocked. This situation normally affects the middle cerebral arterial region. This subgroup of perinatal stroke affects between 5 and 43 babies in 100,000 live births. A recent multinational cohort study showed that stroke or succeeding deficits caused the death of 65% of the patients who were suffering from neonatal arterial ischemic stroke. Risk factors such as maternal fever, gestational diabetes and having a record of miscarriage experiences will increase the occurrence of neonatal arterial ischemic stroke. However, the definitive etiology of neonatal arterial ischemic stroke remains uncertain to date.

=== Neonatal cerebral sinovenous ischemic stroke ===
Neonatal cerebral sinovenous ischemic stroke is a disease in the cerebral venous system caused by thrombosis. Thrombosis in this region will hinder outflow from the venous system, causing a surge in the central venous pressure. This will lead to intracranial hypertension, cerebral ischemia or wide spreading hemorrhage which may result in a permanent neurologic deficit or mortality. This disease has an incidence rate of between 2.6 and 2.69 in every 100,000 babies per year. However, mortality due to neonatal cerebral sinovenous ischemic stroke is rather rare.

=== Presumed perinatal stroke ===
Presumed perinatal stroke is a condition when the stroke is only diagnosed after the neonatal period and does not have any significance in neurological examination within the 28 days after birth. The majority of infants who were later diagnosed with presumed perinatal stroke were free of symptoms during the neonatal period. The timing that a stroke occurs varies between the 140th day of the pregnancy period and the 28th postpartum day among those infants suffering from presumed perinatal stroke. These infants normally suffer from arterial strokes or white matter venous infarctions that may have variability in underlying mechanisms, risk factors, and outcomes.

== Causes ==
Perinatal stroke is correlated with various risk factors in infants including birth trauma, placental disorders, infections, and the mother's health.

Birth trauma and mechanical trauma to the fetal head and neck can cause stroke by damaging arteries: Some children may have arteries that are damaged by trauma or inflammation leaving a rough or jagged inner lining where blood clots can get stuck. These clots can build up enough so that eventually the artery is clogged and no blood can flow through. In addition to vascular damage, trauma to the fetal head from excessive uterine activity, manipulation, pressure, and forceps or vacuum application via direct occlusion or vasospasm can cause perinatal ischemic stroke.

Hypoxic-ischemic encephalopathy (HIE), also known as birth asphyxia, arises from oxygen deprivation in the womb. HIE results from placental abruption, umbilical cord problems, uterine rupture, or the failure to identify abnormal heart rate by the medical staff.

Placental disorders associated with perinatal stroke range from anatomical (site or degree of implantation) such as placenta previa to placenta-maternal effects (fetal erythroblastosis).

Infections like chorioamnionitis cause an infection in the maternal blood, commonly leading to premature birth and the newborn experiencing brain damage, meningitis, or death. Other infections include neonatal sepsis, where the immune system reacts by affecting their organs and tissues resulting in meningitis, seizures, and cerebral palsy.

The mother's health is also associated with perinatal stroke, some factors include blood clotting disorders, congenital heart diseases, and prenatal cocaine exposure. Blood clotting disorders such as Hemophilia A and B result from low clotting factor quantities leading to heavy bleeding. In congenital heart disease, perinatal stroke results from the disruption of blood flow from obstruction of a blood vessel in the brain.

However, various infants still experience perinatal stroke after a normal pregnancy and studies have shown that sometimes there is a lack of direct cause and many infants are idiopathic.

== Signs and symptoms ==
Neural activity during a seizure

Many infants are asymptomatic until they are older. Symptoms such as speech delays, balance difficulties, and asymmetrical weakness become more apparent and are signs that they experienced a stroke. In asymmetrical weakness, infants favor one hand over the other due to cerebral palsy which arises from lesions to the central nervous system. Infants who do give indications of stroke in the womb or shortly after birth commonly experience seizures. When an infant has a seizure, they experience jerking in the face, legs, or arms, alongside delayed breathing. Seizures are mostly caused by hypoxic-ischemic encephalopathy (HIE) or perinatal asphyxia.

== Diagnosis ==
Doctors can use diagnostic tests to determine if an infant is having a stroke. After a clinical presentation of a stroke, the first diagnostic tests used are imaging techniques. Further diagnostic tests such as EEG, echo, blood tests, and genetic tests are carried out depending on the symptoms portrayed by the newborn.

=== Imaging techniques ===
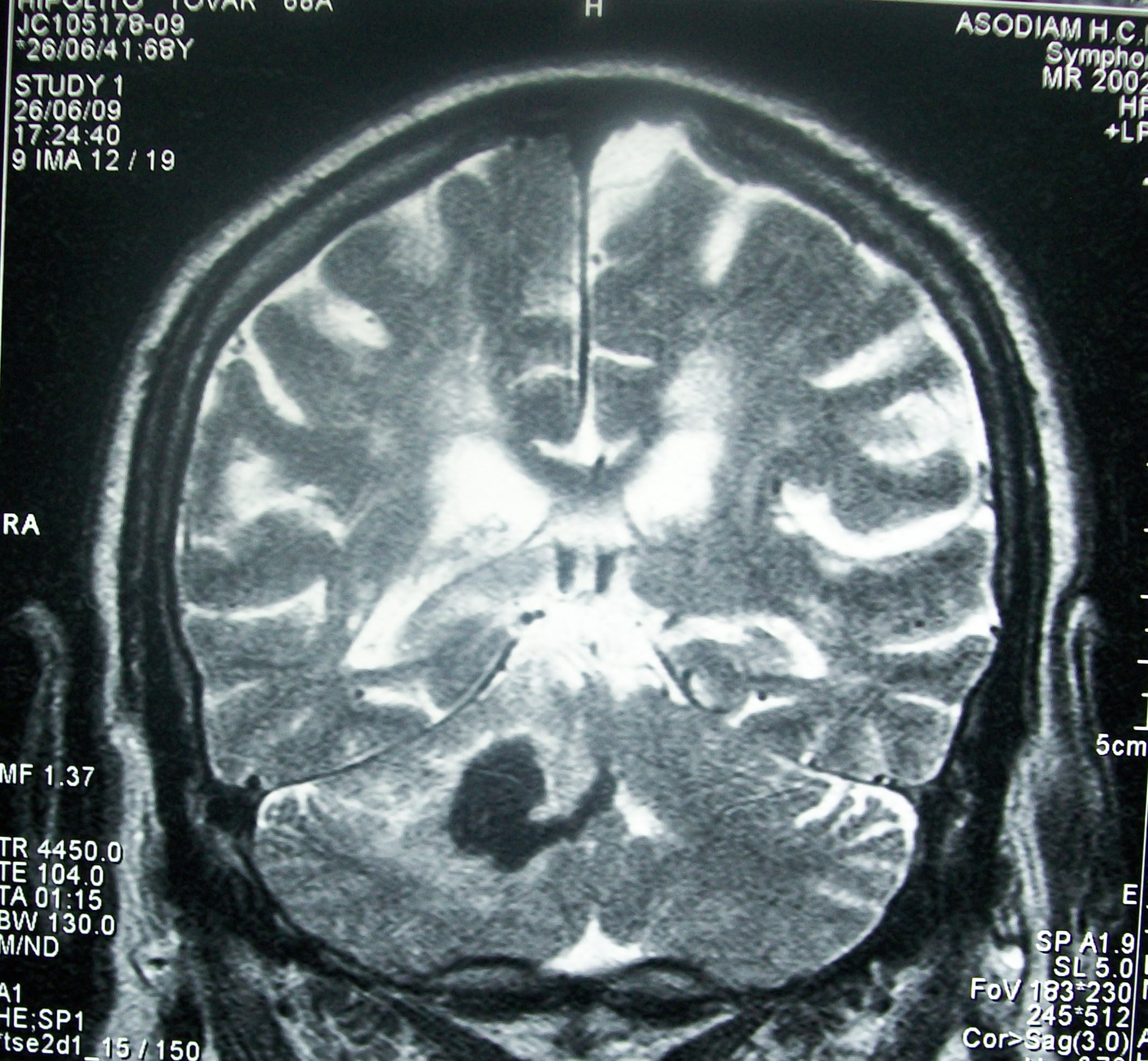
Magnetic resonance image of brain after stroke

Perinatal stroke can be diagnosed with medical imaging techniques that present the brain's image. The usage of diffusion-weighted imaging with magnetic resonance imaging is effective for early diagnosis of perinatal stroke. Computerized tomography (CT) is also a commonly used diagnostic technique for this disease. These medical imaging techniques can show bleeding or blockage in the brain and detect damage caused by ischemic stroke or hemorrhages to the brain tissues. Magnetic resonance imaging is clinically preferred to computerized tomography as it can highlight the brain's blood flow. In addition, perinatal stroke is challenging to classify on computerized tomography as the neonatal brain has higher water content. However, in certain situations, such as the inability to transport unstable infants with severe respiratory or cardiac disorders from the intensive care unit, cranial ultrasound is used as an alternative to magnetic resonance imaging. Cranial ultrasound can identify intracranial hemorrhage, intraventricular hemorrhage, and large cerebral sinus venous thrombosis along with the brain's blood flow.

=== Electroencephalogram ===
Seizures associated with perinatal stroke are normally focal and include rhythmic contractions of the arm or leg. Findings on EEG portray slow, isolated spike-wave patterns from the region of the dead tissue resulting from blood supply failure.

=== Echocardiogram ===
Abnormality in the heart rate can be detected by an echocardiogram which creates a detailed image of the heart by utilising sound waves. This method locates the clot's source in the heart, which migrates to the brain and results in a stroke.

=== Blood tests ===
Blood tests examine various factors leading to perinatal strokes such as signs of infections, clotting conditions, and coagulation disorders. These include tests for clotting disorders such as thrombophilia and inflammatory disorders.

=== Genetic tests ===
Genetic tests examine the hereditary risk factors for blood clots leading to stroke. Genetic screening is recommended for patients who have a family history of thrombophilia.

== Prognosis ==
Perinatal stroke's severity determines its prognosis. 61% of infants who experienced a perinatal stroke are also diagnosed with cerebral palsy. While, infants with greater stroke severities and involvement of structures such as the precentral gyrus and Wernicke's area have a critical prognosis. Infants who survived a perinatal stroke may develop disabilities like cerebral palsy, sensory dysfunctions, ADHD, and visual or hearing difficulties. As the prognosis is correlated with the progression of the symptoms, treatments allow the infants to recover quickly and reduces the chance of them suffering any long-term disabilities.

== Treatments ==
In clinical practice, there are only limited treatments available for treating perinatal stroke. Medications are commonly prescribed to alleviate some symptoms caused by the disease, while surgery and therapeutic hypothermia will be required to treat hemorrhagic stroke during the perinatal stage.

=== Medications ===
Anticoagulants are medications that interfere with the synthesis and function of several clotting factors present in the blood. These medications are commonly used to decrease the possibility of further blood clotting in the babies' brain who have a medical history of perinatal stroke. These drugs are taken upon expression of identifiable risk factors of perinatal stroke such as multiple cerebral emboli or severe thrombophilia. Examples of anticoagulants used are heparin and aspirin. Some common side effects of anticoagulants are low platelet counts, gastrointestinal bleeding or stomach ulcers.

Anticonvulsants are drugs that alter the level of neurotransmitters (GABA) at synapses between neurons. They also affect the concentration of ions in the neurons by altering the activity of (Na+, K+, Ca2+, Cl-) ion channels in the neuronal cell membrane. These modifications alter the electrical impulses conductivity by amplifying inhibition or reducing the excitation of the neurons. Anticonvulsants such as benzodiazepines, phenytoin, and carbamazepine are commonly used in controlling epilepsy due to perinatal stroke. Adverse effects of these medications include headaches, dizziness and vision problems.

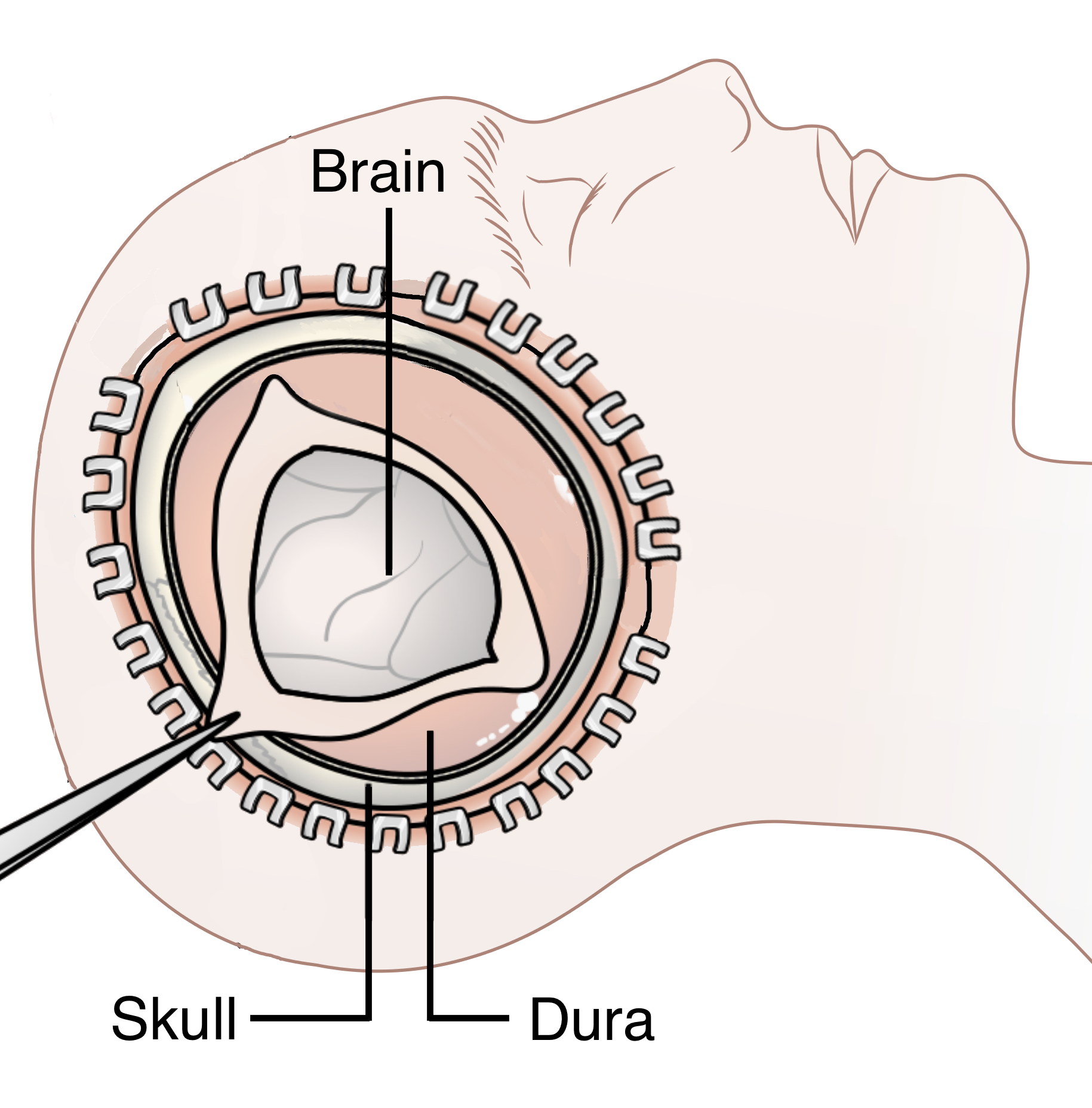
Illustration of decompressive craniectomy surgery

=== Surgery ===
Decompression craniectomy is a procedure commonly used to alleviate the pressure in the brain by removing the pooling blood caused by the ischemic stroke during the perinatal stage. The surgeons will first remove the skin and tissues on top of the site of injury, revealing the skull. Then, a small hole will be made on the skull to allow them to stop the bleeding, before sealing it later.

Temporal lobectomy is a procedure that removes parts of the anterior temporal lobe in treating seizures due to perinatal stroke. Patients who have undergone this surgery will be seizure-free and some will show significant improvement in controlling the seizure.

=== Therapeutic hypothermia ===
Therapeutic hypothermia is a process that reduces the metabolism and induces self-repairing of the brain by cooling it down. This method will also cause constriction of blood vessels in the brain, reducing the probability of reacting with hyperactive responses that aggravate brain damage. Such a procedure is proven effective in reducing the possibility of major neurological disability and mortality by 25% when carried out six hours after birth. This may be problematic for infants that do not express identifiable symptoms of perinatal stroke. A new direction in treating perinatal stroke by combining therapeutic hypothermia and growth factor medications will most likely improve the condition of the infants after suffering from a stroke.
