= European Journal of Pediatrics =

- Discipline: Pediatrics
- Language: English
- Edited by: Peter de Winter

Publication details
- Former name(s): Zeitschrift für Kinderheilkunde
- History: 1910-present
- Publisher: Springer Science+Business Media
- Frequency: Monthly
- Impact factor: 3.860 (2021)

Standard abbreviations
- ISO 4: Eur. J. Pediatr.

Indexing
- CODEN: EJPEDT
- ISSN: 0340-6199 (print); 1432-1076 (web)

Links
- Journal homepage; Online archive

The European Journal of Pediatrics is a monthly peer-reviewed medical journal covering pediatrics. It was established in 1910 as the Zeitschrift für Kinderheilkunde, obtaining its current name in 1975. It is published by Springer Science+Business Media and is the official journal of both the Belgian Pediatric Society and the Swiss Pediatric Society. The editor-in-chief is Peter de Winter (Spaarne Gasthuis). According to the Journal Citation Reports, the journal has a 2021 impact factor of 3.860.
