= Knox Presbyterian Church (Ottawa) =

Knox Presbyterian Church Ottawa, Ontario
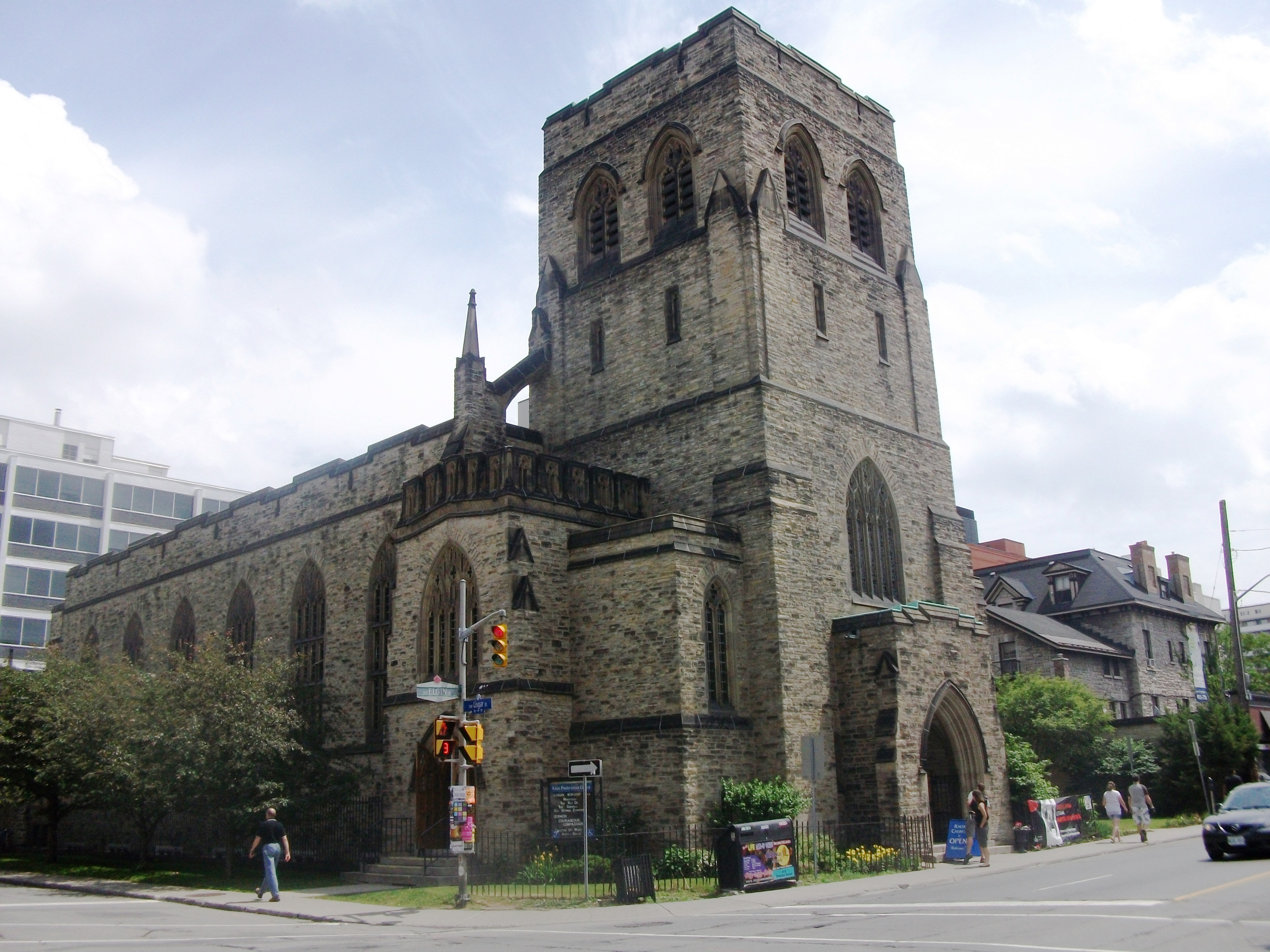
- Knox Presbyterian at Lisgar Street, Ottawa
- Knox Presbyterian Church Ottawa, Ontario
- 45.419126°N 75.691059°W
- Location: 120 Lisgar St., Ottawa, Ontario
- Country: Canada
- Denomination: Presbyterian
- Website: knoxottawa.ca

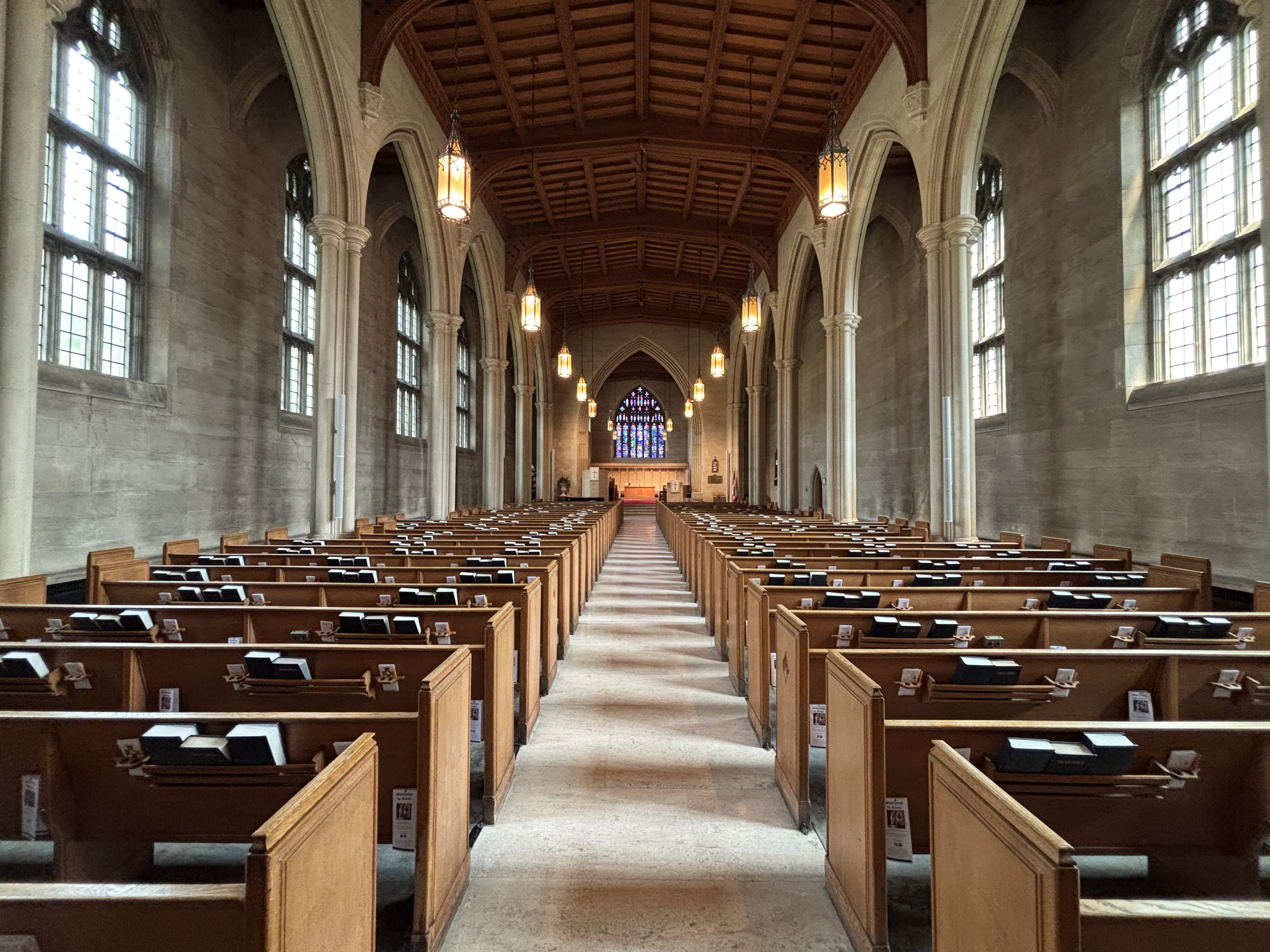
Interior of Knox Presbyterian Church

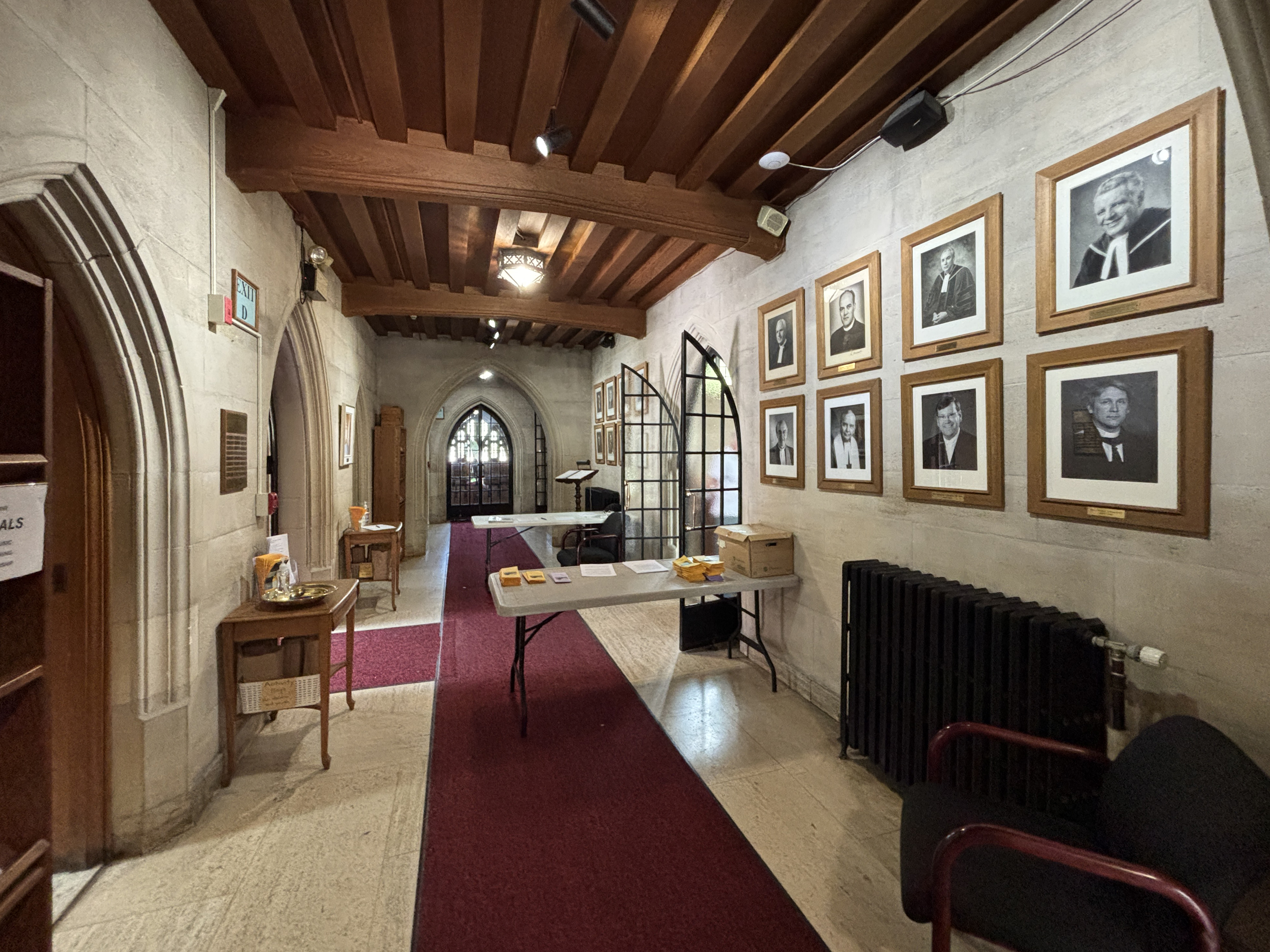
Foyer of the church

Knox Presbyterian Church is a Presbyterian Church in Ottawa, Ontario, Canada. It is named after John Knox, a founder of Presbyterianism in Scotland.

== History ==
Knox was founded as a result of the split within the congregation of St. Andrew's, Ottawa's first Presbyterian church, between those loyal to the Church of Scotland and those supporting the Free Church movement, as had occurred in Scotland the year before. The supporters of the Free Church in Ottawa and environs, set up Knox Free Church in 1844, just after the Church of Scotland's Canadian Synod in Kingston was split.

Designed by Donald Kennedy in 1845, the original Knox Church was located in Sandy Hill at the corner of Daly Avenue and Cumberland.

In 1866, a number of members formed a congregation on Bank Street, that is now Dominion-Chalmers United Church, just two blocks west at Cooper and Lisgar.

In 1874, the Knox congregation moved downtown, leaving their building to the first St. Paul's Presbyterian, that became St. Paul's-Eastern United Church (Eastern Methodist) after church union in 1925.

This second Knox Church was built on Elgin Street at Albert Street next door to the Second City Hall (Ottawa) on what is today the site of the National Arts Centre. It was designed by Henry Langley (architect) 1872-74. It opened prior to the formation of the Presbyterian Church in Canada in 1875; the General Assembly of the Canada Presbyterian Church was held at Knox in 1874 where the deliberations over the Union took place.

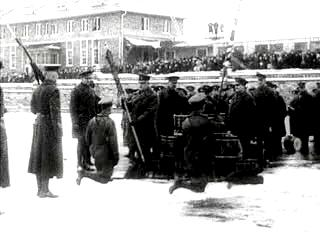
Sir Sam Hughes inspects 207th battalion and Presents Colours, 18 November 1916

The Regimental and King’s Colours of the 207th Battalion were "laid up" at Knox in 1919. They now rest in the sanctuary of the present church in a display case with a plaque dedicated to the memory of those who served in the 207th (Ottawa-Carleton) Battalion, CEF during the First World War. The Regimental Colours had been donated by the American Bank Note Company and presented by Major General Hon. Sir Sam Hughes, K.C.B., M.P. to the Battalion on Parliament Hill on November 18, 1916.

In 1930, the City of Ottawa expropriated this area to widen Elgin Street and Knox Church, which had remained within the Presbyterian Church in Canada in 1925, was forced to move a few blocks to its present location at the corner of Lisgar and Elgin.

The second church was demolished in 1932. The Drawings Collection at the Ontario Archives contains the set of plans by Langley for this ecclesiastical commission 889-98.

The present Knox Church building, designed in 1931 by John Albert Ewart and Henry Sproatt opened in 1932. The church has hosted the General Assembly of the Presbyterian Church in Canada three times: first in 1937, then in 1981, but only for the opening Worship, as the nearby University of Ottawa was the scene of the proceedings. In 2008, Knox again hosted the opening Worship at General Assembly, while the remainder of the activities took place at Carleton University.

== Ministers ==
The following is a list of ministers at Knox:

- Thomas Wardrope, 1845 - 1869, Moderator of the Presbyterian Church in Canada in 1891.
- William MacLaren, 1870 - 1873 left to be Professor and Principal (1905 - 1909 of Knox College. Moderator Presbyterian Church in Canada 1884,
- Francis W. Farries, 1875 - 1893.
- James Ballantyne, 1894 - 1896, left to become a Professor at Knox College, Moderator Presbyterian Church in Canada in 1920,
- David M. Ramsay 1897 - 1913.
- Robert B. Whyte 1916 - 1923.
- E. Lloyd Morrow 1923 - 1926 left to become a Professor at Knox College
- Robert Johnston 1927 - 1947, Moderator Presbyterian Church in Canada, 1932 while minister of Knox Church.
- Colin Miller 1948 - 1955.
- H. Douglas Stewart, 1956 - 1972, left to become minister at St. Andrew's Church (Toronto).
- Malcolm McCuaig 1972 - 1985,
- Donald F. Collier 1986 - 1992,
- Stephen A. Hayes 1993 - 2004, called to minister at St. Andrew's Church (Quebec City)
- Douglas Kendall 2005 - 2009, called to minister at St. Andrew’s Church (Stittsville)
- David J. Thom 2011 - 2013 returned to Scotland, from where he had been called
- James E. Pot 2015 - Present

The current minister is the Rev. James Pot. Raised in Southern Ontario and educated at Redeemer University College (Ancaster, Ontario) and Calvin Theological Seminary (Grand Rapids, Michigan) he was ordained in 1992 in the Christian Reformed Church. After ministering in that denomination with two Alberta congregations and one in Ontario, he was accepted as a minister in the Presbyterian Church in Canada in 2013 and served as pulpit supply for both denominations in the Hamilton area before being called to Knox in 2015.

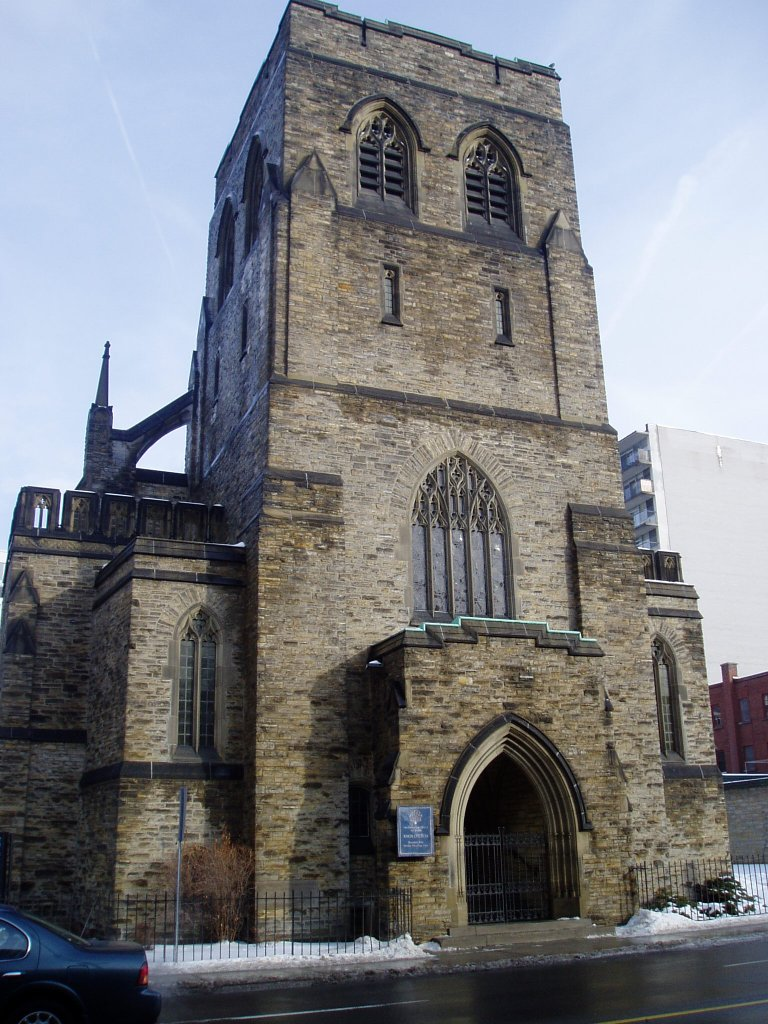
Knox Presbyterian church, 120 Lisgar St., Ottawa, ON

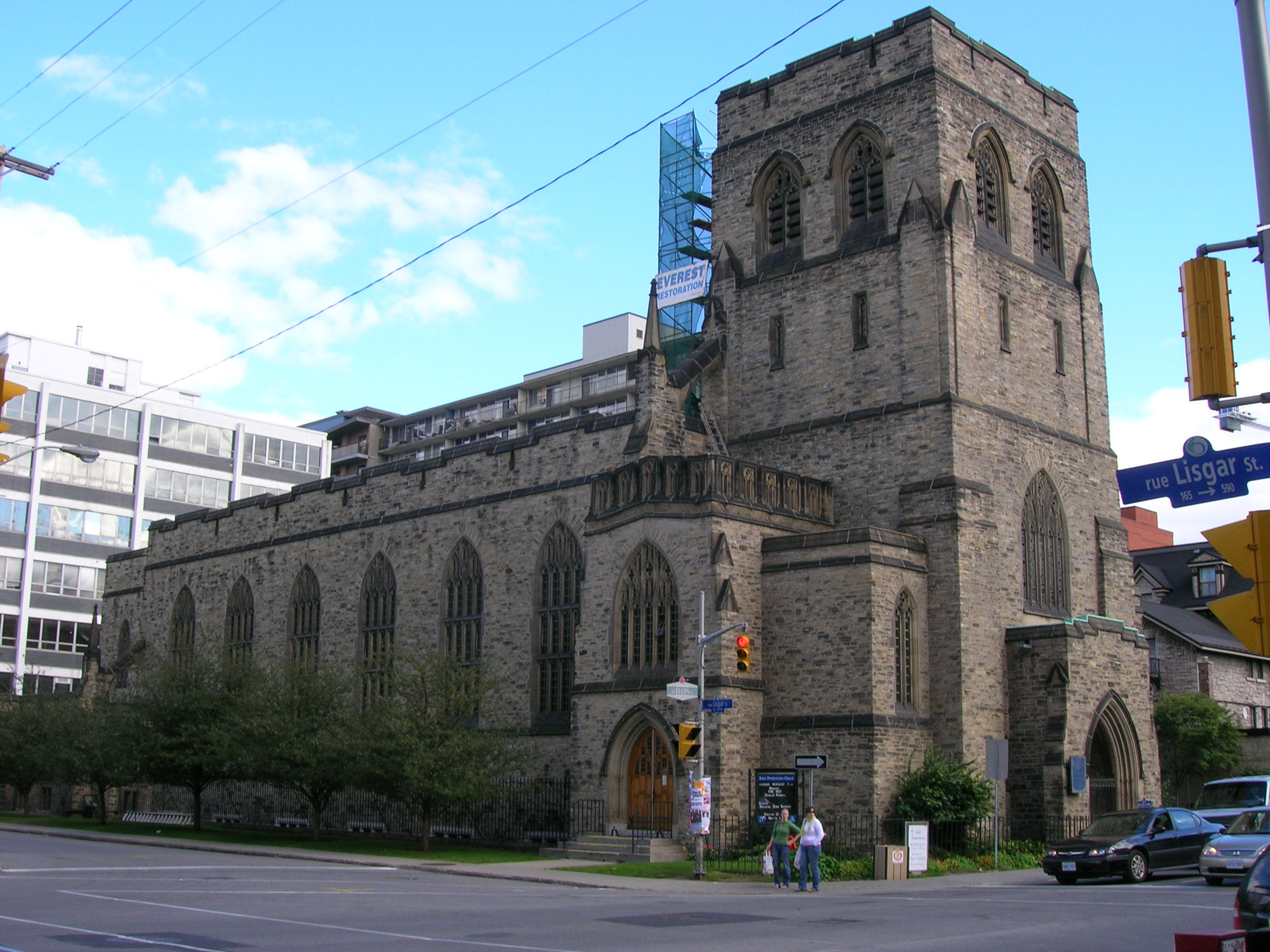
Knox Presbyterian church, 120 Lisgar St., Ottawa, ON
