= St. Andrew's Presbyterian Church (Ottawa) =

Presbyterian church in Ottawa, Ontario, Canada

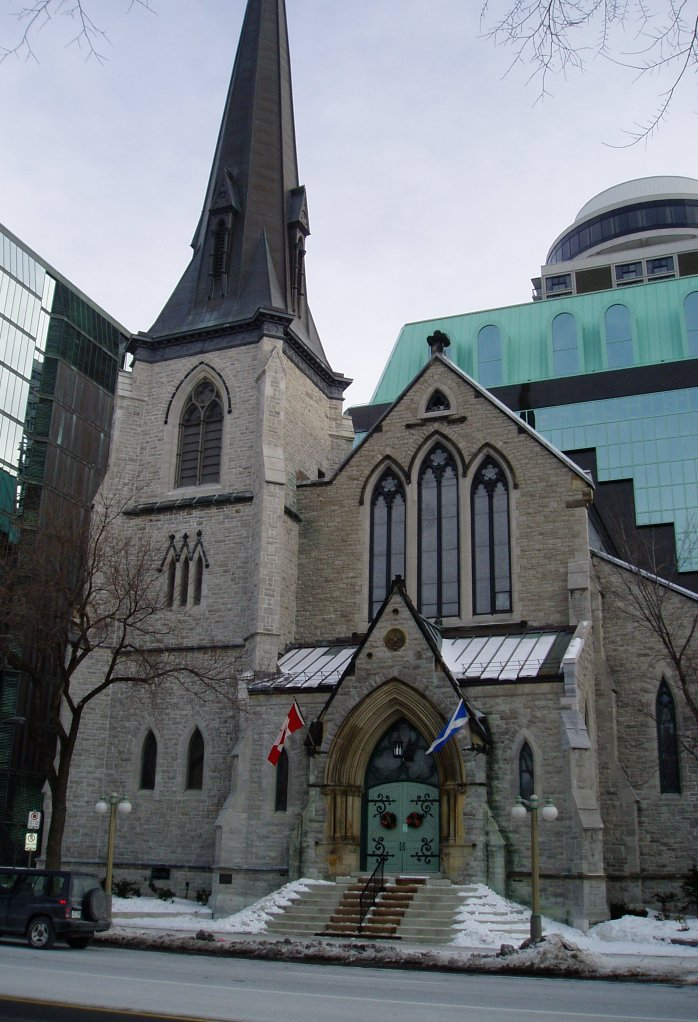
- St. Andrew's Presbyterian Church in Downtown Ottawa
- St. Andrew's Presbyterian Church
- 45.420327°N 75.703635°W
- Address: 82 Kent Street, Ottawa, Ontario
- Country: Canada
- Denomination: Presbyterian
- Website: standrewsottawa.ca

St. Andrew's Presbyterian Church is the oldest Presbyterian church in Ottawa, Ontario, Canada.

== History ==
=== Creation ===
St. Andrews is Ottawa's oldest Protestant Presbyterian Church in Canada congregation. Nicholas Sparks donated land in 1827, which permitted the construction and opening in 1828 of the St. Andrew's Presbyterian Church.

The church was founded for, and built by, the Scottish and Irish labourers who were constructing the Rideau Canal for Montreal's John Redpath and their own Thomas McKay. The location on Wellington Street was purchased for 200 pounds sterling and the church was built during lulls in the construction of the canal.

As Ottawa had no Anglican church at the time, St. Andrew's argued that it should be considered the established church in the city, as the representative of the Established Church of Scotland. The advantage of being so recognized, was the rights to clergy reserves. The authorities agreed to the request, and in 1837 the church was granted a large glebe to the south of the city. This area stretching from Bronson Avenue to the Rideau Canal later became the neighbourhood known as the Glebe.

In the 1840s a stone manse was built where the Sunday School Hall later stood. The minister of St. Andrews was the Rev. Alexander McKidd, M.A., from 1844 to July 1846.

In 1844, a number of families left following the 1843 Disruption within the Church of Scotland, and formed Knox Free Church.

Rev. William Durie, was inducted in the spring of 1846, cared for the typhus-stricken immigrants passing through Bytown and died of typhus in September 1847. The Rev. Alexander Spence, D.D., served a long ministry of nearly twenty years from July 1848 to 1867.

An extension for the original building was completed in 1854. The Rev. J. H. McLardy was Assistant Minister during 1865. During 1866-1867, the Rev. Daniel Miner Gordon was Assistant Minister; he returned as Minister 1869-1883, and later served as Principal of Queen's University, Kingston, Ont.

The building was replaced with the current structure in 1872. The commission for St. Andrew's Presbyterian Church on Wellington Street at Kent Street was awarded to William Tutin Thomas of Montreal in 1872-74.

=== Growth ===
In June 1875, St. Andrew's, Knox, Bank Street (later Chalmers), the newly formed congregations in New Edinburgh (now MacKay United Church, named after their first Elder and Trustee Thomas MacKay), and in the Sandy Hill (or Lower Town) St. Paul's or Daly Street, and congregations in nearby Rochesterville (Erskine), Hull, Quebec, Cumberland, Manotick, Nepean (Merivale, and Bells Corners), that all became part of the Presbyterian Church in Canada, within the Presbytery of Ottawa.

On the 7 August 1883, the Rev. W. T. Herridge, D.D., was inducted.

The Dominion of Canada Rifle Association erected a plaque in 1906 which is dedicated to Lt Colonel John MacPherson (1830-1906), who served as its treasurer for 36 years.

=== Great War ===
In 1913, the Rev. A. M. Gordon was Assistant Minister; in 1914 he went overseas with the first Canadian Contingent and served with distinction throughout the First World War.

The Ottawa Branch of the 21st Battalion Association erected a memorial plaque which is dedicated to Brigadier General William St Pierre Hughes, D.S.O., V.D., First Commanding Officer 21st Battalion (Eastern Ontario), CEF 1914–1916.

In 1919, Dr. R.T. Herridge retired and he was appointed Minister Emeritus.

Erected by his wife and children, a memorial plaque at St. Andrew's Presbyterian Church (Ottawa) is dedicated to Major General James Lyons Biggar, C.M.G., Quartermaster General of Canada in 1917 during the Great War.

A memorial stained glass window is dedicated to members of the church who gave their lives in the Great War: "They overcame and they loved not their lives unto the death 1914–1918" Members of the Overseas C.A.M.C. Nursing Service erected a memorial plaque which is dedicated to Matron Margaret H. Smith, R.R.C. & Bar, veteran of the South African War and the Great War.

The Rev. George Kilpatrick, B.D., who served overseas during the Great War with distinction, was Minister from 1920 until June 1925. In 1925, this congregation voted 389-309 to remain in the Presbyterian Church in Canada rather than join the United Church of Canada. A number of families, and the Minister, went to nearby Chalmers; only Knox and Erskine (closed October 2007, and amalgamated with Westminster), within the then City of Ottawa remained as "continuing" Presbyterians.

=== Between the wars ===
After 1925, the Presbyterian presence in Ottawa was far smaller. St Andrew's, Knox and Erskine were involved with citywide ministries. A church school in the Hintonburg neighbourhood (the former Bethany Presbyterian Church became Parkdale United) became St. Stephen's Church in 1945, while "minority" groups formed St. Giles in The Glebe, Westminster in Westboro, South Gloucester and Knox Church, Manotick.

=== Second World War ===
Princess Juliana of the Netherlands erected a wooden lectern and brass plaque, which is dedicated in thanks to the church for their hospitality during Princess Juliana's residence in Ottawa during the Second World War.

A memorial plaque is dedicated to members of the church who died or served during the Second World War: "To you from falling hands we throw the torch; be yours to hold it high" John McCrae.

=== Rebuilding ===
Following the 1950 annexation by Ottawa of parts of Nepean and Gloucester Townships, St. Andrew's was very supportive of Presbyterian church extension into these new residential neighbourhoods. Under the leadership of Rev. Dr. John A. Johnston, (1927–2008) late father of Andrew Johnston (Senior Minister, 1999–2013), four new congregations were started after his appointment in 1956; St. Timothy's on Alta Vista Drive, a new St. Paul's, located on Woodroffe Avenue, St. Martin's in Manor Park, and St. David's in Overbrook. The latter two merged in 1967, and later extension projects included Parkwood, in Nepean, Trinity in Kanata, Grace in Orleans, and Greenview (closed June 30, 2007) in Barrhaven.

=== Since the 1970s ===
With the changing demographics in Ottawa, there were other changes in the area adjacent to the congregation. In the 1970s, it was decided to lease the land to the rear of the church. The Sunday school building that had been built in 1874 was torn down (there was a fire) and an office building, St. Andrew's Tower, was built in its place in 1988. This building, which is attached directly to the rear of the church, is now the headquarters of the Department of Justice, although the congregation has offices, and rooms on the lower levels, entered from Kent Street, with wheelchair access from the Tower Building.

A number of dignitaries have attended the church. It was where Prime Minister William Lyon Mackenzie King worshipped when in Ottawa. Governors General included the Earl of Aberdeen, and Lord Tweedsmuir, also known as author John Buchan, whose February 1940 funeral was held within the sanctuary. Princess Margriet of the Netherlands was baptized here, while the royal family was in exile during the Second World War, and a lectern was later donated by the family, featuring the Dutch Royal Coat of Arms.

In September 2003, the congregation celebrated its 175th anniversary. A new history, Unto the Hills Around by John S. Moir, was published for this occasion. This book was awarded the T. Melville Bailey Memorial Award by the Presbyterian Church in Canada's Committee on History in June 2005.

== Ministers ==
The Senior Minister of St. Andrew's is the Reverend Dr. Karen Dimock. Born in Scotland, Reverend Dimock moved to Jamaica at an early age before arriving in the Hamilton, Ontario area at age four. She studied sciences and received a PhD in Neuroscience from McGill University before entering the ministry. Reverend Dimock has been the Minister at St Andrew's since November 2014.

Since 1828, fourteen ministers have served this congregation along with a number of associates, assistants, deaconesses, pastoral care, and student ministers. All but six of these senior ministers were born in Scotland.

Two ministers, Rev. Dr. William T. Herridge (1914), and Minister Emeritus Rev. Dr. Arthur W. Currie (1981), held the Office of Moderator of the General Assembly of the Presbyterian Church in Canada while serving as Minister of St. Andrew's. Rev. Dr. Daniel Miner Gordon (1896) was moderator after his tenure (1867–1882) in Ottawa, and before he became Principal of Queen's University. The General Assembly moderated by Dr. Currie was also held in Ottawa, in Knox, and at Tabaret Hall in the University of Ottawa.

St. Andrew's has hosted the Presbyterian General Assembly in 1879 1901, 1910, 1929, 1951, and 1997, and before 1875, the Church of Scotland Synod in 1859 and 1874.

=== List of ministers ===
- John Cruickshank (1829–1843)
- Alexander MacKid (1844–1846)
- William Durie + (1846–1847)
- Alexander Spence (1848–1867)
- Daniel Miner Gordon (1867–1882)
- William T. Herridge (1883–1919)
- George G.D. Kirkpatrick B.D. (1920–1925)
- William Harvey Leathem + (1926–1937)
- Alexander Ferguson + (1938–1942)
- Andrew Ian Burnett (1943–1960)
- Arthur W. Currie (1961–1986)
- James Peter Jones (1987–1997)
- Andrew J. R. Johnston (1999–2013)
- Karen Dimock (2014–)

Assistants;

- Daniel Miner Gordon (1866–1867)

Associates;

- Arthur M. Pattison (1973–1977)
- Willard Pottinger (1978–1985)
- Brian Weatherdon (1989–1994)
- Gregory Davidson (2005–2009)

+ Died in pastorate.

== See also ==
- List of designated heritage properties in Ottawa
