= State funerals in Canada =

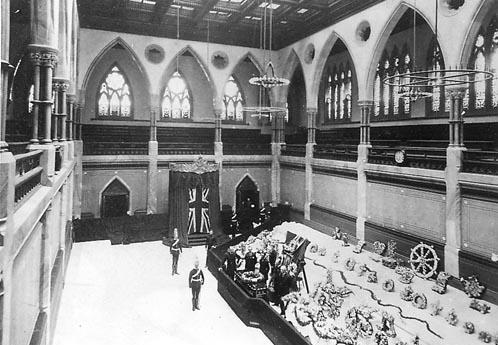
The remains of John A. Macdonald lying in state in the Senate Chamber, 1891

State funerals in Canada are public events held to commemorate former governors general, prime ministers, other members of the cabinet who died in office, and, at the cabinet's discretion, other eminent Canadians. With ceremonial, military, and religious elements incorporated, state funerals are offered and executed by the governor general-in-council, who provides a dignified manner for the Canadian people to mourn a national public figure. Provincial and territorial governments may also perform state funerals for citizens in their particular jurisdictions. However, most state funerals are federal affairs.

As Canada shares the person of its monarch with the other Commonwealth realms, funerals for Canada's sovereigns, as well as for their consorts, typically take place in the monarch's oldest and most populous realm, the United Kingdom. In Canada, a commemoration service is conducted by the federal crown-in-council and sometimes by provincial crowns, as well.

== Process ==
State funerals are not required by any law and the family of the deceased may opt not to have such an event take place. Should the family agree to a state funeral, the Department of Canadian Heritage will work in close consultation with them, as well as with other government departments and elements of the private sector, the degree of involvement depending on the size and complexity of the event. Similarly, the timeline varies on a case-by-case basis, most lasting between five and six days, during which the national flag is flown at half-mast on the Peace Tower on Parliament Hill in Ottawa and at other federal crown-owned installations across the country.

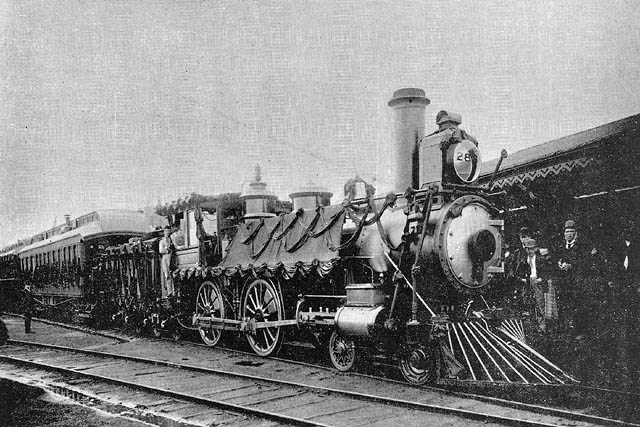
The funeral train of John A. Macdonald, pulled by Canadian Pacific no.283, carrying his remains on 10 June 1891 from Ottawa to Kingston, Ontario

A formal statement issued by the governor general-in-council is typically broadcast by the media to notify the general public of an upcoming state funeral, while the Department of Canadian Heritage issues invitations according to the order of precedence, with foreign heads of state and government included.

Meanwhile, in the days leading up to the funeral, the body is transported from the place of death to Ottawa, whereupon the casket is met by a guard of honour—drawn from the Governor General's Foot Guards for a former governor general and from the Royal Canadian Mounted Police for a former prime minister, other ministers, or honoured individuals—and escorted by it to the Centre Block of the parliament buildings. There, the remains lie in state for a period of two days, with four members of the accordant guard of honour maintaining a constant vigil; for the remains of governors general, this takes place in the Senate chamber, in the Hall of Honour for those of prime ministers, and in other rooms for other individuals. On both days, designated hours are set for public viewing. The coffin is then escorted from the Centre Block to a waiting hearse as a gun salute is fired; 21 guns for a governor general, 19 guns for a prime minister, and 15 guns for others. The casket is then either transported to another location in the country for further memorials or to the place of burial.

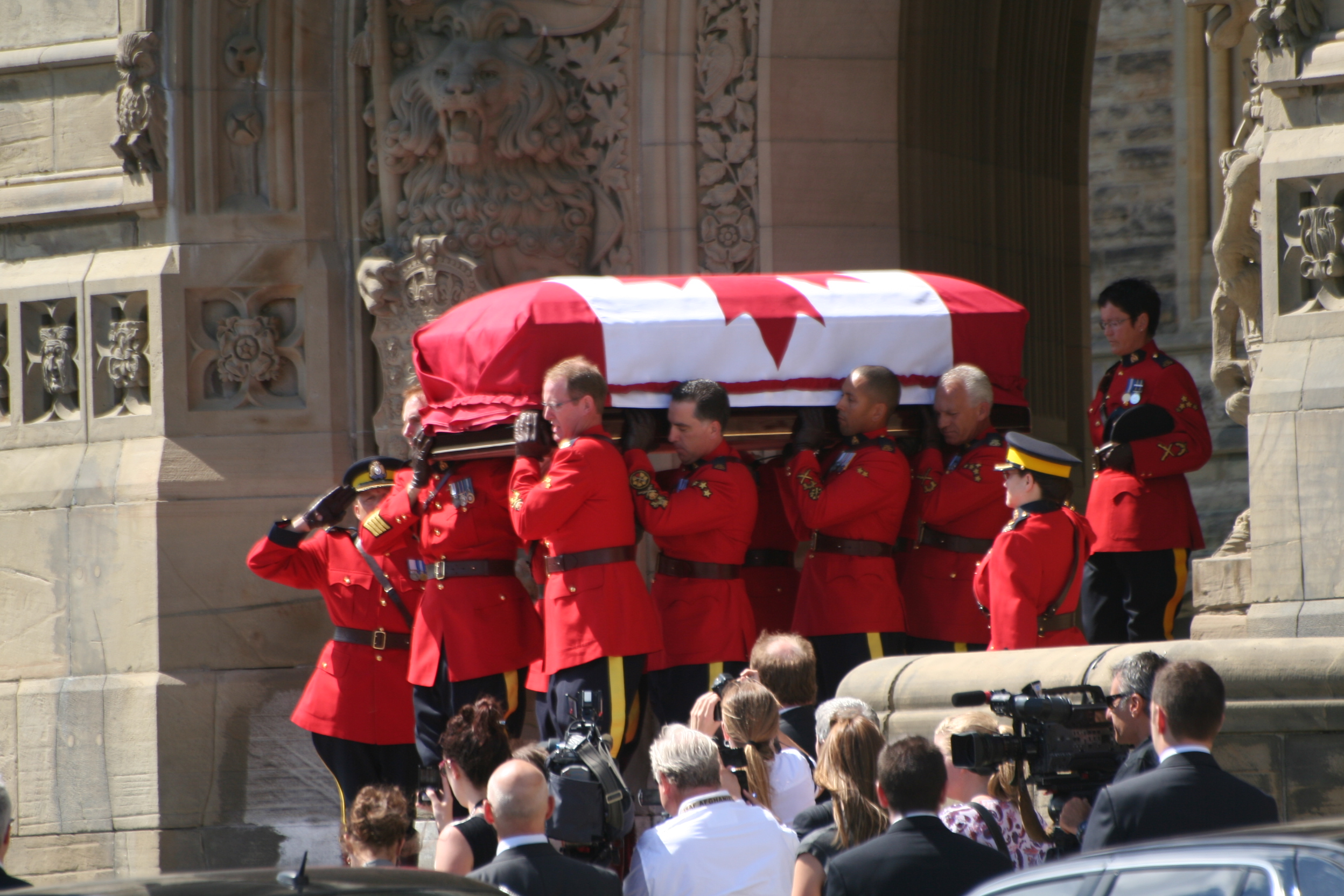
Jack Layton's casket being moved from the Centre Block of the parliament buildings after lying in state

State funeral memorial services are typically held in churches. The choice of host church is dependent on the religious faith of the deceased. However, since 1968, all state funerals held in Ottawa have included a service at the Anglican Church of Canada's Christ Church Cathedral; its five state funerals are the most of any venue. Three other churches have hosted two state funerals: All Saints Anglican Church, Notre-Dame Cathedral Basilica, and St Andrew's Presbyterian Church, all in Ottawa. The state funeral of Jack Layton, held in 2011 at Roy Thomson Hall in Toronto, is the only Canadian state funeral to have been held outside of a church.

Similar to a state funeral is a commemoration ceremony, which is a religious and/or memorial service to mark the passing of Canada's monarch (see Monarchy of Canada#Commemorative ceremonies) or a royal consort (both of whom typically have their state funerals in the United Kingdom), an individual from a family that did not wish a state funeral, or a foreign dignitary. For instance, a commemoration ceremony was held in Ottawa in 2002 for the death of Queen Elizabeth, the Queen Mother, the consort of King George VI. A service was held in 2013 for Nelson Mandela, the former President of South Africa. Nevertheless, these commemorations may be classified as state funerals by the Canadian government. Provinces will also conduct their own commemoration ceremonies for the passing of the country's sovereign or a royal consort.

Not all who lie in state at parliament, nor all for whom flags are flown at half-mast, receive a state funeral. The exception was made for the funeral of Retired Sergeant Ernest Smith, the last living Canadian recipient of the Victoria Cross from the Second World War.

In planning a state funeral, the government makes "every effort to accommodate the wishes of the family" and the family may decline the honour. A state funeral was offered for assassinated Quebec cabinet minister Pierre Laporte in 1970 but his widow declined. A state funeral was also offered for Chief Justice Bora Laskin by Prime Minister Pierre Trudeau but his family declined, saying that Laskin "liked things very simple". Instead, Laskin was honoured with a lying in state on Parliament Hill.

== History ==
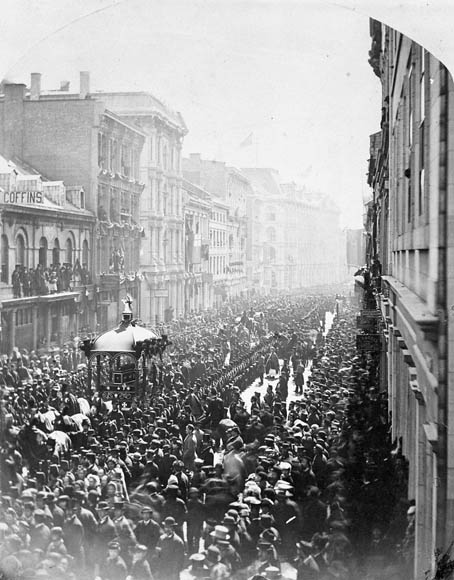
The funeral procession of Thomas D'Arcy McGee in Montreal, 1868

The first state funeral in Canada was held for Thomas D'Arcy McGee after his assassination in April 1868. The first Governor General of Canada to receive a state funeral was the Lord Tweedsmuir in 1940, who died in office. Sir John A. Macdonald, Canada's first prime minister was also the first to receive a state funeral. Jack Layton was the first Leader of Her Majesty's Loyal Opposition who was not also a former prime minister to be honoured with a state funeral; after lying in state in the foyer of the House of Commons, the funeral service took place at Roy Thomson Hall in Toronto.

Every prime minister of Canada has been accorded a state funeral except for two. Following the death of Canada's second prime minister, Alexander Mackenzie, flags were flown at half-mast across the country and parliament adjourned following speeches commemorating the former prime minister but while a state funeral was suggested, it was not ordered. Mackenzie's funeral occurred at the Jarvis Street Baptist Church with representatives of the federal cabinet in attendance as well as Opposition leader Wilfrid Laurier and almost all members of the Ontario legislature.

Former Prime Minister R. B. Bennett did not have a state funeral as he had moved to England after leaving Canadian politics. He was buried in England in St. Michael's Churchyard, Mickleham in "a simple private service".

=== Ceremonies for monarchs ===
To mark the death of Queen Victoria in 1901, the federal crown-in-council arranged for gun salutes to take place on Parliament Hill, in the national capital, as well as at armouries across the country. The day of her funeral in the United Kingdom, 2 February, was declared a national day of mourning. When King Edward VII died in 1910, his funeral date, 20 May, was set as a national holiday, during which military parades and tributes were held across the country.

The death of King George V was officially recognized on the day of his funeral in the UK, 28 January 1936, by a royal proclamation from Governor General the Lord Tweedsmuir, urging Canadians to attend church services and drape public buildings in black crepe. Between the King's death and his funeral, courthouses were closed. As George's successor, Edward VIII, abdicated his position as king of Canada by the end of 1936, no ceremonies marked his death in 1972. At the time, Queen Elizabeth II, received messages of condolence from Governor General, Roland Michener, and Prime Minister, Pierre Trudeau, and the federal parliament passed a motion expressing sympathy. None made mention of the Duke's previous role as Canada's king, only his time as Prince of Wales. Prime Minister Louis St Laurent laid a wreath at the Centre Block, in Ottawa, on 15 February 1952, the day of the burial of George VI. The day was an official holiday only in some provinces, while, in others, it was left to municipalities to decide how to commemorate the King.

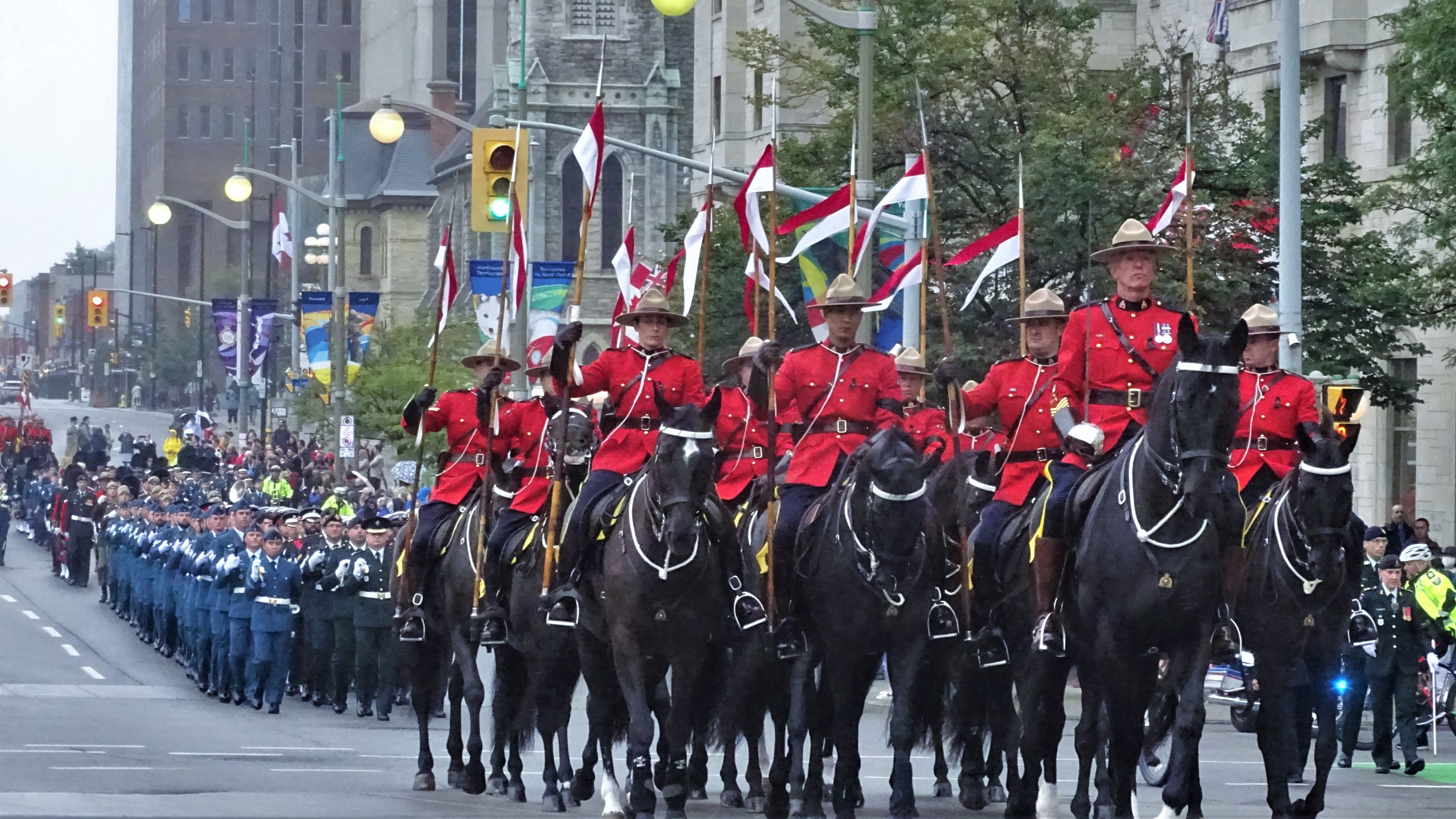
The military parade held in Ottawa before the national commemoration ceremony for the death of Queen Elizabeth II

When Queen Elizabeth II died on 8 September 2022, after a 70-year reign as Queen of Canada, the country immediately entered a period of official mourning. A federal holiday was declared for the funeral, while the provinces made a variety of arrangements for holidays.

A national commemoration ceremony for Elizabeth II took place at Christ Church Cathedral in Ottawa on 19 September, preceded by a parade of the Canadian Armed Forces and Royal Canadian Mounted Police through downtown Ottawa, as well as a 96-gun salute. Commemoration services took place in several provinces on the same day: in Alberta, British Columbia, Manitoba, New Brunswick, Newfoundland and Labrador, Nova Scotia, Prince Edward Island, and Saskatchewan. In Ontario, a memorial service was held in Toronto on 20 September. On the advice of his cabinet, the Lieutenant Governor of Quebec did not authorize any official service of remembrance.

== List of state funerals in Canada ==
Canadian state funerals
State position	Name	Date of funeral	Place of funeral	Venue	Sources
Minister	Thomas D'Arcy McGee (Note: McGee, Foster, Perley, and Flaherty were not sitting cabinet ministers at the times of their deaths.)	1868	Ottawa, Ontario	St Patrick's Basilica	
Prime Minister	John A. Macdonald	1891	Ottawa, Ontario	St Alban's Anglican Church	
Prime Minister	John Abbott	1893	Montreal, Quebec	Christ Church Cathedral	
Prime Minister	John Sparrow David Thompson	1895	Halifax, Nova Scotia	St Mary's Basilica	
Prime Minister	Charles Tupper	1915	Halifax, Nova Scotia	St Paul's Anglican Church	
Prime Minister	Mackenzie Bowell	1917	Belleville, Ontario	Bridge Street Methodist Church	
Prime Minister	Wilfrid Laurier	1919	Ottawa, Ontario	Notre-Dame Cathedral Basilica	
Minister	James Robb	1929	Salaberry-de-Valleyfield, Quebec	Valleyfield United Church	
Minister	George Eulas Foster	1932	Ottawa, Ontario	Chalmers United Church	
Prime Minister	Robert Borden	1937	Ottawa, Ontario	All Saints Anglican Church	
Minister	George Halsey Perley	1938	Ottawa, Ontario	All Saints Anglican Church	
Governor General	The Lord Tweedsmuir	1940	Ottawa, Ontario	St Andrew's Presbyterian Church	
Minister	Ernest Lapointe	1941	Quebec City, Quebec	Saint-Roch Church	
Minister	Raoul Dandurand	1942	Montreal, Quebec	Église Saint-Viateur d'Outremont	
Prime Minister	William Lyon Mackenzie King	1950	Ottawa, Ontario	St Andrew's Presbyterian Church	
Minister	Humphrey Mitchell	1950	Ottawa, Ontario	St Barnabas, Apostle and Martyr, Anglican Church	
Minister	Alcide Côté	1955	Saint-Jean-sur-Richelieu, Quebec	Cathedral of Saint-Jean-l'Évangéliste	
Minister	Sidney Earle Smith	1959	Ottawa, Ontario	Chalmers United Church	
Prime Minister	Arthur Meighen	1960	Toronto, Ontario	St. Andrew's United Church	
Minister	Jack Garland	1964	North Bay, Ontario	St. Andrew's United Church	
Governor General	Georges Vanier	1967	Ottawa, Ontario	Notre-Dame Cathedral Basilica	
Governor General	Vincent Massey	1968	Ottawa, Ontario	Christ Church Cathedral	
Prime Minister	Lester B. Pearson	1972	Ottawa, Ontario	Christ Church Cathedral	
Prime Minister	Louis St Laurent	1973	Quebec City, Quebec	Notre-Dame de Québec Cathedral	
Prime Minister	John Diefenbaker	1979	Ottawa, Ontario	Christ Church Cathedral	
Governor General	Jules Léger	1980	Salaberry-de-Valleyfield, Quebec	Basilique-Cathédrale Sainte-Cécile	
Minister	Daniel J. MacDonald	1980	Charlottetown, Prince Edward Island	St Dunstan's Basilica	
Governor General	Roland Michener	1991	Ottawa, Ontario	Christ Church Cathedral	
Governor General	Jeanne Sauvé	1993	Montreal, Quebec	Mary, Queen of the World Cathedral	
Prime Minister	Pierre Trudeau	2000	Montreal, Quebec	Notre-Dame Basilica	
Governor General	Ray Hnatyshyn	2002	Ottawa, Ontario	Christ Church Cathedral	
Governor General	Roméo LeBlanc	2009	Memramcook, New Brunswick	Saint-Thomas de Memramcook Church	
Leader of the Opposition	Jack Layton	2011	Toronto, Ontario	Roy Thomson Hall	
Minister	Jim Flaherty	2014	Toronto, Ontario	St James Cathedral	
Prime Minister	John Turner	2020	Toronto, Ontario	St Michael's Cathedral	
Privy Councillor	Ed Broadbent (Note: Longtime New Democratic Party leader Ed Broadbent was the first political leader who was neither a prime minister, cabinet minister, or leader of the opposition to be honoured with a state funeral.)	2024	Ottawa, Ontario	Dominion-Chalmers United Church	
Prime Minister	Brian Mulroney	2024	Montreal, Quebec	Notre-Dame Basilica	

== Other funerals for prime ministers ==
Non-state funerals for prime ministers
State position	Name	Date of funeral	Place of funeral	Venue	Sources
Prime Minister	Alexander Mackenzie	1892	Toronto, Ontario	Jarvis Street Baptist Church	
Prime Minister	R. B. Bennett	1947	Mickleham, Surrey, England	St. Michael's Church	

== List of national commemoration ceremonies in Canada ==
National commemoration ceremonies
State position	Name	Date of ceremony	Place of ceremony	Building	Sources
Queen consort	Queen Elizabeth, the Queen Mother	9 April 2002	Ottawa, Ontario	Christ Church Cathedral	
President of South Africa	Nelson Mandela	2013	Ottawa, Ontario	Parkdale United Church	
Royal consort	Prince Philip, Duke of Edinburgh	17 April 2021	Ottawa, Ontario	Christ Church Cathedral	
Queen of Canada	Elizabeth II	19 September 2022	Ottawa, Ontario	Christ Church Cathedral	
Senator	Murray Sinclair	10 November 2024	Winnipeg, Manitoba	Canada Life Centre	

== List of provincial state funerals in Canada ==
=== Alberta ===
State position	Name	Date of funeral	Place of funeral	Building	Sources
Lieutenant governor	Grant MacEwan	2000	Edmonton	Robertson-Wesley United Church	
Premier	Peter Lougheed	2012	Edmonton	Alberta Legislature	
Premier	Jim Prentice	2016	Calgary	Southern Alberta Jubilee Auditorium	

=== British Columbia ===
State position	Name	Date of funeral	Place of funeral	Building	Sources
Premier	John Horgan (Note: State memorial service)	15 December 2024	Colwood	The Q Centre	

=== Newfoundland and Labrador ===
State position	Name	Date of funeral	Place of funeral	Building	Sources
Prime Minister (Note: In 1936, the Dominion of Newfoundland was governed by a commission, Alderdice was Newfoundland's last Prime Minister before the suspension of self governance in 1934.)	Frederick C. Alderdice	28 February 1936 (Note: In 1936, Newfoundland was a separate Dominion of the British Empire.)	St. John's	St. Thomas' Church	
Lieutenant governor	John Crosbie	16 January 2020	St John's	Cathedral of St John the Baptist	

=== Ontario ===
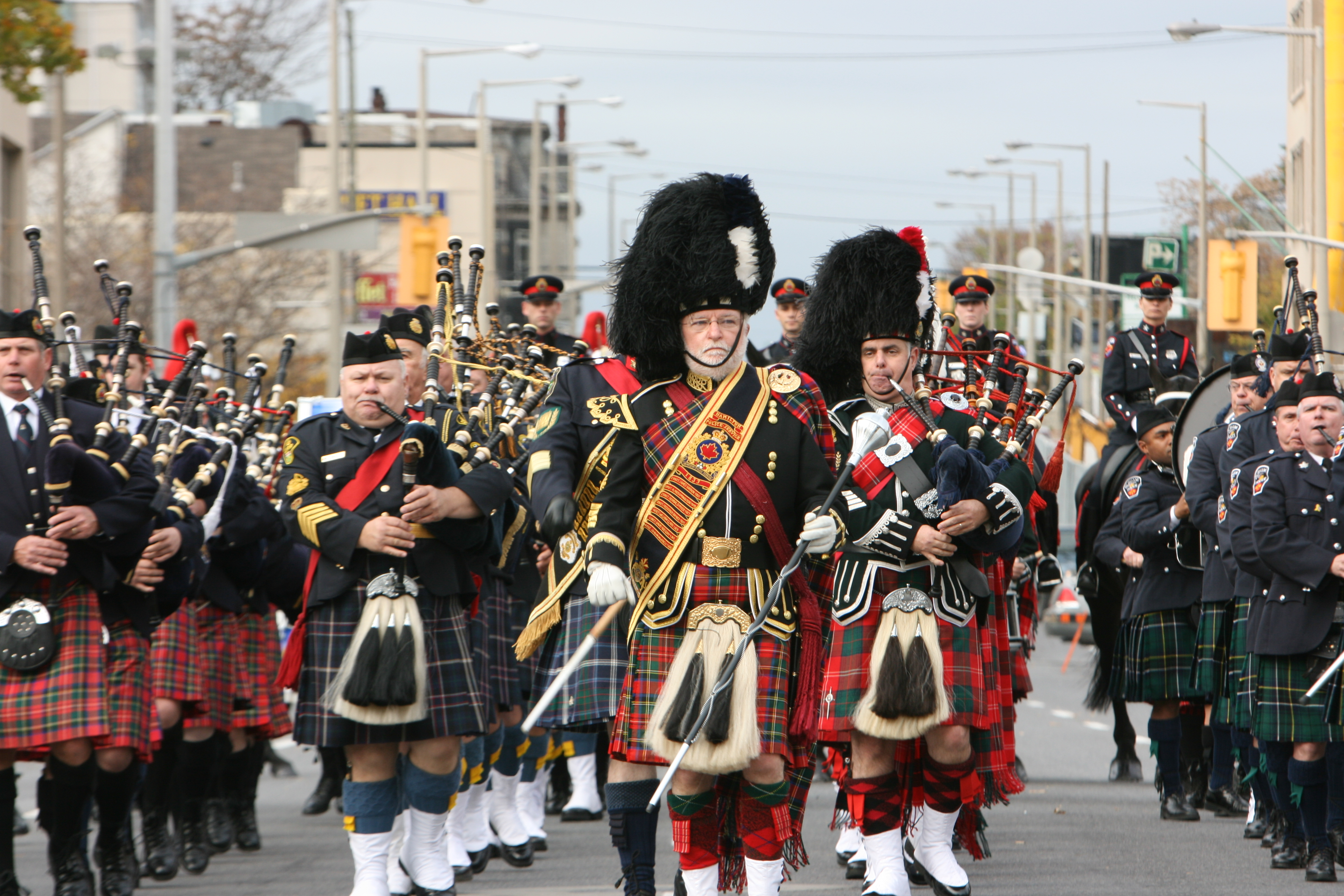
The funeral procession for former Lieutenant Governor of Ontario Lincoln Alexander, in Toronto, 2012

State position	Name	Date of funeral	Place of funeral	Building	Sources
Premier	John Robarts	1982	Toronto	St. Paul's Anglican Church	
Lieutenant governor	Lincoln Alexander	26 October 2012	Hamilton	Hamilton Place Theatre	
Lieutenant governor	David Onley	30 January 2023	Toronto	Yorkminster Park Baptist Church	
Mayor	Hazel McCallion	14 February 2023	Mississauga	Paramount Fine Foods Centre	

=== Quebec ===
State funerals in Quebec are reserved for former premiers. "National" funerals may be held for other distinguished Quebecers. Unlike state funerals, these are only partially subsidized by the government.

State position	Name	Date of funeral	Place of funeral	Building	Sources
Premier	Maurice Duplessis	1959	Trois-Rivières	De l'Assomption (Immaculée-Conception) Cathedral	
Premier	Daniel Johnson Sr	1968	Quebec City	Cathedral-Basilica of Notre-Dame de Québec	
Premier	Jean Lesage	1980	Quebec City	Cathedral-Basilica of Notre-Dame de Québec	
Premier	René Lévesque	1987	Quebec City	Cathedral-Basilica of Notre-Dame de Québec	
Premier	Robert Bourassa	1996	Montreal	Basilique Notre-Dame de Montréal	
Premier	Jacques Parizeau	2015	Montreal	Église Saint-Germain	
Premier	Bernard Landry	2018	Montreal	Basilique Notre-Dame de Montréal	

==== National funerals ====
Occupation	Name	Date of funeral	Place of funeral	Building	Sources
Athlete	Maurice Richard	2000	Montreal	Basilique Notre-Dame de Montréal	
Union leader	Louis Laberge	2002	Montreal	Basilique Cathédrale Marie-Reine-du-Monde	
Athlete	Jean Béliveau	2014	Montreal	Basilique Cathédrale Marie-Reine-du-Monde	
Music producer and agent	René Angélil	2016	Montreal	Basilique Notre-Dame de Montréal	
Athlete	Guy Lafleur	2022	Montreal	Basilique Cathédrale Marie-Reine-du-Monde	
Musician- Les Cowboys Fringants	Karl Tremblay	2023	Montreal	Centre Bell	
Musician	Jean-Pierre Ferland	2024	Montreal	Basilique Cathédrale Marie-Reine-du-Monde	

== List of provincial commemoration ceremonies in Canada ==
=== Alberta ===
State position	Name	Date of ceremony	Place of ceremony	Building	Sources
Queen of Canada	Elizabeth II	19 September 2022	Edmonton	Alberta Legislature Building	

=== British Columbia ===
State position	Name	Date of ceremony	Place of ceremony	Building	Sources
Queen of Canada	Elizabeth II	19 September 2022	Victoria	Christ Church Cathedral	

=== Manitoba ===
State position	Name	Date of ceremony	Place of ceremony	Building	Sources
Queen of Canada	Elizabeth II	19 September 2022	Winnipeg	Cathedral of St John	

=== New Brunswick ===
State position	Name	Date of ceremony	Place of ceremony	Building	Sources
Queen of Canada	Elizabeth II	19 September 2022	Fredericton	Christ Church Cathedral	

=== Newfoundland and Labrador ===
State position	Name	Date of ceremony	Place of ceremony	Building	Sources
Queen of Canada	Elizabeth II	19 September 2022	St John's	Cathedral of St John the Baptist	

=== Nova Scotia ===
State position	Name	Date of ceremony	Place of ceremony	Building	Sources
Royal consort	Prince Philip, Duke of Edinburgh	17 April 2021	Halifax	All Saints Cathedral	
Queen of Canada	Elizabeth II	19 September 2022	Halifax	All Saints Cathedral	

=== Ontario ===
State position	Name	Date of ceremony	Place of ceremony	Building	Sources
Royal consort	Prince Philip, Duke of Edinburgh	17 April 2021	Toronto	Cathedral Church of St James	
Queen of Canada	Elizabeth II	20 September 2022	Toronto	Cathedral Church of St James	
Lieutenant governor	Hilary Weston	17 October 2025	Toronto	St. Paul's Anglican Church	

Weston's funeral was held in the United Kingdom in August 2025. A provincial memorial service was held in the fall in Toronto.

=== Prince Edward Island ===
State position	Name	Date of ceremony	Place of ceremony	Building	Sources
Queen of Canada	Elizabeth II	19 September 2022	Charlottetown	St Peter's Cathedral	

=== Saskatchewan ===
State position	Name	Date of ceremony	Place of ceremony	Building	Sources
Queen consort	Queen Elizabeth, the Queen Mother	9 April 2002			
Queen consort	Queen Elizabeth, the Queen Mother	9 April 2002	Prince Albert		
Queen consort	Queen Elizabeth, the Queen Mother	9 April 2002	Regina	St Paul's Cathedral	
Queen consort	Queen Elizabeth, the Queen Mother	9 April 2002	Saskatoon		
Queen of Canada	Elizabeth II	19 September 2022	Regina	St Paul's Cathedral	

== See also ==
- Death and state funeral of Pierre Trudeau
- Death and state funeral of Jack Layton
- Death and state funeral of Brian Mulroney
