= 207th (Ottawa-Carleton) Battalion, CEF =

- 207th Battalion cap badge
- Active: February 1916–April 11, 1918
- Country: Canada
- Branch: Canadian Expeditionary Force
- Type: Infantry
- Nickname: "MacLean's Athletes"
- Motto: 'This is your flag - Fight for it'
- Colours: laid up in Knox Presbyterian Church on November 16, 1919
- Battle honours: The Great War, 1917

Commanders
- Notable commanders: Lt Col Charles Wesley MacLean

The 207th (Carleton) Battalion, CEF was a battalion of the First World War Canadian Expeditionary Force.

It was organized at Ottawa by Lt Col Charles Wesley MacLean with members recruited by the 43rd Regiment "Duke of Cornwall's Own Rifles" and volunteers from Carleton County and environs beginning in February 1916. Initial training was conducted at Rockcliffe Camp at which time the battalion earned its unofficial nickname "MacLean's Athletes" due to its participation in sports, especially rugby and baseball, although they also participated in hockey, football, and rowing. The 207th football team defeated the Queen's University club and the 205th Tigers to win the 1916 military league championship. Additional training was done at Amherst, Nova Scotia, from January 1917; the battalion sailed from Halifax with a strength of 27 officers and 652 men on June 2, 1917.

The 207th was absorbed by the 7th Reserve Bn, most members of the 207th being used to reinforce the PPCLI, 2nd, 21st and 38th battalions all of which had Ottawa / Eastern Ontario origins, individual members would, however, serve several other units including the 4th, 5th, 20th 24th, 75th, 102nd, and 156th Infantry Battalions as well as the 2nd and 3rd Tunneling Co. C.E.

While in training at Rockcliffe Camp, the battalion published a periodical The WhizBang, 19 issues of which are in the collection of the National Library at Ottawa.

The battalion is perpetuated by The Cameron Highlanders of Ottawa (Duke of Edinburgh's Own).

== Theatre of operations ==
France and Flanders (once absorbed and dispersed)

== Major battles / Battle honours ==
Mount Sorrel; Somme 1916; Ancre Heights; Ancre 1916; Arras 1917, 1918; Vimy 1917; Ypres 1917; Passchendaele; Amiens; Scarpe 1918; Drocourt-Quéant Line; Hindenburg Line; Canal du Nord; Valenciennes; Sambre.

== The 207th Ottawa and Carleton Infantry Battalion, Canadian Expeditionary Force ==
While the 38th Battalion, CEF prepared to sail to England and to the war, the 207th Battalion, the other Canadian Expeditionary Force unit integral to the wartime experience of The Cameron Highlanders of Ottawa, was still in the recruiting and initial training stages back home in Ottawa.

The 207th (Ottawa-Carleton) Overseas Battalion, CEF, was organized on February 1, 1916, under the command of Lieutenant-Colonel Charles Wesley MacLean. MacLean was a Montrealer, a pre-war officer with the 13th Scottish Light Dragoons, and had already served overseas during the war with the Canadian Army Service Corps in the 2nd Canadian Division. Headquartered in Ottawa, the 207th's recruiting area was defined primarily as Carleton County, although recruits did come to the unit from the city as well.

Like many of the later infantry battalions, the 207th was largely created through the efforts of a single man or a handful of individuals trying to raise a formed unit for service overseas. Starting in February 1916, Lieutenant-Colonel MacLean and his officers successfully recruited enough soldiers to man the 207th. A total of 1,400 recruits signed on with the battalion, 600 of whom were eventually rejected for service on various medical or disciplinary grounds.

== Recruiting ==
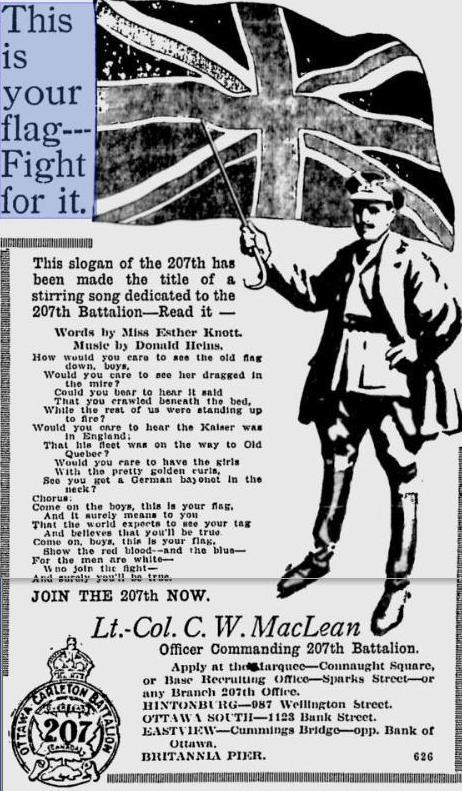
Recruitment advertisement for the 207th Battalion includes a song dedicated to 207th and various locations to enlist

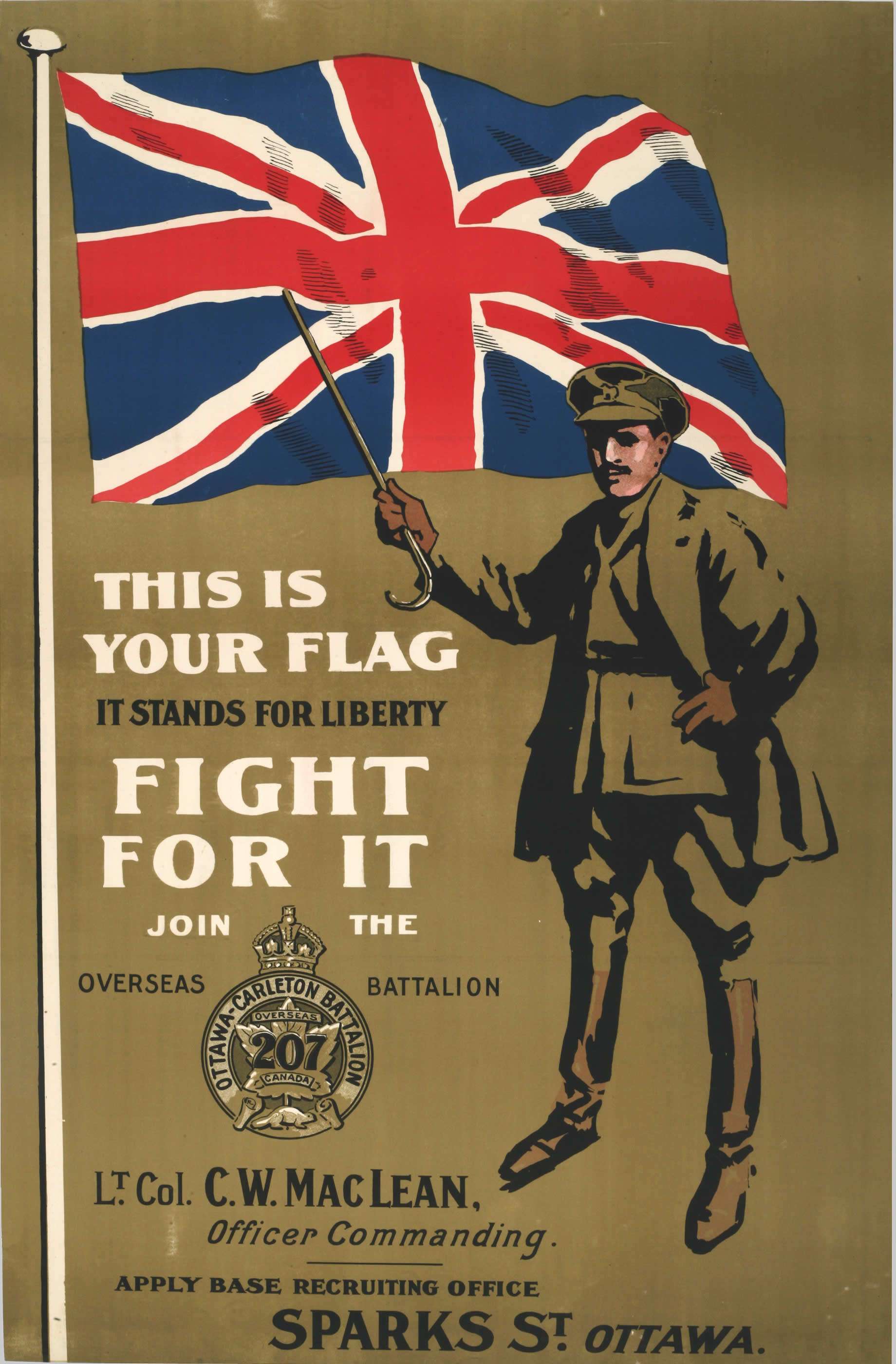
Recruitment poster for the 207th Battalion

During the First World War, the 207th (Ottawa-Carleton) Battalion, CEF encouraged locals to enlist at the Marquee at Connaught Square, Base Recruiting Office on Sparks Street, any Branch 207th Office, Hintonburg 987 Wellington Street, Ottawa South 1123 Bank Street, Eastview Cumming Bridge, or at the Britannia Pier. A slogan of the 207, 'This is your flag -Fight for it,' was made the title of a song dedicated to the 207th with words by Miss Esther Knott and music by Donald Helms. On June 26, 1916, the Soldier's Service Club of Ottawa's programs of music, dancing and in concert attracted crowds to the Britannia Boating Club to raise money to establish amusement places in six Canadian camps that lacked entertainment halls. The crowd of thousands enjoyed musical entertainment in the auditorium, dancing to the Tippins' orchestra in the clubhouse, band concerts in the parks and a spirit of carnival. The ladies made costumes for the minstrel show at the carnival as well as an earlier show held at the Russell Theatre earlier in the season. Invitations were sent to convalescent soldiers at the Fleming home, who attended as guests of the club. This was the first carnival of its kind held in any Canadian city.

The 207th received an even larger proportion of its personnel from the 43rd Regiment (men who were either members of the regiment at that time or who were recruited by it for overseas service) than the 38th had when it was raised one year earlier. After the war, statistics would reveal that of the 1,400 men who tried to join the 207th Battalion, 724 came from the 43rd. This included seventeen of the twenty-seven officers that sailed with the battalion when it left Canada in June 1917. Among the 43rd's representatives in the officer corps were Major Fred Demille Burpee (officer commanding No. 1 Company), Major Charles Erich Stewart (officer commanding No. 3 Company), Captain John Gordon MacLachlan (adjutant), Honorary Captain Francis Chevers McElroy (quartermaster and acting paymaster), Captain John Lewis McInnes (chaplain and platoon commander), and Lieutenant Edward Thomas Mennie (officer commanding Machine Gun Section).

Bringing the 207th up to strength was much more difficult that it had been for the earlier units attempting to recruit men in the Ottawa area. The formation of Princess Patricia's Canadian Light Infantry, the 2nd, 21st, 38th, and 77th Battalions, and legions of combat support units had absorbed much of the local male population of fighting age long before the spring of 1916. With a geographically large recruiting area to draw from, Lieutenant-Colonel MacLean was forced to purchase four cars out of his own pocket to allow his recruiting officers to properly carry out their duties. He also proposed the construction of a model redoubt (a small fortress) as a recruiting attraction on Connaught Place, a wide bridge and park area running along what is now Wellington Street between Parliament and the Chateau Laurier. The redoubt was to be placed approximately where the National War Memorial now stands and was to be built by the local Engineer Training Depot using 2,500 sandbags. While the engineers were eager for the practice the project would give their sappers it was, ultimately, turned down by higher militia authorities, as it was "not thought that the expense is justified."

The soldiers of the 207th were placed in barracks in Ottawa. While recruiting proceeded, medical examinations were carried out and the sub-unit infrastructure was formed. Early training, including basic drill, care of weapons, and rapid-fire and fire discipline techniques, was carried out at the battalion's headquarters in a building on the corner of Albert and Metcalfe Streets. The soldiers were provided with uniforms and issued kit and weapons, including the Ross rifle. On June 26 the 207th gathered its personnel together and marched off to Rockcliffe Camp for battalion-level training.

While in Rockcliffe the battalion carried out route marches during the day and at night, about twice a week. Some of these were as long as 30 kilometres (19 mi), "with no ill effects to the men". Perhaps somewhat naively, a later report on the marches noted: "They were found of great benefit in getting the men accustomed to long marches, also giving them a good idea as to the actual war conditions, as far as could be arranged during training in Canada."

Much of the training focused on rifle practice. The soldiers used the rifle range on a daily basis and every one of them (except for the "lately joined recruits") was able to fire at least twenty rounds there. In total, 600 members of the battalion were able to complete the British fourteen-week-long Syllabus for Infantry course during their time at Rockcliffe. The 207th also formed a machine gun section in June 1916, its twenty-three personnel becoming fully qualified on Colt and Lewis machine guns while in camp.

The 207th was also kept busy with other duties, such as inspections by the Governor-General, the Duke of Connaught, on August 10 and October 6, 1916. On September 1, 100 soldiers and the battalion's bands formed a guard of honour at the laying of the cornerstone for the new Parliament Buildings being constructed to replace the buildings which had burned down the previous February. Other guards of honour were also supplied in late 1916 and early 1917 before the battalion left the city. Also notable during the 207th's time in Rockcliffe was the publication of a regimental newsletter, "The Whizz Bang", nineteen issues of which were produced by the battalion between July 1 and November 4, 1916.

The battalion incorporated both brass and bugle bands. The brass band was led by a member of the 43rd Regiment, Lieutenant J.M. Brown, and included twenty-two members, while the bugle band was forty-two strong. Used primarily for recruiting purposes, both bands also provided "the necessary music for marching, whenever required."

== MacLean's Athletes ==
However, the 207th was best known for what it truly specialized at, aside from soldiering. This was sports, an activity which gave the battalion the nickname "MacLean's Athletes". Canadian rugby (later known as Canadian football) was the unit's particular speciality. On October 14, 1916, the 207th's rugby team crushed the Queen's University team by a score of 43–8. It travelled to Hamilton at the end of the month, beating the Hamilton Tigers (the 205th Battalion's team) by a score of 32-3 and later defeated the Tigers in Lansdowne Park by a score of 24–8. By the end of the year, the 207th was the champion of the Khaki Interprovincial Rugby Football League. The battalion's baseball team won the city of Ottawa baseball league championship the same year.

== Presentation of colours ==
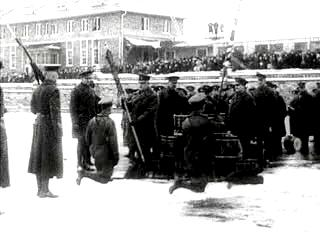
Sir Sam Hughes inspects 207th Battalion and presents colours, 18 November 1916

After nearly four months of initial training, the battalion left Rockcliffe, returning to its Ottawa barracks on October 20. Like the 38th Battalion, the 207th was presented with king's and regimental colours on Parliament Hill. Lieutenant-General Sam Hughes, in his final public act as Minister of Militia, presented the colours, a gift from the American Bank Note Company, a local firm, on November 18, 1916. The colours are laid up, accompanied by a plaque, at Knox Presbyterian Church (Ottawa).

== Preparation for deployment ==
Despite all of his efforts to form a fighting battalion, Lieutenant-Colonel MacLean still did not know what the fate of his unit would be within the Canadian Expeditionary Force. In hindsight, it's easy to see that the 207th was destined to be a reinforcement unit for front-line Canadian units. By mid-December MacLean had discovered out that no more infantry battalions would be sent overseas as anything other than large reinforcement drafts. He immediately submitted a proposal to Militia Headquarters regarding the fate of the 207th. MacLean suggested that it be converted into a railway construction battalion, arguing that of the 750 soldiers currently on the battalion's strength, 600 could be used to form the core of a railway unit, the other 150 being sent as an infantry reinforcement draft overseas. He noted: "You will notice that we have, in our Battalion, a good many civil engineers, public land surveyors, railway superintendents, section foremen, drivers, saddlers, and tailors."

Although no response to his proposal was found in the documentary record, the 207th was never converted. Nevertheless, a later infantry battalion raised in Ottawa, the 257th Overseas Battalion, was reformed as a railway construction unit, serving in France and Flanders from 1917 to 1919 as the 7th Battalion, Canadian Railway Troops.

As 1917 began the 207th's time in Ottawa came to a close and the battalion prepared to move closer to overseas deployment. Before leaving Ottawa, the battalion was inspected by Brigadier-General T.D.R. Hemming, the 3rd Divisional Area commander. He was quite impressed with the officers, non-commissioned officers, and men, remarking: "A very good class of men. Good physique and intelligent." The general discipline of the men was also reported as "very good". It was also noted that no soldiers from the battalion had been court-martialled during its eleven months in existence in the nation's capital.

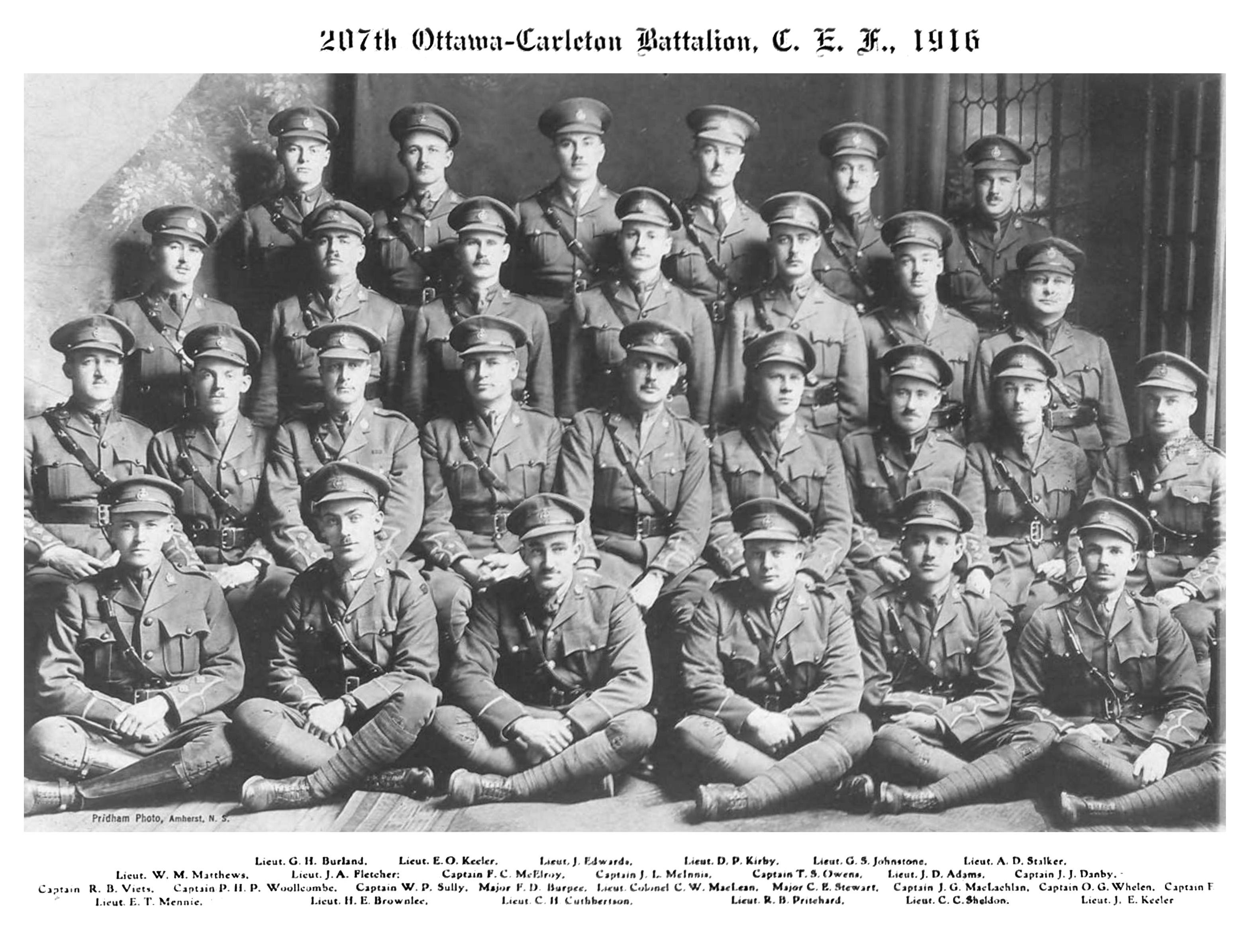
Officers of the 207th

== To Nova Scotia ==
On January 18, 1917, the 207th left Ottawa for the Maritimes departing by train for Amherst, Nova Scotia, for further training. The battalion arrived two days later. Training at Amherst followed the "Regular War Office Syllabus", the troops receiving instruction in such subjects as bombing (grenades) and scouting. The battalion's training regime was suddenly interrupted in late February and March 1917 because of an outbreak of infectious diseases in Amherst. On March 1 two cases of scarlet fever, two cases of German measles, and seven cases of mumps were reported in the 207th. Medical authorities believed the unit to be on the verge of an epidemic and immediate measures were taken with respect to the sanitary conditions of the soldiers' accommodations.

By the end of March, the situation had worsened. Ten members of the battalion had German measles, another fifteen the mumps, six scarlet fever, and another two diphtheria. All of these men were in a local hospital "convalescing". Of 710 officers and men with the 207th in Amherst by this point, a total of 104 were sent to the local hospital during March suffering from an infectious disease. By April 18 the battalion, the only CEF unit in Amherst, was still quarantined. It was little consolation that it wasn't the only battalion suffering, as five other units were quarantined in camps in other parts of Nova Scotia and New Brunswick at the time.

The 207th's medical crisis was not only a trial for the battalion; it also affected the reinforcement pool for Canada's battalions overseas. On April 20 the Militia authorities in Ottawa suggested that the general officer commanding the troops in Military District No. 6 be told that "every available n.c.o. and man of the 207th, who is not a contact, or suspect, must be sent overseas this month, regardless of whether the unit is broken up or not. It is necessary to fill up the [troop] transports, and nothing is to be gained by keeping whole battalions or units back in Canada, in order to enable them to proceed overseas, complete. The sooner we get all the medically sound, fit, uninfected officers and men out of M.D. 6, the better."

However, the partial deployment of the 207th overseas did not happen and, on April 30, the battalion was reported to be "free from infection". Nevertheless, for two members of the 207th, the epidemic was fatal, as Company Quartermaster-Sergeant Ernest William Painter and Pte. William Metheral died of pleuro pneumonia on February 27 and March 3 respectively while stationed in Amherst. Unrelated to the epidemic, Private Louis Lavaillee was found dead in his bed on the morning of March 17. A Court of Inquiry found that he died from the effects of heavy drinking the night before combined with drinking another soldier's prescribed medicine containing opium. Four other members of the battalion: Sergeant Oswald Olson and Privates John Joseph Hallinan, and Ernest Samuel Povah – all from pulmonary tuberculosis – and John Milton Howard from an ulcerated stomach, died in Canada between then and the end of the war, all members of the 207th Battalion at the time. As a result, seven men died wearing the cap badge of the 207th (Ottawa-Carleton) Overseas Battalion.

== Overseas ==
Finally, on May 28 the battalion left Amherst for Halifax, the journey overseas about to begin.

The 207th Battalion's journey overseas began on June 2, 1917, when the unit left Halifax on board the troopship S.S. Olympic. Eight days later the battalion arrived in Liverpool, England, the voyage being described as "entirely uneventful". After a brief train ride to Seaford Camp in Sussex, the 207th was placed under the command of Canadian Troops, Seaford. On the very same day, the battalion's independent existence came to an end when the 7th Reserve Battalion, CEF, "absorbed" the battalion and all of its twenty-seven officers and 652 other ranks. The officer signing the order was the officer commanding Seaford Camp, Colonel Stanley Douglas Gardner, M.C. Ironically, Colonel Gardner would become the commanding officer of the 38th Battalion in France on August 29, 1918.

Technically, the 207th didn't cease to exist at this point. It simply became a reinforcement-holding unit, ready to supply officers and men to other units that needed them. For example, 200 non-commissioned officers and men were sent to the 156th Battalion in Witley Camp on June 13. Another twenty other ranks joined them four days later, never to return to the 207th, but eventually finding their way to the front with a fighting battalion.

As the numbers of reinforcements sent to the front grew, the 207th, in effect, faded away. Eventually, the battalion sent 157 soldiers to the 2nd Battalion, 118 to Princess Patricia's Canadian Light Infantry, ninety-two to the 38th Battalion, sixty-six to the 21st Battalion, and the rest spread over a variety of other units. Sixty-two of these soldiers were killed in action or died from their wounds or disease. The units with which these men passed into history ranged from various infantry battalions to the 5th Battalion, Canadian Railway Troops, to the 3rd Tunnelling Company, Canadian Engineers. Not surprisingly, many of the greatest losses of former 207th soldiers were suffered in the infantry's 2nd Battalion (thirteen), the PPCLI (eight), and the 21st Battalion (eight). However, the largest number of 207th men (twenty-two in total) who died did so, perhaps appropriately, as members of the 38th Battalion, CEF their sister unit from Ottawa.

While serving with their new units, two former 207th men were decorated for bravery. Captain Edward Thomas Mennie was awarded the Military Cross with the 38th Battalion, CEF before dying of his wounds on November 7, 1918, and Private James Arthur Robertson was awarded the Military Medal with the 38th before being killed in action on September 2, 1918. Notable, too, was Private Nelson Taylor who was killed in action with the 38th on November 15, 1917, at the young age of seventeen.

== Post war ==
Its ranks depleted, the 207th Battalion was disbanded on April 11, 1918. The last symbol of the 207th Battalion, the King's and Regimental Colours, remained in Westminster Abbey with no one to retrieve them. Finally, on September 5, 1919, Captain Duguid, a member of the 15th Battalion, CEF, gathered them up and brought them back to where they were laid up in Knox Presbyterian Church (Ottawa) on November 16, 1919. In 1929, the battalion was awarded the theatre of war honour "The Great War, 1917".

== See also ==
- The Canadian Crown and the Canadian Forces
- Military history of Canada
- History of the Canadian Army
- Canadian Forces
