= Église Unie St-Marc =

Coordinates: 45.416201°N 75.6885°W

Église Unie St-Marc (St. Mark United Church)
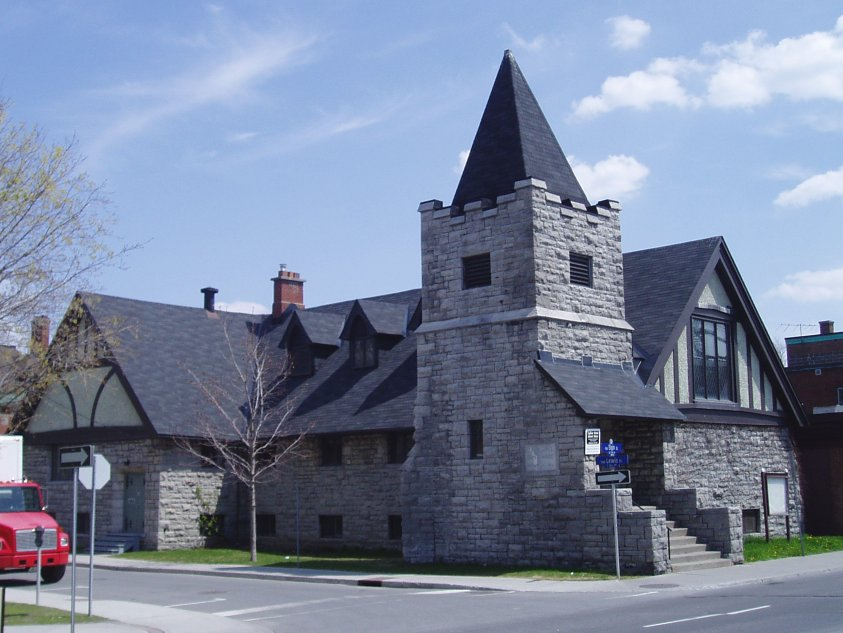
- Église Unie St-Marc (St. Mark United Church)
- Église Unie St-Marc (St. Mark United Church)
- Location: Ottawa, Canada
- Country: Canada
- Denomination: United Church of Canada
- Previous denomination: Presbyterian Unitarian

History
- Status: Cathedral

Architecture
- Functional status: Active
- Architectural type: Norman-Gothic

Église Unie St-Marc (St. Mark United Church) is a small but historic church in Ottawa, Canada. It is the main church for francophone Protestants in the Ottawa Gatineau region. French speaking Protestants are a very small minority in Canada, but one with a history dating back to early Huguenot settlers.

== History ==
The Ottawa church was founded as a Presbyterian congregation in 1874, and its first building was located in the Lebreton Flats. It joined the United Church of Canada upon its creation in 1925. In the 1960s its original home was expropriated by the federal government, along with the other buildings on the flats. The church then moved to its current building in Centretown at the corner of Elgin and 142 Lewis streets, next to Minto Park. This small building had been built in 1900 to house the First Unitarian Congregation of Ottawa, but seeking larger premises they moved to the western part of the city and sold the building to St-Marc in 1965. Jacques de Réland had served as minister from 1982.

In 2021, heritage work orders were issued to fix cracks in the tower. By 2024, the tower had been demolished, and the congregation had moved to the former St. Paul's Eastern United Church building.
