= O'Connor Street =

Street in Ottawa, Canada

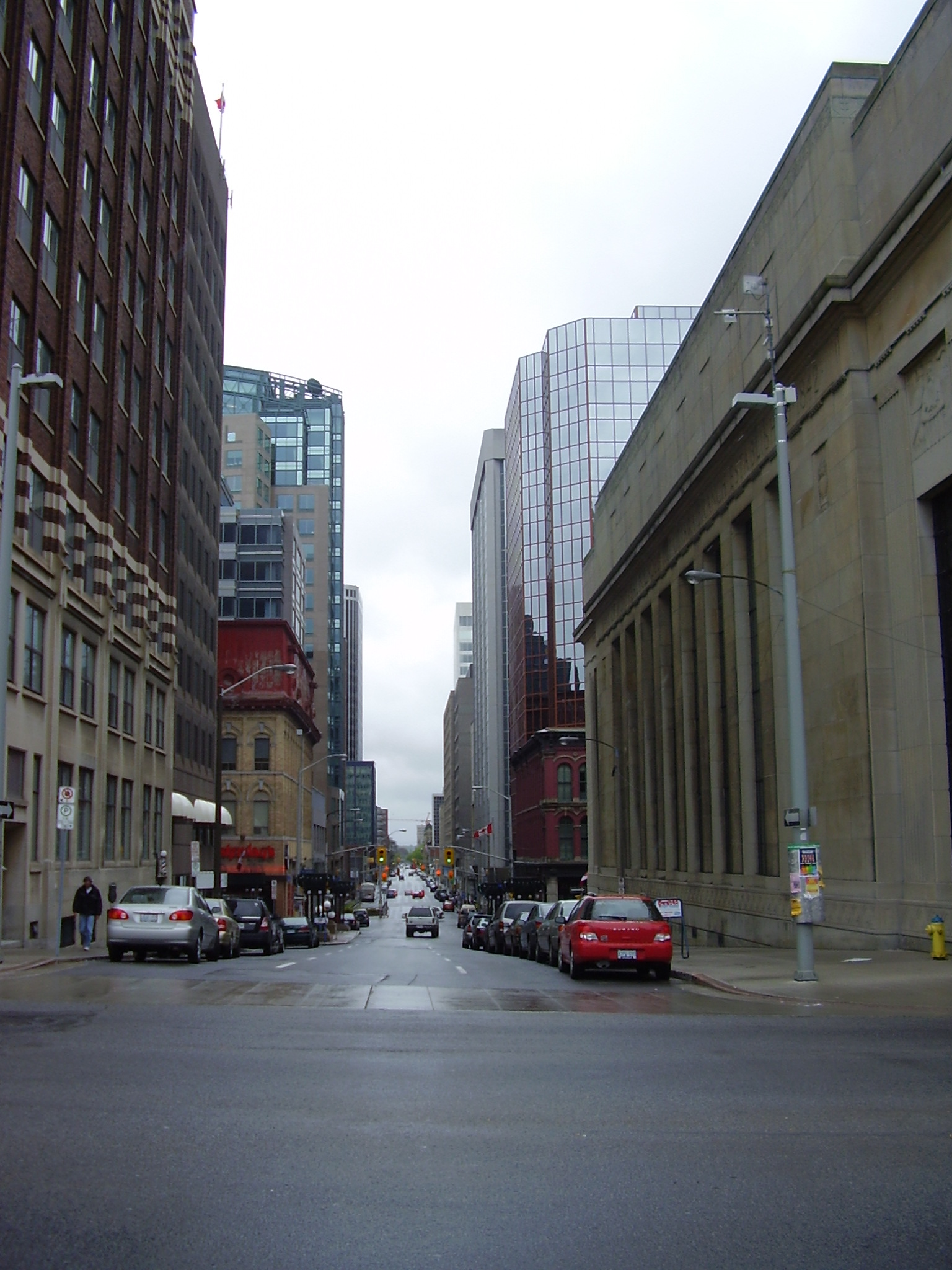
O'Connor Street at Wellington in 2006.

O'Connor Street is a downtown arterial road in Ottawa, Ontario, Canada. It is a north–south route, operating one way southbound, providing a key thoroughfare parallel to Bank Street.

The roadway begins at Wellington Street, at Parliament Hill, proceeding south towards the Queensway (Highway 417) where there is a westbound on-ramp. South of the Queensway, O'Connor continues as a local street in The Glebe neighbourhood until it reaches its southern terminus at Holmwood Avenue.

A two-way cycle track was built along the east side of the street in 2016.

== Major intersections ==
(from North to South):

- Wellington Street
- Sparks Street
- Albert Street
- Slater Street
- Laurier Avenue
- Somerset Street
- Gladstone Avenue
- Catherine Street
- Highway 417 (Queensway)
- Isabella Street
- Fifth Avenue
- Holmwood Avenue

== See also ==
- Dominion-Chalmers United Church (O'Connor at Lisgar)
- High Commission of Australia in Ottawa
- Ottawa Curling Club (at 440 O'Connor)
