= 1500 Bronson Avenue =

Historic building in Ontario, Canada

Coordinates: 45°22′42″N 75°41′15″W

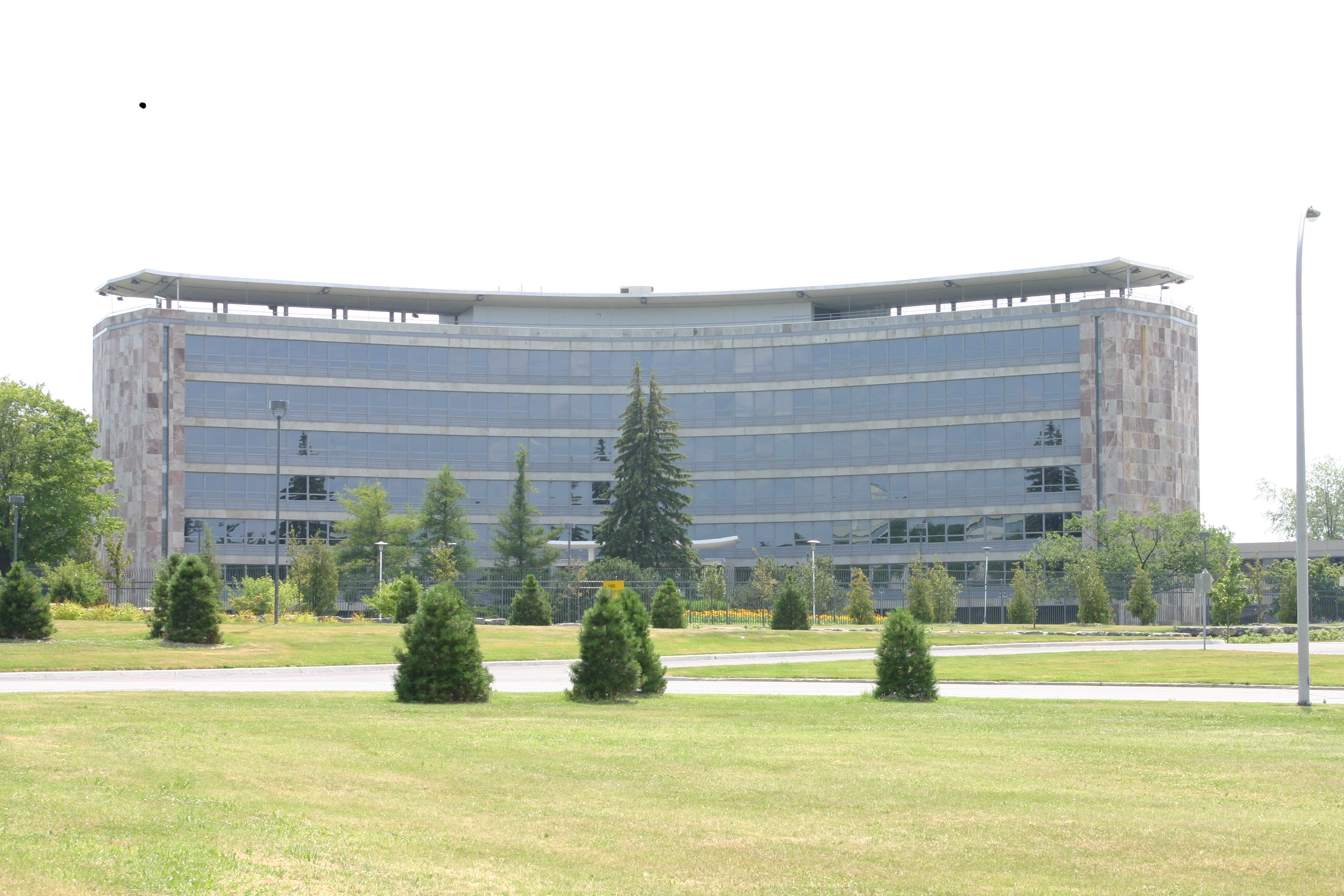
- Interactive map of the 1500 Bronson Avenue area
- Former names: CBC Building, Edward Drake Building

General information
- Status: Completed
- Architectural style: Modernist
- Location: 1500 Bronson Avenue; Ottawa, Ontario; K1G 3J5
- Construction started: 1961
- Completed: 1964

Technical details
- Floor count: 6

Design and construction
- Architect: D.G. McKinstry

1500 Bronson Avenue (formerly the CBC Building and the Edward Drake Building) is a modernist office building in Ottawa, Ontario, owned by Public Services and Procurement Canada. It was designed by the Canadian Broadcasting Corporation's chief architect David Gordon McKinstry and constructed between 1961 and 1964.

It originally served as the headquarters of the Canadian Broadcasting Corporation, but significant CBC budget cutbacks in the 1990s led to the relocation of the head office staff in 1997. The building was later used by the Communications Security Establishment (CSE). During CSE's period occupying the building it was renamed in honour of Lt. Colonel Edward Drake, the first director of CSE's predecessor organisation, the Communications Branch of the National Research Council.

CSE moved its operations out of the building in stages from 2014 to 2015, after a new purpose-built headquarters for the agency was completed in Ottawa's east end. That new CSE campus was then officially named the Edward Drake Building, taking the name from their former location.

1500 Bronson Avenue occupies a large site bordered by Riverside Drive, Heron Road and Bronson Avenue. For more than four decades, it has been a landmark in south Ottawa as it is set apart from any other buildings, and it was particularly known for the large CBC/Radio Canada logo on one wing of the building (since removed). It has been designated as a "classified federal heritage building," which means that it is a federal government building that has been assigned the highest level of heritage protection.

== See also ==
- Victoria Building (Ottawa) - CBC Head Office 1938-1964
- CBC Ottawa Broadcast Centre - CBC Head Office since 2004
