= Victoria Building (Ottawa) =

Federal office building in Ottawa, Canada

Coordinates: 45.4226°N 75.69947°W

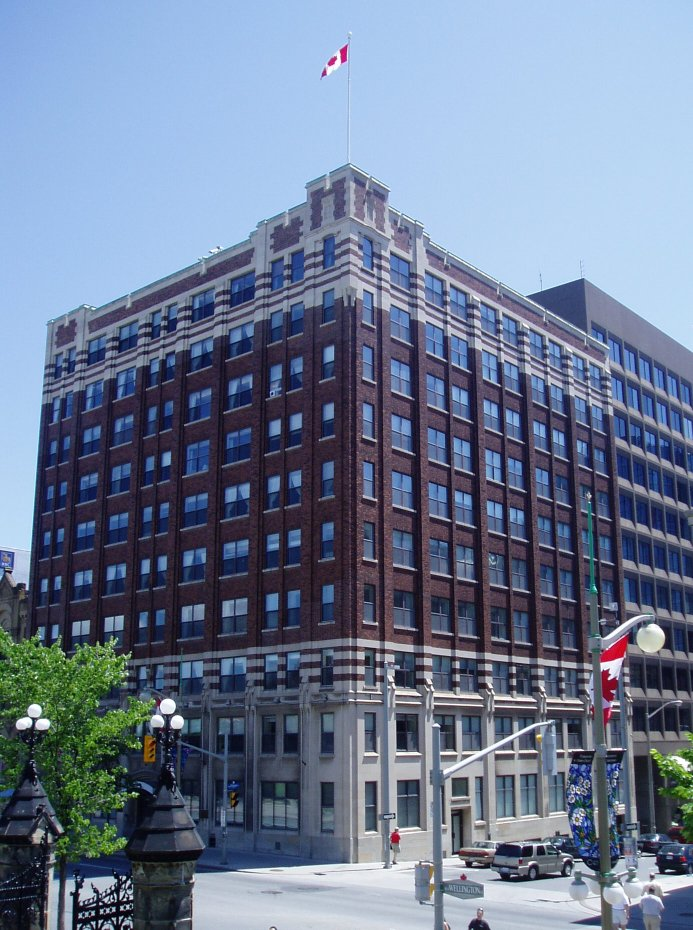
The Victoria Building at the corner of Wellington Street and O'Connor

The Victoria Building is an Art Deco office building in Ottawa, Ontario, Canada. It is located at 140 Wellington Street, just across from the Parliament of Canada. It houses the offices of a number of parliamentarians, mostly members of the Senate of Canada. The building, designed by John Albert Ewart, was completed in 1928 by private developers, though the federal government quickly leased much of it. It has held a wide variety of tenants. It was the first home of the Embassy of France (1928-1939) and the Bank of Canada from 1935 to 1938. It also housed the Japanese legation in 1931 to 1941. From 1938 to 1964 it housed the CBC and for a time was also the home of Ashbury College. The federal government took over the building in 1973 and in 2003 it was renovated. Prior to 1928 it was occupied by Victoria Chambers (built in 1902 replacing and smaller Bank of Ottawa building.

== See also ==
- 1500 Bronson Avenue
- Royal eponyms in Canada
