= John Albert Ewart =

Canadian architect (1872–1964)

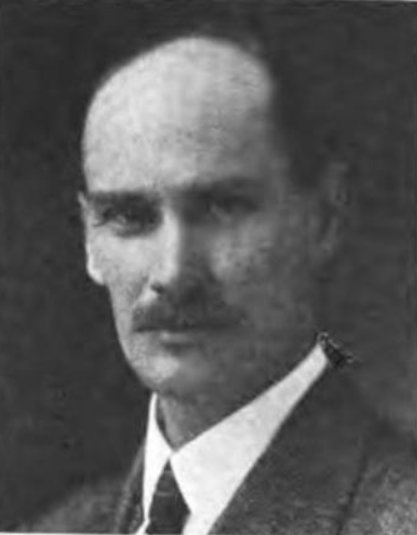
- Born: April 20, 1872; Ottawa, Ontario, Canada
- Died: April 21, 1964 (aged 92); Ottawa, Ontario, Canada
- Education: University of Toronto
- Occupation: Architect
- Buildings: Knox Presbyterian Church (Ottawa)

John Albert Ewart (April 20, 1872 – April 21, 1964) was a Canadian architect and son of Chief Dominion Architect David Ewart.

== Personal and early years ==
Ewart was born in Ottawa on April 20, 1872, after his father's arrival in Canada. Ewart studied architecture at the University of Toronto in the 1890s.

== Career ==
Eward moved to Ottawa to practice with King Arnoldi in 1895 and Burritt & Meredith in 1904, and Sproatt & Rolph in 1932. His buildings are built mostly in Ottawa with a few in nearby Pembroke, Ontario and Carleton Place, Ontario.

== Death ==
Ewart died in Ottawa on April 21, 1964.

== Portfolio ==
List of buildings designed by Ewart include:

- Booth Building, 1910–11
- Transportation Building, 1916
- Hunter Building, 1917–20
- Metropolitan Life Building, 1924-27 (associate of Waid)
- Ottawa Electric Building, 1926–27
- Victoria Building, 1927–28
- Architect to Ottawa Collegiate Institute Board
- Knox Presbyterian Church (Ottawa) 1932

== Gallery ==
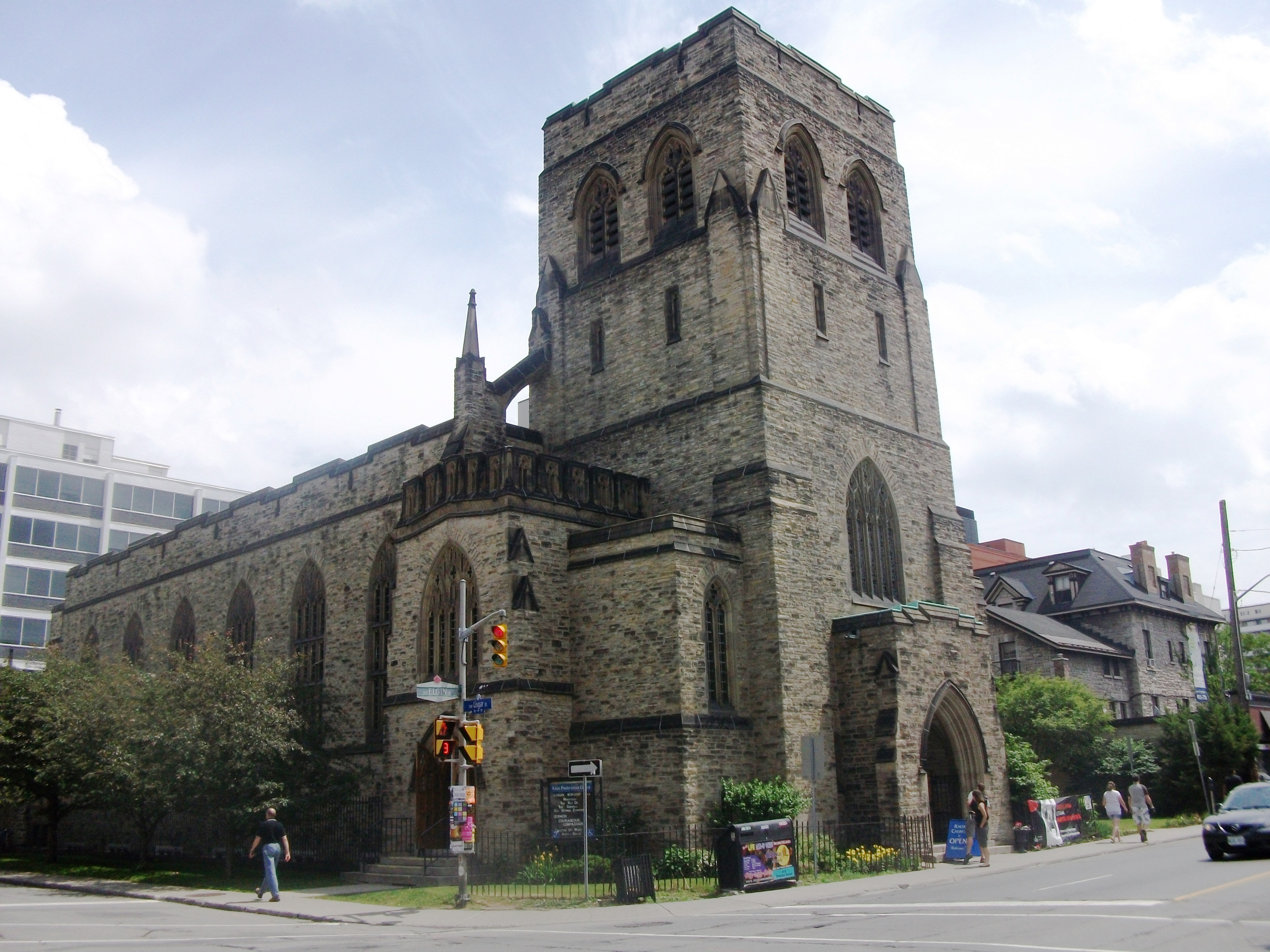
Knox Presbyterian Church (Ottawa)

== See also ==
- John Ewart (architect)
