= Dominion-Chalmers United Church =

Coordinates: 45.416784°N 75.69506°W

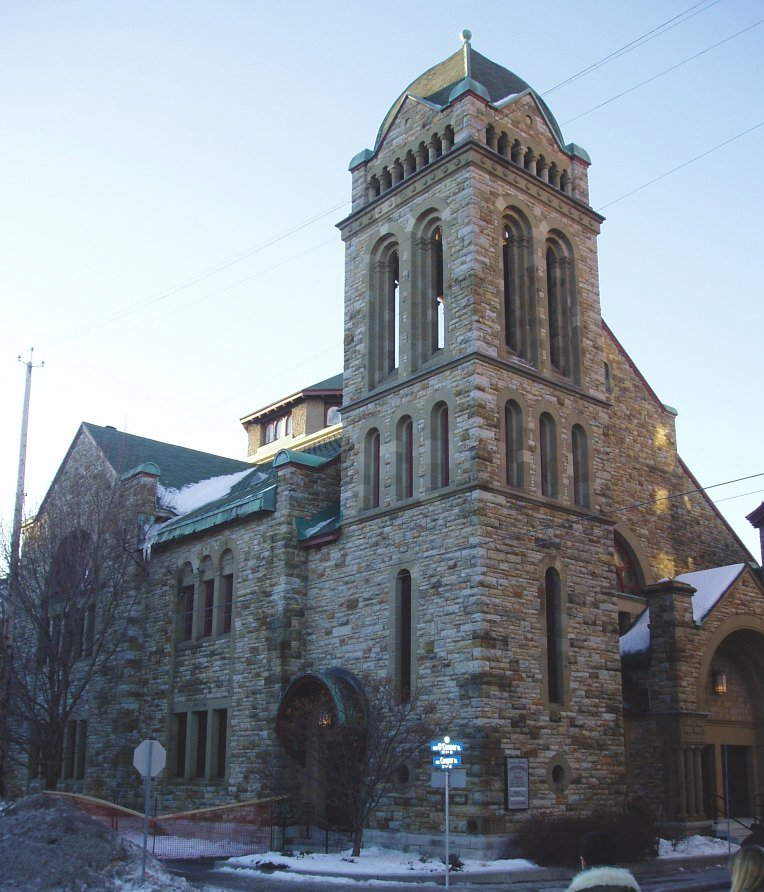
- Dominion-Chalmers United Church
- Dominion-Chalmers United Church
- Location: 355 Cooper at O'Connor Streets, Ottawa, Ontario
- Country: Canada
- Denomination: United Church of Canada
- Previous denomination: Presbyterian

History
- Status: Cathedral

Architecture
- Functional status: Active
- Architect: Alexander Cowper Hutchison
- Architectural type: Norman-Gothic
- Style: Romanesque Revival
- Groundbreaking: 1912

Dominion Chalmers United Church is a large United church, located in downtown Ottawa, at the corner of Cooper and O'Connor Streets (with access from Lisgar Street). It is a 1962 merger of two key congregations from both the Methodist and Presbyterian traditions, each possessing lengthy histories.

== History ==
Chalmers Presbyterian/United Church, was originally Bank Street Canada Presbyterian Church, located on nearby Bank Street at Slater Street from 1866 to 1914. Alexander Cowper Hutchison (architect) designed the Bank Street Presbyterian Church at Bank Street at Slater Street in 1868.

The Bank Street Presbyterian Church building was reconstructed by the architect William Hodgson in 1881 after a fire. Alexander Cowper Hutchison designed the Bank Street Presbyterian Sunday School in 1890.

The Bank Street Presbyterian Church was renamed after Thomas Chalmers, a leader of the 1843 disruption in the Church of Scotland that led to the formation of the Free Church, and in Ottawa, their "parent" congregation of Knox Presbyterian, is now located just two blocks east on Lisgar at Elgin Street. Alexander Cowper Hutchison designed the Chalmers Presbyterian Church on O'Connor Street at Cooper Street, 1912–1914.

The Metcalfe Street building was built in 1830 as Metcalfe Street Methodist. In 1852 this group merged with those from Rideau Street, and the building was enlarged and renamed The Dominion in 1876. The Dominion Methodist Church, which was located on Metcalfe Street at Queen Street, was designed by the architect Henry Hodge Horsey and built between 1875 and 1876. The Dominion Methodist plaque lists Alexis Helmer, whose death was the inspiration for John McCrae's poem, "In Flanders Fields".

The building was destroyed in a fire in February 1961.

The Dominion Methodist/United Church's roots go back to Methodist circuit riders visitations in Hull, Lower Canada from 1816, and a wooden structure built on Rideau Street in the Lower Town in 1827.

The Dominion-Chalmers (or DC Church) buildings have recently undergone major renovations to their large sanctuary (damaged by a fire in 1955), and is used for concerts; and for other special events, sometimes of a national nature.

== The Carleton Dominion-Chalmers Centre ==
In 2018, Carleton University purchased the church building as a performance space, though the congregation will continue to use the building for religious services as well. After its repossession, it was officially renamed the Carleton Dominion-Chalmers Centre, although it is sometimes incorrectly referred to as the amalgamated Carleton Dominion-Chalmers United Centre. Mara Brown was announced as this extension's first director on 1 April 2019, effective 15 April 2019. Prior to this appointment, on 26 March 2019, the university held a festival of life celebration for Professor Pius Adesanmi, Director of Carleton's Institute of African Studies; one of 18 Canadian persons to have died in a tragic plane crash on 10 March 2019.

== State funerals ==
Several Canadian state funerals have been held in the building: of George Eulas Foster in 1932, Sidney Earle Smith in 1959, and Ed Broadbent in 2024.
