= St. Paul's Eastern United Church =

St Paul's Eastern United Church
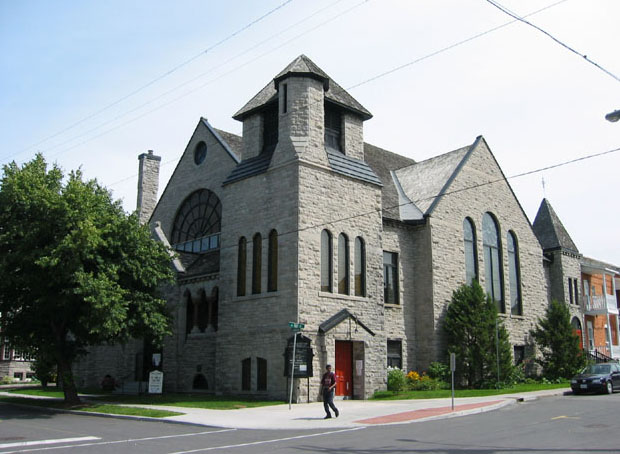
- St. Paul's-Eastern United Church at 473 Cumberland Street
- St Paul's Eastern United Church
- Denomination: United Church of Canada

Architecture
- Functional status: Active
- Architect: S.R. Badgley
- Architectural type: Romanesque

Administration
- Province: Ontario; Ottawa Conference

St. Paul's-Eastern United Church is one of the oldest congregations in Ottawa, Ontario, Canada. The stone Romanesque church building is located in the heart of downtown Ottawa (Sandy Hill) on the corner of Daly and Cumberland Streets, near the University of Ottawa and two blocks east of the Rideau Centre.

== History ==
The Romanesque Revival structure was built from 1888 to 1889 for St. Paul's Presbyterian Church by S.R. Badgley, architect. It originally had a large steeple. Unfortunately the church was built on sand, and the steeple side started sinking into the ground. The steeple was therefore removed early in the 20th century, leaving the building as a relatively squat stone structure.

With the creation of the United Church of Canada in 1925, St. Paul's merged with the nearby Eastern Methodist Church and got its current name.

In the late part of the 20th century the church struggled. The growing secularization of Canadian society and the smaller number of people living downtown meant that the church was rarely more than half full and the Sunday school had only a handful of children.

More recently (2003–2021), the church had experienced a revitalization in activity, membership, finances and Sunday School involvement. Most of the new people coming to St. Paul's-Eastern were young families and young singles.

St. Paul's-Eastern had a number of groups and partners who operate out of the church. They include: Jericho Road and Touch of Love. Other groups such as Girl Guides and Alcoholics Anonymous also operate out of the church.

== St. Paul's today ==
The church closed in 2021 following the covid crisis and the congregation disbanded. By 2024, the building was temporarily used by the Église Unie St-Marc as its own church building had been unavailable with the demolition of its tower.

== See also ==
- List of designated heritage properties in Ottawa
