= Timeline of the Canadian Broadcasting Corporation =

The CBC Radio-Canada logo.

This is a timeline of the history of the Canadian Broadcasting Corporation.

== 1901–1925 ==
- 1901
  - First transatlantic wireless signal from Cornwall to Newfoundland.
- 1902
  - First wireless telegraphy station at Glace Bay, Nova Scotia.
- 1905
  - Canada's first Wireless Telegraph Act.
- 1913
  - Radio Telegraph Act includes voice transmission.
- 1919
  - First broadcasting licence issued to XWA Montreal (later CINW).
- 1922
  - First licensing of private commercial stations.
- 1923
  - Canadian National Railway starts radio service to trains.
- 1924
  - CN Radio opens its first stations (Ottawa and Moncton) and gradually develops service on about 15 stations.

== 1926–1975 ==
- 1927
  - First national broadcast: July 1, Diamond Jubilee of Confederation.
- 1929
  - Aird Commission recommends setting up a nationally owned company to operate a coast-to-coast system.
- 1930
  - Canadian Radio League is organized.
  - First Canadian television experiments are conducted.
- 1932
  - First Parliamentary Committee on Broadcasting. Canadian Broadcasting Act creates the Canadian Radio Broadcasting Commission (CRBC).
- 1933
  - The CRBC acquires CN Radio facilities, improves coverage and continues program development.
- 1936
  - November 2, the Canadian Broadcasting Act replaces the CRBC with a Crown Corporation, the Canadian Broadcasting Corporation. The CBC takes over CRBC staff and facilities (eight publicly owned or leased stations and 14 private affiliates).
- 1937
  - Opening of the French station CBF Montreal.
  - New transmitters in Toronto and Montreal increase national coverage to 76% of the population from 49%.
  - The North American Regional Broadcasting Agreement (Havana Treaty) gives Canada better frequencies (ratified 1941).
- 1938
  - Farm broadcasts begin on the French radio network.
- 1939
  - Full coverage of the six-week visit of King George VI and Queen Elizabeth.
  - Declaration of war: a CBC reporting unit goes overseas, and all departments begin special wartime broadcasts.
  - Farm broadcasts begin on the English radio network.

The CBC Radio-Canada symbol from 1940.

- 1940
  - Low-power relay transmitters installed for remote communities.
  - First provincial school broadcasts begin in Nova Scotia and B.C.
  - The CBC symbol showing radio waves and a map of Canada is adopted.

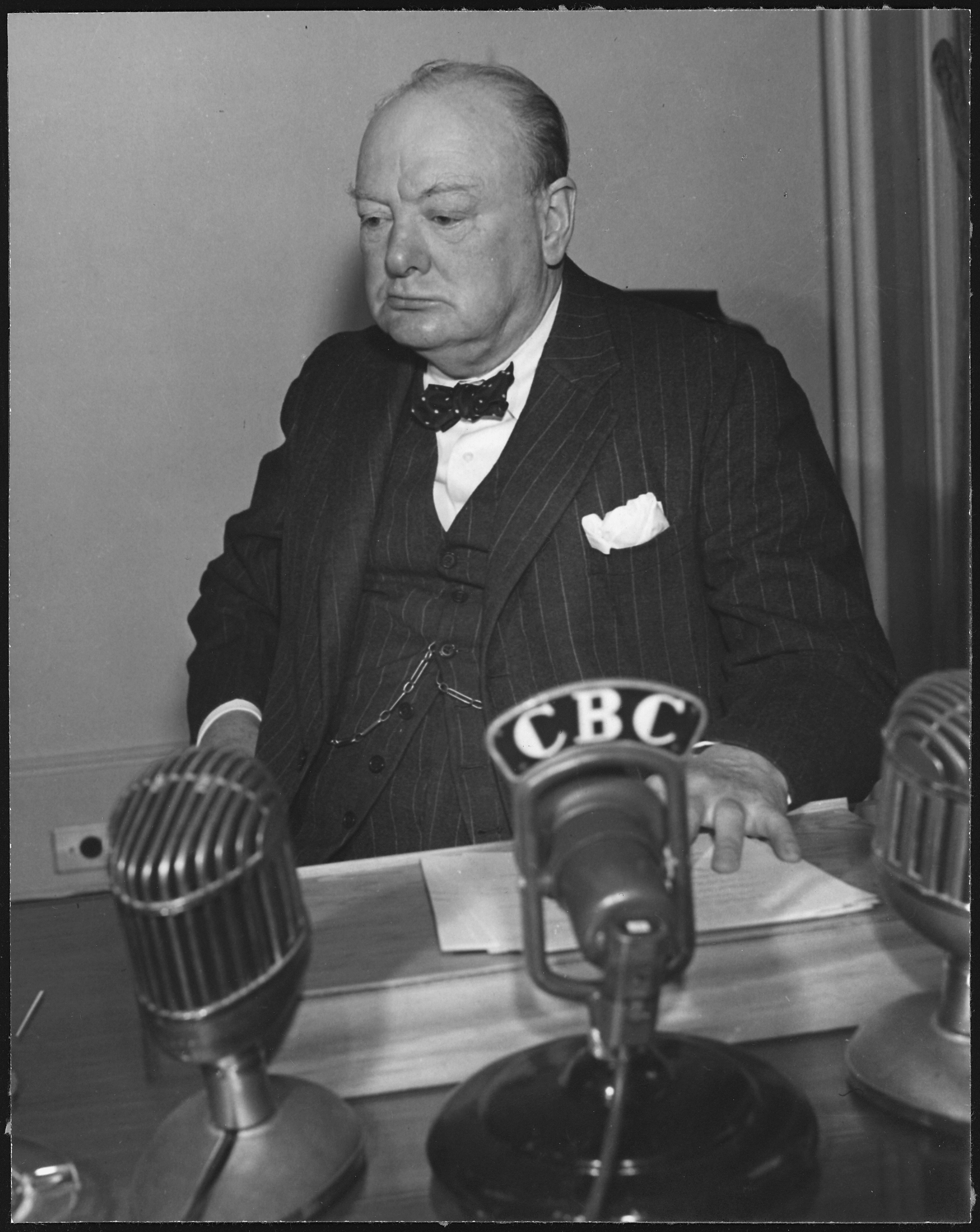
Winston Churchill

- 1941
  - Formal opening of CBC News Service. Special broadcasts include Winston Churchill's speech from the House of Commons in Ottawa.
- 1942
  - A total of 43 hours of French and English programs are broadcast daily, compared with 10 in 1936. Special broadcasts include the opening of the Alaska Highway.
- 1943
  - Establishment of English School Broadcasts Department.
- 1944
  - The basic national network is renamed the Trans-Canada Network. The Dominion Network is formed, linking CJBC Toronto with 34 private stations to offer an alternative lighter service.
- 1945
  - Official opening of CBC International Service, later becomes Radio Canada International in 1972.
- 1946
  - Opening of first CBC FM stations in Toronto and Montreal.
  - First fishermen's broadcasts in the Maritimes.
- 1947
  - The CBC presents a 15-year plan for the development of television in Canada.
- 1948
  - First issue of the weekly program guide CBC Times.
- 1949
  - The CBC acquires the facilities and staff of the Broadcasting Corporation of Newfoundland, as the province joins the Confederation.
- 1950
  - First issue of the program guide La Semaine à Radio-Canada.
  - Special coverage of the 1950 Red River Floods
- 1951
  - Massey Commission endorses regulatory role of the CBC.
  - Special coverage of the four-week visit of Princess Elizabeth and the Duke of Edinburgh.
- 1952
  - Opening of Canadian TV service (CBC): CBFT Montreal (bilingual) September 6, CBLT Toronto (English) September 8.
  - The CBC supplies radio programs to Canadian troops in Korea.
  - First Canadian urban cable TV is launched in Guelph, Ontario.
- 1953
  - Opening of CKSO-TV in Sudbury, first private television station in Canada and first CBC TV affiliate.
  - CBFT Montreal begins full French service with opening of English station CBMT.
  - The CBC is host broadcaster for the British Empire and Commonwealth Games in Vancouver.
  - Opening of CBUT in Vancouver, first CBC TV station in Western Canada
- 1955
  - First telecast of the opening of Parliament.
  - CBC Television is available to 66% of the population.
- 1956
  - Special coverage includes the Hungarian uprising, the Suez Crisis, and the Springhill mining disaster.
- 1957
  - The Fowler Commission on Broadcasting recommends transferring regulatory authority from the CBC to a separate body.
  - Major political coverage includes the five-hour federal election telecast and the first opening of Parliament by a reigning monarch.
- 1958
  - New Broadcasting Act establishes the Board of Broadcast Governors (BBG) to regulate all Canadian broadcasting.
  - First coast-to-coast live TV broadcast with completion of the microwave network from Nova Scotia to British Columbia.
  - Opening of Calgary delay centre for western time zones.
  - CBC Northern Service (radio) is established.
  - The CBC begins broadcast of the children's program, The Friendly Giant starring Bob Homme on September 30.
- 1959
  - The microwave network is extended to Newfoundland.
  - Special programs include the opening of the St. Lawrence Seaway.
- 1960
  - BBG recommends licensing second TV stations in major cities and invites applications for Canada's first private network.
  - Opening of the CBC shortwave service to the High Arctic.
  - Experimental bilingual FM network links Toronto, Montreal and Ottawa. (Suspended temporarily in 1962)
- 1961
  - CTV Network begins broadcasting.
  - The CBC issues proposals for satellite use in Canada.
- 1962
  - The Trans-Canada and Dominion networks are consolidated.
- 1963
  - The CBC hosts the three-week Commonwealth Broadcasting Conference.
- 1964
  - The FM network resumes in English, adding Vancouver by tape; local French FM continues in Montreal.
  - CBC Corporate Headquarters now to CBC Building in Ottawa at 1500 Bronson Avenue
- 1965
  - The Fowler Committee on Broadcasting recommends a new regulatory and licensing authority.
  - Government announces colour TV policy.
  - First regular CBC stereo broadcasts from a single station in Winnipeg.
- 1966
  - Colour TV introduced in Canada.
- 1967
  - The CBC is host broadcaster for Expo 67 in Montreal and Pan American Games in Winnipeg.
  - First taped television in the North.
  - CBC children's program Mr. Dressup, starring Ernie Coombs, began broadcasting.
- 1968
  - New Broadcasting Act confirms the CBC's role of providing the national service and establishes the Canadian Radio-Television Commission (CRTC) as the regulatory and licensing authority, including cable systems. Government issues White Paper on satellite communications.
  - Pre-release facilities are installed for Atlantic time zones.
  - First televised national debate among Canadian political party leaders: a CBC/CTV coproduction.
- 1969
  - Radio-Québec is established.
  - The CBC discontinues tobacco advertising.

The iconic "gem" symbol, designed by Burton Kramer in 1974.

- 1970
  - CRTC introduces Canadian content regulations (60% overall) for public and private TV.
  - TVOntario is established.
  - The Report of the Special Senate Committee (Davey) on Mass Media is published.
  - The CRTC issues network licences to the CBC for the first time.
- 1971
  - Canadian content regulation (minimum 30%) in force for AM radio music.
  - First French-language private TV network (TVA) opens.
  - Experimental radio and TV from the Nova Scotia House of Assembly.
- 1972
  - CRTC invites proposals for future development of pay television.
  - Anik satellite launched: CBC rents three channels for radio and TV network distribution.
  - Special coverage includes Canada-Russia hockey series.
  - The CBC's International Service is renamed Radio Canada International (RCI).
- 1973
  - First live TV to the North, via Anik satellite.
  - Official opening of La Maison de Radio-Canada in Montreal.
  - Government issues a position paper entitled Proposals for a Communications Policy for Canada.
  - Access Alberta is established.
- 1974
  - Introduction of new CBC symbol based on "C" for Canada, designed by Burton Kramer.
  - Opening of French FM stereo network.
  - The CBC discontinues most radio advertisements.
  - Government announces Accelerated Coverage Plan to extend CBC radio and TV to small unserved communities.
  - Global Television Network launches.
- 1975
  - English FM stereo network opens.
  - Airing the Juno awards the first time on TV

== 1976–2026 ==
- 1976
  - CRTC becomes Canadian Radio-television and Telecommunications Commission.
  - The CBC is host broadcaster for the 1976 Summer Olympics in Montreal.
- 1977
  - CRTC hearings on pay TV.
  - The CBC designs and installs broadcast facilities in the House of Commons of Canada at Speaker's request.
- 1978
  - CRTC denies pay TV applications.
  - First TV production facilities in the North (Yellowknife).
  - The CBC is host broadcaster for Commonwealth Games in Edmonton.
- 1979
  - Clyne Committee publishes report on implications of telecommunications for Canadian sovereignty.
  - Start of live TV coverage of House of Commons via satellite and cable.

The "gem" symbol became single-colour in 1986.

- 1980s - present
  - Its believed that around the 1980s, the CBC began converting low-power, medium and high-powered transmitters from the AM band to the FM band in which the trend continues today.
- 1980
  - B.C. Knowledge is established.
- 1981
  - The CBC introduces closed captioning on Canadian TV programs.
  - The CBC is asked to manage the installation of a telecommunications system (OASIS) in Parliamentary offices.
  - Government announces a three-year CBC trial of Canadian teletext system (Telidon).
- 1982
  - The Report of the Applebaum-Hébert Committee is released.
  - Opening of Cancom to provide remote communities with additional TV services by satellite.
- 1983
  - Government creates Broadcast Program Development Fund.
  - Opening of first pay TV (general channels).
- 1984
  - CBC stereo networks start 24-hour broadcasting and supplementary cable distribution.
  - The CBC is host broadcaster for the 12-day papal visit.
  - First pay TV specialty channels open.
  - Federal-provincial committee publishes report on future of French-language TV in Canada.
  - The CBC and other broadcasters join TV5, a European French-language satellite service.
- 1986
  - Federal Task Force on Program Review (Nielsen) publishes recommendations on culture and communications.
  - Opening of 2nd private French TV channel (Quatre Saisons) in Montreal.
  - The Federal Task Force on Broadcasting Policy (Caplan/Sauvageau) publishes its recommendations.
  - A commemorative postage stamp is issued for the CBC's 50th anniversary.
- 1987
  - The CRTC licences 10 new specialty channels: nine on basic cable at the option of cable distributors (CBC All-News Channel (CBC Newsworld), Vision TV, YTV, MeteoMedia: Weather Now, TV5, Le Canal Famille, Musique Plus, Le Réseau des sports, MétéoMedia: Mété-Instant), and one pay TV service (Family).
  - The CRTC also authorizes distribution of The Sports Network (TSN) and MuchMusic on basic cable.
- 1988
  - The CBC Broadcast Centre Development Project in Toronto gets Cabinet approval in April, and work starts in October.
  - The International French-language channel TV5 starts broadcasting in Canada in September.
  - Cabinet approves CBC licence to operate an English all-news channel.
- 1989
  - The CBC English all-news channel, Newsworld, is launched on July 31.
  - The CRTC holds hearings to consider CBC's application for an all-news channel in French. This first proposal is rejected.
  - The French private channel Le Réseau des Sports goes on air September 1.

The current simplified "gem" symbol from 1992.

- 1990
  - The CBC publishes its vision for the future in a document entitled Mission, Values, Goals and Objectives.
  - CBC Engineering plays a proactive role in the development of Digital Audio Broadcasting.
  - The CBC closes eleven regional stations as a result of budget cuts.
- 1991
  - CBC Toronto consolidates its operations into one downtown location, the new state-of-the-art Canadian Broadcasting Centre.
  - Bill C-40 on broadcasting receives royal assent on February 1 and is proclaimed Law on June 4.
- 1992
  - The CBC develops a new identification program.
  - The CBC introduced a simplified version of the iconic gem symbol, designed by Gottschalk + Ash.
- 1994
  - The CBC is host to the Commonwealth Games in Victoria.
  - The CBC, in partnership with Power Broadcasting Inc., launches two new specialty channels to the United States: Trio and Newsworld International.
- 1995
  - The CBC's French language all-news channel, Réseau de l'information (RDI), is launched on January 1.
  - The CBC establishes its web presence at CBC.ca and at Radio-Canada.ca.
  - The CBC is granted a licence to operate a new digital audio music service called Galaxie.
- 1996
  - CBC TV boasts an all-Canadian prime-time schedule.
  - The House of Commons Standing Committee on Canadian Heritage presents its report on the future of the CBC in a multi-channel universe.
- 1997
  - The CRTC approves the CBC's applications to transfer CBF (French) and CBM (English) in Montreal, CBV (French) in Quebec City and CBL (English) in Toronto from the AM to the FM band.
  - The English Information Radio service is rebranded Radio One and the stereo music service, Radio Two. French Radio services are now called Première Chaîne and Chaîne culturelle.
  - Galaxie, the first pay, satellite and cable delivered audio service, is launched.
  - The CBC files applications for six new specialty services: Le Réseau des Arts, Le Réseau de l'économie, Le Réseau de l'histoire, Land & Sea, Télé classique and The People Channel.
- 1998
  - The International Olympic Committee awards the CBC, in partnership with NetStar, broadcast rights to the next five Olympic Games.
  - The CBC makes a presentation to the CRTC's review of television policy in Canada, the first such review in 17 years.
  - On September 28, CBC Radio opens a station in Victoria, the last provincial capital to get a CBC Radio station.
  - The CRTC opens competition in the satellite delivery of radio and television services by giving Shaw Direct a licence.
- 1999
  - Roughly 1,800 technicians go on strike over wages and job security.
  - The CRTC holds public consultation sessions in 11 cities to find out what Canadians think about the CBC, its role, its programming and its direction.
  - The CBC is the host broadcaster for the Pan Am Games in Winnipeg.

The current simplified "gem" symbol from 1992.

- 2000
  - The Y2K project team ensures that CBC/Radio-Canada does not experience technological problems on January 1.
  - CBC/Radio-Canada and Corus Entertainment Inc. partner on a new digital music service.
  - Radio de Radio-Canada opens a new station in Abitibi-Témiscamingue.
  - Newsworld International and Trio are sold to USA Networks
  - CBC Radio 3 launches three websites geared to new music and youth culture: 120seconds.com, newmusiccanada.com and justconcerts.com.
  - The Nature of Things celebrates 40 years on CBC television.
- 2001
  - Three specialty services are launched in partnership with the private sector: ARTV, The Documentary Channel and Country Canada.
  - The Centre de l'information in Montreal, a state-of-the-art facility for gathering and producing news for Télévision de Radio-Canada and RDI, is opened.
- 2002
  - CBC/Radio-Canada celebrates the 50th anniversary of public television in Canada with various events, including a historic visit by Queen Elizabeth II to the Canadian Broadcasting Centre in Toronto and, in partnership with Via Rail, a special anniversary train travelling across the country.
  - All analogue distribution services are now converted to digital technology.
  - Country Canada becomes wholly owned by CBC/Radio-Canada and changes its name to CBC Country Canada.
  - Hockey Night in Canada and La Soirée du hockey launch their 50th season on CBC Television et la Télévision de Radio-Canada.
- 2003
  - State-of-the-art broadcast centres open in downtown Edmonton and Quebec City.
  - CBC/Radio-Canada is named one of Canada's Top 100 Employers for 2004.
  - As It Happens celebrates 35 years on CBC Radio.
- 2004
  - Ottawa operations move to the new state-of-the-art CBC Ottawa Broadcast Centre.
  - The Prairie Aboriginal Content Unit is created to develop First Nations storytelling content for both Radio and Television.
  - The Chaîne culturelle, Radio de Radio-Canada's music channel, is re-launched as Espace musique.
  - Radio Canada International adds a ninth language, Portuguese for Brazilians, to its line-up.
- 2005
  - Radio Canada International celebrates its 60th anniversary.
  - The CRTC approves SIRIUS Canada's satellite radio application, a partnership between CBC/Radio-Canada, Standard Radio Inc., and SIRIUS Satellite Radio. SIRIUS Canada's 100-channel line-up is announced, featuring six from CBC/Radio-Canada.
  - CBC Radio 3 celebrates millionth podcast download.
  - Télévision de Radio-Canada and CBC Television jointly aired an important documentary on the 1995 Quebec referendum called Point Break/Point de Rupture.
- 2006
  - CBC/Radio-Canada is the host broadcaster of the XVI International AIDS Conference, which is held in Toronto.
  - HDTV service launches in Quebec City and Vancouver.
  - The daily program Virginie, which has run on Télévision de Radio-Canada since 1996, broke the record for most episodes ever produced as part of a French-language television drama series: 1221.
  - Radio de Radio-Canada's Première Chaîne marked Jacques Languirand's 35th year on air by treating listeners to a major documentary on this legendary communicator, man of the theatre, and host of the program Par 4 chemins.
- 2007
  - Bernard Derome hosted his 22nd election night special on Télévision de Radio-Canada; since 1972, he has anchored 11 federal elections, eight provincial elections and three referendums.
  - Jacques Bertrand and the entire Macadam tribus team celebrated the 10th anniversary of this offbeat radio program on Première Chaîne that mixes humour and serious discussion, reality and fiction, rap and electronica, animal life and the human condition, as well as News and views.
  - 3.7 million: Viewership to the first episode of CBC Television's Little Mosque on the Prairie.
  - 300,000: Number of subscribers to Sirius Canada Satellite Radio as of January 1, 2007 (six of Sirius Canada's 11 Canadian channels are provided by CBC/Radio-Canada).
  - CBC Records brings home two Juno awards in the Classical music category.
  - CBC Television captures the first ever television Broadcaster of the Year Award at the prestigious New York Festivals.
- 2009
  - The CBC cuts 800 jobs

The current simplified "gem" symbol from 1992.

- 2010
  - The CBC kicks off one year to its 75th anniversary
- 2011
  - CBC/Radio-Canada celebrates its 75th anniversary.
- 2012
  - The CBC cuts $115 million from its budget
  - bold was sold to Blue Ant Media
- 2013
  - The CBC sold the rights of Hockey Night in Canada to Rogers Communications, with Rogers sublicencing NHL games to the CBC
- 2014
  - The CBC cuts 657 jobs and cuts $130 million from its budget
- 2026
  - Rogers Communications opts to not sublicense NHL games to the CBC at the start of their new contract, ending Hockey Night in Canada in its original form as well as CBC's NHL broadcasts
  - The CBC becomes a full member of the European Broadcasting Union, the first full member in North America, and announces plans to compete in the Eurovision Song Contest in 2027

== See also ==
- Oldest television station
