= 1923 in radio =

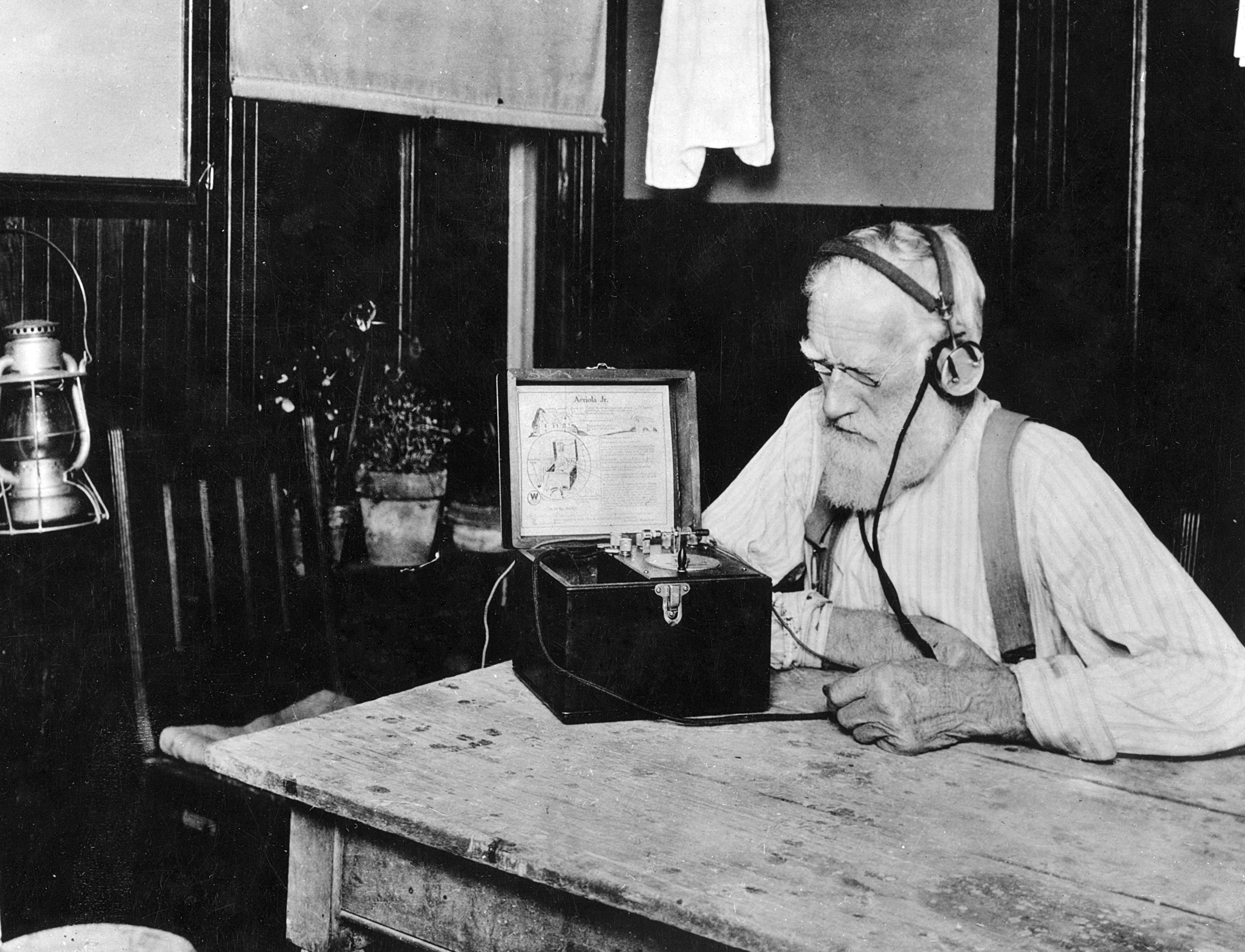

1923 in radio details the internationally significant events in radio broadcasting for the year 1923.

== Events ==
- 1 January – In the United States the American football Rose Bowl Game is broadcast for the first time, on Los Angeles station KHJ.
- 4 January – The first network broadcast is made when WEAF in New York City and WNAC in Boston simultaneously broadcast a saxophone solo.
- 8 January – First outside broadcast by the British Broadcasting Company: a British National Opera Company production of The Magic Flute from the Royal Opera House, Covent Garden.
- 18 January – The United Kingdom Postmaster General grants the BBC a licence to broadcast.
- 20 January – Inauguration of Paris PTT, a station organized by and broadcasting from the École supérieure des postes et télégraphes (the French post office's higher educational institute of engineering).
- 8 February – Norman Albert calls the first live broadcast of an ice hockey game, the third period of an Ontario Hockey League Intermediate playoff game, on Toronto radio station CFCA.
- 13 March – Production of the first radio set incorporating a loudspeaker. All previously produced sets have required the use of headphones.
- 14 March – Pete Parker calls the play-by-play of the first ice hockey game ever broadcast on the radio in its entirety, between the Regina Capitals and the Edmonton Eskimos of the Western Canada Hockey League.
- 1 April – In Vienna the Czeija & Nissl electrical company begins test transmissions from its premises in co-operation with a technical high school, the Technisches Gewerbemusem. This marks the start of radio broadcasting in Austria.
- 18 May – The first regular radio broadcasts begin in Czechoslovakia.
- 1 June – The publicly owned Canadian National Railways establishes the CNR Radio network to supply programming on its fleet of passenger cars; it is the first national network in North America and precursor to the Canadian Broadcasting Corporation.
- 21 July – The Dutch radio manufacturing company Nederlandsche Seintoestellen Fabriek begins regular radio broadcasting in the Netherlands.
- 28 September – First publication of the BBC listings magazine, Radio Times, in Britain.
- 29 October – Regular radio broadcasting in Germany officially begins with the first evening transmission from the Sendestelle Berlin installed at the Vox-Haus in Potsdamer Platz.
- 8 November – First BBC broadcast in Welsh
- 23 November
  - Australia's first licensed radio station, 2SB, begins transmission in Sydney.
  - In Belgium, French-speaking station Radio Bruxelles begins broadcasting (it will change its name to Radio Belgique on 1 January 1924).
- 2 December – First BBC broadcast in Gaelic
- 31 December
  - KDKA in Pittsburgh conducts the first transcontinental voice broadcast with a station in Manchester, England.
  - The BBC broadcasts the chimes of Big Ben from London for the first time.

== Debuts ==
- 22 March – Hockey Night in Canada is first broadcast on the Toronto Star's private station CFCA.

== Births ==
- 26 January – Patricia Hughes, English continuity announcer (died 2013)
- 2 March – Jean Metcalfe, English radio broadcaster (died 2000)
- 9 May – Johnny Grant, American radio host and producer (died 2008)
- 10 October – Nicholas Parsons, British entertainer (died 2020)
- 21 November – Margaret Lyons, born Keiko Margaret Inouye, Canadian broadcast executive (died 2019)
- 22 December – John Ebdon, British radio broadcaster, Graecophile, author and director of the London Planetarium (died 2005)
- 25 December – Gordon Baxter, American radio personality, author and columnist (died 2005)
