= John Aird (banker) =

Canadian banker

Sir John Aird
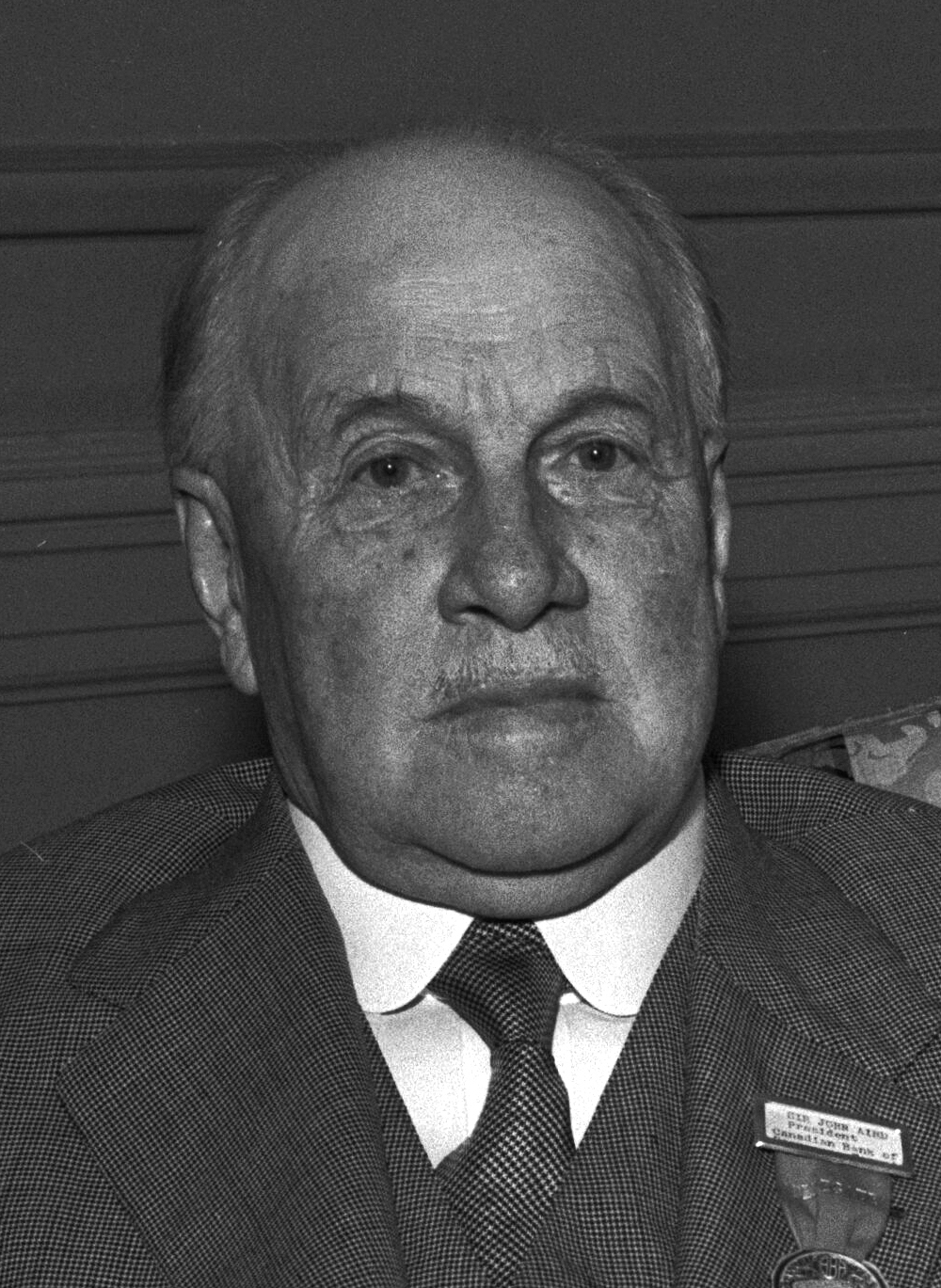
- Aird in the late 1930s
- Born: November 15, 1855; Longueuil, Canada East
- Died: November 30, 1938 (aged 83); Toronto, Ontario, Canada
- Occupation: Banker
- Employer: Canadian Bank of Commerce
- Relatives: John Black Aird (grandson)

Sir John Aird (November 15, 1855 – November 30, 1938) was a Canadian banker. Born at Longueuil in Canada East (now Quebec), he joined the Canadian Bank of Commerce in 1878. He became president of the bank in 1924 and held that position until 1929.

== Aird Commission ==
A number of problems arose during 1920s, causing debates on how broadcasting should be managed. These problems included the feeling that religious radio stations had "...emerged as a new weapon with which one religious group could bludgeon another...", and that U.S. stations unfairly dominated the airwaves despite an agreement to reserve some frequencies exclusively for Canadian stations. These led the government of William Lyon Mackenzie King to establish a Royal Commission on the subject of broadcasting. Aird was appointed head of the three-man commission which also included Augustin Frigon, an electrical engineer, and Charles Bowman, editor of the Ottawa Citizen.

In 1929, the Aird Commission delivered its nine-page Report of the Royal Commission on Radio Broadcasting to Parliament. Included in the report was the recommendation that broadcasting in Canada should benefit the people of the country. To this end, the report recommended a publicly owned system funded in part by a $3 annual licence fee, in essence, the blueprint for the Canadian Broadcasting Corporation. Unfortunately, the stock market crashed a scant six weeks after the report was issued, making government support for public broadcasting problematic. Eventually, however, under the government of R. B. Bennett, the Canadian Radio Broadcasting Commission was formed in 1932 under the chairmanship of Hector Charlesworth, a journalist and music critic from Saturday Night magazine.

Aird died in Toronto in 1938. His grandson John Black Aird was a Canadian lawyer who served as the 23rd Lieutenant Governor of Ontario from 1980 to 1985.
