= Ice hockey broadcasting =

Broadcast of Ice Hockey on Radio and Television

As with most other professional sports, ice hockey is broadcast both on radio and television.

== History ==
The first dissemination of game scores via electronic means was done by telegraph, starting in the 1890s. In Montreal's Victoria Rink, telegraph lines were installed to send game descriptions to operators in Winnipeg for the 1896 Stanley Cup challenge between Montreal and Winnipeg.

On February 8, 1923 the first radio broadcast of an ice hockey game was made. Toronto Daily Star reporter Norman Albert described the third-period action of a game between Midland and North Toronto at Toronto's Arena Gardens. The radio station was CFCA, owned by the newspaper. The station also carried the first NHL radio broadcast on February 14, 1923, with the broadcast of the third-period of a game between the Toronto St. Patricks and the Ottawa Senators at the same arena.

The first complete hockey game carried over the radio was on February 22, 1923 on CJCG out of Winnipeg of a game between the Winnipeg Falcons and the Port Arthur Bearcats. The first complete broadcast of a professional game was made on March 14, 1923 on CKCK out of Regina, Saskatchewan and reported by Pete Parker. The game was not an NHL contest, but rather a Western Canada Hockey League featuring the Regina Capitals. The first hockey game televised in Canada was on October 11, 1952 of a game between the Montreal Canadiens and the Detroit Red Wings, played at the Montreal Forum, a few weeks after television arrived in Canada. However, the 1952 Memorial Cup finals, taking place several months before the inauguration of TV broadcasting in Canada, were televised on a closed-circuit basis to CBC Television's offices, using equipment leased from NBC in New York. Foster Hewitt was play-by-play commentator for the test run, so network and ad executives could see how well hockey could be televised.

As in other sports, television has had a major effect on hockey. The infusion of money has made the major leagues far more professional with vastly higher salaries for players. It has also changed the game as NHL rules now mandate three commercial breaks per period, giving players time to recuperate and allowing the better players to be on the ice longer. However, it also lengthens and slows the games considerably.

Games today are also broadcast over the Internet. The NHL website allows fans to listen to online broadcasts of every NHL game.

=== Asia ===
Yes TV's All Sports Network signed a multi-year deal with the NHL to broadcast over 130 regular season games, beginning in the 2008–09 NHL season to broadcast NHL All-Star games, Stanley Cup playoffs and Stanley Cup Finals, as well as NHL highlight programs.

=== Canada ===
In Canada, NHL hockey is broadcast every Saturday night on CBC's longest-running television show, Hockey Night in Canada. During the week, other games are shown on cable channels TSN and RDS. Various local channels carry other games as well. During the NHL playoffs, CBC carries four of the Conference Quarterfinals (first, second, fourth, and sixth choice), two of the Conference semifinals (first and third choice), all games of one conference final and games 4-7 of the other (or all games if involving a Canadian team). TSN gets the remainder.

CBC also carries many international tournaments, such as the World Cup of Hockey. The Winter Olympics in 1998, 2002 and 2006 were on CBC, but the 2010 games were on CTV and RDS. Major games like those of the 1972 Summit Series or the 2002 Winter Olympics have received some of the highest ratings in Canadian television history. Other well-known tournaments, like the Spengler Cup or the Memorial Cup, are carried on Rogers Sportsnet. TSN and RDS carry all IIHF events, such as the World Junior Championships and World Championships.

Several Canadian Hockey League (CHL; the umbrella organization for Canada's junior hockey leagues) and American Hockey League (AHL) games are broadcast by local channels in Canada, as is the occasional university game.

Hockey Night in Canada, or HNIC, is considerably CBC's most profitable show and supports many of the corporation's other ventures.

=== United States ===
According to Foster Hewitt's book His Own Story the first TV hockey broadcasts occurred in the late 1940s in New York and Detroit as Foster was interviewed as a hockey guest in both cities. Hockey hasn't traditionally fared as well on American television compared to the NBA, MLB, or the NFL. In fact, hockey broadcasting on a national scale was spotty prior to 1981; NBC and CBS held rights at various times, but neither network carried anything close to a full schedule, even carrying only selected games of the Stanley Cup Finals. From 1971 to 1995, there was no exclusive coverage of games in the United States.

In 1981, the fledgling USA Network (formerly MSG Network) carried 35 regular-season games a year and a full schedule of playoff games through 1985, supplanted by ESPN in 1985 and SportsChannel in 1989. ESPN regained the national hockey contract in 1993, joined by the Fox network in 1995.

Fox had put much effort into trying to stimulate American interests in the game, but had achieved little success. One of their schemes was to make the hockey puck more visible by highlighting it on television with a blue comet, using FoxTrax. When a slapshot over 70 miles per hour was made, the puck would leave a red comet trail on the television. This idea was met with great derision in Canada, especially to diehard hockey fans, and also met with little success in the United States, often ridiculed by comedians on both sides of the border.

Fox got out of the hockey business in 1999 after being massively outbid - surprisingly, given Fox's low ratings - by ESPN's fellow Disney network ABC. This $600 million contract was signed in 1998 and was regarded as a failure.

Before the 2004–05 lockout, the NHL had reached two separate deals with NBC and ESPN. The NBC deal stipulated that the network would pay the league no rights fees - an unheard of practice to that point. NBC's deal included six regular season windows, seven postseason broadcasts and games 3–7 of the Stanley Cup Finals in primetime. The contracts were to commence when the lockout ended. The NBC deal was to expire after the 2006–07 season, but NBC picked up the option to renew for the 2007–08 season (Just like the AFL/NBC agreement, which the network did not renew in 2006). The NHL and NBC share in revenues from advertising.

ESPN had a two-year deal that they opted out of after the lockout, leaving the NHL without a cable partner. In August 2005, Comcast (who owns the Philadelphia Flyers) paid $70 million a year for three years to put games on the OLN network, now known as Versus. Versus is now known as the NBC Sports Network. Due to the abbreviated off-season, the 2005–06 schedule did not offer OLN exclusivity, which they received in 2006–07. NBC Sports Network will also cover the playoffs and will exclusively air Games 1 and 2 of the Stanley Cup Finals.

On March 10, 2021, ESPN and Turner Sports agreed to seven-year deals to air NHL games, including airing NHL games on ABC, where for the first time, will air the Stanley Cup Finals matches in its entirely, although this only occurs during even-numbered years, while Turner Sports will also the Stanley Cup Finals during odd-numbered years. ESPN will also air up to 75 games

The NHL's American television popularity has been increasing since the debut of the NHL Winter Classic in 2008; the Winter Classic has earned Nielsen ratings on par with those the league had in 1975, when there were far fewer channels and much less audience fracturing.

Minor league hockey has more limited national coverage; the America One network currently holds broadcast rights to select games in the American Hockey League and the ECHL, the two top minor leagues in North America.

Individual teams (both major and minor, though far more common in the major leagues) have long contracted to air their games on local channels, primarily on Regional sports networks and in a few cases on broadcast channels as well.

Collegiate hockey's television coverage has expanded in the late 2000s, with national networks CSTV, and ESPNU carrying numerous regular-season contests. ESPNU airs the NCAA's Division I men's tournament (with the semifinals airing on ESPN2 and the final game on ESPN), and CSTV carries games from other levels' tournaments. Regular-season games can also be found on specialty channels Big Ten Network and Fox College Sports, along with Midwest regional sports networks FSN North, FSN Wisconsin, and FSN Detroit.

=== Europe ===
In 2004, the NHL announced that games would be broadcast across the European continent on the ESPN America as part of a four-year deal that would also include live streaming of games across the Internet. The league previously had agreements with the Galaxie network of the Czech Republic and NTV's TV7 channel in Russia.
