= The Northern Messenger =

Canadian Arctic radio program

The Northern Messenger was a weekly radio program broadcast to the Canadian Arctic and other remote parts of northern Canada. The program read personal messages over the air to listeners in isolated communities, outposts, missions, police detachments and trading posts. It functioned as a practical communications service for people who could not reliably be reached by ordinary mail during the winter months, and who lived in areas where long-distance telephone service was unavailable or limited.

The service originated in the 1920s as a Westinghouse shortwave broadcast from KDKA in Pittsburgh. A Canadian-produced version, known initially as the Canadian Northern Messenger, was later created by the Canadian Radio Broadcasting Commission (CRBC) and continued by the Canadian Broadcasting Corporation (CBC). The CBC version became one of the best-known early examples of radio broadcasting as a social and public-service link between southern Canada and the North.

== History ==
=== Origins at KDKA ===
The original Northern Messenger was produced by KDKA and broadcast on its shortwave radio simulcaster, 8XS, later known as W8XK and WPIT. Its intended audience was Royal Canadian Mounted Police officers and other southerners stationed in the Canadian Arctic, who used the broadcasts to remain in touch with events and family news from outside the region.

KDKA was owned and operated by Westinghouse Electric Corporation. The suggestion for a special northern broadcast came from Canadian Westinghouse, which had been involved in supplying receivers to northern outposts. The program consisted of messages from listeners to their friends and family living in the Far North, recorded music, and news. It was broadcast weekly during the winter season, generally from November to May, when normal mail delivery was unavailable or highly irregular.

KDKA's Northern Messenger and associated "Far Northern Service" broadcasts operated from the 1920s until 1940. In later years, the American broadcasts also carried or complemented the Canadian-produced version of the program.

=== Canadian Northern Messenger ===
After the Canadian Radio Broadcasting Commission was created in 1932, it developed its own version of the service, initially under the name Canadian Northern Messenger. The regular Canadian program began in December 1933 and was broadcast over the CRBC's network of mediumwave stations and Canadian shortwave stations.

Like the KDKA program, the Canadian version carried personal messages from friends and family to people living or working in northern communities, including RCMP officers, missionaries, trappers, doctors, nurses, scientists, traders, Cree listeners and Inuit listeners. The messages were read over the air because many intended recipients could not be reached quickly by mail. The program also included recorded music, news, weather and other information intended for northern listeners.

The program was initially produced by CRCT in Toronto and carried on the CRBC network, including the shortwave stations CRCX at Bowmanville, Ontario, CJRO and CJRX at Winnipeg, and VE9DN at Drummondville, Quebec. These shortwave stations continued to carry the program during the 1930s, giving it a reach beyond the ordinary coverage of southern mediumwave stations.

When the Canadian Broadcasting Corporation was formed in 1936 as the successor to the CRBC, the program was continued by CBC Radio. During its first year, Canadian Northern Messenger relayed 1,754 messages; within four years, the number of messages handled had increased approximately sixfold.

=== Format and audience ===
The Northern Messenger was sometimes described as a radio "mailbag" program. Listeners in the south sent messages to the broadcaster, which selected and read them on air for people in northern settlements and outposts. The messages included family news, holiday greetings, updates from children attending school or receiving medical treatment in the south, and other personal notices.

Because reception conditions could vary and listeners might not be able to hear every broadcast, the program relied on repetition and seasonal scheduling. Broadcasts were concentrated in the winter months, when travel, shipping and postal delivery were most difficult. The program's audience included both non-Indigenous workers posted to the North and Indigenous residents of northern communities. Scholars of northern broadcasting have noted that the program reflected an early use of radio as a public service in the North, although it was produced in southern Canada and largely controlled by southern broadcasting institutions.

=== CBC production and distribution ===
CBC produced the program from different cities over its history. It was produced from CBO in Ottawa in the 1930s, from CBC's Winnipeg studios in the 1950s and early 1960s, and from Montreal beginning in the mid-1960s.

By the 1940s and 1950s, the program was recorded and broadcast over western CBC stations including CBW in Winnipeg, CBX in Edmonton, and CBK in Saskatchewan. It was also carried through the Northwest Territories and Yukon Radio System, reaching listeners in the Yukon and Northwest Territories.

A later rebroadcast reached Labrador, northern Quebec and the eastern Arctic through CBC shortwave facilities, including the powerful Sackville Relay Station in New Brunswick.

=== Later years and legacy ===
The program continued after the formal creation of the CBC Northern Service in the late 1950s. In 1960, CBC began a Northern Short Wave Service using facilities at Sackville, New Brunswick, and the Northern Service continued to feature The Northern Messenger as a mailbag program for communities where ordinary mail and telephone service remained limited.

In the 1960s, the program's focus increasingly shifted toward northern communities themselves. A 1965 report in The Gazette described CBC's plans to expand northern message programming from Montreal, and later accounts describe the service as part of the broader CBC Northern Service. The program was still remembered in northern communities as a familiar link with relatives, students, patients and workers who were away from home.

The program declined as northern communications improved. Expanding telephone networks, more regular air service, improved postal delivery, local radio production, satellite communications and Indigenous-language broadcasting reduced the need for a centrally produced radio message service. Its role was partly superseded by the development of CBC North and by local and regional northern broadcasting services.

== See also ==
- CBC North
- Radio Canada International
- Shortwave radio
- Northwest Territories and Yukon Radio System
