= Graham Spry =

Canadian broadcaster and diplomat (1900–1983)

Graham Spry CC
- Born: February 20, 1900; St. Thomas, Ontario, Canada
- Died: November 24, 1983 (aged 83); Ottawa, Ontario, Canada
- Education: University of Manitoba; University College, Oxford
- Spouse: Irene Spry (m. 1938)
- Children: Robin Spry; Richard Spry; Lib Spry

Graham Spry CC (1900–1983) was a Canadian broadcasting pioneer, business executive, diplomat and socialist. He was the husband of Irene Spry and father of Robin Spry, Richard Spry and Lib Spry.

== Life ==
He was born on February 20, 1900, in St. Thomas, Ontario. While a student at the University of Manitoba, he became an editorial writer at the Manitoba Free Press, where he was mentored by editor and Canadian nationalist John W. Dafoe. He also edited the student newspaper, The Manitoban. He then studied history at Oxford University as a Rhodes Scholar. Upon his return to Canada, he became Secretary of the Canadian Clubs, and organized a nationwide broadcast to celebrate the fiftieth anniversary of Canadian Confederation. The accomplishment, achieved despite the lack of a national radio network, convinced Prime Minister William Lyon Mackenzie King to appoint the Aird Commission on Radio Broadcasting, a royal commission which recommended the creation of a national broadcaster.

Following the defeat of King's government Spry and Alan Plaunt formed the Canadian Radio League to rally support behind the Aird Commission's recommendation, arguing that it amounted to a choice between two alternatives, "the State or the United States". The league mobilized public opinion in both English- and French-speaking regions of Canada, and convinced the Conservative government of R. B. Bennett to form the Canadian Radio Broadcasting Commission, which later became the Canadian Broadcasting Corporation.

A socialist, Spry cofounded the League for Social Reconstruction (LSR), contributed to the writing of the Regina Manifesto, and purchased both the Farmer's Sun (publication of the United Farmers of Ontario), renamed the New Commonwealth, and the Canadian Forum to propagate the LSR's views. He served as vice president of the Ontario Co-operative Commonwealth Federation (CCF) from 1934 to 1936. He was the first national Co-operative Commonwealth Federation candidate in Ontario, running in the 24 September 1934 by-election in Toronto East. He ran again for the national CCF in the 1935 general election, this time in the newly created Broadview electoral district. He lost on both occasions to Conservative Tommy Church.

During the Spanish Civil War Spry helped organize medical support for the Mackenzie-Papineau Battalion that fought on the Republican side.

In 1938, Spry married Irene Mary Biss. Unable to find work in Canada because of his socialist convictions, however, Spry accepted a job offer from an old Oxford friend and served as a British-based executive for Standard Oil from 1940 to 1946, managing subsidiaries operating in the Middle East and elsewhere. From 1942 to 1945, he also served as personal assistant to Sir Stafford Cripps, a Labour minister in the wartime British cabinet, and travelled with Cripps to India. After the war, Spry was named agent-general of Tommy Douglas's CCF government in London representing the province of Saskatchewan from 1946 to 1968 in Britain, including responsibility for Europe and the Middle East.

Spry played a crucial role during the 1962 Saskatchewan doctors' strike against Medicare by recruiting British doctors to move to the province. In 1968 he reactivated his involvement with broadcasting, founding the Canadian Broadcasting League over which he presided until 1973. In 1970, Spry reputedly turned down Prime Minister Pierre Trudeau's offer of a Senate seat. That same year, he was made a Companion of the Order of Canada. Graham Spry died in Ottawa on November 24, 1983.

== Building ==
A federal government building dedicated in the name of Graham Spry is located at 250 Lanark Avenue, Ottawa. Formerly the home of the Canadian Broadcasting Corporation's Ottawa television studios, it now houses several directorates of Health Canada.

== Sources ==
- Babe, Robert. (2000) "Graham Spry" in Canadian Communications Thought: Ten Foundational Writers. Toronto: University of Toronto Press. ISBN 0-8020-7949-0.
- McChesney, Robert W. (1999) "Graham Spry and the Future of Canadian Broadcasting", Canadian Journal of Communication 24(1).
