= Mary Broad =

British entrepreneur and Bournemouth headmistress

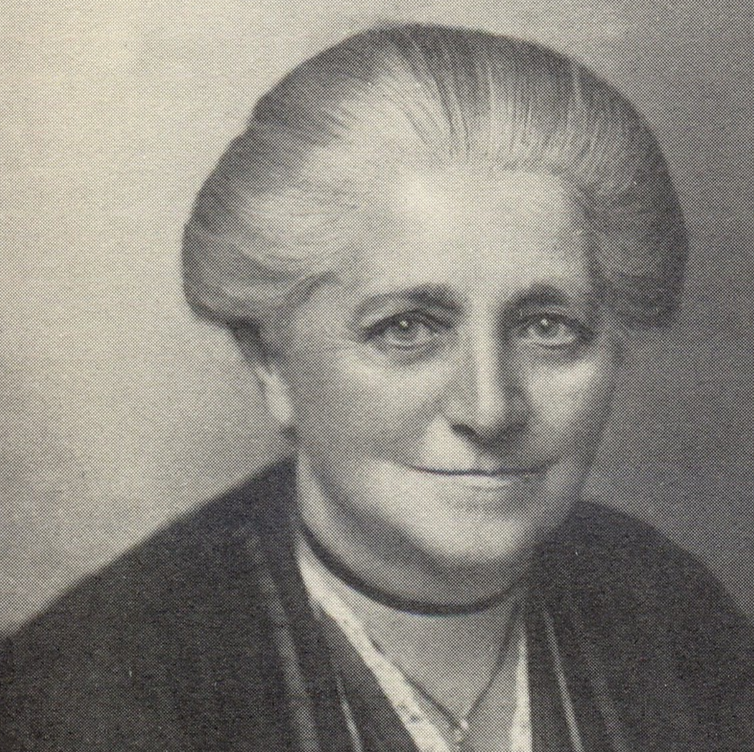
- in 1922
- Born: Mary Aylett Broad; 13 December 1860; Kennington, London, England
- Died: 13 July 1942 (aged 81); Warrington, England
- Education: Wandsworth high school
- Occupation: teacher
- Known for: founding Bournemouth High School now known as Talbot Heath School
- Successor: Cicely Frideswide Stocks

Mary Aylett Broad (13 December 1860 – 13 July 1942) was a British entrepreneur and Bournemouth headmistress. She founded Bournemouth High School for girls now known as Talbot Heath School.

== Life ==
Broad was born in Kennington in 1860. Her mother was Sarah Ann (née West) and Arthur Broad. She was the first of their twelve children of whom seven survived. Her father was a mercantile clerk.

Broad and Miss Thresher went to the Bournemouth area with the intention of finding a school. They bought one from its owner in 1885. The school opened under new management in January 1886 with thirty pupils. The school was called Bournemouth High School and it intended to supply a liberal education for reasonable fees to the daughters of the middle classes. Broad converted from a non-conformist to the Church of England at this time. Miss Thresher left in 1889 when she married and Mary Broad was left solely in charge.

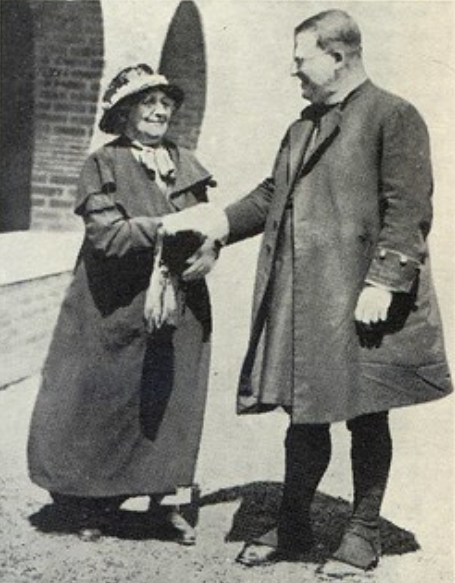
Mary Broad with the Archbishop of York in 1935

Broad was known for doing what she thought was right ignoring criticism and tradition. Her pupils were taken on nature walks, they played hockey and cricket and they were taken on trips abroad. Broad took advice from Frances Buss who had created the North London Collegiate School in 1850. Broad hoped that her school could be as successful. Buss told her to not appoint a board of governors as they would hold back plans for new buildings. She eventually ignored this advice as she was not feeling well in 1898. She made a substantial endowment of the school and she gained management assistance. Students at her school under her headship included the sculptor Helen Margaret George and the writer and film critic Dilys Powell. As Buss predicted there were no new substantive school buildings for twenty years. Broad retired in 1924 and her place was taken by Cicely Frideswide Stocks. In 1935 "Talbot Heath School" was moved to new buildings. There was a new hall and gym and within the first few months it was opened by Dr William Temple who was then the Archbishop of York. Margaret Broad was in attendance together with other invited guests including the Mayor and the Bishop and the Archdeacon of Winchester.

Broad died in 1942 in Warrington.
