= Frigon =

French surname

Frigon is a surname of French origin. Notable people with the name include:

- Augustin Frigon (1888–1952), Canadian engineer and administrator
- Joseph-Auguste Frigon (1870–1944), Canadian politician
- Louis Frigon (born 1948), Canadian ice hockey player
- Miranda Frigon (born 1980), Canadian actor and songwriter
