= Timeline of strikes in 1999 =

Strikes in 1999

In 1999, a number of labour strikes, labour disputes, and other industrial actions occurred.

== Background ==
A labour strike is a work stoppage caused by the mass refusal of employees to work. This can include wildcat strikes, which are done without union authorisation, and slowdown strikes, where workers reduce their productivity while still carrying out minimal working duties. It is usually a response to employee grievances, such as low pay or poor working conditions. Strikes can also occur to demonstrate solidarity with workers in other workplaces or pressure governments to change policies.

== Timeline ==
=== Continuing strikes from 1998 ===
- 1998–99 ABC lockout, 11-week lockout of American Broadcasting Company technicians following a 1-day strike.
- 1998–2000 Kaiser Aluminum strike, 2-year strike by Kaiser Aluminum metalworkers in the United States.
- 1998–99 Russian teachers' strikes, strikes by teachers in the Russian Federation over unpaid wages.
- 1998–99 Samsung strike, in South Korea, over a deal in which Samsung would transfer its auto division to Daewoo in exchange for Daewoo's electronics division.

=== January ===
- 1999 Cambodian teachers' strike

=== February ===
- 1999 CBC strike, 7-week strike by Canadian Broadcasting Corporation technicians in Canada.
- 1999 Finnish air traffic controllers' strike, 5-week strike by air traffic controllers in Finland over wages.
- 1999 UNAM strike, student strike against tuition increases.

=== March ===
- 1999 Iberia strike, strike by Iberia pilots in Spain.
- 1999 Israeli ports' strike, 10-day strike by dockworkers in Israel.
- 1999 Portuguese trawlers' strike, strike by fishing trawlers in Portugal over wages.

=== April ===
- 1999 Basilica of the Annunciation dispute, dispute between the Christian and Muslim communities of Nazareth over plans to build a plaza near the Basilica of the Annunciation, including a general strike.
- 1999 Mayora strike, 2-month strike by Mayora Indah workers in Tangerang, Indonesia.
- 1999 Peruvian general strike, general strike in Peru against the government of Alberto Fujimori.

=== May ===
- 1999 French cultural workers' strike, 21-day strike by Ministry of Culture workers in France.
- 1999 San Francisco Bay carpenters' strike, wildcat strike by carpenters in the San Francisco Bay Area.

=== June ===
- 1999 Danish midwives' strike, 4-week strike by midwives in Denmark.
- 1999 Sri Lankan doctors' strike

=== July ===
- 1999 Argentinian truckers' strike
- 1999 Brazilian truckers' strike

=== August ===
- 1999 Aceh general strike, 2-day general strike in Aceh against Indonesian National Armed Forces violence.
- 1999 Detroit teachers' strike
- 1999 Ecuador transport strike

=== September ===
- 1999 Atlantic City casinos strike
- 1999 Ford Dagenham strike, strike by autoworkers at a Ford of Britain plant in Dagenham.
- 1999 Toronto Symphony strike, 11-week strike by Toronto Symphony Orchestra musicians over wage cuts.

=== October ===
- 1999 Indian truckers' strike
- 1999 Irish nurses' strike, organised by the Irish Nurses and Midwives Organisation.
- Israeli Disability Strike of 1999, 37-day strike by people with disabilities in Israel for disability rights.

=== November ===
- Cochabamba Water War, including strikes, against privatisation of the municipal water supply of Cochabamba, Bolivia.
- 1999–2000 El Salvadoran healthcare strike, against privatisation.

== List of lockouts in 1999 ==
- 1998–99 NBA lockout

== Changes in legislation ==
In March, the Italian government announced a bill to extend regulations on public sector strikes to include workers who affected the functionality of public services.

In December, the Swedish governments announced a bill to establish a new National Mediation Office for industrial disputes.
