= CFCA (AM) =

Former radio station in Toronto, Ontario, Canada

- Toronto, Ontario; Canada
- Frequency: 770 kHz

Programming
- Language: English
- Format: Full service

Ownership
- Owner: Toronto Daily Star

History
- First air date: June 22, 1922
- Last air date: September 1, 1933
- Former frequencies: 400 metres (750 kHz)
- Call sign meaning: Canada's Finest Covers America

Technical information
- Power: 100 watts

CFCA was a radio station in Toronto, Ontario, owned by the Toronto Daily Star. Launched on 22 June 1922, it was Toronto's first regularly broadcasting licensed radio station and one of the earliest commercial radio stations in Canada. The station is also associated with the development of Canadian sports broadcasting, including the first live radio play-by-play hockey broadcast on 8 February 1923.

Before receiving its own licence, the Star sponsored experimental broadcasts over the Canadian Independent Telephone Company's station 9AH, later CKCE. CFCA operated from 1922 until 1933, when the Star closed the station after the creation of the Canadian Radio Broadcasting Commission and amid uncertainty over the future of private broadcasting in Canada.

== Origins on 9AH and CKCE ==
Toronto Daily Star owner Joseph E. Atkinson became interested in radio in the early 1920s, seeing it as both a public service and a promotional extension of the newspaper. In 1922, the Star arranged with the Canadian Independent Telephone Company (CITCo) to broadcast a concert over CITCo's experimental station 9AH.

The first Star-sponsored broadcast took place on 28 March 1922 from CITCo's studio in the General Electric factory at Wallace Avenue and Ward Street, near Lansdowne Avenue and Bloor Street West. The concert included Luigi Romanelli's orchestra, cellist Boris Hambourg, pianist Alberto Guerrero and violinist Henri Czaplinski. Dr. Charles A. Culver of CITCo announced, produced and directed the broadcast.

The broadcast was heard by radio hobbyists in Toronto, by an audience at Christie Street Military Hospital, and by more than 1,100 people gathered at the Masonic Temple, where a receiver had been set up on stage. Its success led the Star to sponsor a series of 19 concerts over 9AH and its successor CKCE between April and June 1922.

Beginning on 10 April 1922, the Star also sponsored a daily half-hour evening program. Its format included financial and sports bulletins, a guest speaker or musician, a children's bedtime story and a political bulletin telegraphed from the newspaper's Ottawa correspondent. The newspaper also began using radio for religious programming; on Easter morning in 1922, it carried a service from Bloor Street Baptist Church, later Yorkminster Park Baptist Church.

== Launch and early programming ==
The Star applied for and received one of the first commercial radio licences issued by the Department of Marine and Fisheries, then responsible for radio regulation in Canada. CFCA began broadcasting on 22 June 1922 from the Toronto Daily Star building at 18–20 King Street West. It was initially licensed to operate on 400 metres, equivalent to approximately 750 kHz, with a power of 100 watts.

The station's first facilities consisted of small studios in the Star building and an antenna system mounted on the roof. CITCo built the station's transmitter and also equipped the newspaper's mobile radio van, which was used to receive CFCA's signal and play it over loudspeakers in parks and other public places. The demonstrations were intended to introduce the public to radio and encourage the purchase of receivers.

In August 1922, during "Radio Year" at the Canadian National Exhibition, CFCA and CKCE took part in demonstrations at a Radio Building constructed for the fair. Loudspeakers broadcast music, speech, news and weather bulletins to visitors, helping popularize radio broadcasting in Toronto.

CFCA's programming mixed news, weather, market reports, sports, political bulletins, children's stories, religious broadcasts and live music. The station employed musicians and announcers and developed what was described as one of Canada's first radio orchestras. Reginald Stewart, musical director of Hart House, directed the station's orchestra, which performed on programs such as Hour of Good Music.

== News and public-service broadcasts ==
CFCA extended the Star's newspaper operations into live broadcasting. The station aired election results, weather reports, stock market figures, agricultural information and news bulletins. The Star used its mobile radio van and loudspeakers to bring broadcasts to crowds in Toronto and surrounding communities.

Notable early election broadcasts included the 1922 United Kingdom general election, the Toronto municipal election of 1 January 1923, the 1923 Ontario general election, and the 1925 and 1926 federal elections.

In February 1924, at the request of Canadian Press, CFCA broadcast summaries of wire dispatches to provincial newspapers after a storm disrupted telegraph and telephone service. The station's bulletins also helped correct rumours about the death of Prime Minister William Lyon Mackenzie King.

The station experimented with remote broadcasting in 1925, using long-distance telephone lines to carry the tercentenary celebration of Samuel de Champlain from Orillia. In 1928, it became one of the first North American stations to rebroadcast shortwave transmissions from overseas, including a broadcast from the BBC station 2LO in London, a program from Australia and a speech by the Prince of Wales.

== Sports broadcasting ==
CFCA played an important role in the development of Canadian sports broadcasting. On 8 February 1923, Toronto Daily Star reporter Norman Albert broadcast live play-by-play of the third period of an Ontario Hockey Association intermediate playoff game at Mutual Street Arena between North Toronto and Midland. The broadcast is widely cited as the first live radio play-by-play hockey broadcast.

Six days later, on 14 February 1923, CFCA carried a professional hockey game between the Toronto St. Patricks and the Ottawa Senators, making it one of the earliest radio broadcasts of a National Hockey League game. On 16 February 1923, Foster Hewitt broadcast an OHA game between the Argonaut Rowing Club and the Kitchener Greenshirts, a contest that went into three overtime periods.

Hewitt soon became CFCA's best-known sports announcer. He continued broadcasting hockey from Arena Gardens as the Toronto St. Patricks became the Toronto Maple Leafs, and his work on CFCA helped establish the style of Canadian hockey broadcasting that later developed into Hockey Night in Canada. Hewitt also broadcast horse racing from Woodbine Racetrack, among other sporting events.

== Studios, frequency and phantom-station use ==
In 1924, CFCA moved its studios to the top of the Procter & Gamble building at Yonge Street and St. Clair Avenue. During the mid-1920s, Toronto stations had to share frequencies and broadcast at different times of day because of the limited number of available channels and the technical limitations of early receivers. CFCA's seniority helped it obtain favourable evening time slots.

In 1928, CFCA was assigned a separate frequency of 770 kHz, allowing it to expand its broadcast schedule while continuing to operate with 100 watts of power. The decision became controversial because the rival Toronto Telegram, associated with CKGW, accused the Liberal government of favouring the pro-Liberal Daily Star. The controversy contributed to broader debate over Canadian radio policy and preceded the appointment of the Royal Commission on Radio Broadcasting, commonly known as the Aird Commission.

CFCA was also used by CNR Radio as the physical station for its Toronto phantom station, CNRT. A phantom station held its own licence and call sign but did not operate its own transmitter; instead, it leased time on an existing station. During CNRT broadcasts, CNR programming originated from its own facilities, including studios at the King Edward Hotel, while using CFCA's transmitter and frequency.

== Decline and closure ==
The Aird Commission reported in 1929 and recommended the creation of a publicly owned national broadcasting system. Atkinson and the Star supported the principle of public broadcasting, but uncertainty over future regulation discouraged major investment in CFCA. Plans for new studios in the Daily Star's new headquarters, opened in 1929, were not completed, and the station's transmitter power remained at 100 watts while competitors expanded their facilities.

The R. B. Bennett government created the Canadian Radio Broadcasting Commission under the Canadian Radio Broadcasting Act of 1932. The Act established a national public broadcaster but did not abolish private stations. CFCA nevertheless ceased operations on 1 September 1933. Atkinson stated that the Star was not interested in competing directly with a public broadcaster, and the cost of modernizing CFCA's equipment was difficult to justify during the Great Depression.

After CFCA closed, the Star remained involved in radio by supplying news bulletins and other material to CRCT, the Toronto station operated by the CRBC. The arrangement continued after the Canadian Broadcasting Corporation replaced the CRBC in 1936 and CRCT became CBL.

In 1947, the Star considered returning to broadcasting by applying for an early FM radio licence in Toronto, but the application was not pursued.

== Legacy ==
CFCA is remembered as Toronto's first regularly broadcasting licensed radio station, as an early example of newspaper-owned broadcasting in Canada, and as a pioneer in live sports and public-service radio. Its broadcasts helped introduce radio to Toronto listeners through concerts, public loudspeaker demonstrations, election coverage, church services, news bulletins and sporting events.

The station's role in early hockey broadcasting was especially influential. Norman Albert's 1923 play-by-play broadcast and Foster Hewitt's subsequent work on CFCA helped establish Toronto as an important centre for hockey broadcasting and contributed to the development of a national radio style later associated with Hockey Night in Canada.

The AM 770 frequency in the Toronto area is now occupied by WTOR, a daytime-only station licensed to Youngstown, New York. Under the North American Regional Broadcasting Agreement, CFCA would have been required to move from 770 to 780 kHz had it remained on the air after 1941.
