= Alan Plaunt =

Canadian politician (1904–1941)

Alan Butterworth Plaunt (March 25, 1904 – September 12, 1941) was a Canadian broadcasting pioneer, journalist and activist.

The son of a wealthy lumber family, Plaunt attended the University of Toronto and University of Oxford and was a keen observer of the fledgling British Broadcasting Corporation while in Britain becoming a believer in John Reith's approach to public broadcasting.

With Graham Spry, he founded the Canadian Radio League in 1930 to mobilize political support for the creation of a public broadcasting system, first in the form of the Canadian Radio Broadcasting Commission in 1932 and then with the creation of the Canadian Broadcasting Corporation in 1936. Plaunt sat on the original CBC Board of Governors from 1936 until 1941, when he resigned to protest what he saw as increasing government direction of the CBC during the war.

He was also an active socialist as a member of the League for Social Reconstruction and helped write the Regina Manifesto which was the original program of the Co-operative Commonwealth Federation.

Plaunt founded the New Canada Movement in 1933, an agrarian youth movement that advocated a "new deal" for farmers and promoted its views in the Farmer's Sun, (renamed New Commonwealth) the former journal of the United Farmers movement which he and Spry owned from 1932 until 1935.

In the last years of his life, Plaunt helped organize the Neutrality League, a pacifist organization that opposed Canadian participation in the looming conflict in Europe.

He died of cancer at the age of 37.
