= Phantom radio station =

Radio station that leased airtime from another

A phantom radio station was a station which did not operate their own radio transmitter, rather leasing unused airtime from a station which owned the transmitter.

In the early days of radio, non-phantom stations (or "physical" stations) only broadcast for a few hours per day. The remaining unused time could then be rented to other stations, who would broadcast through the physical station's equipment. The relatively constant programming also would result in more public interest, who would be encouraged to buy receivers.

In Canada, the Canadian National Railway radio network (based in Toronto) provided live national programs and some local programs during their broadcasts leased time on CFCA, CFRB, and CKGW. While leasing most of their airtime on other stations, the CNR also owned three stations: CNRA Moncton, CNRO Ottawa, and CNRV Vancouver. The network was disbanded in 1932.

The rival Canadian Pacific Railway also operated its own radio network beginning in 1930 under the name CPR Radio, operating in Toronto under the call letters CPRY ('Canadian Pacific Royal York') out of studios at CP's Royal York Hotel while leasing time on CFRB and CKGW.
