= Labor dispute disruptions of sports on television =

List of labor disputes affecting sports games on TV

The following is a list of labor-management disputes that caused disruptions in television coverage in sports events. This doesn't include work stoppages of the sports themselves (such as the Major League Baseball in 1981 and 1994, the National Basketball Association in 1998-99 and 2011, the National Football League in 1982 and 1987, or the National Hockey League in 1994-95, 2004-05, and 2012-13) but coverage disruptions which caused interruption/cancellation of the telecast itself or substitute on-air talent. This can be on a network level or local level.

== 1960s ==
In the spring of 1967, AFTRA (American Federation of Television and Radio Artists) was on strike against the then big three American networks that affected almost all programming; news, entertainment and sports, such as the commentator coverage of the Masters on CBS.

On April 8, 1967, that aforementioned strike action by the AFTRA forced ABC Sports producer Chuck Howard and director Chet Forte to call Game 4 of the NBA Eastern Conference Finals between Boston Celtics and Philadelphia 76ers, as its regular announcing team were members of the union.

Also on April 8, 1967, CBS was scheduled to broadcast the NHL game between the New York Rangers and Montreal Canadiens. However, the AFTRA strike forced cancellation of the telecast. The strike itself ultimately ended two days later. Canadian unions said they would not cover the game because of the AFTRA strike if the American network used it. CBS said a rebroadcast of that past January's Super Bowl football game between the Green Bay Packers and Kansas City Chiefs in Los Angeles would be substituted for the hockey game.

A strike of engineers and technicians against ABC impacted the September 23, 1967 Penn State/Navy college football telecast. In support of the strikers, Chris Schenkel and Bud Wilkinson refused to work the game. Therefore, Chuck Howard performed play-by-play with the SIDs of the two schools (Jim Tarman and Budd Thalman) providing color commentary.

== 1970s ==
In June 1970 viewers in the Granada area could not even watch much of ITV's coverage of the 1970 World Cup due to strike action by Granada's technicians.

In November 1970, the ITV colour strike resulted in many of ITV's sporting events including World of Sport and the weekly regional football highlights being broadcast in black and white.

In 1972, Hockey Night in Canada moved all playoff coverage from CBC to CTV to avoid conflict with the lengthy NABET strike against the CBC. Eventually, MacLaren Advertising, in conjunction with Molson Breweries and Imperial Oil/Esso, who actually owned the rights to Hockey Night in Canada (not CBC) decided to give the playoff telecast rights to CTV. Initially, it was on a game by game basis in the quarterfinals (Game 1 of the Boston-Toronto series was seen on CFTO Toronto in full while other CTV affiliates, but not all joined the game in progress. Game 1 of the New York Rangers-Montreal series was seen only on CFCF Montreal while Game 4 not televised due to a lockout of technicians at the Montreal Forum), and then the full semifinals and Stanley Cup Finals. Because CTV did not have 100% penetration in Canada at this time, they asked CBC (who ultimately refused) to allow whatever one of their affiliates were the sole network in that market to show the playoffs. As a result, the 1972 Stanley Cup playoffs were not seen in some of the smaller Canadian markets unless said markets were close enough to the United States border to pick up the signal of a CBS affiliate that carried Games, 1, 4, or 6 (Games 2, 3 and 5 were not nationally broadcast in the United States).

A CBS technicians strike in 1972 disrupted coverage of numerous NFL games. Some games were covered by local TV crews, while some were not seen at all. The scheduled commentators for CBS did not cross the picket lines and instead CBS had to scramble to substitute announcers. Billy Joe Patton and even the head of CBS Sports, Bill MacPhail, were among those that filled in.

According to the New York Times, the cut cables were discovered around noon. When CBS emergency crews (made up of supervisors) tried to bring other cables in from two trucks parked outside the stadium, a New York City cop saw a striking CBS technician trying to pry loose a cable that was hooked up to one of the trucks. At this point, the cop attempted to arrest the technician, but two of the latter's cohorts got involved, with a "scuffle" then breaking out. The first technician was arrested for criminal tampering, while the other two got hauled in on a host of other charges. CBS presumably figured it would be impossible to avoid having it happen again (although the strikers reportedly only numbered 25), so they just canceled the broadcast.

Interestingly, the San Francisco-Green Bay game at Milwaukee also had nine TV cables cut, but the picture was only out for eight minutes at the start of the second half. Finally, in the Los Angeles-Atlanta game, there were no replays because they had two less cameras in use because of the strike. That Sunday, CBS was also forced to preempt Face the Nation because of the strike, which is notable because it came just two days before the Presidential election.

There was a NABET/NBC strike in the spring of 1976 as was cited in Doug Hill and Jeff Weingrad's backstage history book about Saturday Night Live.

The 1977 NABET (National Association of Broadcast Employees and Technicians) strike of ABC affected the crew for the 1977 Indianapolis 500 broadcast. The on-air talent remained the same, but a number of technical workers were replaced.

1978 there was a dispute at the BBC in November/December firstly there was an overtime ban the first sport to be hit was the planned 1978 Davis Cup Final coverage on 8-10 December (a result of this was that ITV picked it up) and a week later Sports Review and Personality Of The Year 1978 was nearly curtailed just before Steve Ovett was about to receive the Sports Personality Of The Year trophy on the Wednesday night 13 December, 2 nights later Show Jumping coverage from Olympia on the Friday night 15 December was not shown and the following day/night 16th December Grandstand went ahead in the afternoon from lunchtime with interruptions, Match Of The Day was shortened so Show Jumping from Olympia could be shown this culminated in a strike a week later which ended at 10pm on 22 December which meant that the following day's Grandstand was not shown, but there was Final Score and later Match of the Day.

The 1979 Austrian Grand Prix went without a broadcast when the local cameramen for ORF, who was broadcasting went on strike. Since the local feed was also the world feed, a lot of people didn't get to see a race that day.

A number of events were not covered in the United Kingdom in August/September 1979 due to the fact that ITV held the UK rights to these events due to the 11 week ITV strike among, these events were the Ebor Festival, St Leger, and 1979 Ryder Cup.

== 1980s ==
Due to a NABET strike lasting from June–November 1987, NBC had management, supervisors and non-union workers filling technical roles on broadcasts out of 30 Rockefeller Plaza and Burbank. Meanwhile, NBC's news and sports departments set up a situation where they had replacement sports workers doing the NFL's replacement games during its own labor dispute.

Around this same time period, there was an NBC Game of the Week at New York's Shea Stadium, where there was a lengthy loss of audio, as well as one or two video glitches. This was either during or just prior to the deadline for a strike by the crewmembers' union, and there was speculation that the 'mistakes' were deliberate.

== 1990s ==
In November 1997, during the 3rd Round of the Tour Championship, ABC employees staged a one-day boycott due to an employee being disciplined for drawing an obscene cartoon of Disney chairman Michael Eisner. ABC showed final round coverage of the 1995 Tour Championship in the broadcast window.

From February 20 to March 27, 1999, Hockey Night in Canada telecasts were called off monitors at various sites across the United States due to a CBC technicians strike. This included the Toronto Maple Leafs' first game at Air Canada Centre, which used a feed provided by ESPN, and was called by Bob Cole and Harry Neale from Washington, D.C. A similar strike occurred in 2001, impacting games between December 8, and December 22.

== 2000s ==
In 2002, there was a strike at SRC which resulted in there being no commentators for the Saturday NHL broadcasts of La Soirée du hockey from March 23 through to the final Saturday of the regular season on April 13. The strike then carried over into the NHL playoffs, which meant their coverage of the first two rounds of the playoffs (Montreal Canadiens vs. Boston Bruins and Carolina Hurricanes) had no announcers. The strike was settled by the third round and the commentators returned to call the Eastern Conference final between the Toronto Maple Leafs and the Hurricanes.

CBC had to broadcast Canadian Football League games without commentators from mid-August until (Canadian) Thanksgiving in 2005. They even had to forfeit some games to TSN. The lockout was set to end just after Thanksgiving, but commentators were allowed to come back a bit early to do the opening Saturday night of the NHL season (the one after the lockout) and the Thanksgiving Day Classic CFL games. Also because of that particular labor stoppage, CBC had to give up rights of the Women's Rogers Cup to TSN/CTV. CBC was supposed to air both semis and the final, but TSN took over the afternoon semi and CTV took over the final, using TSN's production. One of the last events that CBC showed before the stoppage was the World Athletics Championships. Ron MacLean hosted it, and informed viewers of what was about to happen.
