= Talbot Heath School =

Girls' school in Bournemouth, Dorset, England

Coordinates: 50.731°N 1.901°W

Talbot Heath - Independent School for Girls

Location
- Rothesay Road; Talbot Woods, Bournemouth, Dorset, BH4 9NJ; England

Information
- Type: Private; Day and Boarding School
- Motto: ‘Honour before Honours’
- Religious affiliation: Church of England
- Established: 1886
- Department for Education URN: 113945 Tables
- Head Teacher: Ross Cameron
- Gender: Girls
- Enrollment: 550 pupils (Girls 2-18)
- Website: talbotheath.org

Talbot Heath School is a selective, private day and boarding school for girls aged 2–18 located in Talbot Woods, Bournemouth, Dorset, England. The school was founded as Bournemouth High School in 1886 by founding headmistress Mary Broad. Talbot Heath was originally a Church of England School.

== History ==
The school was bought by Mary Broad and Miss Thresher as a going concern from its owner in 1885. The school opened under new management in January 1886 with thirty pupils. The school was called Bournemouth High School and it intended to supply a liberal education for reasonable fees to the daughters of the middle classes. Broad converted from a non-conformist to the Church of England at this time. Miss Thresher left in 1889 when she married and Mary Broad was solely in charge.

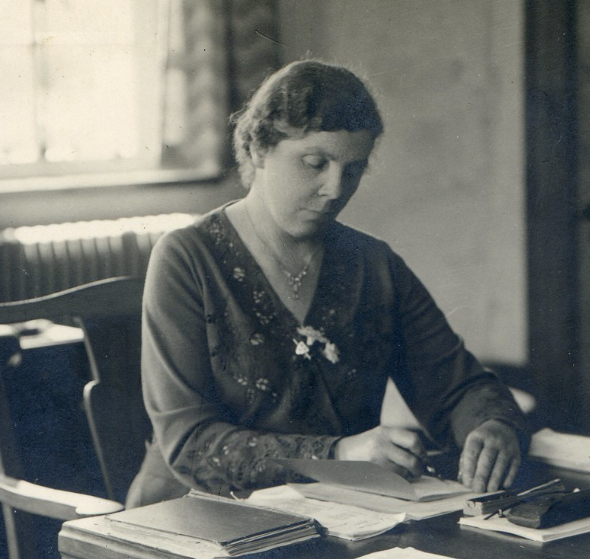
Cicely Frideswide Stocks, headmistress from 1924

Broad was known for doing what she thought was right, ignoring criticism and tradition. Her pupils were taken on nature walks, they used dumbbells, played hockey and cricket and they were taken on trips abroad. Broad took advice from Frances Buss who had created the North London Collegiate School in 1850. Broad hoped that her school could be as successful. Buss told her to not appoint a board of governors as they would hold back plans for new buildings. She eventually ignored this advice as she was not feeling well in 1898. She made a substantial endowment of the school and she gained management assistance. As Buss predicted there were no new substantive school buildings for twenty years. Students at the school under Broad's headship included the sculptor Helen Margaret George and the writer and film critic Dilys Powell.

Broad retired in 1924 and her place was taken by Cicely Frideswide Stocks and she introduced eight houses that were named after notable seamen. She also had physics labs built.

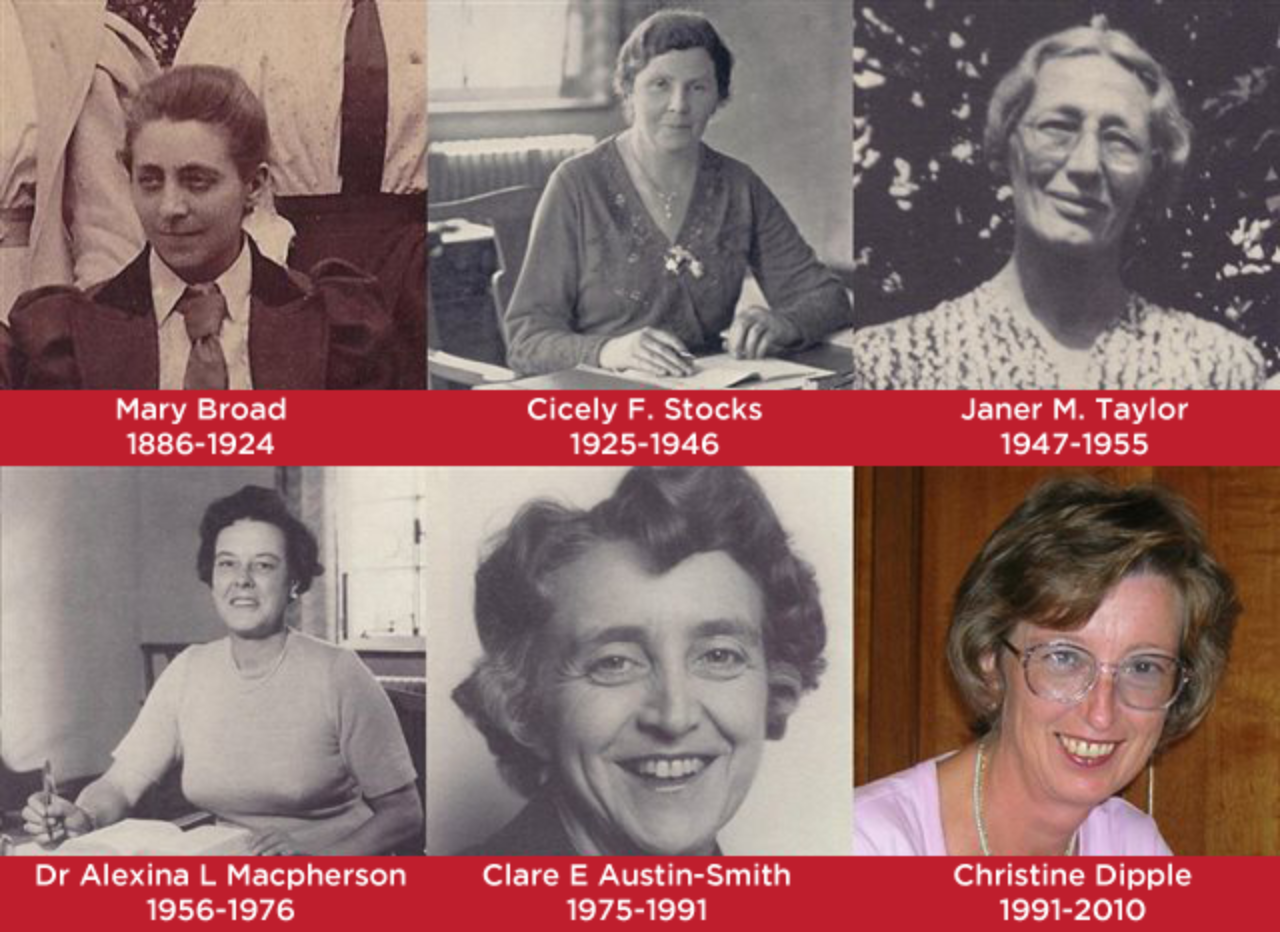
Talbot Heath Headmistresses

In 1935 "Talbot Heath School" was moved to new buildings designed by Hubert Worthington. There was a new hall and gym and within the first few months it was opened by Dr William Temple who was then the Archbishop of York. Mary Broad was in attendance together the headmistress Cicely Frideswide Stocks and other invited guests.

During the war, girls from St Anne's Catholic School in Southampton joined the school as they were moved to safety. This school was open throughout the war.

== Notable former pupils ==
- Frances Ashcroft
- Natalie Clein
- Fanny Cradock
- Eunice Crowther
- Nicole Faraday
- Helen Margaret George
- Philippa Glanville
- Dorothea Gray
- Dilys Powell
- Kate Royal
- Pat Smythe
- Irene Spry
- Jennifer Vyvyan
- Virginia Wade
- Shirley Williams, Baroness Williams of Crosby
