= 1999 CBC strike =

Labour strike in Canada

- Date: February 17 – April 3, 1999 (1 month, 2 weeks and 3 days)
- Location: Canada (except Moncton and Quebec)
- Caused by: Disagreements over the terms of a new labour contract
- Goals: Increased wages and job security
- Methods: Picketing; Strike action; Walkout
- Result: Union members receive wage increases of between 10 to 11 percent and job security guarantees

Parties
Communications, Energy and Paperworkers Union of Canada	Canadian Broadcasting Corporation

Number
1,800	

In February 1999, about 1,800 technicians at the Canadian Broadcasting Corporation (CBC) went on strike. The workers were represented by the Communications, Energy and Paperworkers Union of Canada (CEP) and were striking due to disagreements between the company and the union over a new labour contract, with the two sides being unable to reach a deal on wages and job security. The strike lasted from February 17 to April 3 and ended with a compromise deal between the two parties. The strike resulted in a decline in ratings for CBC's television programming during the dispute and resulted in production disruptions for several of the corporations' shows and movies.

== Background ==
In early 1999, the Canadian Broadcasting Corporation (CBC) was engaged in negotiations with the Communications, Energy and Paperworkers Union of Canada (CEP). The labour union represented about 1,800 technicians within the company, which had a total staff of about 10,000 at that time. The previous labour contract between the company and union had expired in June 1998, with the union members working without a contract for several months after that. In mid-February 1999, the two sides participated in three straight days of negotiations that were overseen by a mediator. The main points of contention centered on job security and wages.

On February 16, representatives of the CBC submitted a formal proposal that would have given union members a payment of about $700 (equivalent to $1,200 in 2025) during the first year of the contract, in addition to three percent wage increases that would go into effect on June 1, 1999, and June 1, 2000. Additionally, 434 employees in Toronto and Vancouver would have had their base salaries increased by $2,000 ($3,500 in 2025) in order to bring them up to the industry standard. One percent of the overall payroll towards CEP employees over the next two years would also have been spent on what the CBC called "job evaluation initiatives". However, the union was seeking a three-year deal that would have seen annual wage increases of five percent, in addition to a job safety guarantee for the first two years of the contract. The union said that technicians with the CBC were underpaid relative to technicians who worked for private sector broadcasters, who the union said made up to 30 percent more, though these figures were debated by the company. At the time, annual wages ranged from $18,000 ($32,000 in 2025) for assistants to $56,000 ($99,000 in 2025) for video journalists, (Note: A video journalist position involved work as both a camera operator and a reporter.) with camera operators making an average of roughly $45,000 ($80,000 in 2025).

== Course of the strike ==
The strike began shortly after midnight on February 17, 1999, with about 1,800 technicians performing a walkout. Most of Canada was affected, with the major exceptions of the province of Quebec and the New Brunswick city of Moncton, where technicians were represented by a different union. The strike affected broadcasts for both CBC Radio and CBC Television, with networks in some areas, including as Ottawa and Vancouver, going off the air. In many regions, networks aired documentaries and reruns, and CBC News: Morning was replaced with a pretaped program. Several nontechnical workers who were represented by the Canadian Media Guild (CMG), which counted about 3,300 CBC employees, supported the strikers by honoring their picket lines and not reporting for work. The same day that the strike began, the CBC requested an injunction to force nontechnical workers to return to work, and within several days, CMG workers had fully returned to work. However, on March 6, the CMG announced that its members had voted to authorize strike action against the CBC, with 85.5 percent of voting members opting in favour.

On the night of February 20, CEP members planned to picket outside of the Air Canada Centre in Toronto, where the Toronto Maple Leafs were going to play their first game in the newly constructed arena against the Montreal Canadiens. However, an injunction prevented picketing outside of the arena and the CBC broadcast the game without any incident. Union officials accused the company of lying to a judge in order to gain the injunction. By February 21, the CBC was still primarily airing reruns and what reporter Tamsen Tillson of Variety referred to as "[s]eat-of-the-pants live programming". On March 12, CBC News reported that the company had had to withdraw from negotiations for the rights to broadcast Soiree '99, an event held at Memorial Stadium in St. John's, Newfoundland, to celebrate the anniversary of Newfoundland's accession into Canada. The decision had been made due to the impact of the labour dispute and led to rival television corporation CTV Television Network gaining the broadcasting rights.

On March 21, Variety reported that the CBC and the CEP were in negotiations, with a company spokesperson saying that they were hopeful that a deal could soon be reached to bring the strike to an end. Several days earlier, on March 19, the CBC and the CMG had reached a tentative agreement for a new three-year labour contract. This averted a potential strike, as CMG members in several jurisdictions had planned to stage a walkout that day. However, in a show of support for the CEP, the CMG said that it would not ratify any new deal with the CBC until an agreement had been reached between the company and the technicians. On March 22, Playback reported that negotiations were still underway between the CBC and three unions: the CEP, the CMG, and the Canadian Union of Public Employees (CUPE), which represented office workers.

On April 3, CEP members voted to approve a deal with the CBC that would bring an end to the strike, with about 93 percent of voters in favour of the deal. Some members returned to work later that day to work on the production for the broadcast of the Calgary Flames–Toronto Maple Leafs ice hockey game, though most workers returned the following week. As part of the agreement, the union received some additional job security guarantees from the company and union members received wage increases of between 10 to 11 percent over the next 37 months. Mike Sullivan, the union's national representative, said concerning the agreement, "Our members are very, very happy with this deal and that the strike is over."

== Aftermath and legacy ==
The strike was the first one involving technicians at the CBC since a walkout in 1981 that lasted three months. According to reporter Brendan Kelly of Variety, the strike "crippled" the CBC's radio and television operations. Several productions were affected by the labour dispute. Possibly most notably, production was temporarily halted on Must Be Santa, a television film which was considered the company's biggest film project up to that point. Production on the film had begun on February 10, shortly before the strike began. Other CBC productions that were either halted or impacted by the strike included the television programs Foolish Heart, Hockey Talk, Pacific Rim, Pamela Wallin Live, Royal Canadian Air Farce, and This Hour Has 22 Minutes. Hockey Night in Canada continued to air during the strike, which reporter Ian Edwards of Playback attributed to "an all-out effort to continue the program without interruption" given its status as "the lucrative hallmark production of the public broadcaster". Additionally, some production work was outsourced by the CBC to other companies, such as Roadhouse Productions of Toronto. According to Variety, the ratings for CBC Television's main network decreased by roughly 20 percent during the strike, while the news program The National saw a 15 percent decline.

== See also ==
- History of broadcasting in Canada
- Labor dispute disruptions of sports on television
- List of strikes in Canada
- Timeline of strikes in 1999
- Timeline of the Canadian Broadcasting Corporation
