= Irene Spry =

Canadian economist

Irene Mary Spry, OC (née Biss: Standerton, Transvaal Colony, August 28, 1907 – Ottawa, Ontario, Canada, December 16, 1998) was an economic historian and social democrat awarded two honorary doctorates and named to the Order of Canada for her contributions to Canadian intellectual and public life.

== Profile ==
=== Early years ===
Spry was the daughter of Evan Ebenezer Biss, Inspector of Schools in the Colonial and Indian Service, and Amelia Bagshaw Johnstone. She attended Bournemouth High School and was a member of their Old Girls association.

=== Education ===
Spry began her undergraduate training at the London School of Economics (1924–25) and later obtained a graduate degree in economics at Girton College (1925–28) of the University of Cambridge, England, where she had been a student of J.M. Keynes, A.C. Pigou, D.H. Robertson and M. Dobb. This was followed by further studies for a master's degree (1928–29) in Social Research and Social Work at Bryn Mawr College, Pennsylvania, U.S.A.

=== Career ===
Spry's formal career as an economic historian began when she joined the Department of Political Economy at the University of Toronto in 1929 where she collaborated with the late H.A. Innis and taught Canadian economic history. Her marriage in 1938 to the late Graham Spry, and subsequent births of their three children, Robin, Richard and Lib, interrupted her academic career. However, during World War II she did serve actively on the Wartime Prices and Trade Board and its later affiliate, the Commodity Prices Stabilization Corporation, in Ottawa and, during the early postwar years, went to England and co-founded Saskatchewan House with her husband, broadcast reformer Graham Spry, who was Agent-General for Saskatchewan in London from 1946 to 1967.

Spry's work in the women's movement blossomed during her time in London. She represented the Federated Women's Institutes of Canada at the Associated Country Women of the World from 1954 to 1967, including service as the group's executive chair from 1959 to 1965. Her formal academic career eventually resumed in 1967, first at the University of Saskatchewan and finally at the University of Ottawa in 1968, where she would remain for the rest of her life.

Though officially retiring in 1973, Spry continued to teach courses at Ottawa's Department of Economics until the early 1980s and, indeed, gave lectures in Canadian economic history as recently as 1995. Throughout her retirement years, she maintained a strong intellectual presence at the University of Ottawa, and could be seen regularly at the National Archives of Canada with a magnifying glass to compensate for her worsening eyesight. Spry met regularly with colleagues and friends who shared her interests in Canadian economic history and public policy and who espoused the social democratic principles that she had relentlessly defended throughout her adult life, beginning with her membership in the League for Social Reconstruction in the 1930s. Moreover, she had an exceptional knowledge of the economic and social problems of countries other than Canada, notably of Europe.

=== Research ===
Professor Emeritus Spry died in her Ottawa home peacefully on December 16, 1998, at the age of 91. Her most recent book on the early economic history of Western Canada, entitled From the Hunt to the Homestead, was at the time due to be co-published by the University of Alberta and University of Calgary Presses. This latter work would largely have completed a line of research on Western Canadian economic history that began with her first two major books on the Palliser Expedition, published respectively in 1963 and 1968, which were then followed by her research on the records of the Department of the Interior regarding Canada’s western frontier of settlement, published in 1993.

In addition to Spry's authoritative work on the Palliser Expedition, her research on how the Canadian prairies transitioned from a commons to open access resources and, finally, to private property helped extend a branch of work often well-known even beyond the disciplines of economics and history, for instance in the prominence given Innis and the staples thesis in Canadian communications thought. Spry's comparison of the loss of the commons in England to the end of First Nations' communal rights, in particular, would echo much subsequent research on private intellectual property in contradistinction to communal resources.

- Spry, Irene M. (1963) The Palliser Expedition: The Dramatic Story of Western Canadian Exploration, 1857-1860. Toronto: MacMillan. Republished Toronto: Fifth House Publishers, 1995. ISBN 1-895618-52-5.
- Spry, Irene M., ed. (1968) The Papers of the Palliser Expedition, 1857-1860. Toronto: Champlain Society Press. ISBN 0-7766-3008-3.
- Crabbé, Philippe, and Irene M. Spry, eds. (1973) Natural Resource Development in Canada. Ottawa: University of Ottawa Press. ISBN 0-7766-3008-3.
- Spry, Irene M., and Bennett McCardle. (1993) The Records of the Department of the Interior and Research Concerning Canada's Western Frontier of Settlement. Regina: Canadian Plains Research Center. ISBN 0-88977-061-1.

=== Honours ===
Among many and varied honours, Irene Mary Spry received honorary doctorates from the University of Toronto (1971) and University of Ottawa (1985). The latter degree was conferred at the same time that a book in her honour entitled Explorations in Canadian Economic History was presented to her. The Governor General of Canada appointed her Officer of the Order of Canada in 1992 not only for her long and inspiring career as writer, teacher and scholar but also for her prominence in the Canadian and international women's movements.

== Archives ==
There is an Irene Spry fonds at Library and Archives Canada. It is archival reference number R2268 and former archival reference number MG30-C249. The fonds consists of 12.68 metres of textual records, 3,497 photographs, 320 maps, and a small amount of other media.
