= Reginald Stewart (conductor) =

Scottish conductor, pianist and music educator

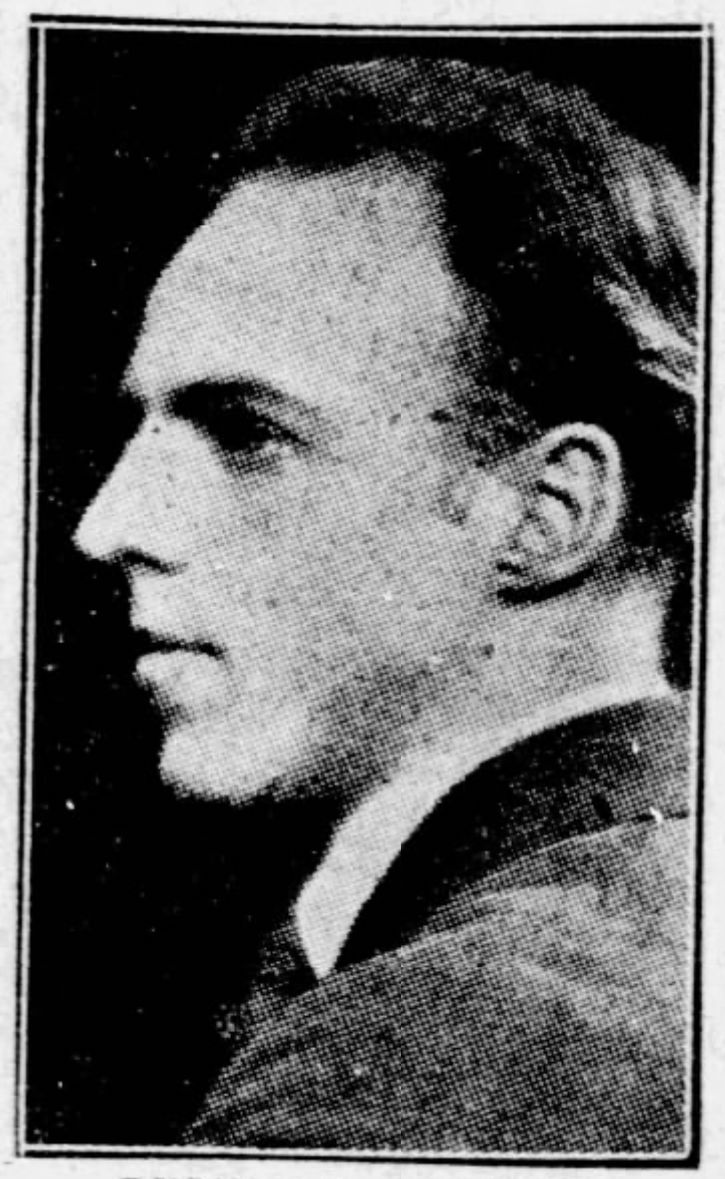
Reginald Stewart in 1925.

Reginald Stewart (20 April 1900 in Edinburgh – 8 July 1984 in Santa Barbara, California) was a Scottish conductor, pianist, and music educator who was chiefly active in the United States and Canada.

== Life and career ==
He was Born with in Edinburgh, Scotland, Stewart began his musical studies in his native city with H.T. Collinson, the choirmaster at St Mary's Cathedral. He then pursued studies with Arthur Friedheim and Mark Hambourg in Toronto, Canada, and with Nadia Boulanger and Isidor Philipp in Paris.

In the 1920s, Stewart was musical director at the University of Toronto's Hart House. During this period, he was hired by the Toronto Daily Star′s radio station, CFCA, to create and lead Canada's first radio orchestra, consisting of 50 musicians, for the station's regular dance program, Hour of Good Music.

Stewart is best remembered as the conductor of the Baltimore Symphony Orchestra (1942–1952) and the head of the Peabody Conservatory (1941–1958). In 1933 he founded the Toronto Bach Choir and in 1934 he founded the Toronto Philharmonic Orchestra. Stewart resigned from his conducting posts with both ensembles after accepting a position with Peabody in 1941.

In 1962 Stewart became an artist-in-residence at the Music Academy of the West in Montecito, California where he ultimately became chair of the piano department. He remained in Santa Barbara until his death at the age of 84 in July 1984.
