= CNR Radio =

First national radio network in North America

- Type: Radio network
- Country: Canada

Ownership
- Owner: Canadian National Railway
- Key people: Sir Henry Thornton (CNR President), W.D. Robb (Radio Dept. Head), W.H. Swift, Jr. (Dept. director)

History
- Launch date: 1923
- Closed: 1932 (assets sold to Canadian Radio Broadcasting Commission in 1933)

Coverage
- Availability: National (along CNR rail line), through stations owned or leased by the network

CNR Radio or CN Radio (officially the Canadian National Railways Radio Department/Société radiodiffusion des chemins de fer nationaux du Canada) was the first national radio network in North America. It was developed, owned and operated by the Canadian National Railway between 1923 and 1932 to provide en route entertainment and information for its train passengers. As broadcasts could be received by anyone living in the coverage area of station transmitters, the network provided radio programming to Canadians from the Pacific coast (at Vancouver) to the Atlantic coast (at Halifax).

During its nine-year existence, CNR Radio provided music, sports, information and drama programming to Canadians. Programming was produced in English, French and occasionally in some First Nations languages, and distributed nationwide through the railway's own telegraph lines and through rented airtime on other private radio stations. However, political and competitive pressure forced CNR Radio to close, with many of its assets and personnel migrating to a new government-operated agency, the Canadian Radio Broadcasting Commission (CRBC), which ultimately led to the Canadian Broadcasting Corporation.

== Origins ==
The network's origins were in the establishment by CNR president and chairman Sir Henry Thornton on June 1, 1923 of the CNR Radio Department after the CNR began installing radio sets with headphones in their passenger cars and needed stations to provide programming that passengers could listen to along the CNR's various routes, particularly its coast-to-coast transcontinental line. The general public could also receive the broadcasts if they lived in the vicinity of a CNR radio station and CN hotels were also equipped with radio sets for guests. Radio was also intended as an innovation that made travel on CNR trains more attractive and provided it with a competitive advantage over its rival, the Canadian Pacific Railway.

On October 9, 1923, the network made international news when it carried a broadcast of former British Prime Minister David Lloyd George being interviewed by reporters travelling with him from Montreal to Ottawa. The first regularly scheduled coast-to-coast network program produced by CN Radio was broadcast December 27, 1928. By the end of 1929 there were three hours of national programming a week.

The CNR used its already-established network of telegraph wires along the rail line to connect the stations.

== Aims ==
In comments to the House of Commons of Canada, the radio service's aims were:

... to provide a means of communication between the executive officers of the railway and the public - to advertise Canada and the Canadian National Railways - to furnish entertainment to passengers on long-distance trains and guests at the company's hotels - and generally to make the service of the railway more attractive to the public. As an advertising medium, radio telephony is unsurpassed, and the administration believes that in the establishment of a radio department, it has taken a unique and constructive step in railway operations.

— Minister of Railways and Canals,

In 1929, the CNR's brief to the Royal Commission on Radio Broadcasting stated that the radio service had five aims.

1. to advertise the railway
2. to publicize Canada's attractions to tourists
3. to entertain passengers
4. to "create a proper spirit of harmony among [CNR employees] and a broader appreciation of Management"
5. to assist colonization of Canada by providing radio service to remote settlers.

CNR president Thornton saw CNR Radio as a device to diffuse "ideas and ideals nationally by radio".

== Programming ==
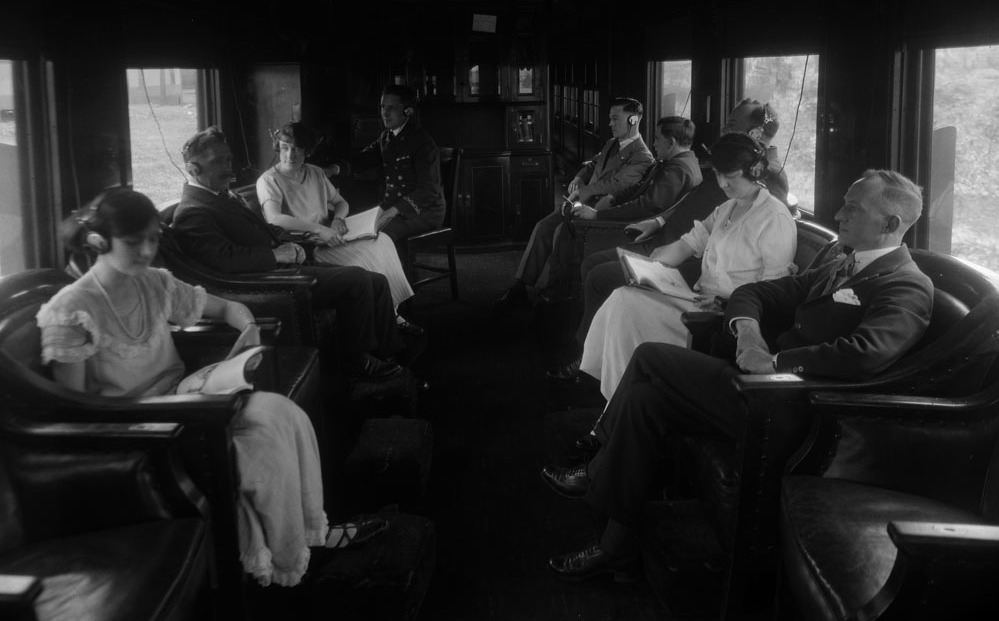
Passengers in a CN radio car, listening to broadcast programming in 1927, the first year of national service

While most programming was produced locally, increasingly there was a trend towards centralization and producing content with a national scope. Programming consisted largely of live music, drama, educational broadcasts, children's programming and simulcasts of American programming. Canada's first regular radio drama was CNRV Players produced at CNR Vancouver station CNRV by the CNR Drama Department from 1927 to 1932.

One of the network's most notable broadcasts was its transmission of the celebrations of the Diamond Jubilee of Canadian Confederation from Parliament Hill in Ottawa on July 1, 1927. The three-part broadcast, consisting of speeches, songs, poems and the peals of the carillion bells of the Canadian Parliament Buildings' Victory Tower, was CNR Radio's, and Canada's, first live coast-to-coast broadcast and was heard by an estimated audience of 5 million people listening to 23 stations in Canada, which received the broadcast via telephone and telegraph wires. The broadcast was also carried on NBC Radio in the United States and a shortwave relay was used to transmit the programme to the British Broadcasting Corporation which rebroadcast it throughout the United Kingdom and Europe.

Public service broadcasts such as news bulletins, weather reports, and local announcements were included. CNR Radio also produced, as a public service, educational programmes such as An Introduction to the Gilbert and Sullivan Operas, which was a series of lectures and performances for adults, and for children Radio Train in which an imaginary train travelled to a different location in each episode, with information about the sights and history of each locale. "In addition, the travelers would also encounter some mysterious problem that could only be solved at the end of the episode by the recall of facts and events that had been described." In 1927, CNRV in Vancouver aired a series of music lessons prepared by the Vancouver School Board.

Romance of Canada was a series of radio plays written by Merrill Denison and produced at CNR's Montreal studios. Renowned BBC radio playwright Tyrone Guthrie was director of the first 14 episodes. Broadcast over two seasons in 1931 and 1932, Romance of Canada recalled epic moments in Canadian history. Thornton hoped Romance of Canada would "kindle in Canadians generally a deeper interest in the romantic early history of their country".

What became Hockey Night in Canada originated on CNR Radio in November 1931 as the General Motors Hockey Broadcast. The programme, also known as Saturday Night Hockey, featured Toronto Maple Leafs games.

Music programing included Old-Time Fiddlers contests which were broadcast to the full network from Moncton. In 1925, CNRT in Toronto broadcast a complete performance of Yeoman of the Guard as well as performances of classical music. In the same year, CNRM in Montreal broadcast a complete in-studio production of The Mikado and other Gilbert and Sullivan comic operas with a full orchestra and CNR Radio signed a contract with the Hart House String Quartet and in 1927, put them on national tour with broadcasts from each station in celebration of Beethoven's centenary. By the 1930s, the network was airing condensed studio productions of great operas. In 1929, CNR Radio launched North America's first transcontinental concert series, the All-Canada Symphony Concerts featuring the Toronto Symphony Orchestra conducted by Luigi von Kunits for a series of 25 broadcasts. The music performed was composed entirely by Canadian composers. CNRV Vancouver produced several shows celebrating Beethoven's centenary. The network also had its own radio orchestra conducted by Henri Miro in 1930 and 1931.

Other programming included broadcasts in French beginning in 1924 with the opening of CNRM in Montreal; by the 1930s CNR Radio had a French network in operation. Some programs were also produced and broadcast in some Native Canadian languages from 1927 over CNRO Ottawa and CNRW Winnipeg. Regular network distribution of CNR programming to all its stations and affiliates began in 1928.

== Operations ==
Thornton's goal was for the CNR to create a network of radio stations along the CNR's transcontinental line from coast-to-coast with CNR sponsoring and controlling the content allowing programming across the country to be consistent, if desired, so that passengers could listen to programmes consistently as they travelled across the country rather than have conflicting programs fade in and fade out along the way. The CNR was able to use its existing network of telegraph wires, which were strung on poles alongside CN's track network, to transmit programs from one station to another, which allowed CN Radio to broadcast programs over stations across the country, simultaneously.

By 1925, a 10-station network was established. By 1930, the network consisted of 27 stations, 87 amplifiers, eight studios as well as 27 radio engineers and many telegraph engineers and line repair staff. Three of the stations, CNRA in Moncton, CNRV in Vancouver and CNRO in Ottawa, were owned by the CNR and transmitted at a strength of 500 watts. CNRO was located in the towers of the Chateau Laurier hotel. The rest of the network consisted of "phantom stations", or existing privately owned radio stations on which CNR leased airtime. A CNR call sign would be heard on the phantoms during times of the day when it was leased by the railway, after which the CNR station would "sign off" and the regular station would resume broadcast. The radio network broadcasts could be received by train passengers through headsets or loud speakers aboard specially equipped train cars as well as by anyone living within signal range of a station. CNR issued printed program guides for free distribution to any member of the general public who requested them. CNR stations and affiliates were linked by the CNR's telegraph lines that ran alongside the rail track. The network owned studios in several cities where it used "phantom stations" for transmission including Toronto where it had studios located in the King Edward Hotel, Halifax with studios in the CNR owned Hotel Nova Scotian and Montreal where it had studios in the King's Hall Building.

== Demise ==
In 1928, the Liberal government of William Lyon Mackenzie King commissioned a Royal Commission on Broadcasting (the Aird Commission) to study the future of radio in Canada. The Aird Commission issued its report in late 1929 calling for the creation of a public broadcasting system in Canada along the lines of the British Broadcasting Corporation and other national broadcasters around the world in order to prevent U.S. domination of Canadian airwaves and to promote national objectives. To this end, the report called for the creation of a Canadian Radio Broadcasting Company which would build high-powered radio stations across the country as part of a public radio network.

Meanwhile, CNR's radio network was a target of its commercial rival, the privately owned Canadian Pacific Railway. CNR Radio was a commercial venture with the primary purpose of attracting riders to the CNR by offering them entertainment as well as, beginning in 1929, providing direct revenue to its parent by selling advertising. The CPR complained intently that by allowing government-owned Canadian National to operate a radio network, particularly one that sold advertising, the government was allowing CNR to engage in unfair competition. In 1930, the CPR began construction of its own radio network — Canadian Pacific Radio — but due to financial difficulties during the Great Depression it was closed in 1935.

The 1930 federal election resulted in the defeat of the Mackenzie King government and the assumption of power by a Conservative government led by R.B. Bennett who, as a corporate lawyer who had had the Canadian Pacific Railway as one of his clients, proved sympathetic to its arguments and opposed any government competition with the CPR and was determined to strip the CNR of its radio network.A group of Conservative Members of Parliament successfully pressured Thornton, the radio network's principal champion, to resign as president of CNR in 1932 - he was also stripped of his pension.

In November 1931, as a result of intense pressure from the Railway Committee of the House of Commons of Canada, the CNR ended its on-train radio reception service, and ceased broadcasting entirely in 1932. The Canadian Radio League lobbied heavily for the implementation of the Aird Commission report creating a public broadcasting system under the aegis of a new government agency, and in 1932 the Bennett government agreed to set up the CRBC. In early 1933, the CNR sold its radio stations and studios to the CRBC for $50,000; many of the CNR's radio staff went to the CRBC as well. In turn, the CRBC's facilities and much of its staff were taken over by the Canadian Broadcasting Corporation when it was created in 1936.

CNR network (1924/25)

== CNR owned-and-operated stations ==
Call sign	City	Later history
CNRO	Ottawa	Originally CKCH; later CRCO, now CBO-FM
CNRA	Moncton	Later CRCA; went dark in 1933 and was replaced in 1939 by CBA in Sackville, New Brunswick
CNRV	Vancouver	Later CRCV and CBR, now CBU

== CNR leased phantom stations ==
CNR call sign	City	Station used	Notes
CNRC	Calgary	CFAC; CFCN	Leased station facilities
CNRE	Edmonton	CJCA	CKUA became a network affiliate in 1930–31
CNRW	Winnipeg	CKY	Leased station facilities
CNRT	Toronto	CFCA	Toronto phantom station
CNRX	Toronto	CFRB	CNR also used CKGW for some CNR-paid time
CNRM	Montreal	CKAC	Leased station facilities
CNRQ	Quebec City	CKCV	Leased station facilities
CNRR	Regina	CKCK	Leased station facilities
CNRS	Saskatoon	CFQC	Leased station facilities
CNRD	Red Deer	CKLC	Leased station facilities
CNRL	London, Ontario	CJGC	Leased station facilities
CNRH	Halifax	CHNS	Leased station facilities

Phantom stations also existed at various times in Saint John, Fredericton, London/Kitchener-Waterloo, Chatham, Brandon, Yorkton, Red Deer, two in Hamilton, a third in Toronto and one in Michigan.

== See also ==
- History of broadcasting in Canada
- Canadian Pacific Radio - operated by the CNR's rival from 1930 to 1935
