= Friends of Canadian Media =

Canadian advocacy group

Friends of Canadian Media (formerly Friends of Public Broadcasting and Friends of Canadian Broadcasting, styled FRIENDS) is a Canadian advocacy group that monitors developments in the Canadian television and radio broadcasting industries. The group promotes expansion of public broadcasting, investment in Canadian content, and production of local news while opposing concentration of media ownership and foreign ownership of Canadian broadcasters.

In 2023, Friends of Canadian Media called for a two-day boycott of posting on Facebook and Instagram after Meta Platforms' response to the passing of the Online News Act.

Friends of Canadian Media presents the Dalton Camp Award, named for journalist and political commentator Dalton Camp. The $10,000 award is presented to the winner of an essay competition on the link between Canadian media and democracy.

== See also ==
- Canadian Radio League
- Media in Canada
