= Canadian Radio League =

Political advocacy organization

The Canadian Radio League (French: Ligue canadienne de la radio) was a public pressure group led by Graham Spry and Alan Plaunt to mobilize support for the establishment of public broadcasting in Canada.

The League was founded in 1930 in order to lobby for the implementation of the 1929 Report of the Royal Commission on Radio Broadcasting (Aird Commission) recommending the creation of a Canadian Radio Broadcasting Commission (the forerunner of the Canadian Broadcasting Corporation.) Prime Minister William Lyon Mackenzie King had delayed implementation of the Aird Commission's report until after the 1930 federal election. However, with the defeat of King's government and the election of a Conservative government led by R.B. Bennett, the future of public broadcasting become uncertain.

Spry and Plaunt founded the League and used it to influence public opinion in support of public broadcasting making their case to trade unions, farm groups, business associations, churches, the Royal Canadian Legion, the Canadian Club of Toronto, newspapers, university presidents and other influential public figures.

The Canadian parliament held public hearings into the future of broadcasting in Canada at which the League testified urging the creation of a national public broadcasting system that would reflect Canadians' identity and be free from the influence of private American interests. "The choice before the committee is clear," Spry affirmed during the hearings. "It is a choice between commercial interests and the people's interest. It is a choice between the state and the United States."

Largely as a result of the CRL's efforts, the Bennett government introduced the Canadian Broadcasting Act of 1932 creating the CRBC.

In 1968 Spry revived the CRL as the Canadian Broadcasting League when the creation of a new Broadcast Act threatened the future of the CBC. For the next two decades it was active lobbying on the issue of public broadcasting and the cable television industry profits, funding for the CBC, educational broadcasting and legislation. It remained active until the late 1980s.

== See also ==
- Friends of Canadian Broadcasting (modern-day equivalent)
