= CBC Radio =

Canadian broadcaster

- Country: Canada
- Broadcast area: Canada and border areas of the United States via terrestrial transmission, worldwide via the internet and satellite

History
- Launch date: November 2, 1936; 90 years ago
- Replaced: Canadian Radio Broadcasting Commission

Coverage
- Stations: CBC Radio One; CBC Music; CBC Radio 3

Links
- Website: www.cbc.ca/radio/

CBC Radio is the English-language radio operations of the Canadian Broadcasting Corporation. The CBC operates a number of radio networks serving different audiences and programming niches, all of which (regardless of language) are outlined below.

== English ==
CBC Radio operates three English language networks.

- CBC Radio One – Primarily news and information, Radio One broadcasts to most communities across Canada. Until 1997, it was known as "CBC Radio".
- CBC Music – Broadcasts an adult music format with a variety of genres, with the classical genre generally restricted to midday hours. From 2007 to 2018, it was known as "CBC Radio 2".
- CBC Radio 3 – Broadcasts a youth-oriented indie rock format through the CBC's online radio platform, and formerly on SiriusXM. Some content from Radio 3 was also broadcast as weekend programming on Radio Two until March 2007.

The inconsistency of branding between the word "One" and the numerals "2" and "3" was a deliberate design choice on CBC's part and is not an error; however, from 1997 to 2007, CBC Music was known as "CBC Radio Two".

From 1944 to 1962 the CBC's English service operated two radio networks, the main Trans-Canada Network and the Dominion Network. In 1962 the Dominion Network was disbanded and the Trans-Canada Network became known as CBC Radio and in 1997, CBC Radio One. In some cases CBC announcers will still say "CBC Radio" in reference to programs that air only on Radio One.

CBC Music originated in 1960 as the CBC FM network. It was rebranded as CBC Stereo in 1975, and then CBC Radio Two in 1997 before becoming CBC Music in 2018.

In August 2009, CBC Radio launched a mobile app, initially for iOS, featuring streams of the three services, and other web-exclusive stations. In February 2012, the CBC launched a new, similar streaming platform and app known as CBC Music. In October 2019, CBC Music was succeeded by CBC Listen, a new platform that encompasses CBC Radio and CBC Music content, as well as CBC-produced podcasts.

== French ==
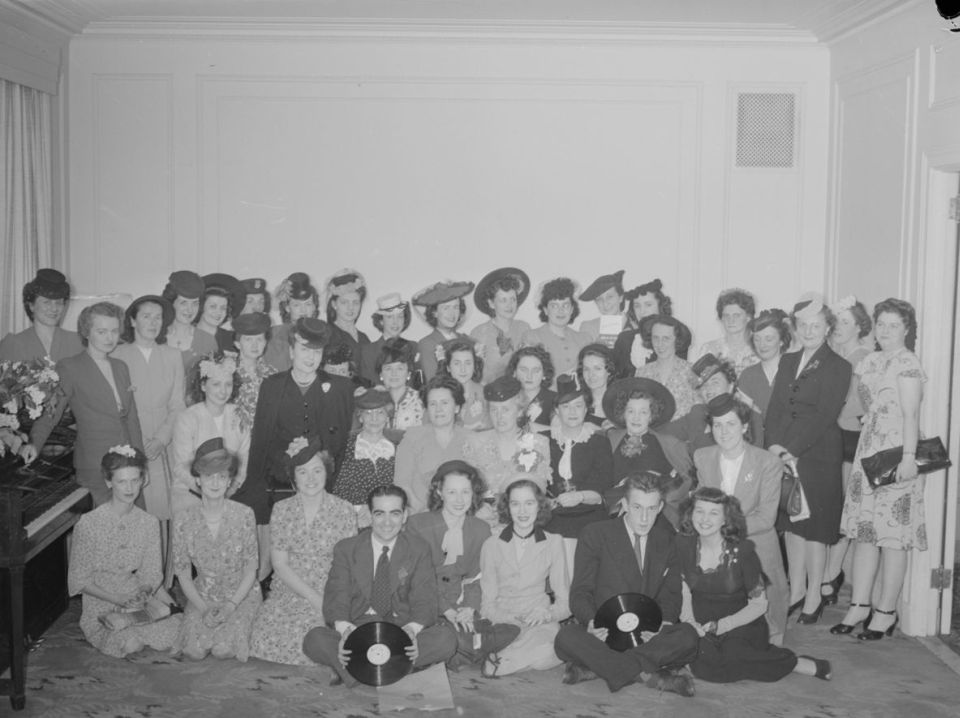
Radio-Canada employees in 1945

The CBC (better known in French as la Société Radio-Canada, or colloquially simply Radio-Canada) also operates three French language radio networks, two of which have a similar programming focus as the corporation's English-language radio networks.

Structurally, the French-language radio operations are managed as part of the CBC's overall French-language services division and therefore have limited ties to the English-language radio networks, which are structured similarly (i.e., there is no overall "CBC Radio" division responsible for both English and French radio).

- Ici Radio-Canada Première – News and information.
- Ici Musique – Music, arts and culture.
- Ici Musique Classique – Classical music service broadcasting online and through HD Radio in Ottawa and Montreal.
- Ici Musique Hip-Hop – Urban music, particularly hip hop, R&B and world music broadcasting through online.
- Ici Musique Rock – Rock, alternative, punk and heavy metal broadcasting through online.
- Ici Musique atmosphère – Relaxing music broadcasting through online.

== CBC North ==
In the Northwest Territories, Yukon, Nunavut, and northern Quebec, CBC North airs a modified Radio One schedule to accommodate programming in Indigenous languages.

== Podcasts ==
CBC Radio has 14 original podcasts. Two of the podcasts, Someone Knows Something and Missing & Murdered, are ranked among the top shows on the iTunes and Stitcher charts. In addition, select podcasts are often now broadcast on its terrestrial radio network as supplement material, typically during the summer programming months of July and August to fill time such as on The Current when regular programming is reduced during the summer period.

=== Someone Knows Something ===
"Someone Knows Something," hosted by filmmaker David Ridgen, first aired in 2016. The show, which investigates cold cases in Canada and the United States, finished its fourth season in March 2018. In season three, Ridgen worked with a Mississippi man, Thomas Moore, to solve the 1964 kidnapping and murder of Moore's brother, Charles, and his friend, Henry Dee. As a result of information uncovered by the podcast, James Ford Seale, a former member of the KKK, was convicted of the killings in 2007 and received three life sentences for his crimes against Moore and Dee. Season four returned to Canada as Ridgen sought answers in the 1996 unsolved murder case of Wayne Greavette, an Ontario man killed by a bomb that was disguised as a Christmas gift and sent to his home. Season four ended in March 2018 and had the fewest episodes of the series.

=== Missing & Murdered ===
Investigative journalist Connie Walker hosts "Missing & Murdered," a podcast that looks into deaths and disappearances of indigenous women in Canada. The show's first season, "Missing & Murdered: Who Killed Alberta Williams," covered the unsolved homicide of Alberta Williams who went missing from Prince Rupert, British Columbia, after a night out with friends. Her body was discovered days later along Highway 16, which has since become known as "the Highway of Tears." Following the show, the Royal Canadian Mounted Police announced the case was once again active. The second season, released in March 2018, helped a family find out what happened to their teenage sister, Cleo Semaganis Nicotine, after she was sent to the United States from Saskatchewan during the "Sixties Scoop." The stories featured on this podcast are part of a broader effort by Walker, who is Cree, and CBC News to raise awareness about the more than 250 unsolved disappearances and homicides of indigenous women and girls across Canada. In 2017, the RCMP announced an initiative to stop violence against indigenous women and girls, citing studies were done in 2014 that found they are among the most likely populations to be victims of violent crime.

== Other services ==
The CBC operates Radio Canada International (RCI), an online service. RCI ended its shortwave radio broadcast in June 2012.

In some remote Canadian tourist areas, such as national or provincial parks, the CBC also operates a series of transmitters that broadcast weather alerts from Environment Canada's Weatheradio Canada service.

The CBC formerly operated Galaxie, a digital television radio service that provides 45 channels of music programming to digital cable subscribers in both English and French. This service is now operated by Stingray Digital, who since relaunched the service as Stingray Music. The CBC also celebrates the generation of leaders, builders, and change-makers of Canada under the age of 40 through the CBC Future 40 People Choice Award.

== CBC Radio in the news ==
In 2012, CBC Radio lost some of its funding due to large cuts in Canadian government spending. This has resulted in a reduction of the number of concerts being recorded, the closing of recording studios, and the laying off technicians, as well as the introduction of four minutes per hour of advertising on the Radio 2 and Espace Musique stations. The CBC's requirement to air advertising on the stations expired on August 31, 2016; it was fully discontinued on September 1.

== See also ==
- 1999 CBC strike
- List of CBC radio AM transmitters in Canada
- List of defunct CBC radio transmitters in Canada
