= Hector Charlesworth =

Canadian writer, editor and critic

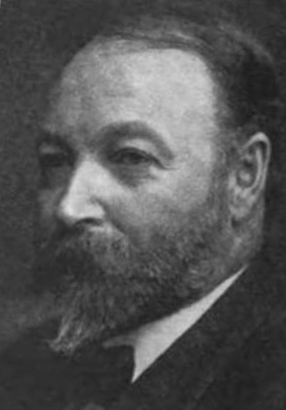
- Born: Hector Willoughby Charlesworth; 28 September 1872; Hamilton, Ontario
- Died: 30 December 1945 (aged 73); Toronto, Ontario
- Occupations: Writer, editor
- Political party: Liberal-Conservative
- Spouse: Katherine Ryan (m. 1897; div. 1944)
- Children: 2

Hector Willoughby Charlesworth (28 September 1872 – 30 December 1945) was a Canadian writer, editor, and critic.

== Biography ==
Hector Charlesworth was born in Hamilton on 28 September 1872. He married Katherine Ryan on 15 February 1897, and they had two children.

From 1904 to 1910 he was an editor and critic at the Toronto Mail and Empire. In 1910 he went to Saturday Night and was its editor from 1926 to 1932. From 1932 to 1936 he was chair of the newly formed Canadian Radio Broadcasting Commission (precursor to the Canadian Broadcasting Corporation), after which he returned to writing reviews and criticism for Saturday Night and newspapers.

In his art criticism he was noted for his antagonism to the Group of Seven, and "For them he became the embodiment of reactionary opposition to new ways of painting the Canadian landscape."

His wife Katherine died in July 1944. He died at his home in Toronto on 30 December 1945.

== Books ==
- Candid Chronicles (1925)
- More Candid Chronicles (1929)
- I'm Telling You (1937)
- A sweet summer Dream in November (1939)

=== Editor ===
- Charlesworth, Hector Willoughby, ed. (1919). A Cyclopædia of Canadian biography. Toronto: Hunter-Rose Company. OCLC 1042901332.
