= Pete Parker =

Canadian ice hockey radio broadcaster

Lionel Dyke "Pete" Parker (September 7, 1895 – February 11, 1991) was a Canadian radio broadcaster known as one of the pioneers of ice hockey play-by-play coverage. He was among the earliest individuals to call ice hockey games on the radio. Parker also served overseas during World War I, from 1916 to 1919.

== Career ==
On March 14, 1923, Parker delivered the world's first full play-by-play radio broadcast of a professional ice hockey game. The broadcast aired on CKCK Radio in Regina, Saskatchewan, and featured a Western Canada Hockey League matchup between the Regina Capitals and the Edmonton Eskimos at Exhibition Park, with Edmonton winning 1–0. Canada's Sports Hall of Fame officially recognized this historic event in 1972. It occurred one month after Norman Albert called just the third period of a game between Midland and North Toronto of the Ontario Hockey Association on February 8 and shortly after the first complete radio broadcast of a game, between the Winnipeg Falcons and the Port Arthur Bearcats, aired on February 22 via Winnipeg's CJCG station, owned by the Manitoba Free Press.

For a long time, it was believed that Parker's broadcast occurred eight days before Foster Hewitt's first Hockey Night in Canada broadcast on March 22, 1923, as noted in Hewitt's biography. However, records show there was no game held at Toronto's Arena Gardens on that date. It's now thought that Hewitt's actual first hockey broadcast may have taken place earlier, on February 16, when he called only the third period of a game between Toronto and Kitchener.
