= Helen Margaret George =

English artist

- Born: 1883; Blandford, Dorset, England
- Died: 1982 (aged 98–99)
- Known for: Sculpture and painting

Helen Margaret George (1883–1982) was an English artist and sculptor.

She was born in Blandford, Dorset and was educated at Talbot Heath School in Bournemouth and she then studied sculpture in Paris under Antoine Bourdelle. George exhibited sculptures and group compositions, often on the theme of motherhood, at the Royal Academy in London, with the Royal Society of British Sculptors, the Society of Women Artists and at the Leicester Galleries and the Goupil Gallery during the inter-war period. She exhibited widely in America and in Paris at both the Salon des Artistes Francais and the Salon d'Automne. The Victoria and Albert Museum in London, Salford Museum and Art Gallery and Manchester City Art Gallery all hold examples of her work.
