= Augustin Frigon =

Canadian engineer and administrator (1888–1952)

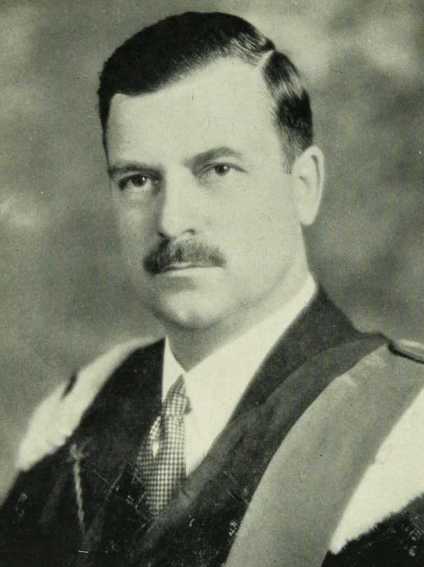
Augustin Frigon

Augustin Frigon, CMG (6 March 1888 – 9 July 1952), was a Canadian engineer and administrator. He was principal of the École polytechnique de Montréal from 1933 to 1952 and general manager of the Canadian Broadcasting Corporation from 1944 to 1951.

Born in Montreal, Frigon was educated at the École polytechnique de Montréal, the Massachusetts Institute of Technology, and the University of Paris. He was a professor at the École polytechnique from 1909, director of the school from 1923 to 1935, and principal from 1936 to 1952 (ad interim from 1933 to 1935).

He was Director-General of Technical Training of the Province of Quebec from 1924 to 1935 and a member of the National Research Council Canada from 1924 to 1939. A member of the Royal Commission on Radio Broadcasting from 1928 to 1929, he became deputy general manager of the Canadian Broadcasting Corporation from 1936 to 1944, then general manager from 1944 to 1951.
