= Norman Albert =

Norman B. Albert (1897 – 25 December 1974) was a Canadian journalist and radio reporter. He was the first to broadcast an ice hockey game for radio.

== First radio broadcast of ice hockey ==
Norman Albert called the third period of an OHA Intermediate playoff game on 8 February 1923 when North Toronto defeated Midland 16–4. This game, like the early broadcasts of Foster Hewitt, was aired on Toronto radio station CFCA, which was owned by the Toronto Star where both Hewitt and Albert were employed. Albert is known to have broadcast three or four games, all in 1923. The Toronto Star of 9 February 1923 (page 9) confirms that Albert made the first broadcast on 8 February. The other dates are likely 14 February, 24 February and 27 February. The game on 14 February featured the Toronto St. Pats and the Ottawa Senators, and is the first NHL game to be broadcast.
