= Canadian Radio Broadcasting Commission =

First public broadcaster of Canada

- Type: Radio network, public broadcaster and broadcasting regulator
- Country: Canada

Ownership
- Owner: Government of Canada
- Key people: Hector Charlesworth; Thomas Maher; W. Arthur Steel; Ernie Bushnell

History
- Launch date: May 26, 1932
- Replaced: CNR Radio (assets acquired)
- Closed: November 2, 1936
- Replaced by: Canadian Broadcasting Corporation

Coverage
- Availability: National, through owned, leased and affiliated stations

The Canadian Radio Broadcasting Commission (CRBC; French: Commission canadienne de radiodiffusion, CCR), also referred to as the Canadian Radio Commission (CRC), was Canada's first national public broadcaster and the immediate predecessor of the Canadian Broadcasting Corporation (CBC). It existed from 1932 to 1936 and combined two roles: operating a national public radio service and regulating private radio broadcasting in Canada.

The CRBC was created by the government of R. B. Bennett following the recommendations of the 1929 Royal Commission on Radio Broadcasting, commonly known as the Aird Commission, and after lobbying by the Canadian Radio League. It acquired several stations and facilities from CNR Radio, Canada’s first national radio network, and used a mixture of owned stations, leased facilities and private affiliates to distribute national programming. On 2 November 1936, it was replaced by the CBC, a more autonomous Crown corporation.

== Origins ==
Canadian broadcasting in the 1920s developed largely through private stations, railway broadcasting and experimental services. By the end of the decade, policymakers were increasingly concerned about uneven Canadian coverage, interference among stations, and the growing influence of American radio signals and network programs. The federal government appointed the Royal Commission on Radio Broadcasting in 1928 to study how broadcasting could best serve Canadian listeners and national interests.

The Aird Commission reported on 11 September 1929 and recommended a national public broadcasting system. It proposed a public body that would regulate private broadcasters and operate its own programs and stations. The report also called for high-power stations across Canada, financed by radio licence fees, limited advertising and public funding.

Implementation was delayed by the onset of the Great Depression and by the change of government after the 1930 Canadian federal election. In 1930, Graham Spry and Alan Plaunt founded the Canadian Radio League, which campaigned for a publicly controlled national broadcasting system based on the Aird recommendations.

A constitutional issue also had to be resolved. In 1932, the Judicial Committee of the Privy Council confirmed that radio broadcasting fell under federal jurisdiction. The Bennett government then introduced the Canadian Radio Broadcasting Act, which established the Canadian Radio Broadcasting Commission on 26 May 1932.

Prime Minister Bennett defended public control of broadcasting, arguing that Canada required Canadian control over broadcasting if radio was to foster national consciousness and national unity.

== Commissioners and mandate ==
The CRBC was governed by three commissioners. Bennett appointed Hector Charlesworth, editor of Saturday Night, as chairman. The other commissioners were Thomas Maher, a Quebec Conservative and director of a private radio station in Quebec City, and Lieutenant-Colonel W. Arthur Steel, a technical consultant to the Parliamentary Radio Committee and former chief radio officer with the Canadian Corps during the First World War.

The Commission's mandate was broad. It was empowered to regulate and control broadcasting in Canada, to originate and transmit programs, and to lease, purchase or construct stations and other facilities. In practice, however, the Depression severely limited what the Commission could build. Rather than replacing private broadcasting with a public monopoly, the CRBC relied heavily on private stations to carry its national programs, creating a mixed public-private system that became a lasting feature of Canadian broadcasting.

== Regulation ==
The CRBC was both a broadcaster and the national broadcasting regulator. Under the Canadian Radio Broadcasting Act, it was responsible for supervising private radio stations as well as its own network. Its regulatory functions included decisions about station licensing, location, power, frequency use, and the balance between local and national programming.

The Commission's dual role was later inherited by the CBC. In 1958, regulatory responsibility was separated from the public broadcaster and assigned to the Board of Broadcast Governors. In 1968, a new Broadcasting Act created the Canadian Radio-Television Commission, later renamed the Canadian Radio-television and Telecommunications Commission.

== Operations ==
One of the CRBC's first major actions was to purchase the former CNR Radio stations in Ottawa, Vancouver and Moncton for $50,000. The Commission also acquired or used CNR studios and facilities in several cities. It established or leased stations in Montreal, Chicoutimi and Toronto, and recruited private stations in other cities to carry at least three hours a day of CRBC network programming. These private outlets were known as "basic stations".

CRBC-owned or leased stations generally used call signs beginning with "CRC". Because the Commission lacked the funds to build a full national system of high-power transmitters, much of its national coverage depended on privately owned affiliates. Where more than one station served a market, stations that were not the basic affiliate could carry CRBC programs not broadcast by the basic station.

Several former CNR Radio employees joined the CRBC. E. Austin Weir, formerly of CNR Radio, became the first program director, but he was demoted and then dismissed after disagreements with the commissioners over the pace and volume of programming. The CRBC then hired experienced private-sector broadcasters, including Ernie Bushnell, who became responsible for programs originating in Ontario and Western Canada, Arthur Dupont, who oversaw Quebec and the Maritimes, and Horace Stovin, who became western program director.

== Programming ==
The CRBC began regular national programming modestly. On 23 February 1933, it offered two hours of national programming a week, scheduled on Tuesday and Thursday evenings. By the fall of 1935, weekday network time had increased to about six hours, with longer schedules on weekends. Weekend programming included Metropolitan Opera radio broadcasts from NBC on Saturdays and New York Philharmonic broadcasts from CBS on Sundays.

The Commission's programs included orchestral music, drama, educational broadcasts, news, weather, public affairs, religious programs and sports. Early national programming included bilingual presentation from Montreal, where announcers introduced programs and musical selections in both English and French.

Among the CRBC's dramatic and informational programs were Forgotten Footsteps, written by Don Henshaw, and The Youngbloods of Beaver Bend, a dramatized serial about life on a western Canadian farm written by Peter Dales and produced from CKY Winnipeg by Esse W. Ljungh. One of the best-known national drama series was Radio Theatre Guild, produced in Montreal by Rupert Caplan. Under Bushnell, the number of weekly English-language dramatic series increased significantly before the CRBC was replaced by the CBC.

The CRBC also continued hockey broadcasts that had originated on CNR Radio. What later became Hockey Night in Canada was carried under names including Saturday Night Hockey, the General Motors Hockey Broadcast, and, from 1934, the Imperial Oil Hockey Broadcast. The programme broadcast games of the Toronto Maple Leafs across the country with a 5-station hookup in Quebec carrying the games of the Montreal Canadiens in French and the Montreal Maroons in English.

The Northern Messenger began in December 1933 as a late-night weekly program for people living in the Canadian North. Originating from Toronto, it carried news, recorded music and personal messages to RCMP officers, missionaries, trappers and other northern listeners. The program was later continued by the CBC for decades.

The CRBC provided several notable national broadcasts. Its coverage of the 1935 Canadian federal election was the first nationwide radio coverage of a Canadian federal election. In April 1936, it provided extensive live coverage of the Moose River Mine disaster in Nova Scotia. Announcer J. Frank Willis reported from the minehead every half hour for nearly five days while rescue workers attempted to reach three trapped miners. The reports were made available to Canadian stations, more than 650 stations in the United States, and the BBC. In July 1936, the CRBC also carried shortwave coverage from France of King Edward VIII unveiling the Canadian National Vimy Memorial. All CRBC programming was live, as the Commission did not have recording facilities. The network therefore relied heavily on affiliates for studios, equipment and local staff.

== Advertising and controversy ==
The CRBC was underfunded compared with the system recommended by the Aird Commission. Its budget was far below the $2.5 million recommended by the Aird Report, and the Commission increasingly turned to sponsored programming and advertising to supplement government support. In its final year, the CRBC earned $236,000 from sponsored programs.

The Commission was criticized from several directions. The Canadian Radio League, which had campaigned for public broadcasting, argued that the CRBC was not ambitious enough and that its programming was too weak. The Liberal opposition accused the Commission of favouring the governing Conservatives.

During the 1935 Canadian federal election campaign, the CRBC broadcast a series of 15-minute dramatized political programs called Mr. Sage, created by the Conservative Party's advertising agency. The programs criticized William Lyon Mackenzie King and the Liberal Party of Canada. After King won the election, the incident became one of the factors behind the Liberal government's decision to replace the CRBC with a new public broadcaster.

== Replacement by the CBC ==
After the 1935 election, the King government introduced new broadcasting legislation. The resulting Canadian Broadcasting Act replaced the CRBC with the Canadian Broadcasting Corporation, a Crown corporation intended to have a more arm's-length relationship with the government. The CBC began operations on 2 November 1936. Charlesworth and the CRBC management were dismissed, and the new corporation inherited the CRBC's stations, staff, network arrangements and much of its regulatory authority.

Licensing and wavelength allocation were assigned to the Department of Transport, while broader regulatory powers were given to the CBC. This arrangement remained in place until 1958, when the Board of Broadcast Governors was created as a separate regulator.

Although the CRBC was short-lived and politically controversial, it established the basic framework for national public radio in Canada and demonstrated that Canadian programming could be distributed across the country through a combination of public stations and private affiliates.

== CRBC owned or leased stations ==
CRBC owned or leased stations
Call sign	City	Frequency	Later history
CRCA	Moncton		Acquired from CNR Radio; closed 31 October 1933 amid plans for a more powerful station at Sackville, New Brunswick. A successor station, CBA, was later opened by the CBC.
CRCK	Quebec City	1050 AM	Later became CBV-FM
CRCS	Chicoutimi	950 AM	Later became CBJ-FM
CRCM	Montreal	910 AM	Later became CBME-FM
CRCO	Ottawa	880 AM	Former CNR station; later became CBO-FM
CRCT	Toronto	840 AM	Leased from Gooderham & Worts; later became CBL
CRCY	Toronto	1030 AM and 1420 AM	Leased; later became CJBC on 860 AM
CRCW	Windsor	600 AM	Later became CBEW-FM
CRCV	Vancouver	1100 AM	Former CNR station; later became CBU

All except the Moncton station later became part of CBC Radio or Radio-Canada.

== CRBC affiliates ==
CRBC private affiliates
Station	City	Province	Notes
CHNS	Halifax	Nova Scotia	
CHSJ	Saint John	New Brunswick	
CHNC	New Carlisle	Quebec	
CKCH	Hull	Quebec	Now defunct
CFRC	Kingston	Ontario	
CFPL	London	Ontario	
CKY	Winnipeg	Manitoba	Later became CBW
CKCK	Regina	Saskatchewan	
CFQC	Saskatoon	Saskatchewan	
CKBI	Prince Albert	Saskatchewan	
CHAB	Moose Jaw	Saskatchewan	
CJCA	Edmonton	Alberta	
CFAC	Calgary	Alberta	
CHWK	Chilliwack	British Columbia	
CFCJ	Kamloops	British Columbia	
CKOV	Kelowna	British Columbia	
CJAT	Trail	British Columbia	

Except for CKY, which later became CBW, the private affiliates were not retained as CBC owned-and-operated stations.

== Shortwave station ==
The CRBC also leased and operated the shortwave station CRCX in Bowmanville, Ontario, formerly VE9GW, which broadcast on 6095 kHz. The station was leased from Gooderham & Worts together with Toronto station CRCT, formerly CKGW, which transmitted from the same Bowmanville site.

CRCX was used to extend CRBC programming beyond the reach of ordinary medium-wave stations. Its shortwave signal was particularly useful for reaching remote northern listeners, including people in isolated communities and outposts where regular mail, telephone and broadcast service were limited or unavailable during the winter. Beginning in December 1933, the CRBC's Canadian Northern Messenger was carried on the Commission's medium-wave network and on Canadian shortwave stations, including VE9GW/CRCX at Bowmanville, VE9DN at Drummondville, Quebec, and VE9CL and VE9JR at Winnipeg.

The shortwave broadcasts were aimed at listeners in Canada's far north, including RCMP officers, missionaries, trappers, medical workers, scientists, Cree and Inuit listeners, and other residents of remote northern areas. The program carried listener letters, family messages, news and recorded music from November to May, when transportation and mail service were most difficult.

CRCX therefore functioned as part of the CRBC's northern and remote-area coverage rather than simply as a local Toronto-area relay. The CBC purchased CRCX and CRCT from Gooderham & Worts in 1937, after leasing them for a year, but closed the shortwave station in 1938.

== See also ==
- CNR Radio
- Canadian Broadcasting Corporation
- History of broadcasting in Canada
- Canadian Pacific Radio
