= Royal Commission on Radio Broadcasting =

- Also known as: Aird Commission
- Commissioners: John Aird (Chair); Charles A. Bowman; Augustin Frigon
- Inquiry period: 1928 – 11 September 1929
- Authorized: Order in Council P.C. 2108

The Royal Commission on Radio Broadcasting, otherwise known as the Aird Commission, was chaired by John Aird and examined Canada's broadcasting industry. The report released its findings in 1929 when it concluded that Canada was in need of a publicly funded radio broadcast system and a governing regulator for all broadcasting throughout the country. The Aird Report eventually resulted in the 1932 creation of the Canadian Radio Broadcasting Commission, the forerunner of the CBC as well as the CRTC.

== History ==
From 1922-1932, the radio administration came under the Department of Marine and Fisheries.

With only dozens of radio stations broadcasting within Canada, and few Canadian households owning radios, the Radio Broadcasting industry was not a top agenda issue for the Federal Government in the 1920s. However, a series of controversial and ungoverned attacks over the airwaves, directed mainly at the Catholic Church and the Canadian Government, became a matter of public and political importance. This led to debates on how broadcasting should be managed. These problems included the feeling that religious radio stations had "...emerged as a new weapon with which one religious group could bludgeon another...", and that U.S. stations unfairly dominated the airwaves despite an agreement to reserve some frequencies exclusively for Canadian stations.

== The Commissioners ==
In December 1928, under the direction of Prime Minister William Lyon Mackenzie King, P.J. Arthur (Minister of Marine and Fisheries) formed the Aird Commission to report on federal broadcasting policy. Sir John Aird and his colleagues Charles A. Bowman, Esq. (Editor of the Ottawa Citizen), Augustin Frigon, D.Sc. (Director of École Polytechnique in Montreal), and Donald Manson, Esq., (Chief Inspector of Radio, Department of Marine and Fisheries) set out to examine how radio broadcasting is done abroad and how it could be improved on home soil. Between April 17 and July 24, the commission heard 164 oral statements, took 124 written submissions, and had the comments of nine provinces and controlled conventions.

Travelling across Europe and the United States, the commission made several observations regarding the inner workings of radio stations and their ownership. It was noted that some of the best broadcasting was done in Germany and the United Kingdom, where they both made use of a public broadcaster. What they also observed was a dependence on advertising revenue in many radio markets. This dependence led the commission to conclude that, when it came to matters of public importance, Canadians should have access to uninterrupted public broadcasting free of solicitation. The latter notion was at times abandoned in hopes to stimulate Canadian businesses during the Great Depression.

“We believe that private enterprise is to be commended for its effort to provide entertainment for the benefit of the public with no direct return of revenue. This lack of revenue has, however, tended more and more to force too much advertising upon the listener. It also would appear to result in the crowding of stations into urban centres and the consequent duplication of services in such places, leaving other large populated areas ineffectively served.”
-John Aird, Report of the Royal Commission on Radio Broadcasting, 1929

Without regulation, the commissioners feared that American radio stations would take over Canada. At this time, the United States was facing issues at their southern border with several “Border Blaster” signals taking listenership away from domestic stations. The Commission sought to protect Canada from such activity.

There were some disagreements amongst Commissioners regarding who should control this new proposed public broadcaster. This debate continued until 1932, when the Judicial Committee of the Privy Council ultimately decided that this was a federal matter.

Based on the report, a national company, the Canadian Radio Broadcasting Commission, was set up that would have power to operate and own all radio stations in Canada. Further control was given to the provinces to broadcast the content they want but within the provincial boundaries.

== Demise and legacy ==
After the Liberal government (who initially put together this Commission) had fallen in the Election of 1930, the Aird Report fell into the hands of the new Prime Minister R.B. Bennett. This eventually led to the passing of the Radio Broadcasting Act (1932). This created the Canadian Radio Broadcasting Commission, predecessor to the Canadian Broadcasting Corporation (CBC) as well as the Canadian Radio-Telecommunications Commission (CRTC). This early CRBC was meant to serve as a free public broadcaster, under federal control for purposes of education and entertainment. The CRBC also served as the regulatory governing body for all private radio stations. Bennett’s Radio Broadcasting Act had proposed an eventual takeover of all private radio stations by the federal government, something which to this day has never materialized. At this time, one-third of Canadians owned a home radio receiver. There was a mandatory annual licensing fee for radio owners. Although it wasn’t free, it was considered an affordable means of entertainment for a country suffering through the Great Depression.

As licensing fees alone were not enough for the CRBC to survive, advertising slots were provided for Canadian businesses. This was dually useful as the crippled Canadian economy would benefit from the business generated.

After some very controversial and partisan programming, the CRBC became a target from the liberal government who had just come back to power with Mackenzie King's most recent re-election in 1935. With 2 formal investigations in the mid-1930s from special Parliamentary Committees, the Canadian Radio Broadcasting Commission was disbanded. The broadcasting element of the CRBC was succeeded in 1936 by what we know today as the Canadian Broadcasting Corporation. The regulatory element of the CRBC and later the CBC eventually evolved into the Board of Broadcast Governors (BBG), and then into the Canadian Radio-television and Telecommunications Commission (CRTC).
