= The Tower of Babble =

Canadian non-fiction book by Richard Stursberg

The Tower of Babble Sins, Secrets and Successes inside the CBC
- Author: Richard Stursberg
- Language: English
- Subject: CBC Television
- Genre: Memoir
- Publisher: Douglas & McIntyre
- Publication date: April 2012
- Publication place: Canada
- Media type: Print (Hardcover) and ebook
- Pages: 288
- ISBN: 9781926812731
- OCLC: 816417502

The Tower of Babble: Sins, Secrets and Successes inside the CBC is a Canadian non-fiction book written by Richard Stursberg. The book is a memoir detailing Stursberg's experience as the vice-president in charge of English services at the Canadian Broadcasting Corporation (CBC) between October 2004 and August 2010. Stursberg was recruited by CBC president Robert Rabinovitch who understood and supported Stursberg's intention to move the CBC's focus more towards producing popular content with success and failure defined by the number of people who watch, rather than awards or critical praise. The book covers a range of topics relating to CBC, including acquiring popular shows, like Little Mosque on the Prairie and Heartland, for CBC Television, modernizing news coverage at CBC News, adjustments to CBC Radio, and CBC Sports losing broadcasting rights to its competitors.

This tell-all memoir was called entertaining but was met with mixed reviews. While it was valued as an insider account of a well-known institution, the author used the book to aggressively defend his views without relating to opposing views, and elaborate on what he views to be the CBC's deficiencies.

== Background ==
When The Tower of Babble was released in April 2012, a little over one and a half years had elapsed since its author Richard Stursberg left the Canadian Broadcasting Corporation (CBC), in August 2010. Stursberg had been recruited by CBC president Robert Rabinovitch, as his vice-president in charge of English services. Stursberg had previously worked in the media business, most recently as the director of Telefilm Canada (2001–2004). He entered CBC in October 2004, to replace the retiring Harold Redekopp, with the idea of changing the network's direction, away from its focus on high arts and towards popular content. Though Rabinovitch supported him, Stursberg understood how difficult that transition would be and that he would face resistance and criticism. Stursberg's vision was not supported by Rabinovitch's successor, Hubert Lacroix, who eventually replaced Stursberg with Kirstine Stewart. The 63-year-old Stursberg left CBC in August 2010 and by October 2011 publisher Douglas & McIntyre acquired the world rights to his memoir. Douglas & McIntyre's parent company, D&M Publishers, filed for bankruptcy in October 2012, still owing Stursberg $13,000.

== Synopsis ==
Our job was simple. We should make great Canadian content for Canadians. Nothing more. We would know whether we had won or lost based on whether Canadians watched, listened or read what we made. They were the only judges who counted. Enough with all the drivel of "mandates" and "quality" and "higher purposes." It was time to commit ourselves completely to the essential thing, the brutally hard thing, the only thing that could ever count: making content Canadians found compelling. And there could be only one way to know we had succeeded: audiences. Everything else was self-absorption and entitlement.

— Stursberg, The Tower of Babble, p. 4

The book is divided into ten subject-related chapters. The first chapter provides an introduction to how Stursberg entered the CBC scene, how he viewed his role replacing the retiring Harold Redekopp as the executive vice president in charge of English services, and previews what challenges he would encounter. The second chapter covers his experience entering CBC senior management amid contract negotiations with its union, the resulting lock out during summer 2005, and the relations between what he labeled the Gang of Four (senior management) and the Central Committee (union representatives). In the third chapter, Entertainment, he explains his plan for re-orienting CBC television towards entertainment which would use audience numbers to gauge success. He cancelled critically acclaimed shows (Da Vinci's City Hall, This Is Wonderland, and Opening Night) which had low ratings and ordered what he expected would be more audience-friendly shows. Beginning in summer 2006, the first new show under Stursberg's strategy, The One, received very low ratings and was quickly cancelled. That Autumn's schedule, though, was successful, introducing Little Mosque on the Prairie, The Tudors, Heartland. The next year's schedule introduced the successful The Border and Being Erica but also the unsuccessful MVP and jPod. Strusberg's move of Marketplace to Friday nights resulted in higher ratings but his plan to move The National to 11pm was denied by the CBC board of directors. In the fourth chapter, The French, he details his relationship with his French counterpart, the style differences between English and French television shows, the disproportionate funding given to the French services, and the lack of CBC Board members who can understand French. As a means of trying to bridge the two cultures, he ordered English versions of the popular Quebec shows Rumours and Sophie but both received low ratings in English Canada.

In the fifth chapter, Stursberg recounts CBC's experience losing sports licenses. While the CBC had superior market placement (with respect to geographic coverage and experience with amateur sports), they lost the 2010 and 2012 Olympics to a joint CTV/TSN/Rogers $153 million bid. The Canadian Football League moved its broadcasting rights to TSN with Stursberg citing Commissioner Tom Wright's displeasure with the CBC's poor coverage of CFL games during the CBC 2005 lock-out. The CBC also lost broadcasting rights for The Brier and the Tournament of Hearts to CTV/TSN. Stursberg negotiated for Hockey Night in Canada's NHL rights with Gary Bettman and managed to extend their contract, but at a significantly higher price. The sixth chapter deals with CBC News which, as Stursberg explains, were scheduled to have the local newscasts eliminated. Instead, he initiated style and content reforms, taking effect in October 2009, including the creation of an internal newswire to provide stories suitable for TV, radio, and web services. He also commissioned an independent study to analyze a perceived anti-conservative bias in news coverage but the study found the coverage to be more conservative friendly than either the Global or CTV coverage. The chapter on Radio noted CBC Radio One's dominance in the Canadian radio market but CBC Radio Two's low ratings. Stursberg advocated for more local radio coverage, especially in the Hamilton area, and facilitated the programming change of CBC Radio Two by inserting more musical variety, specializing in Canadian music.

Chapter 8, Money, describes the internal debate at CBC regarding how to cover a $70 million loss in advertising revenue from the 2008-2009 recession with the government unwilling to cover the deficit or allow CBC to incur debt. Ultimately, they decided on cutting 400 jobs, reducing the number of episodes ordered, and selling excess real estate. Chapter 9, The Plan, addresses CBC's adaption to new technology and the consolidation of the Canadian telecommunications industry. Stursberg details his struggles with the new CBC president Hubert Lacroix, who did not endorse Stursberg's strategy of providing popular content and initiated a new strategic planning process. In the final chapter Stursberg notes the changes that have occurred since his departure and predicts the demise of CBC Sports as it loses NHL rights to CTV/TSN.

== Genre and style ==
The Tower of Babble is a memoir that focuses on how Stursberg saw CBC operations between 2004 and 2010. He reveals details about his relationships with CBC presidents, Robert Rabinovitch and Hubert Lacroix and his fellow executives. Written about a year after he left CBC, Stursberg uses several themes such as illustrating the corporation's deficiencies, such as the motif "superior losers" to describe attitude of superiority at the CBC despite low ratings, elaborating on what CBC should be (providers of popular content), and defending his work there. His aggressive defense against his critics was compared to a similar tactic found in Conrad Black's memoir, A Matter of Principle, which was released only a few months before. In addition to being called a "tell-all memoir", the book was also described as "as much an elegy as a chronicle", a "catalogued defence...[or] parting shot" and like a "diary of a battlefield general". Regarding the title, a biblical reference to the Tower of Babel, one reviewer believed it to "hint at Stursberg's view of [CBC] as the place that business common sense forgot" while another reviewer thought it "reflect[ed] the warring languages spoken by the author and his detractors"

== Publication and reception ==
The book was published by the Vancouver-based publisher Douglas & McIntyre. They published the hardcover and ebook versions in April 2012. Stursberg promoted it through reading and book signing events across Canada, including in Winnipeg, Calgary, and Vancouver, as well as at the Ottawa International Writers Festival. Excerpts were published in the National Post, the Regina Leader-Post, Winnipeg Free Press, Ottawa Citizen, and Maclean's.

The book was called "entertaining" as well as "tough and eloquent". As a memoir, one reviewer called it "well-documented" though another complained about the use of unattributed quotations. The Winnipeg Free Press described the book as "certain to infuriate the CBC's strongest adherents. ... its proclamations, though, deserve attention, strident though they may be. Not only is this the leading account of a tumultuous time within the institution—history written by a partial victor—but some elements of its prescription may help restore the public broadcaster to health. In particular, Stursberg's analysis of the "intimidating frenemies" on the international media landscape merits attention." Arts and culture editor Mike Landry of the Telegraph-Journal found that "while well-written, his attempts at humour and levity in The Tower of Babble often fall flat, more confusing than chuckle-inducing."

Writer Peter C. Newman concluded that "Stursberg's rage dominates his crackling autobiography - as does his grief for the lost network's unfulfilled promise." Columnist Martin Knelman, in the Toronto Star, advised, "Don't expect a balanced account of the troubles that brewed. This is strictly the Gospel According to Richard - entertaining but also blatantly self-serving. ... He had no appetite for compromise, consensus or conciliation. He seemed to relish the chance to shock people, make them angry and create dramatic showdowns. Now with this book, he seizes the chance to attack those who stood in his way." Knelman found the best parts were "the passages where he goes after his perceived enemies with a hatchet", while Newman found "the volume's most devastating profile [to be] that of CBC president Hubert Lacroix".

Critic John Doyle wrote, "From what I've seen, there is a lot of self-serving blather in Stursberg's book, and his loathing for shows that are "dark" (Da Vinci's Inquest, Intelligence) is comical. But he's correct that there is something genuinely appalling about CBC's hand-wringing about where it goes." One journalist reported that the president of Canada Media Research challenged Stursberg's interpretation of CBC's ratings, failing to take into account a new method of calculating ratings which made the numbers appear higher, though Stursberg countered that he only used rating numbers that came from the CBC's research department.
