= Peter Stursberg =

Canadian writer and broadcaster

- Born: Arthur Lewis Peter Stursberg; August 31, 1913; Yantai, Republic of China
- Died: August 31, 2014 (aged 101); Vancouver, British Columbia, Canada
- Occupation: Journalism
- Known for: War correspondent
- Spouse: Jessamy Anderson (née Robertson) m. 1946 (1915–2008)
- Awards: Order of Canada

Arthur Lewis Peter Stursberg, known as Peter Stursberg, CM (August 31, 1913 – August 31, 2014) was a Canadian writer and broadcaster.

== Life and career ==
Stursberg was born in Yantai, China, the son of Mary Ellen (née Shaw) and Walter Arthur Stursberg, who was working for the Chinese postal service. His father was born in Canada to a German father from the Rhineland and an English mother, while his mother was born in China to an English father and a Japanese mother.

At the age of seven, Stursberg's parents took him on a world tour before returning to China. At age 11, Stursberg was sent to a boarding school in England. Several years later his parents returned to Canada. He joined them and went on to graduate from West Hill High School in Montreal. He then took his British matriculation at Bedford School before returning to Montreal in 1930 to attend McGill University where he studied sciences and wrote for the McGill Daily. As a result of the Great Depression, Stursberg's parents suffered a reversal in their economic status and moved to a farm on Vancouver Island. Stursberg left university to follow them west and worked at a number of odd jobs including working in a logging camp, on farms and odd jobs.

In 1934, Stursberg found a job as agricultural editor of the Victoria Daily Times. Curious about the situation in Europe, he embarked on a tour of the continent in 1938 visiting France, Germany, Austria, Czechoslovakia, Hungary, Romania, and the Soviet Union where he was briefly detained for a visa violation. He filed stories as a freelance reporter during his tour and was hired on the strength of these pieces as a war reporter for the London Daily Herald.

With the outbreak of World War II in 1939, Stursberg returned to Canada to join the Vancouver Daily Province. He joined the Canadian Broadcasting Corporation (CBC) in Vancouver in 1941 as a news editor. In 1942 he enlisted in the Royal Canadian Navy before becoming a war correspondent for the CBC later that year.

Stursberg spent his career as a foreign correspondent, newspaper editor, television newscaster and commentator, and author. He was recognised as one of the best Canadian correspondents of the Second World War, reporting for CBC Radio from the front lines in Italy and France. He published a book in 1944, Journey Into Victory, based on his experience. In 1945, he left the CBC to return to the Daily Herald as a foreign correspondent. He rejoined CBC in 1950 as the network's United Nations correspondent, leaving again in 1956 to join the Toronto Daily Star as Ottawa editorial correspondent. He left journalism in 1957 to work as a researcher and speechwriter for Prime Minister John Diefenbaker who subsequently appointed him press officer to the Canadian Trade Mission to the United Kingdom in 1957 and later, in 1958, secretary of the Trade Mission in Ottawa.

Stursberg joined Ernest Bushnell to apply for a license for what became CJOH Television in Ottawa. When the station was launched in 1961 he became a television newscaster and commentator for CJOH and was one of the early contributors to CTV National News. He remained a news commentator for CJOH and CTV until his retirement from broadcasting in 1973. He wrote several books on Diefenbaker and Lester Pearson: Diefenbaker: Leadership Gained, 1956-62 (1975) and Diefenbaker: Leadership Lost, 1962-67 (1976), Lester Pearson and the Dream of Unity (1978) and Lester Pearson and the American Dilemma (1980). In 1980, he joined the Department of Canadian Studies at Simon Fraser University as an Instructor and was an adjunct professor there from 1982 to 1988. In 1996, he was made a Member of the Order of Canada for having "helped Canadians to be better informed about themselves and their place in the world".

Stursberg's final book, No Foreign Bones in China (2002), details his family's complex relationship with his country of birth: "Stursberg recreated the story of his family in China for No Foreign Bones in China, recalling the turbulent birth of modern China through the Opium Wars, the Boxer Rebellion, two world wars and the rise of Mao. It traces the fortunes of Captain Samuel Lewis Shaw, a merchant seaman, who arrived in China in the 1830s. He settled in Fuzhou and married a Japanese woman, Peter Stursberg's grandmother, to whom the book is dedicated. The Shaw children grew up in Pagoda Anchorage, the heart of the Chinese tea trade. The title refers to the fury of the Chinese over the Korean War. They expelled all foreigners and even dug up their bones, including the bones of Stursberg's grandfather and grandmother."

Through his ancestors Captain Shaw and his Japanese wife, Stursberg is related to former British Conservative leader, Iain Duncan Smith.

Stursberg is the father of former CBC executive Richard Stursberg. His granddaughter, Trina Maus, is a news reporter for CTV. Stursberg died in 2014, on his 101st birthday, in Vancouver, British Columbia.

== Selected bibliography ==
- Journey Into Victory: Up the Alaska Highway and to Sicily and Italy (1944)
- Agreement in Principle (1961)
- Those Were The Days: Victoria in the 1930s (1969)
- Mister Broadcasting: The Ernie Bushnell Story (1971)
- Diefenbaker: Leadership Gained 1956-62, Toronto 1975, University of Toronto Press
- Diefenbaker: Leadership Lost 1962-67, Toronto 1976, University of Toronto Press
- — (1978). Lester Pearson and the Dream of Unity. Toronto/New York City: Doubleday Canada/Doubleday. ISBN 978-0-385-13478-1. OCLC 4516158.
- Lester Pearson and the American Dilemma (1980)
- EXTRA! When the Papers Had the Only News (1982)
- Gordon Shrum: An Autobiography with Peter Stursberg (1986)
- The Golden Hope: Christians In China (1987)
- Roland Michener, The Last Viceroy (1989)
- The Sound of War: Memoirs of a CBC Correspondent (1993)
- No Foreign Bones in China: Memoirs of Imperialism and Its Ending (2002)
