= Richard Stursberg =

Canadian entertainment executive

Richard Barclay Stursberg is a Canadian entertainment executive. He was executive vice president of CBC/Radio Canada from October 1, 2004 to August 6, 2010, narrated in his 2012 memoir The Tower of Babble.

== Life and career ==
Richard Stursberg was born in London, England and grew up in New York where his father was working as a United Nations correspondent. He is the son of Jessamy Anderson (née Robertson) and broadcaster/writer Peter Stursberg. His father was born in China of German, English, and Japanese descent. Stursberg has a master's degree from Carleton University.

Stursberg has more than 25 years' experience in the entertainment, broadcasting, cable, telecommunications, and cultural industries, including terms as head of the Canadian Cable Television Association from 1995 to 1999, Star Choice and Cancom from 1999 to 2001 and Telefilm Canada from 2001 to 2004.

Stursberg is a member of the executive committee of the Commonwealth Broadcasting Association. He has been a director of PEN Canada since 2015, and became president of the board in 2017.

In 2009, Stursberg married Carole MacNeil, a CBC news anchor.
