= Global Task Force for Public Media =

International association

- Groupe de travail mondial pour les médias publics

- Countries of the public broadcasters
- Formation: September 10, 2019
- Type: Association of public broadcasters
- Region served: North America, Europe, and Oceania
- Members: 7
- Chair: (Germany) Norbert Himmler
- Website: www.publicmediaalliance.org/global-task-force/

The Global Task Force for Public Media (French: Groupe de travail mondial pour les médias publics) is an international association of a working group of leaders from seven national public broadcasters formed in September 2019. It is currently chaired by Norbert Himmler, director-general of German public broadcaster ZDF.

The task force seeks to contribute to the public discourse on the issues and challenges facing public media such as financial pressure, competition for audience share in the digital market, and online disinformation. Its mandate is to defend the interests and values of public media on a global scale. Seven values are listed in its mission statement: access, accuracy, accountability, creativity, impartiality, independence and high standards of journalism.

== History ==
The task force was originally made up of public media leaders from Canada, Australia, Germany, France, the U.K., New Zealand and Sweden. Its membership was expanded in May 2020 to include Yang Sung-dong, president of South Korea's public broadcaster, KBS.

On February 19, 2020, Tait published an open letter in the Financial Times in support of the British, Australian and Danish public broadcasters, which had experienced funding and staff cuts and, in the case of ABC, been served with search warrants.

In April 2020, in response to the COVID-19 pandemic, the task force issued its first statement, in which it highlighted the services provided by its members and other public broadcasters to the citizens of their respective countries in a time of crisis. In July it published a statement in Le Monde condemning actions by various Eastern European governments that have curtailed the independence of public broadcasters in the region, including Trójka and Telewizja Polska in Poland, Radiotelevizija Slovenija in Slovenia, and Česká televize in the Czech Republic. The statement also criticised the decision by government authorities in Hong Kong to review the management and practices of RTHK, the local public broadcaster. In September, an English version of the statement was published in the Canadian newspaper The Hill Times.

On January 11, 2021, the task force published an op-ed in the Toronto Star condemning the growing threats to journalists’ safety, citing recent examples of CBC News reporters being assaulted in Washington, D.C., and Vancouver following the 2021 storming of the United States Capitol. The piece argues that a connection exists between disinformation, online violence and real-world abuse and attacks.

On February 13, 2021, the task force expressed concerns about the decision by Chinese authorities to ban BBC World News from broadcasting in mainland China and Hong Kong, saying the actions restrict access to trusted sources of news and media freedom within the region. In its statement, the task force described access to independent journalism as a basic right and critical for citizens everywhere to be informed.

As of December 2024, the task force was composed of David Anderson, managing director of ABC (Australia); Norbert Himmler, director general of ZDF (Germany); Delphine Ernotte, president and CEO of France Télévisions (France); Tim Davie, director general of the BBC (United Kingdom); Jim Mather, board chair of RNZ (New Zealand); Anne Lagercrantz, director general of SVT (Sweden); and Catherine Tait, president and CEO of CBC/Radio-Canada (Canada).
