= Tonight Kim Je-dong =

Tonight Kim Je-dong (Korean: 오늘밤 김제동) was a chat show programme on KBS1.

== History ==
Originally planned as Kim Je-dong The Live (김제동 더 라이브), it soon changed its name to Tonight Kim Je-dong. The purpose was to "explain the social issues in comprehensible ways". The programme started airing on 10 September 2018 and ended on 29 August 2019.

The programme faced various criticisms, as the MC Kim Je-dong is a controversial left-wing figure related to political bias. It was also projected in order to replace a long-live programme KBS News Line broadcast since 1994, but was criticised due to the low ratings. KBS was also criticised for paying too high performance fees to Kim, despite its low ratings.

On 4 December 2018, the programme broadcast an interview with Kim Soo-geun, a founder of the now-defunct Youth Party and the incumbent President of the Welcome to The Great, who praised Kim Jong Un during the interview session. The KBS Public Trade Union filed a lawsuit against Yang Seung-dong, the KBS President who projected the programme, and the in charges under the breach of the National Security Act. Na Kyung-won, the Liberty Korea parliamentary leader, urged its all MPs to not appear on the programme.
