= Registered third parties (Canada) =

In Canada, a registered third party is "a person or group that wants to participate in or influence elections other than as a political party, electoral district association, nomination contestant or candidate." Third parties register with Elections Canada and are regulated under the terms of the Canada Elections Act.

Third parties are subject to different regulations for campaign and pre-campaign periods. There are no limits to what a third party can spend on political advertising pre-campaign — spending rules are only in force once the writ is dropped and the campaign has officially begun. A person or group must register as a third party immediately after incurring election advertising expenses totalling $500 or more. There are strict limits on advertising expenses, as well as specific limits that can be incurred to promote or oppose the election of one or more candidates in a particular electoral district.

It is illegal for a third party and a registered political party or a candidate to collude with each other for the purpose of circumventing the maximum amount that a registered party is allowed for election expenses.

== Federal general elections ==
=== 2015 Election ===
Registered third parties

There were 112 registered third parties in the 2015 federal election: A partial list includes the following:

- Canadian Media Guild
- Canadian Medical Association
- Diane Babcock
- Dogwood Initiative
- Downtown Mission of Windsor Inc.
- Fair Vote Canada
- Friends of Canadian Broadcasting
- IATSE
- LeadNow
- Les Sans-Chemise (Conseil National des Chômeurs et Chômeuses, National Council of Unemployed People)
- UNIFOR
- Voters Against Harper

2015 Advertising Spending Limits

- Total election advertising expenses limit: $439,410.81
- Total election advertising expenses limit in a given electoral district: $8,788.22

=== 2011 Election ===
There were 55 registered third parties in the 2011 federal election:

- Ashraf Ali Rao
- Association of Canadian Community Colleges (ACCC)
- AVAAZ
- BC Health Coalition
- BCWF Political Action Alliance
- British Columbia Nurses' Union
- British Columbia Teachers' Federation
- Canadian Alliance of Student Associations
- Canadian Health Coalition
- Canadian Labour Congress
- Canadian Multicultural Association
- Canadian Shooting Sports Association
- Canadian Union of Public Employees
- Canadian Wheat Board Alliance
- Canadians Defending Democracy
- Canadians Rising Up For Democracy
- Catch 22 Campaign
- Catholic Civil Rights League
- CAW-Canada
- Child Care Advocacy Association of Canada (CCAAC)
- Citizens for Truth in Politics
- CMI – ICM Canadian Migration Institute
- Coalition for Gun Control
- Coalition of Child Care Advocates of BC
- Communications, Energy and Paperworkers Union of Canada (CEP)
- Conservation Voters of BC
- Council of Senior Citizens' Organizations of British Columbia
- Dogwood Initiative
- Elizabeth Will Group
- End Racism Now
- Friends of Canadian Broadcasting
- Gesher Canada
- Immigration Practitioners and Academics for a Just Immigration Policy
- International Fund for Animal Welfare Inc. (IFAW)
- International Association of Machinists and Aerospace Workers
- John W. Fossey
- Kam-Wing Chiu
- Les Sans-Chemise
- Matilda Wong
- National Citizens Coalition
- Project Democracy
- Public Service Alliance of Canada
- Richmond Watch
- Save Our Prison Farms
- Smart Tax Alliance – BC
- Society of Professional Engineers and Associates (SPEA)
- Sport Fishing Institute of BC
- The Council of Canadians
- The Professional Institute of the Public Service of Canada
- UFCW Canada
- Vancouver Fire Fighters' Union Local 18
- Whip Harper
- Wong John Gok Git
- Yee Lai Leung
- Yik-Lan Lo
