= Louis Lalande =

- Occupation: television executive
- Known for: Executive Vice President of Société Radio-Canada
- Predecessor: Sylvain Lafrance

Louis Lalande is the current executive vice president of French language services at Société Radio-Canada. Lalande was appointed on January 16, 2012, after serving as interim, since September 16, 2011.

Lalande has been with SRC for thirty years in news and current affairs, and ten years as an executive producer of special coverage and major events including as elections. Lalande later went on to become executive director of technical production, then executive director of news and current affairs for Télévision de Radio-Canada. Lalande was also involved in establishing the Centre de l'information in Montreal, where he was the News and Current Affairs Director for Télévision de Radio-Canada and Réseau de l'information for more than two years, after having been executive director of Technical Production. Lalande also established Le Canal Nouvelles and was executive producer of Le Point.

Lalande succeeded Sylvain Lafrance.
