= William T. Armstrong =

Canadian civil servant

William T. (Bill) Armstrong (May 17, 1929 – March 25, 2005) was president of the Canadian Broadcasting Corporation from August to October 1989 following the retirement of Pierre Juneau. He served within CBC for 33 years and retired in 1992. His career was diverse and extensive:

- Supervisor of Information 1958-1959
- Director of Information Services 1959-1966
- Director of Corporate Relations 1967-1969
- Director, Ottawa Area 1969 to 1973
- Vice-President, Public Relations at Head Office 1973 to 1975
- Managing Director of Radio 1975-1979
- Assistant general manager, CBC English Services 1979-1981
- General manager of Roy Thomson Hall 1981-1982
- Executive vice-president of CBC/Radio-Canada 1982 to 1989
- Regional Director for CBC Ontario 1989-1992

Government offices
Preceded by Pierre Juneau	President of the Canadian Broadcasting Corporation; 1989	Succeeded by Gérard Veilleux
