= Robert Rabinovitch =

Canadian civil servant

President and CEO of the Canadian Broadcasting Corporation
- In office 1999–2007
- Preceded by: Perrin Beatty
- Succeeded by: Hubert Lacroix

Under-Secretary of State for Canada
- In office 1985–1986
- Preceded by: Huguette Labelle
- Succeeded by: Jean Fournier

Deputy Minister of Communications
- In office 1982–1985
- Preceded by: Pierre Juneau
- Succeeded by: de Montigny Marchand

Personal details
- Born: March 1, 1943 (age 83)
- Education: McGill University; University of Pennsylvania

Robert Rabinovitch (born March 1, 1943) is a Canadian public servant and businessman who was President and Chief Executive Officer of the Canadian Broadcasting Corporation from 1999 to 2007.

== Biography ==
A graduate of the Desautels Faculty of Management at McGill University and the Wharton School of the University of Pennsylvania, he holds an M.A. and a Ph.D. in Economics and Finance. He was a member of the Board of Governors of McGill University from 1997 to 2009, serving as Chair from 1999 to 2006. In 2003, Rabinovitch was awarded an honorary doctor of laws degree by York University in recognition of his public service.

Rabinovitch has held positions in both the public and private sectors. He worked for the Government of Canada from 1968 to 1986, serving as Undersecretary of State from January 1985 to September 1986 and Deputy Minister of Communications from 1982 to 1985. He also held several positions within the Privy Council Office, including Deputy Secretary to the Cabinet and Senior Assistant Secretary to the Cabinet for Priorities and Planning.

While serving as head of the CBC, Rabinovitch ordered the lockout of 5,500 unionized employees in 2005, leading to a two-month labour struggle between the Crown corporation and the Canadian Media Guild.

Prior to his appointment as head of the CBC, Rabinovitch had served as Executive Vice-President and Chief Operating Officer of Claridge Inc., a Bronfman family holding company. He has been a member of a number of corporate boards, including Cineplex Odeon and NetStar Communications. He was also a member of the federal government's Direct-to-Home Satellite Broadcasting Policy Review Panel.

Rabinovitch has been active with the Canadian Executive Service Organization, the CRB Foundation, The Samuel and Saidye Bronfman Family Foundation and the Canadian Film Centre. He served as Chairman of the Executive Committee of the Canadian Jewish Congress (Québec) until his appointment to the CBC.

Preceded by Perrin Beatty	President of the Canadian Broadcasting Corporation; 1999–2007	Succeeded by Hubert Lacroix
