= Yang Seung-dong =

South Korean journalist

President of the Korean Broadcasting System
- In office 9 April 2018 – 9 December 2021
- Preceded by: Goh Dae-young
- Succeeded by: Kim Eui-chul

Personal details
- Born: 15 July 1961 (age 65) Gongju, South Korea
- Education: Korea University
- Occupation: Journalist

Korean name
- Hangul: 양승동
- RR: Yang Seungdong
- MR: Yang Sŭngdong

Yang Seung-dong (Korean: 양승동; born 15 July 1961) is a South Korean journalist. He served as the 23rd and 24th President of the Korean Broadcasting System (KBS).

== Career ==
Born in Gongju, Yang was educated at Kimin Secondary School and Daejeon High School. He earned a bachelor's degree in political science and international relations, as well as a master's degree in international politics from Korea University.

Yang was hired to KBS as a producer of the Issue and Culture Department in 1989, and directed TV programmes such as KBS Special, Good Insight, History Special, In Depth 60 Minutes and so on. In 2007, he served as the President of Korean Producers and Directors Association and KBS Producers and Directors Association, and as the Organisation and Production Director of KBS Busan in 2013.

In 2008, Yang was one of the co-presidents of the KBS Employees Action to Defend Public Broadcasting (shortly Employees Action), an organisation fighting against the media control of the President of the Republic, Lee Myung-bak. The organisation also aimed to protect the incumbent KBS President Chung Yeon-joo from dismissal. After Lee Byung-soon replaced Chung, Yang was sacked from KBS, but filed an appeal so that the punishment was eased to 4-month suspension. He was assigned to the Non-production Department for 2 years.

On 5 February 2018, almost a year after Moon Jae-in and the Democratic Party of Korea came to power, Yang announced his bid for KBS presidency after considering for a month. According to an interview with Media Today, he explained that one of his juniors advised him to take the office. He also added that KBS, as a public broadcasting, should be independent from bureaucrats and capitals, citing examples of JTBC and MBC. On 26 February, Yang was formally chosen as the sole presidential candidate for KBS. The decision was subsequently endorsed by National Union of Mediaworkers KBS (shortly KBS New Trade Union). On 6 April, he was officially appointed by the President of the Republic Moon Jae-in, though he failed to pass the National Assembly hearing process, in which the Liberty Korea Party opposed his appointment.

On 31 October 2018, Yang was re-elected for his office, after passing an interview of KBS board of directors and citizens' advisories. His inauguration was held on 12 December 2018. In his capacity as President of KBS, Yang has also been a member of the Global Task Force for Public Media, an initiative of the Public Media Alliance, since May 2020.

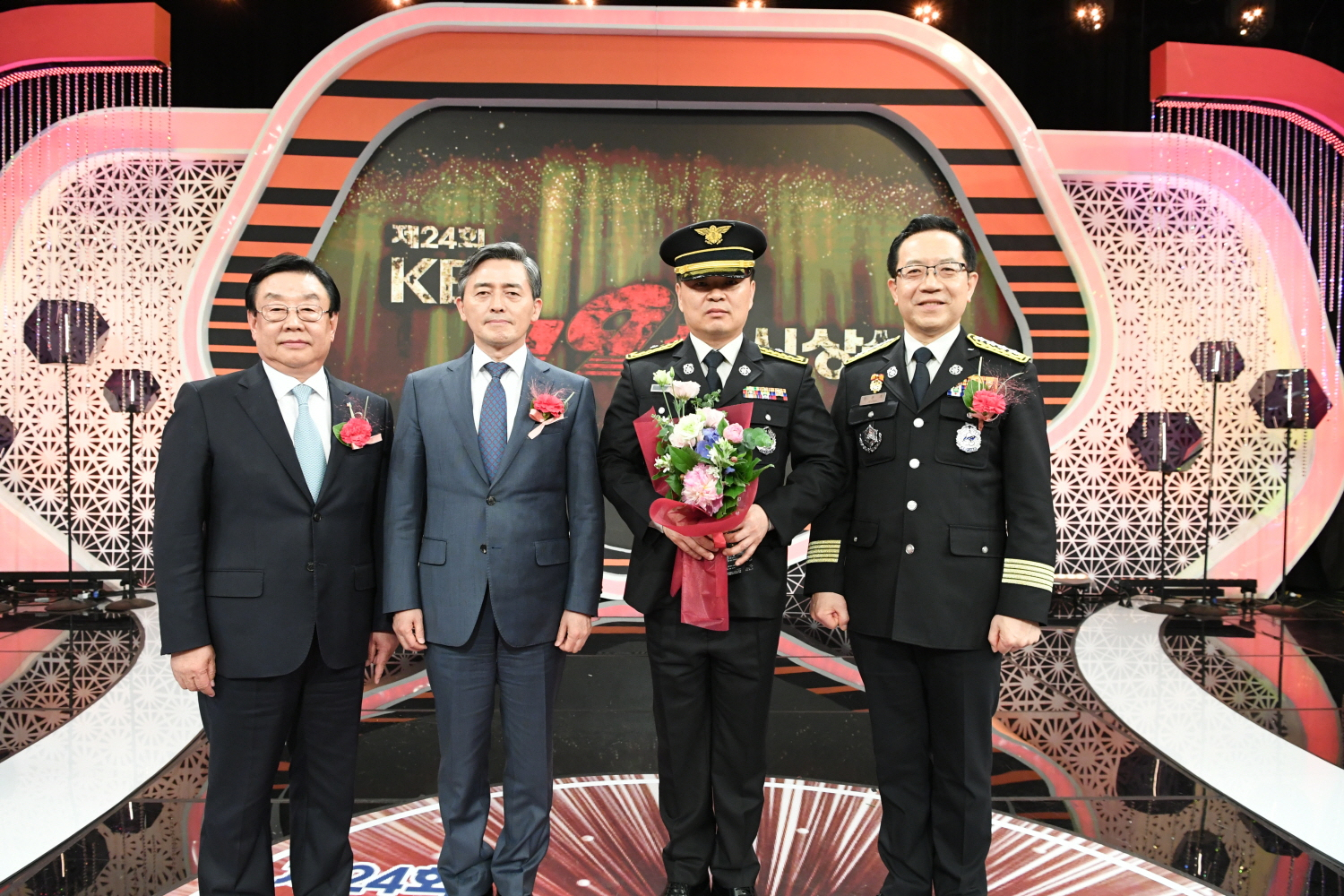
20190423제24회 KBS119상 시상식6(KBS 사장 양승동 소방청장 정문호)

== Controversies ==
=== Sewol tragedy karaoke incident ===
On 30 March 2018, during the parliamentary hearing session, a Liberty Korea MP Park Dae-chool said that he received a report, which Yang was at a karaoke in Haeundae on 16 April 2014, the day of the MV Sewol tragedy. Yang at first denied it, but soon Park revealed a statement describing that Yang purchased at a karaoke via KBS credit card on the day of the tragedy. Another Liberty Korea MP, Min Kyung-wook, criticised, "Although he did not breach the law, he kept denying the facts. It means that he disdained the Parliament." In the end, Yang finally apologised.

=== End of long-lived programmes ===
Yang was widely criticised for ending several long-lived programmes, such as KBS TV Novel (1987–2018), KBS News Line (1994–2018), Viewers Column The World We Live In (1998–2018), VJ's on the scene (2000–2018), Smart Consumer Report (2007–2018), and so on.

Controversies were provoked when KBS decided to end Concert 7080 (2004–2018) but did not explain the actual reason. Sunday Journal, a US-based Korean newspaper called the action as the "media control of the Moon Jae-in administration worse than the Lee Myung-bak and Park Geun-hye". The newspaper also criticised that the new programmes i.e. Tonight Kim Je-dong and Your Red Cheek have low ratings than the old ones.

=== Tonight Kim Je-dong ===
Yang has also been criticised for Tonight Kim Je-dong, a new programme organised under his presidency. Sunday Journal cited that Kim Je-dong, the programme's emcee, receives high performance fees despite its low ratings.

On 4 December 2018, the programme broadcast an interview with Kim Soo-geun, a founder of the now-defunct Youth Party and the incumbent President of the Welcome to The Great, who praised Kim Jong Un during the interview session. The KBS Public Trade Union filed a lawsuit against Yang and the in charges under the breach of the National Security Act. Na Kyung-won, the Liberty Korea parliamentary leader, urged its all MPs to not appear on the programme.

== Filmography ==
- KBS Special
- Good Insight
- History Special
- In Depth 60 Minutes
- Man History
- World Report
