= Catherine Tait =

16th president of the Canadian Broadcasting Corporation

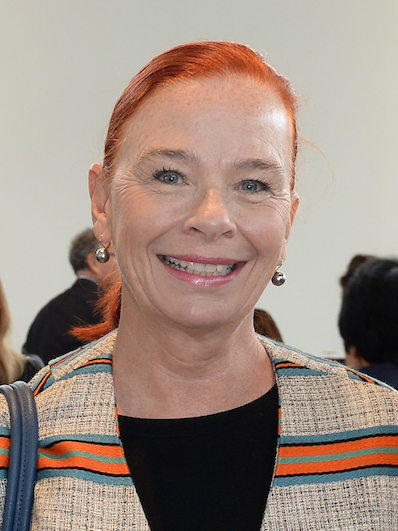
- Tait at the CFC's Annual fundraiser, 2018

16th President of the Canadian Broadcasting Corporation
- In office July 3, 2018 – January 3, 2025
- Preceded by: Hubert Lacroix
- Succeeded by: Marie-Philippe Bouchard

1st Chair of the Global Task Force for Public Media
- In office September 10, 2019 – December 19, 2024
- Preceded by: Position established
- Succeeded by: Norbert Himmler

Personal details
- Born: 1958 (age 67–68) Athens, Attica, Greece
- Education: University of Toronto (BA); Boston University (MS); University of Paris II Panthéon-Assas (DEA)
- Occupation: Business executive

Catherine Tait (born 1958) is a Canadian business executive who formerly served as the 16th president of the Canadian Broadcasting Corporation. She succeeded Hubert Lacroix for the position after being appointed on April 3, 2018, and beginning her five-year mandate on July 3, 2018. In June 2023, her mandate was renewed until January 2025. She was succeeded by former TV5 Québec Canada chief executive officer, Marie-Philippe Bouchard.

Tait was a founder and served as the first chair of the Global Task Force for Public Media, an initiative of the Public Media Alliance launched in September 2019. On December 19, 2024, she was succeeded in this role by ZDF Director-General Norbert Himmler.

== Education ==
Catherine Tait holds a Bachelor of Arts degree in literature and philosophy from the University of Toronto, a Master of Science degree in public communications from Boston University, and a Diplôme d’Études Approfondies degree in communications theory from the University of Paris II Panthéon-Assas.

== Career ==
=== Media and culture industry ===
Prior to joining CBC/Radio-Canada, Catherine Tait had worked in film and television production in Canada and the U.S. for more than three decades.

She served as a manager of Policy and Planning at Telefilm Canada in the 1980s, before going on to become Director and Cultural Attaché with the Canadian Cultural Centre in France from 1989 to 1991.

In Canada, Tait was president and COO of Salter Street Films from 1997 to 2001, producing such shows as the long-running CBC comedy This Hour Has 22 Minutes.

In 2002, she and film producer Liz Manne co-founded New York–based Duopoly Inc., an independent film, television and digital content company. Tait served as president until 2018. She also co-founded digital content provider iThentic in 2006.

=== President and CEO, CBC/Radio-Canada ===
Catherine Tait presented her vision for the public broadcaster in May 2019, with the unveiling of the Corporation’s new strategic plan, Your Stories, Taken to Heart. The plan covers five priorities: global reach, digital, kids content, regions and diversity.

In a speech to the Montreal Chamber of Commerce, Tait described how taking Canada to the world was the “spearhead” of CBC/Radio-Canada’s strategic plan, in order to counter the competitive threat of the digital giants. Since being appointed Chair of the Global Task Force for Public Media in September 2019, Tait has signed collaboration agreements (co-development and content sharing) between CBC/Radio-Canada and other public broadcasters around the world, such as the ABC, the BBC, France Télévisions, ZDF and RTBF. In 2023, with ZDF, RTBF and SRG SSR as international partners, CBC/Radio-Canada launched the Public Spaces Incubator (PSI), a digital incubator to develop online tools to facilitate respectful online discourse. ARD and ABC joined PSI in 2024.

As part of the public broadcaster’s ongoing digital transformation, in September 2018, Tait announced a new streaming service, CBC Gem, at Content Canada, an industry event in collaboration with the Toronto International Film Festival. The service launched in December 2018. Under her leadership, two new audio apps were developed – CBC Listen and Radio-Canada OHdio – providing a one-stop destination for all the public broadcaster’s audio content (music, podcasts and radio shows). Both apps were launched in fall 2019.

At the international Kidscreen Summit in February 2019, Tait committed to expanding the public broadcaster’s kids content offering, especially on CBC Gem. During her tenure, the Corporation also launched two news services for kids 13 and under: CBC Kids News in 2018 and MAJ (Mon actualité du jour) in 2019.

In an interview with CBC/Radio-Canada reporters in Saskatchewan, Tait said she wanted to move more production to regional centres, particularly for radio and digital. This strategic priority has resulted in CBC stepping up its pop-up bureau approach at locations such as Stanley Mission, Saskatchewan; Winkler and Morden, Manitoba; northeast Calgary; and the Tsuut’ina First Nation in Alberta. CBC has also increased production outside Toronto, with the national radio show Cost of Living and the podcast West of Centre both being produced out of Calgary. The public broadcaster’s French-language network, Radio-Canada, has added new videojournalists in Yellowknife and Iqaluit to cover the North, as well as a more mobile workforce at its Abitibi-Témiscamingue station.

In 2019, Tait was criticized for allegedly likening Netflix's influence to cultural imperialism in India and parts of Africa. She said "There was a time when cultural imperialism was absolutely accepted. Fast forward to what happens after imperialism and the damage that can do to local communities. So all I would say is, let us be mindful of how it is we as Canadians respond to global companies coming into our country." TV critic John Doyle responded: "CBC Television’s weakness is its commitment to ordinary, middling-good TV, and it has become complacent about middling success."

In June 2023, Tait's contract was renewed with a shortened mandate while a successor would be found.

In December 2023, Tait announced a CA$125 million budget shortfall for the 2024-2025 fiscal year, and notified the public that 10% of CBC staff would likely lose their jobs due to cut backs. Tait was eventually summoned to a House of Commons committee to answer questions related to the executives performance pay. In April 2024, after receiving an additional CA$42 million from the federal government, Tait said that significant job cuts were no longer needed. Tait's performance pay is determined by the federal government, following a review by the board of directors. After CBC/Radio-Canada paid out $18.4 million in performance pay to nearly 1,200 employees for the 2023-2024 fiscal year, the federal government would not disclose if Tait had received one, but a spokesman stated Tait had not received any performance pay for two years.

On October 22, 2024, it was announced that Marie-Philippe Bouchard, president and CEO of TV5 Québec Canada, would succeed Tait as president for a five-year term, effective January 3, 2025.

Preceded by Hubert Lacroix	President of the Canadian Broadcasting Corporation; 2018–present	Incumbent
