= Gérard Veilleux =

Gérard Veilleux, OC (born 1942) was president of the Canadian Broadcasting Corporation from 1989 to 1993. He became president of Power Communications in 1994.

Born in East Broughton, Quebec, he received a Bachelor of Commerce degree in 1963 from Université Laval and a Master of Public Administration degree in 1968 from Carleton University.

Veilleux was a career public servant:

- Director General, Federal-Provincial Relations, Quebec Department of Intergovernmental Affairs, during October Crisis.
- Assistant Deputy Minister, Department of National Health and Welfare
- Assistant Deputy Minister, Federal-Provincial Relations and Social Policy, Department of Finance
- Associate Deputy Minister, Ministry of State for Economic Development
- Deputy Clerk of the Privy Council
- Secretary to the Cabinet for Federal-Provincial Relations
- Secretary of the Treasury Board

== Memberships ==
- Institute for Research on Public Policy
- Board of Governors of McGill University
- National Gallery of Canada Foundation
- Chairperson of the Canada Millennium Scholarship Foundation

He is a winner of the Outstanding Achievement Award, the Public Service of Canada's highest honour. In 1995, he was made an Officer of the Order of Canada.

Government offices
Preceded by William T. Armstrong	President of the Canadian Broadcasting Corporation; 1989–1993	Succeeded by Anthony S. Manera
