= Anthony S. Manera =

Anthony (Tony) Manera was President of the Canadian Broadcasting Corporation (CBC) from 1993 to 1995. He joined the CBC as Vice-President of Human Resources in 1985 and was appointed Senior Vice President in 1986. He resigned from the Presidency of the CBC in 1995 with almost four years left in his mandate as a protest against government cuts to the Corporation.

After his departure from the CBC, he established an international consulting practice in broadcasting, the performing arts, human resources, higher education, management, and governance. Some of his clients were the Canadian Public Service Commission, the Telelatino Television Network, the Polish Broadcasting Council, and the National Arts Centre. His interests include classical music, gardening, reading, and writing. His opinion pieces have been published in several leading Canadian publications. His textbook "Solid State Electronic Circuits" was published in 1973 by McGraw-Hill Book Co. (NY, NY) and has been used by colleges and universities, research laboratories, corporations, and military academies around the world.

Manera was born in Italy in 1940 and emigrated to Canada with his parents in 1951. From 1953 to 1958 he worked in office jobs in Montreal. From 1958 to 1965 he lived in Los Angeles, where he studied engineering while working as a waiter (1958 to 1962), and as an electronics technician (Hughes Aircraft 1962-63).

He earned a Bachelor of Science (BSc) degree in Electronics Engineering from Northrop University in 1963 and a Master of Science (MSc) degree in Electrical Engineering from the University of Southern California in 1965.

He worked as an electronics engineer (Teledyne Systems 1963-64), and as a professor of engineering and mathematics (Northrop University 1964-65). From 1965 to 1967 he taught electronics at Ryerson Polytechnical Institute in Toronto. From 1967 to 1968 he was the engineering technology coordinator at Sir Sandford Fleming College in Peterborough, Ontario. From 1968 to 1971 he served as Dean of Technology at Confederation College in Thunder Bay, Ontario. He served as President of Niagara College from 1972 to 1978 and as President of Vancouver Community College from 1978 to 1985.

He was a member of the board of governors at the Ottawa Hospital, the Ottawa Public Library, and Opera Lyra Ottawa, as well as numerous other boards of directors in broadcasting, education, health care, the performing arts, and public service sectors. In 1995 he was awarded an Honorary Membership in the Ontario Association of Certified Engineering Technicians and Technologists, in recognition of his many years of support to technological education.

Government offices
Preceded by Gérard Veilleux	President of the Canadian Broadcasting Corporation; 1993–1995	Succeeded by Perrin Beatty
