= Canadian Media Guild =

Trade union

- Guilde Canadienne des Médias
- Abbreviation: CMG
- Type: Local union
- Headquarters: Toronto, Ontario, Canada
- Location: Canada
- Members: 6,000
- Official languages: English; French
- President: Annick Forest
- Parent organization: Communications Workers of America
- Website: cmg.ca

The Canadian Media Guild (CMG) is a trade union representing employees at the Canadian Broadcasting Corporation (outside Quebec and Moncton, New Brunswick), the Canadian Press, Thomson Reuters, Agence France-Presse, the Aboriginal Peoples Television Network, Corus Entertainment, CJRC Radio in Gatineau, Que., TVOntario and ZoomerMedia.

It is a local of the NewsGuild-CWA and is the largest media local union in North America. It was formerly known as The Canadian Wire Service Guild and was created in 1950 by employees of The Canadian Press. It expanded to CBC news writers, who carried it after a union decertification campaign at The Canadian Press succeeded. CP employees rejoined and won a contract in 1976. The guild, as it has always been known, increased in size from about 700 to more than 3,000 in 1993 when CUPE and ACTRA members at the CBC voted to join. It adopted its current name in 1994. Four years later another 400 CUPE members joined the guild and, in 2003, CBC technicians, formerly represented by the Communications, Energy and Paperworkers Union of Canada, became part of CMG in a consolidation vote.

It is part of Ottawa-based CWA/SCA Canada, which is the Canadian arm of the 700,000-member Communications Workers of America, and also includes newspapers such as the Victoria Times Colonist, Montreal Gazette and Ottawa Citizen.

In recent history, on August 15, 2005, the Canadian Broadcasting Corporation locked out its 5,500 members in the Canadian Media Guild. The key point of contention was the broadcaster's insistence on more temporary contracts in the future while guaranteeing no change in employment status for existing employees. The dispute lasted eight weeks and ended with both sides compromising on this point.

In August 2015, the Canadian Media Guild, became a registered third party in order to speak up for better funding for the national public broadcaster, more transparency in the appointment process for the President & CEO of CBC/Radio-Canada and its board of directors, and for CBC/Radio-Canada's arm's-length relationship and independence from the government of the day.

== See also ==
- List of NewsGuild-CWA Locals
