= Hubert Lacroix =

Canadian lawyer (born 1955)

- Born: July 13, 1955 (age 71); Montreal, Quebec, Canada
- Education: Collège Jean-de-Brébeuf; McGill University
- Occupations: Former President & CEO of Canadian Broadcasting Corporation; Lawyer

Hubert T. Lacroix (born July 13, 1955) is a Canadian lawyer who served as the 15th President and CEO of the Canadian Broadcasting Corporation (CBC), the national public radio and television broadcaster, from 2008 until 2018.

Born in Montreal, Quebec, Lacroix attended Collège Jean-de-Brébeuf before receiving a Bachelor of Law degree from the McGill University Faculty of Law in 1976. He was admitted to the Quebec Bar in 1977 and received a master of Business Administration from McGill's Desautels Faculty of Management in 1981. He started practising law with the firm of O'Brien, Hall, Saunders in 1977.

A senior adviser with the law firm Stikeman Elliott LLP, he was Executive Chairman of Telemedia Corporation from 2000 to 2003. He was a member of the Board of Directors of Zarlink Semiconductors between 1992 and 2011. He also sat on the Boards of Donohue Inc., Circo Craft Co. Inc., Adventure Electronics Inc. and Michelin Canada Inc.

Lacroix is an associate professor with the Faculty of Law at Université de Montréal where he teaches in the securities, and mergers and acquisitions. He was a basketball colour commentator on Télévision de Radio-Canada during the 1984, 1988, and 1996 Summer Olympics. He was also a weekly contributor for Radio-Canada's Hebdo-Sports radio show. His recent time in the Oasis Montreal Half-Marathon was 1:32:41.0.

He was appointed president and CEO of the CBC, effective January 1, 2008, by Governor General Michaëlle Jean in November 2007 replacing Robert Rabinovitch. Lacroix was re-appointed for a second term, on October 5, 2012. He left the position in 2018 and was succeeded by Catherine Tait.

Preceded by Robert Rabinovitch	President of the Canadian Broadcasting Corporation; 2008–2018	Succeeded by Catherine Tait
