= Canadian Broadcasting Corporation =

Canadian public broadcaster

Canadian Broadcasting Corporation Société Radio-Canada

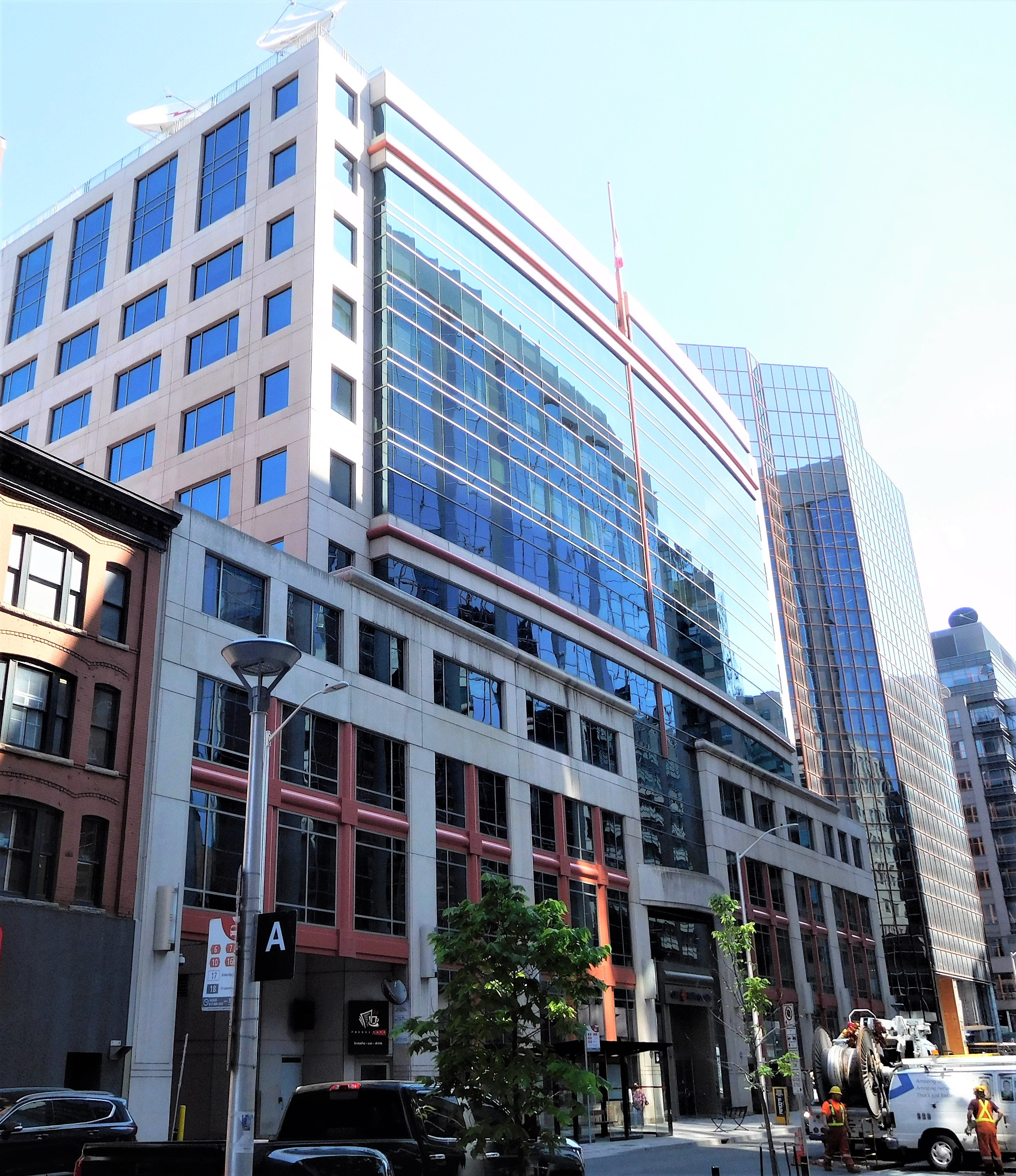
- CBC Headquarters in Ottawa, 2019
- Type: Crown corporation
- Industry: Mass media; Public broadcasting; Radio; Television; Digital media
- Predecessor: Canadian Radio Broadcasting Commission
- Founded: November 2, 1936; 90 years ago (radio); September 6, 1952; 74 years ago (television)
- Headquarters: CBC Ottawa Production Centre, Ottawa, Ontario, Canada
- Area served: National; available on terrestrial and cable systems in northern American border communities; available internationally via Internet, SiriusXM and on TV
- Key people: Michael Goldbloom (Chair); Marie-Philippe Bouchard (CEO); Barbara Williams (EVP English Networks); Dany Meloul (EVP French Networks)
- Products: Television; Radio; Digital media
- Services: CBC Television; Ici Radio-Canada Télé; CBC Radio; CBC News; CBC.ca; Radio-Canada.ca
- Revenue: ▼CA$515.84 million ($1.907 billion including public funding) (2023)
- Operating income: ▼CA$−127.608 million (2023)
- Net income: ▼CA$−125.109 million (2023)
- Number of employees: 9,429 (2023)
- Canadian Broadcasting Corporation

Corporation overview
- Minister responsible: Marc Miller, Minister of Canadian Identity and Culture
- Key document: Broadcasting Act, 1991
- Website: cbc.ca

The Canadian Broadcasting Corporation (French: Société Radio-Canada), branded as CBC/Radio-Canada, is the Canadian public broadcaster for both radio and television. It is a Crown corporation that serves as the national public broadcaster, with its English-language and French-language service units known as CBC and Radio-Canada, respectively.

Although some local stations in Canada predate its founding, the CBC is the oldest continually-existing broadcasting network in Canada. The CBC was established on November 2, 1936. The CBC operates four terrestrial radio networks: The English-language CBC Radio One and CBC Music, and the French-language Ici Radio-Canada Première and Ici Musique (international radio service Radio Canada International historically transmitted via shortwave radio, but since 2012 its content is only available as podcasts on its website). The CBC also operates two terrestrial television networks, the English-language CBC Television and the French-language Ici Radio-Canada Télé, along with the satellite/cable networks CBC News Network, Ici RDI, Ici Explora, Documentary Channel (partial ownership), and Ici ARTV. The CBC operates services for the Canadian Arctic under the names CBC North, and Radio-Canada Nord. The CBC also operates digital services including CBC.ca/Ici.Radio-Canada.ca, CBC Radio 3, CBC Music/ICI.mu, and Ici.TOU.TV.

CBC/Radio-Canada offers programming in English, French, and eight indigenous languages on its domestic radio service, and in five languages on its web-based international radio service, Radio Canada International (RCI). However, budget cuts in the early 2010s have contributed to the corporation reducing its service via the airwaves, discontinuing RCI's shortwave broadcasts as well as terrestrial television broadcasts in all communities served by network-owned rebroadcast transmitters, including communities not subject to Canada's over-the-air digital television transition.

The CBC's funding is supplemented by revenue from commercial advertising on its television broadcasts. The radio service employed commercials from its inception to 1974, but since then its primary radio networks have been commercial-free. In 2013, the CBC's secondary radio networks, CBC Music and Ici Musique, introduced limited advertising of up to four minutes an hour, but this was discontinued in 2016.

== History ==
The origins of the Canadian Broadcasting Corporation lie in debates during the 1920s over whether Canadian broadcasting should develop primarily as a private commercial system, as in the United States, or as a publicly controlled system influenced by the British model. A central concern was the growing reach of American radio stations and networks into Canada, particularly as many Canadian listeners could receive powerful U.S. signals more easily than domestic programming.

In 1929, the Royal Commission on Radio Broadcasting, commonly known as the Aird Commission, recommended the creation of a national public broadcasting system. Its report called for broadcasting to be treated as a public service and proposed a national body that would regulate broadcasting and operate its own stations and programs. Graham Spry and Alan Plaunt, through the Canadian Radio League, campaigned for implementation of the Aird recommendations and argued that public broadcasting was necessary to preserve Canadian control over the airwaves.

At the same time, railway broadcasting had already shown that radio could be organized on a national scale. Canadian National Railways had developed CNR Radio between 1923 and 1932, using railway telegraph lines, owned stations and leased airtime to provide programming for passengers and, incidentally, for the wider public within range of its transmitters. Its private-sector rival, the Canadian Pacific Railway, applied in January 1930 for licences for a proposed coast-to-coast radio network, but did not build the system as planned. Instead, Canadian Pacific Radio operated the Toronto phantom station CHRY, later CPRY, from studios at the Royal York Hotel, using leased transmitter time on existing Toronto stations with programming distributed to as many as 21 independent stations across Canada. Some programs were also carried by WJZ in New York and by its associated network in the eastern United States. The economic pressures of the Great Depression limited CPR's ability to develop a rival network, and its radio operations ended in 1935.

In 1932, the government of R. B. Bennett established the Canadian Radio Broadcasting Commission (CRBC), the CBC's immediate predecessor. The CRBC was given authority both to operate broadcasting services and to regulate broadcasting in Canada. In 1933, the commission acquired CNR Radio's broadcasting facilities, including CNR-owned stations, studios and related equipment, for $50,000.

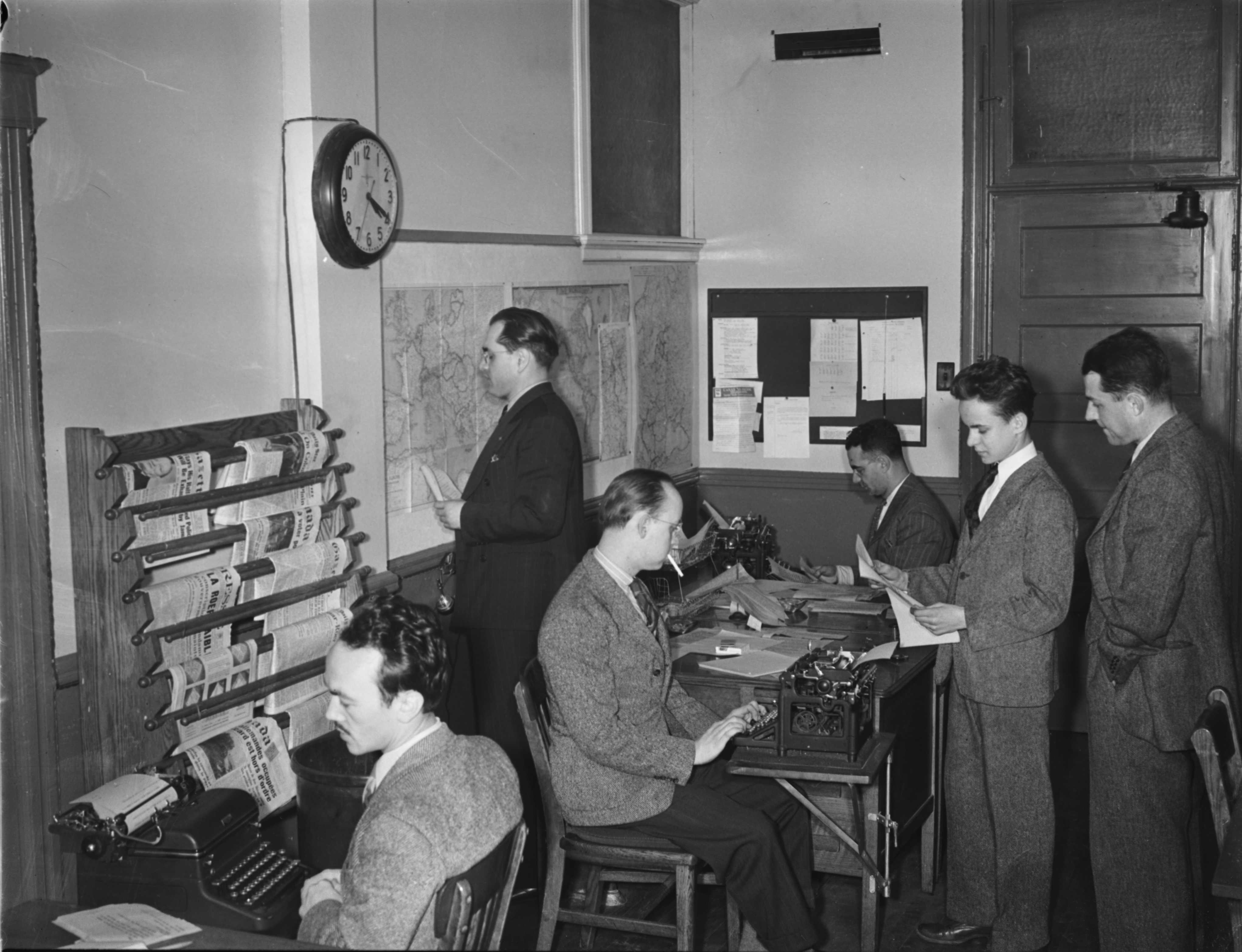
Journalists in a CBC newsroom in Montreal in November 1944

The CRBC was replaced by the Canadian Broadcasting Corporation on 2 November 1936, when the Canadian Broadcasting Act came into force. The new corporation inherited the CRBC's stations, network arrangements and regulatory responsibilities, but was reorganized as a Crown corporation with a board of governors. Leonard Brockington was elected the CBC's first chairman, with Gladstone Murray as general manager and Augustin Frigon as assistant general manager.

During its early years, the CBC combined its roles as broadcaster and regulator. It expanded national radio coverage through a mixture of owned stations, leased facilities and private affiliates, while also regulating private broadcasters. In December 1937, it established a separate French-language radio network. The CBC remained Canada's broadcasting regulator until 1958, when regulatory authority was transferred to the newly created Board of Broadcast Governors.

=== Frontier Coverage Package ===
Starting in 1967 and continuing until the mid-1970s, the CBC offered a "Frontier Coverage Package" of limited television service to remote northern communities. Low-power television transmitters carried a four-hour selection of black-and-white videotaped programs each day. The tapes were recorded in Calgary and flown into a community with a transmitter, put on the air, and then transported to another community, often by the "bicycle" method used in television syndication. Transportation delays ranged from one week for larger centres to almost a month for small communities.

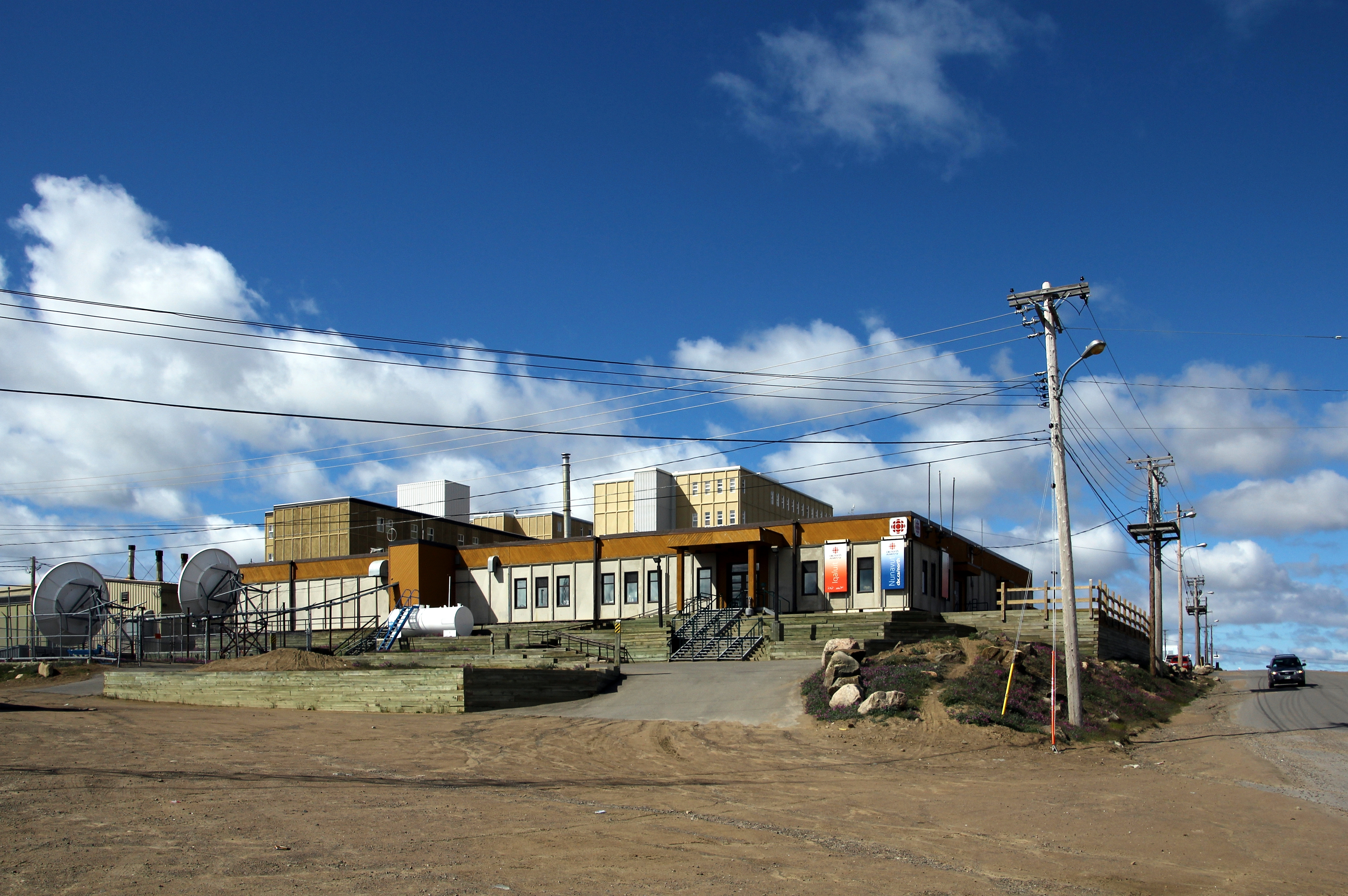
CBC North studios in Iqaluit in 2011

The first stations were started in Yellowknife, Northwest Territories; Lynn Lake, Manitoba; and Havre-Saint-Pierre, Quebec, in 1967. Another station began operating in Whitehorse, Yukon in November 1968. Additional stations were added from 1969 to 1972.

Most of the stations were reconfigured in 1973 to receive CBC Television programming from the Anik satellite in colour and live with the rest of Canada. Those serving the largest centres signed on with colour broadcasts on February 5, 1973, and most of the others were added before spring of that year. Broadcasts were geared to either the Atlantic Time Zone (UTC−4 or −3), originating from Halifax and later St. John's, or the Pacific Time Zone (UTC−8 or −7), originating from Vancouver, even though the audience resided in communities in time zones varying from UTC−5 to UTC−8; the reason for this was that the CBC originated its programs for the Atlantic Time Zone, and a key station in each time zone would record the broadcast for the appropriate delay of one, two or three hours; the programs were originated again for the Pacific zone. The northern stations picked up one of these two feeds, with the western NWT stations picking up the Pacific feed. Some in northern areas of the provinces were connected by microwave to a CBC broadcast centre within their own province.

Some of these stations used non-CBC call signs such as CFWH-TV in Whitehorse, CFYK in Yellowknife, CFFB in Frobisher Bay and CHAK in Inuvik, while some others used the standard CB_T callsign but with five letters (e.g. CBDHT). Uplinks in the North were usually a temporary unit brought in from the south. A ground station uplink was later established in Yellowknife, and then in Whitehorse and Iqaluit.

Television programs originating in the North began in 1979 with the monthly news magazine Our Ways, produced in Yellowknife, and graduated to half-hour newscasts (Northbeat and Igalaaq) on weekdays in 1995. Until then, there were occasional temporary uplinks for such things as territorial election returns coverage; Yukon had the first such coverage in 1985, though because it happened during the Stanley Cup playoffs, equipment was already spoken for, so CBC rented the equipment of CITV-TV Edmonton to use in Whitehorse that evening.

=== 2011 transition to digital television ===
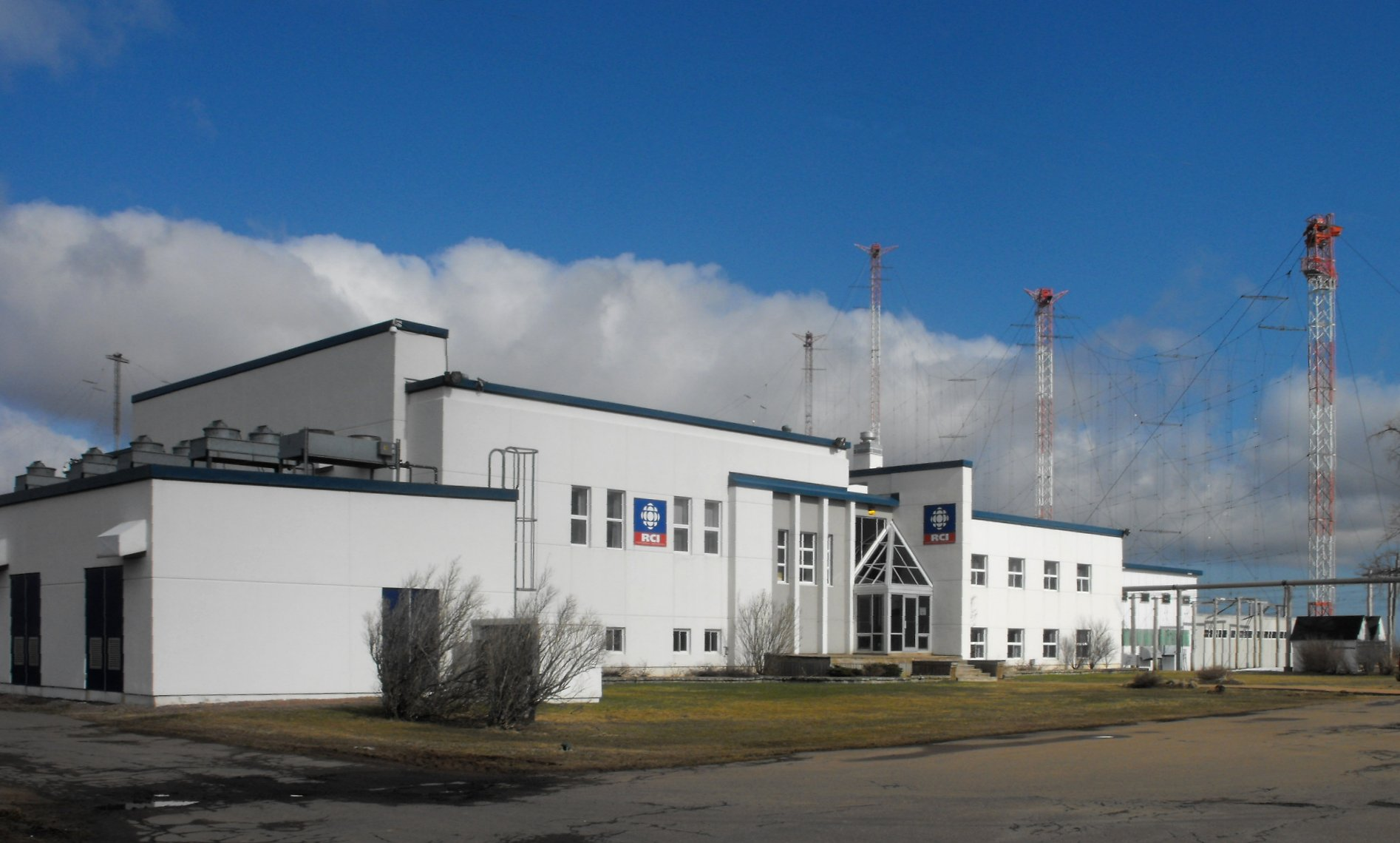
Radio Canada International transmitter site (CKCX) in Sackville, New Brunswick, in 2009. The site was closed in 2012.

The CRTC ordered that in 28 "mandatory markets", full power over-the-air analogue television transmitters had to cease transmitting by August 31, 2011. Broadcasters could either continue serving those markets by transitioning analogue transmitters to digital or cease broadcasting over-the-air. Cable, IPTV, and satellite services are not involved or affected by this digital transition deadline.

While its fellow Canadian broadcasters converted most of their transmitters to digital by the Canadian digital television transition deadline of August 31, 2011, the CBC converted only about half of the analogue transmitters mandatory to digital (15 of 28 markets with CBC TV, and 14 of 28 markets with SRC). Due to financial difficulties reported by the corporation, the corporation published a plan whereby communities that receive analogue signals by re-broadcast transmitters in mandatory markets would lose their over-the-air (OTA) signals as of the deadline. Rebroadcast transmitters account for 23 of the 48 CBC and SRC transmitters in mandatory markets. Mandatory markets losing both CBC and SRC over-the-air signals include London, Ontario (metropolitan area population 457,000) and Saskatoon, Saskatchewan (metro area 257,000). In both of those markets, the corporation's television transmitters are the only ones that were not converted to digital.

On July 31, 2012, the CBC shut down all of its approximately 620 analogue television transmitters, following an announcement of these plans on April 4, 2012. This reduced the total number of the corporation's television transmitters across the country to 27. According to the CBC, this would reduce the corporation's yearly costs by $10 million. No plans have been announced to use subchannels to maintain over-the-air signals for both CBC and SRC in markets where the corporation has one digital transmitter. In fact, in its CRTC application to shut down all of its analogue television transmitters, the CBC communicated its opposition to the use of subchannels, citing, amongst other reasons, costs. CBC/R-C claims that only 1.7 percent of Canadian viewers actually lost access to CBC and Radio-Canada programming due to the very high penetration of cable and satellite. In some areas (particularly remote and rural regions), cable or satellite have long been essential for acceptable television.

=== Fallout over the Ghomeshi affair ===
In 2015, after allegations that CBC Radio host Jian Ghomeshi had sexually harassed colleagues, Ghomeshi was placed on leave; his employment was terminated in October when the CBC indicated that they had "graphic evidence" that he had injured a female employee. The corporation commissioned an independent investigation. The resulting report by Janice Rubin, a partner at the law firm Rubin Thomlinson LLP, discussed employee complaints about Ghomeshi that were not seriously considered by the CBC. Rubin concluded that CBC management had "failed to take adequate steps" when it became aware of Ghomeshi's "problematic behaviour".

Ghomeshi was charged by police with multiple counts of sexual assault but was found not guilty of all but one of these in March 2016. He was to be tried in June on the last remaining charge, relating to a complainant who had also worked at CBC; her name was later revealed to be Kathryn Borel. On May 11, 2016, however, the Crown withdrew the charge after Ghomeshi signed a peace bond (which does not include an admission of guilt) and apologized to Borel. Borel was critical of the CBC for its handling of her initial complaint about Ghomeshi's behaviour. "When I went to the CBC for help, what I received in return was a directive that, yes, he could do this and, yes, it was my job to let him", she told the assembled media representatives.

The CBC apologized to Borel publicly on May 11 in a statement by the head of public affairs Chuck Thompson. "What Ms. Borel experienced in our workplace should never have happened and we sincerely apologize ...", he stated. The corporation has also maintained that it had accepted Rubin's report and had "since made significant progress" on a revised policy of improved training and methods for handling bullying and harassment complaints.

The Rubin report "contained several recommendations on how the CBC can change its workplace culture. One of those recommendations included the creation of a work and human rights ombudsperson whom employees could use to raise concerns about the workplace." The CBC also severed its relationship "with two top executives, Chris Boyce, the former head of CBC Radio, and Todd Spencer, the head of human resources for English services".

In a Toronto Star article by Jacques Gallant from May 11, 2016, public relations expert Martin Waxman spoke of a "damning indictment" of the CBC which included the following comment. "Yes, they did their inquiry, but if I were the CBC, I would think strongly about what is wrong with the culture and what they can do to repair it", he said. The Star also quoted employment lawyer Howard Levitt stating that "harassment has not been fully addressed at the CBC" in his estimation. Levitt called the Rubin report a "whitewash" and reiterated his suggestion that a federal commission should conduct a more detailed inquiry into workplace issues at the public broadcaster.

=== Federal elections and copyright claims ===
==== 42nd Canadian Parliament: lawsuit threats ====
During the 2015 Canadian federal election campaign, the CBC issued cease and desist letters to the Broadbent Institute, the Conservative Party of Canada (CPC), the Liberal Party of Canada, and the New Democratic Party of Canada, accusing them of using copyrighted footage from CBC news programming in their campaign advertising without permission. The Liberals and NDP complied with the letters, pulling the ads in question, while the Broadbent Institute and the Conservatives persisted. Eventually, however, rather than go to court, the Broadbent Institute and the Conservatives agreed to remove the offending material, and as such, the CBC did not pursue them further for these alleged infractions in 2015.

==== 43rd Canadian Parliament: trial of suit ====
In October 2019, two weeks before the 2019 Canadian federal election, the CBC sued the CPC for using excerpts from its leaders' debates in campaign material. The CBC petitioned for an injunction against the CPC continuing to use the excerpts as well as seeking an acknowledgement from the CPC and its executive director, Dustin Van Vugt, that the party had "engaged in the unauthorized use of copyright-protected material". Furthermore, the CBC indicated that the clips in question were "taken out of context and are edited and relied on to make partisan points for the benefit" of the CPC. In response, the CPC stated that 17 seconds of footage had been used and the video in question had been removed before the lawsuit was filed, and expressed "grave concern that this decision was made on the eve of an election that CBC is to be covering fairly and objectively".

Intellectual property academic Michael Geist stated that the use of the footage was likely covered by fair dealing provisions. Then-CBC President and CEO Catherine Tait contended that she did not believe that the use of journalistic material for partisan ads was covered by the "fair dealing" exemption of the Copyright Act.

==== Resolution: court allows fair dealing ====
On May 13, 2021, the CPC lawsuit was dismissed in the Federal Court of Canada, with Justice Phelan's clarification that the CPC's use was fair and allowable. The decision made precedent. "Prior to this decision, Canadian jurisprudence held that to meet the requirements of criticism and review, the copyrighted work in use must be critiqued and analyzed. Furthermore, the Court held that for attribution of the source and author, the inclusion of the CBC's logo was sufficient" to meet Copyright Act requirements.

== Logos and slogans ==
Logos used by the CBC

1940–1958

1974–1985

1986–1992

1992–present

Flag of the CBC

The original logo of the CBC, designed by École des Beaux Arts student Hortense Binette and used between 1940 and 1958, featured a map of Canada (and from 1940 to 1949, Newfoundland) and a thunderbolt design used to symbolize broadcasting.

In 1958, the CBC adopted a new logo for use at the end of network programs. Designed by scale model artist Jean-Paul Boileau, it consisted of the legends "CBC" and "Radio-Canada" overlaid on a map of Canada. For French programming, the "Radio-Canada" was placed on top.

The "Butterfly" logo was designed for the CBC by Hubert Tison in 1966 to mark the network's progressing transition from black-and-white to colour television, much in the manner of the NBC peacock logo. It was used at the beginning of programs broadcast in colour and was used until all CBC television programs had switched to colour. A sketch on the CBC Television program Wayne & Shuster once referred to this as the logo of the "Cosmic Butterfly Corporation".

The fourth logo, known internally as "the gem", was designed for the CBC by graphic artist Burton Kramer in December 1974, and it is the most widely recognized symbol of the corporation. The main on-air identification featured the logo kaleidoscopically morphing into its form while radiating outward from the centre of the screen on a blue background. This animated version, which went to air in December 1974, is also known colloquially as "The Exploding Pizza". The appearance of this logo marked the arrival of full-colour network television service. The large shape in the middle is the letter C, which stands for Canada; the radiating parts of the C symbolize broadcasting, and the blue circle the logo was placed in represented the world, so the entire logo, according to Kramer, represented the idea of "Canada broadcasting to the world". The original theme music for the 1974 CBC ident was a three-note woodwind orchestral fanfare accompanied by the voiceover "This is CBC" or "Ici Radio-Canada". This was later replaced by a different, and more familiar 11-note woodwind orchestral jingle, which was used until December 31, 1985.

The updated one-colour version of the gem/pizza logo, created by Hubert Tison and Robert Innes, was introduced on January 1, 1986, and with it was introduced a new series of computer graphic-generated television idents for the CBC and Radio-Canada. These idents consisted of different background colours corresponding to the time of the day behind a translucent CBC gem logo, accompanied by different arrangements of the CBC's new, synthesized five-note jingle. The logo was changed to one colour, generally dark blue on white, or white on dark blue, in 1986. Print ads and most television promos, however, have always used a single-colour version of this logo since 1974. During 1986, they use gold platings on their idents to commemorate the 50th anniversary of the CBC.

In 1992, the CBC updated its logo design to make it simpler and more red (or white on a red background). The new logo design, created by Swiss-Canadian design firm Gottschalk + Ash, reduces the number of geometric sections in the logo to 13 instead of the previous logo's 25, and the "C" in the centre of the logo became a simple red circle. According to graphic designer Todd Falkowsky, the logo's red colour also represents Canada in a symbolic way. With the launch of the current design, new television idents were introduced in November of that year, also using CGI. Since the early 2000s, it has also appeared in white (sometimes red) on a textured or coloured background. It is now CBC/Radio-Canada's longest-used logo, surpassing the original incarnation of the Gem logo and the CBC's 1940 logo.

CBC television slogans have been periodically updated:

- 1966: "Television is CBC"
- 1970: "When you watch, watch the best"
- 1977: "Bringing Canadians Together"
- 1980: "We Are the CBC"
- 1984: "Look to us for good things" (general) / "Good to Know" (news and public affairs)
- 1986–1989: "The Best on the Box"
- 1989–1992: "CBC and You"
- 1992–1994: "Go Public" / "CBC: Public Broadcasting" (to emphasize that CBC is a public broadcaster)
- 1995–2001: "Television to Call Our Own" and "Radio to Call Our Own"
- 2001–2007: "Canada's Own"
- 2007–2014: "Canada Lives Here"
- 2009–present: "Mon monde est à Radio-Canada, SRC" (English translation: My world is on Radio-Canada)
- 2011 and 2016: "Yours to Celebrate" (French: "Un monde à célébrer") (for the CBC's 75th and 80th anniversaries)
- 2014–2023: "Love CBC" / "Fall for CBC"
- 2023–present "It's a Canada thing"

== Personalities ==
CBC alumni have included future Governors General of Canada Jeanne Sauvé, Adrienne Clarkson, Michaëlle Jean, and Mary Simon as well as Quebec premier René Lévesque.

Knowlton Nash, whose career at the CBC spanned the years between 1965 and 1992, was a news anchor for the news programme The National. Peter Mansbridge then took over the reins at the premiere Canadian news broadcast until July 1, 2017. For a time Mansbridge shared the anchor position with Wendy Mesley, who was forced to retire after a 38-year career under a cloud for inappropriate use of language in two closed editorial meetings.

Since 1952, CBC has produced the weekly Saturday night broadcast Hockey Night in Canada. Personalities like Foster Hewitt, Dick Irvin Jr., Harry Neale were amongst the light-blue jacketed commentators of the 20th century. Ron MacLean and Don Cherry were famous for their commentary during the first intermission Coach's Corner until Cherry was fired for remarks during broadcast on Remembrance Day 2019 that were widely condemned as anti-immigrant.

== Organization ==
=== Mandate ===
The 1991 Broadcasting Act states that:

... the Canadian Broadcasting Corporation, as the national public broadcaster, should provide radio and television services incorporating a wide range of programming that informs, enlightens and entertains;

... the programming provided by the Corporation should:

- be predominantly and distinctively Canadian,
- reflect Canada and its regions to national and regional audiences, while serving the special needs of those regions,
- actively contribute to the flow and exchange of cultural expression,
- be in English and in French, reflecting the different needs and circumstances of each official language community, including the particular needs and circumstances of English and French linguistic minorities,
- strive to be of equivalent quality in English and French,
- contribute to shared national consciousness and identity,
- be made available throughout Canada by the most appropriate and efficient means and as resources become available for the purpose, and
- reflect the multicultural and multiracial nature of Canada.

In June 2018, the Government of Canada launched a review of the Broadcasting Act as well as the Telecommunications Act, and the CBC mandate is subject to updating following the review's completion. The CBC also submitted a paper to the Review Panel entitled "Our Culture, Our Democracy: Canada in the Digital World", which included various recommendations regarding the strengthening of public broadcasting within the global broadcasting market. The Review Panel submitted its final report and recommendations on January 29, 2020.

=== Management ===
As a Crown corporation, the CBC operates quasi-autonomously from the Federal government in its day-to-day business. The corporation is governed by the Broadcasting Act of 1991, under a board of directors and is directly responsible to Parliament through the Department of Canadian Heritage. General management of the organization is in the hands of a president, who is appointed by the Governor General of Canada in Council, on the advice of the prime minister.

According to The Hill Times, a clause in Bill C-60—an omnibus budget implementation bill introduced by the government of Stephen Harper in 2013—"appears to contradict a longstanding arm's-length relationship between the independent CBC and any government in power". The clause allows the "prime minister's cabinet to approve salaries, working conditions and collective bargaining positions for the CBC".

On September 1, 2007, the CBC became subject to the federal Access to Information Act.

==== Board of directors ====
In accordance with the Broadcasting Act, a board of directors is responsible for the management of the Canadian Broadcasting Corporation. The board is made up of 12 members, including the chair and the president and CEO. A current list of directors is available from the Canadian Governor in Council here.

As of September 2026, the CBC's board of directors page lists:

- Michael Goldbloom (chair)
- Marie-Philippe Bouchard (president and CEO)
- Guillaume Aniorté
- Marc Beaudet
- René Légère
- Sandra Mason
- Neil McEneaney
- Jennifer Moore Rattray
- Rita Shelton Deverell
- Bill Tam
- Marie-Anne Tawil
- Marie Wilson

==== Presidents ====
- 1936–1939: Leonard Brockington
- 1940–1944: René Morin
- 1944–1945: Howard B. Chase
- 1945–1958: A. Davidson Dunton
- 1958–1967: J. Alphonse Ouimet
- 1968–1972: George F. Davidson
- 1972–1975: Laurent A. Picard
- 1975–1982: A.W. Johnson
- 1982–1989: Pierre Juneau
- 1989: William T. Armstrong
- 1989–1994: Gérard Veilleux
- 1994–1995: Anthony S. Manera
- 1995–1999: Perrin Beatty
- 1999–2007: Robert Rabinovitch
- 2008–2018: Hubert T. Lacroix
- 2018–2025: Catherine Tait
- 2025–present: Marie-Philippe Bouchard

==== Ombudsmen ====
English (CBC)

- William Morgan
- David Bazay (1995 – October 30, 2005)
- Vince Carlin (January 2006 – December 2010)
- Kirk LaPointe (November 2010 – 2012)
- Esther Enkin (January 1, 2013 – December 2018)
- Jack Nagler (January 2019 – November 2024)
- Maxime Bertrand (November 2024 – present)

French (Radio-Canada)

- Bruno Gauron (1992)
- Mario Cardinal (1993–1997)
- Marcel Pépin (1997–1999)
- Renaud Gilbert (2000–2007)
- Julie Miville-Dechêne (April 1, 2007 – July 2011)
- Pierre Tourangeau (November 14, 2011 – April 2016)
- Guy Gendron (April 1, 2016 – 2021)

=== Funding ===
CBC's funding differs from that of many public broadcasters in Europe, which collect a licence fee, or those in the United States, such as PBS and NPR, which receive some public funding but rely to a large extent on voluntary contributions from individual viewers and listeners.

Government funding makes up roughly 70 per cent of CBC/Radio-Canada's budget, with the remainder derived from self-generated revenue including advertising.

A recent study by the Nordicity consulting group showed that on a per-capita basis the CBC received the equivalent of $32 in 2022, placing Canada 17th out of 20 Western countries surveyed. Switzerland for instance spent $191 per capita on its public broadcaster, leading all countries. The study also revealed that in 2023, the Canadian federal government's funding for CBC/Radio-Canada was 37% lower in real-dollar terms compared to 1991.

Example of Funding Breakdown

For the fiscal year 2006, the CBC received a total of $1.53 billion from all revenue sources, including parliamentary funding via taxes, subscription fees, advertising revenue, and other revenue (e.g., real estate). Expenditures for the year included $616 million for English television, $402 million for French television, $126 million for specialty channels, a total of $348 million for radio services in both languages, $88 million for management and technical costs, and $124 million for "amortization of property and equipment".

Some of this spending was derived from amortization of funding from previous years.

Among its revenue sources for the year ending March 31, 2006, the CBC received $946 million in annual funding from parliament, plus $60 million in "one-time" supplementary funding for programming.

To supplement this funding, the CBC's television networks and websites sell advertising, while cable/satellite-only services such as CBC News Network additionally collect subscriber fees, in line with their privately owned counterparts. The CBC's radio services do not sell advertising except when required by law (for example, to political parties during federal elections).

Significant Funding Cuts

Significant cuts in CBC funding by successive governments over the course of almost three decades have led to growing concerns over the financial sustainability and independence of the public broadcaster.

According to Paul Audley, a cultural industries researcher and expert, CBC's funding was reduced in real terms by $741 million, or 44 per cent, from 1984 to 2016.

Beginning with the Brian Mulroney government, from 1984-85 to 1993-94, funding to the CBC was reduced in real terms by $175 million. The Chrétien government increased that amount to $230 million between 1994–95 and 2005-06. Then from 2006-07 to 2015-16, the Harper government made further cuts totaling a record $336 million.

According to the Canadian Media Guild, an estimated 3,600 jobs were lost at CBC from 2008 to 2014 as a result of the cuts. In a 2014 report, the union urged the Harper government to reverse the cuts and to repeal Clause 17 of omnibus budget bill C-60 "to remove government's interference in CBC's day-to-day operations".

In September 2015, the CMG alleged that the CBC planned to sell all of its properties across Canada to gain a temporary increase in available funds. The CBC's media relations manager Alexandra Fortier denied this and stated that the corporation planned to sell only half of its assets.

That same month, Hubert Lacroix, then-president of CBC/Radio-Canada, spoke at the international public broadcasters' conference in Munich, Germany, where he claimed that public broadcasters were "at risk of extinction".

The CMG responded that Lacroix had "made a career of shredding the CBC by cutting one quarter of its staff — approximately 2,000 jobs since 2010 under his tenure. More than 600 jobs were cut in 2014 in order "to plug a $130-million budget shortfall". Isabelle Montpetit, president of Syndicat des communications de Radio-Canada (SCRC), observed that Lacroix was hand-picked by Harper for the job as president of the CBC.

Funding Since 2015

In 2015, the Liberal Party was returned to power. As part of its election platform, it promised to restore $115 million of funding to the CBC that was cut by the Harper Government, over three years, and add $35 million, for a total extra funding of $150 million.

However, it did not restore the funds that had been previously cut by successive governments since 1984.

On November 28, 2016, the CBC issued a request for $400 million in additional funding, which it planned to use towards removing advertising from its television services, production and acquisition of Canadian content, and "additional funding of new investments to face consumer and technology disruption".

The broadcaster argued that it had operated "[under] a business model and cultural policy framework that is profoundly broken", while other countries "[reaped] the benefits of strong, stable, well-funded public broadcasters".

Since fiscal 2015, CBC has received the following amounts in annual government funding:

- 2015-2016: $1 billion
- 2016-2017: $1.1 billion
- 2017-2018: $1.2 billion
- 2018-2019: $1.21 billion
- 2019-2020: $1.2 billion
- 2020-2021: $1.39 billion
- 2021-2022: $1.24 billion
- 2022-2023: $1.2 billion
- 2023-2024: $1.29 billion
- 2024-2025: $1.38 billion

=== CBC Pension Plan ===
The CBC Pension Plan was established in 1961, and is administered by the CBC Pension Board of Trustees. In 2023, there were 10,283 retired members and 7,641 active members. Both the employer and employee contribute 50% each. Active members contribute 7.72% of their salary up to yearly maximum pensionable earnings (YMPE) and 10.16% above YMPE. Benefits are determined by an employee's earnings and years of service. The fund made a 7.8% return and had $7.9 billion in net assets in 2023. The asset allocation was as follows: 43.5% in fixed income; 42% in equities; 14.5% in real assets; and, 7% in bond overlay. Within real assets, almost 79% is in real estate, with 40% of this invested in multifamily residential dwellings. Since 2018, the fund has moved away from office and retail spaces into more industrial and multifamily sectors. Significant investments made by the fund include: $970 million invested in BlackRock Canada CorePlus Long Bond Fund; $376 million in the SPDR S&P 500 ETF Trust; and, $356 million in various Brookfield Corporation funds.

Upon retirement, members can apply to join The CBC Pensioners National Association, established in 1985. This association has successfully fought to have part of pension surpluses distributed to retirees. A refund amount of $127.1 million for 2021 and 2022 surpluses was dispersed in 2024.

== Unions ==
Unions representing employees at CBC/Radio-Canada include:

- Canadian Media Guild (CMG) represents on-air, production, technical, administrative and support staff outside of Quebec and Moncton.
- Association of Professionals and Supervisors (APS)*
- American Federation of Musicians of the United States and Canada (AFM)*
- Alliance of Canadian Cinema, Television and Radio Artists (performers; ACTRA)
- International Alliance of Theatrical Stage Employees (stagehands; IATSE)
- Writers Guild of Canada (WGC)*
- Association des réalisateurs (AR)
- Syndicat des communications de Radio-Canada (SCRC)
- Société des auteurs de la radio, de la télévision et du cinéma (SARTeC).
- Syndicat Canadien de la fonction publique, Conseil des sections locales, Groupe des employé(e)s de bureau et professionnel(le)s (SCFP).
- Société professionnelle des auteurs-compositeurs du Québec (SPACQ)
- Syndicat des technicien(ne)s et des artisan(e)s du réseau français (STARF).
- Union des artistes (UDA)

=== Labour issues ===
During the summer of 1981 there was a major disruption of CBC programming as the technicians union, the National Association of Broadcast Employees and Technicians, went on strike. Local newscasts were cut back to the bare minimum. This had the effect of delaying the debut of The Journal, which had to wait until January 1982.

The CBC has been affected by a number of other labour disputes since the late 1990s:

- In early 1999, CBC English- and French-network technicians in all locations outside Quebec and Moncton, members of the Communications, Energy and Paperworkers Union of Canada, went on strike. The Canadian Media Guild was set to strike as well, but the CBC settled with both unions.
- A similar dispute, again involving all technicians outside Quebec and Moncton, occurred in late 2001 and concluded by the end of the year.
- In spring 2002, on-air staff in Quebec and Moncton (again, on both English and French networks) were locked out by local management, leaving, among other things, NHL playoff games without commentary on French television.

==== 2005 lock-out ====
On August 15, 2005, 5,500 employees of the CBC (about 90%) were locked out by CBC CEO Robert Rabinovitch in a dispute over future hiring practices. At issue were the rules governing the hiring of contract workers in preference to full-time hires. The locked-out employees were members of the Canadian Media Guild, representing all production, journalistic and on-air personnel outside Quebec and Moncton, including several foreign correspondents. While CBC services continued during the lock-out, they were primarily made up of repeats, with news programming from the BBC and newswires. Major CBC programs such as The National and Royal Canadian Air Farce were not produced during the lock-out; some non-CBC-owned programs seen on the network, such as The Red Green Show, shifted to other studios. Meanwhile, the locked-out employees produced podcasts and websites such as CBCunplugged.com.

After a hiatus, talks re-opened. On September 23, Joe Fontana, the federal minister of labour, called Rabinovitch and Arnold Amber—the president of the CBC branch of the Canadian Media Guild—to his office for talks aimed at ending the dispute. Late in the evening of October 2, 2005, it was announced that the CBC management and staff had reached a tentative deal which resulted in the CBC returning to normal operations on October 11. Some speculated that the looming October 8 start date for the network's most important television property, Hockey Night in Canada, had acted as an additional incentive to resolve the dispute.

While all labour disputes resulted in cut-back programming and numerous repeat airings, the 2005 lock-out may have been the most damaging to CBC. All local programming in the affected regions was cancelled and replaced by abbreviated national newscasts and national radio morning shows. BBC World (television) and World Service (radio), as well as Broadcast News feeds, were used to provide the remainder of original news content, and the CBC website consisted mainly of rewritten wire copy. Some BBC staff protested against their material being used during the CBC lock-out. "The NUJ and BECTU will not tolerate their members' work being used against colleagues in Canada", said a joint statement by BBC unions. The CMG questioned whether, with its limited Canadian news content, the CBC was meeting its legal requirements under the Broadcasting Act and its CRTC licences.

Galaxie (which CBC owned at the time) supplied some music content for the radio networks. Tapes of aired or produced documentaries, interviews and entertainment programs were also aired widely. Selected television sports coverage, including that of the Canadian Football League, continued, but without commentary.

As before, French-language staff outside of Quebec were also affected by the 2005 lock-out, although with Quebec producing the bulk of the French networks' programming, those networks were not as visibly affected by the dispute apart from local programs.

== Services ==
=== News ===
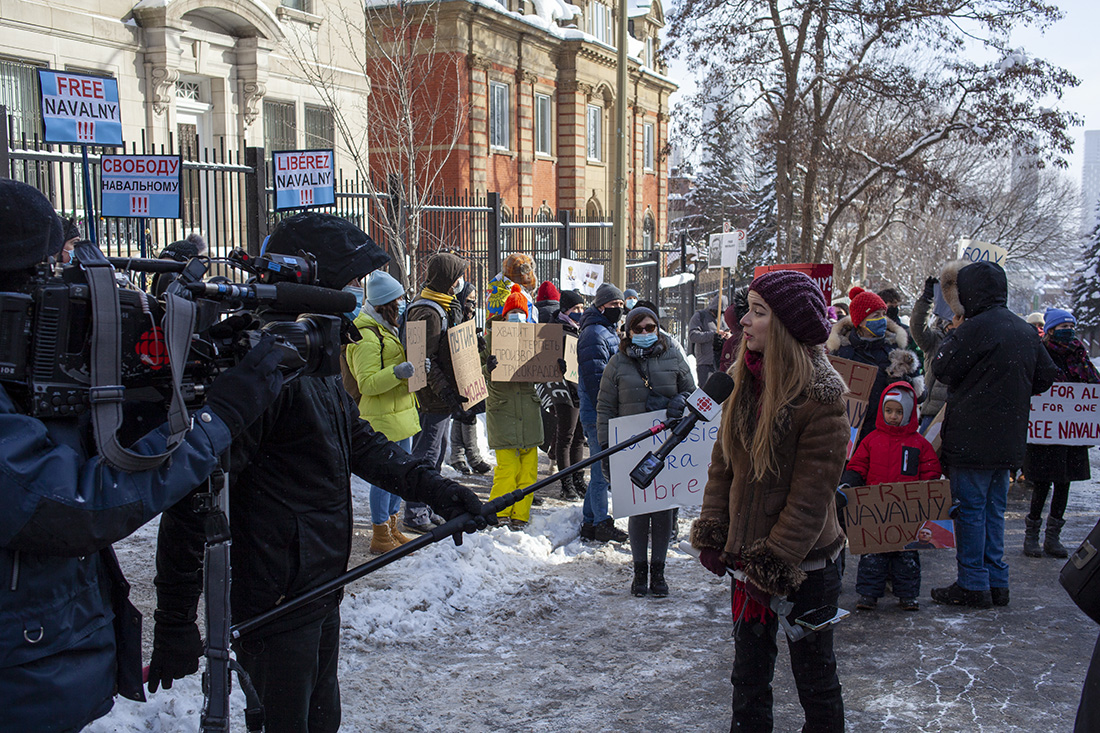
CBC News journalist and camera crew reporting on a rally in support of Alexei Navalny outside the Russian consulate in Montreal, January 2021

CBC News is the largest broadcast newsgathering operation in Canada, providing services to CBC radio as well as CBC News Network, local supper-hour newscasts, CBC News Online, and Air Canada's in-flight entertainment. Recent CBC News services are also proving popular, such as news alerts to mobile phones and PDAs. Desktop news alerts, e-mail alerts, and digital television alerts are also available.

=== Radio ===
CBC Radio has six separate services: three in English, known as CBC Radio One, CBC Music, and CBC Radio 3; and three in French, known as Ici Radio-Canada Première, Ici Musique, and Ici Musique Classique. Over the years, a number of CBC radio transmitters, with a majority of them on the AM band, have either moved to FM or have shut down completely. The CBC plans to phase out more CBC AM transmitters across Canada. This goal however remains to be seen in light of the CBC budget cutbacks.

CBC Radio One and Première focus on news and information programming, though they also air some music programs, variety shows, and comedy; in the past, they aired some sports programming as well. Both of these services used to broadcast primarily on the AM band, but many stations have moved over to FM. CBC Music and Ici musique is found exclusively on FM, airing arts and cultural programming, with a focus on music. CBC Radio 3, found only online, plays exclusively-independent Canadian music.

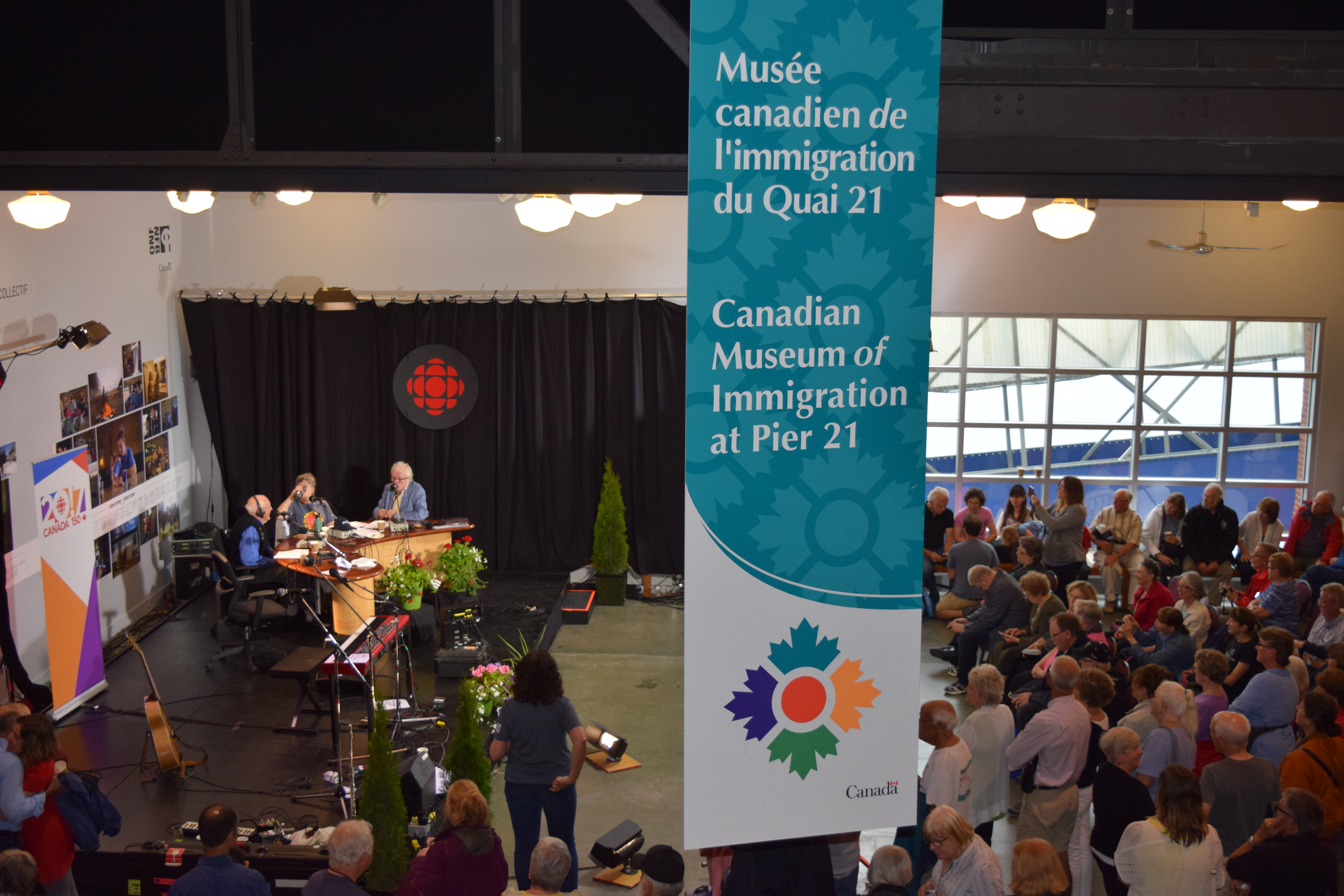
A live audience attending a special anniversary broadcast of Information Morning, a morning show on CBHA-FM

CBC Radio also operated two shortwave services. The first, Radio Nord Québec, broadcast domestically to Northern Quebec on a static frequency of 9.625 MHz; and the other, Radio Canada International, provided broadcasts to the United States and around the world in eight languages. Both shortwave services were shut down in 2012 due to budget cuts; the Sackville transmitter site was dismantled in 2014. Additionally, the Radio One stations in St. John's and Vancouver operated shortwave relay transmitters, broadcasting at 6.16 MHz. Some have suggested that CBC/Radio-Canada create a new high-power shortwave digital radio service for more effective coverage of isolated areas.

In November 2004, the CBC, in partnership with Standard Broadcasting and Sirius Satellite Radio, applied to the Canadian Radio-television and Telecommunications Commission (CRTC) for a licence to introduce satellite radio service to Canada. The CRTC approved the subscription radio application, as well as two others for satellite radio service, on June 16, 2005. Sirius Canada launched on December 1, 2005, with a number of CBC Radio channels, including the new services CBC Radio 3 and Bande à part. The CBC once owned a stake in SiriusXM Canada, but exited from ownership following a reorganization announced in 2016.

In some areas, especially national or provincial parks, the CBC also operates an AM or FM transmitter rebroadcasting weather alerts from the Meteorological Service of Canada's Weatheradio Canada service.

==== Long-range radio plan ====
The CBC's long-range radio plan (LRRP) was developed by the Canadian Radio-television and Telecommunications Commission (CRTC) in collaboration with the CBC to identify those FM frequencies that would likely be required to deliver the CBC's radio services to the maximum number of Canadians. The CBC is not subject to any conditions or expectations concerning its LRRP. The CBC noted that Première Chaîne (now Ici Radio-Canada Première) and CBC Radio One were available to about 99% of the Canadian population. The CBC stated that it plans to maintain its radio service but has no plans to grow the coverage area. It described the LRRP as a planning vehicle and indicated that it would no longer use it. Given reductions in public funding to the CBC and given that Première Chaîne and Radio One are available to the vast majority of Canadians, the Commission considers that the CBC's plan to maintain current coverage and discontinue the LRRP is reasonable. Accordingly, the Commission accepted the CBC's proposal to discontinue the LRRP.

==== Radio Guide ====
Beginning in 1981, CBC Radio launched the monthly magazine Radio Guide, which included CBC Radio program listings alongside feature content, such as profiles of musicians and writers and behind the scenes looks at CBC programs. The magazine was released both by subscription and as a newsstand title. In 1984, due to budgetary pressures at the CBC, the magazine began accepting paid advertising from outside clients; in 1985, due to further budget cuts, the magazine was discontinued as a standalone title, and instead became a supplement in Saturday Night. In 1988, the magazine was sold to Core Group Publishers of Vancouver, and continued in this format until 1997, when it was discontinued due to a declining subscriber base.

=== Television ===
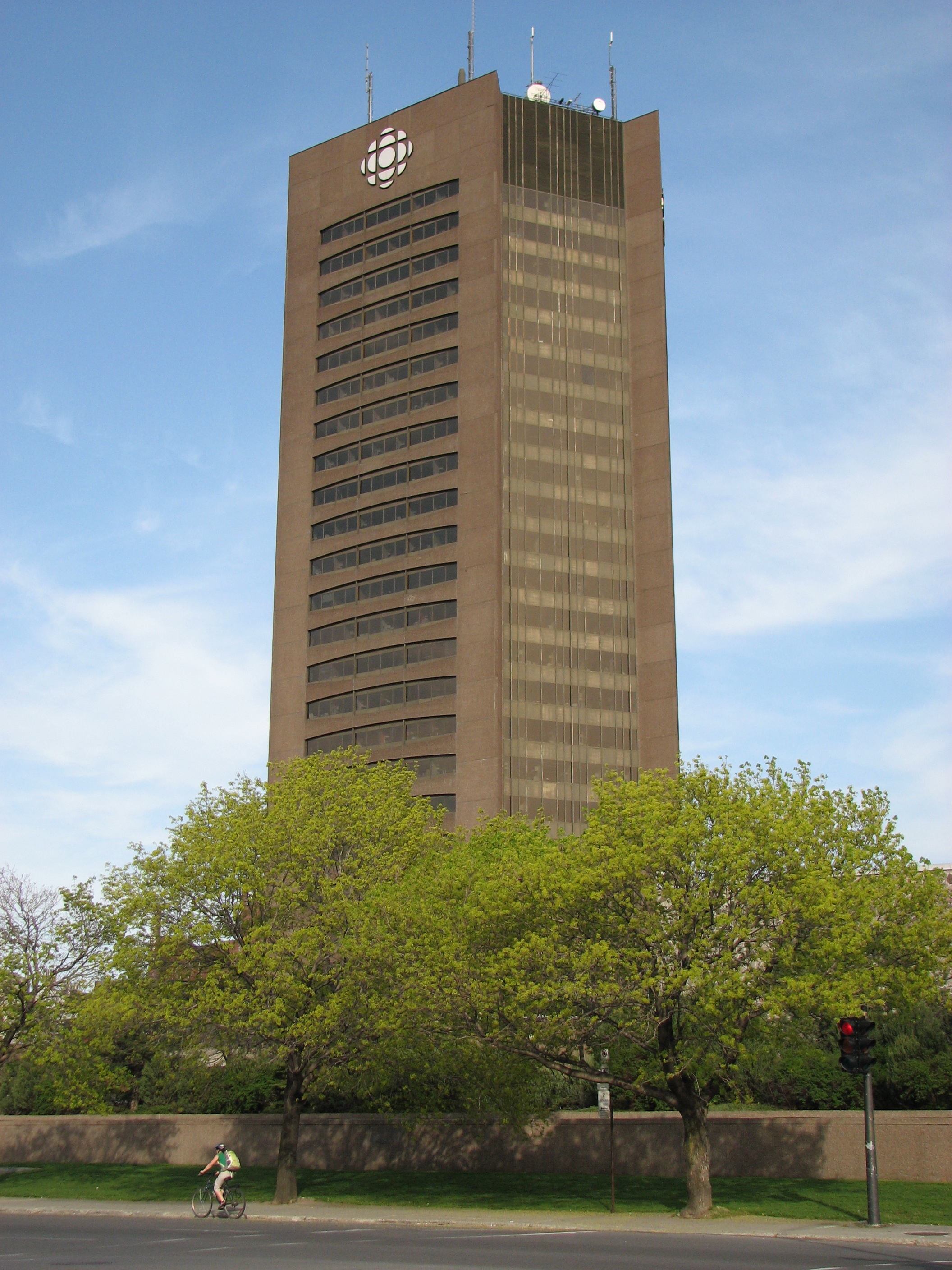
Maison Radio-Canada in Montreal holds the headquarters of CBC Radio-Canada's French-language output.

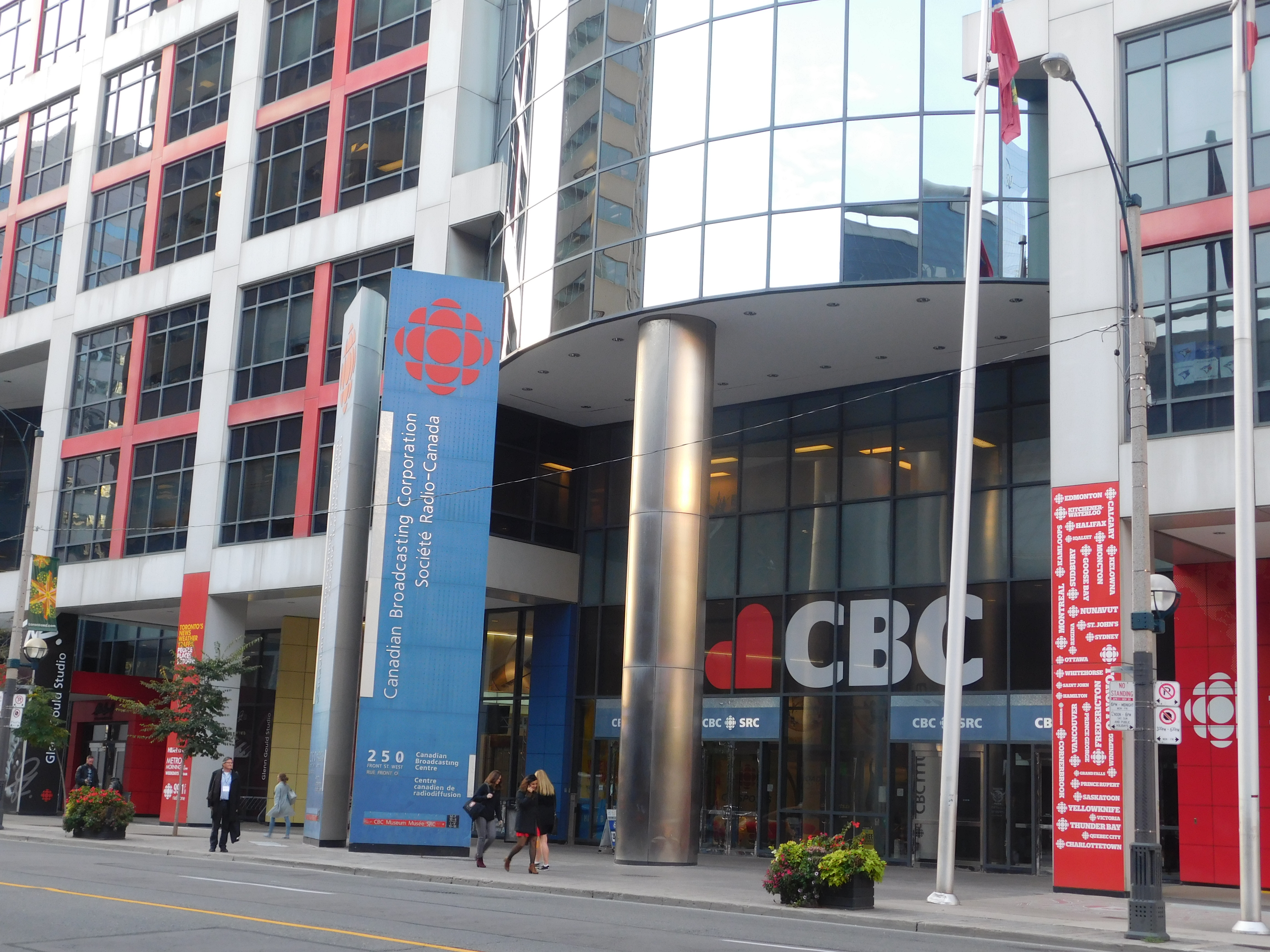
The Canadian Broadcasting Centre in Toronto serves as the CBC's English-language master control point.

The CBC operates two national broadcast television networks: CBC Television in English, and ICI Radio-Canada Télé in French. Like private broadcasters, both of these networks sell advertising but offer more Canadian-produced programming. All CBC television stations are owned and operated by the CBC itself and carry a common schedule, aside from local programming and other regional variation (such as the CBC North stations in Nunavut, the Northwest Territories, and the Yukon carrying an additional newscast in the Inuktitut language and a weekly Cree program), and CBET-DT in Windsor amending its non-primetime schedule at various points due to program rights conflicts with Detroit stations.

Both CBC's English and French networks previously had a number of private affiliates owned by third-party owners. However, the majority of them have either been bought by the CBC and subsequently shut down during the transition to digital television, or have switched to other networks and program services.

One of the most popular shows is the weekly Saturday night broadcast of NHL hockey games. In English, the program is known as Hockey Night in Canada, and in French, it was called La Soirée du hockey. Both shows began in 1952. The French edition was discontinued in 2004, though Radio-Canada stations outside of Quebec simulcast some Saturday night games produced by RDS until 2006. The network suffered considerable public embarrassment when it lost the rights to the show's theme music following a protracted lawsuit launched by the song's composer and publishers. In 2013, the exclusive national media rights to the NHL were acquired by Rogers Media, although Rogers would reach an agreement with the CBC to license the Hockey Night in Canada brand for use in its coverage of Saturday-night games, and broker a version of the broadcasts to CBC at no charge.

The CBC also wholly owns and operates four specialty television channels—the news channels CBC News Network and Ici RDI, and the French-language networks Ici Explora and Ici ARTV (the latter since 2015 after buying the remaining 15% of the channel from Arte France). It also owns a managing interest in Documentary Channel.

CBC provides viewers with interactive on-demand television programs every year through digital-cable services like Rogers Cable.

Children's programming air under the commercial-free preschool programming block called CBC Kids. In French, the children's programming block is Zone Jeunesse on ICI Radio-Canada Télé.

=== Online ===
The CBC has two main websites: CBC.ca is in English and was established in 1996; and Radio-Canada.ca is in French. The websites allow the CBC to produce sections that complement the various programs on television and radio.

In May 2012, as part of an initiative to improve its service in "underserved" markets, the CBC launched a CBC Hamilton news operation for Hamilton, Ontario. With the Hamilton area already within the broadcast range of CBC Radio and CBC Television's services in Toronto, the outlet focuses exclusively on digital content, including a section of the CBC News website oriented towards the market. CBC Hamilton reporters have occasionally filed reports for the CBC's television news output, in the event of major stories centred upon the city.

Also in 2012, the corporation launched CBC Music, an internet radio service that produces and distributes 40 music-related channels, including the existing audio streams of CBC Radio 2 and CBC Radio 3. In October 2019, the CBC launched a successor to the CBC Music platform known as CBC Listen, which encompasses the CBC's radio, music, as well as podcast output.

CBC offers feature-length documentary films through the documentary Channel [sic], a digital television station.

In February 2023, the CBC indicated for the first time that it has begun preliminary planning toward the prospect that future broadcasting will take place entirely on internet streaming platforms rather than traditional radio or television transmissions, although it has not yet announced a specific target date for any changeover.

=== Merchandising ===
Established in 2002, CBC Merchandising operates retail locations and CBCshop.ca; its educational sales department, CBC Learning, sells CBC content and media to educational institutions; as well as licensing brands such as Hockey Night in Canada (whose branding is still owned by the CBC) and Coronation Street (as a Canadian licensee under arrangement from ITV Studios).

=== Miscellaneous ===
CBC Records is a Canadian record label that distributes CBC programming, including live concert performances and album transcripts of news and information programming such as the Massey Lectures, in album format. Music albums on the label, predominantly in the classical and jazz genres, are distributed across Canada in commercial record stores, while albums containing spoken word programming are predominantly distributed by the CBC's own retail merchandising operations.

CBC provides news, business, weather and sports information on Air Canada's inflight entertainment as Enroute Journal.

In 2021, the company launched Mauril, an app that teaches English and French language skills using CBC/Radio-Canada content.

== International broadcasts ==
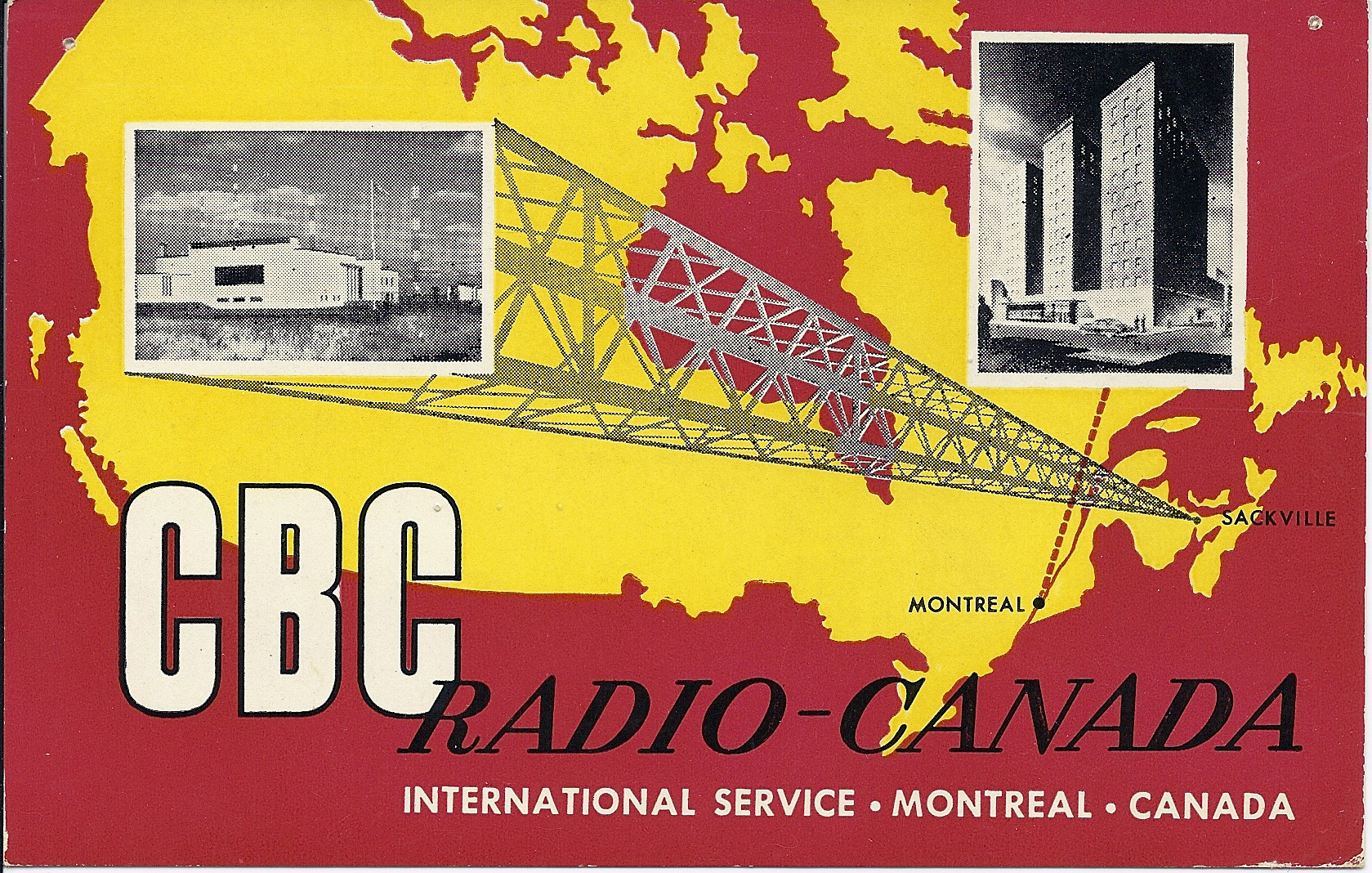
A QSL card from 1956 promoting CBC Radio-Canada's international service

CBC Television, Ici Radio-Canada Télé, CBC News Network, and all other CBC channels can be received through cable and satellite TV channel providers across Canada, such as Bell Satellite TV, Telus Optik TV, Rogers Cable, Videotron, Cogeco, and other smaller TV providers. The CBC and Radio-Canada channel signals can also be obtained free of charge, over-the-air, through antenna receivers in Canada's largest markets as well as in some border states along the Canada–U.S. border; however, CBC is not obtainable as a "free-to-air" (FTA) channel on FTA satellites.

=== Caribbean ===
Several Caribbean Countries carry feeds of CBC TV, including in:

- Bahamas, on the coral wave (Cable Bahamas) television system in the Northern Bahamas (Channel 8).
- Barbados,
  - on the Caribbean Broadcasting Corporation-owned cable system Multi-Choice TV (Channel 703); and
  - on the Columbus Communications-owned cable system FLOW Barbados (Channel 132).
- Bermuda, on the CableVision digital cable service.
- Grenada, carried on Columbus Communications-owned cable system FLOW Grenada.
- Jamaica, distributed in areas served by FLOW Jamaica.
- Trinidad and Tobago, on the Columbus Communications Trinidad Ltd. (CCTL) television system.

=== United States ===
CBC radio and television stations can be received over-the-air and have a significant audience in U.S. border communities such as Bellingham and Seattle, Washington; Buffalo, New York; Detroit, Michigan; and Burlington, Vermont. Farther from the border, some American fans of the network have acquired Canadian IP addresses to stream its sports broadcasts. Some CBC programming is also rebroadcast on local public radio, such as New Hampshire Public Radio, Vermont Public Radio and the Maine Public Broadcasting Network. CBC television channels are available on cable systems near the Canada–U.S. border. For example, CBET Windsor is available on cable systems in the Detroit, Michigan, and Toledo, Ohio, areas; much of the rest of the state of Michigan receives CBMT Montreal on cable. CBUT Vancouver is broadcast on Comcast in the Seattle area. At night, the AM radio transmissions of both CBC and Radio-Canada services can be received over much of the northern portion of the United States, from stations such as CBW in Winnipeg, CBK in Saskatchewan, and CJBC in Toronto.

On September 11, 2001, several American broadcasters without their own news operations, including C-SPAN, carried the CBC's coverage of the September 11 attacks in New York City and Washington, D.C. In the days after September 11, C-SPAN carried CBC's nightly newscast, The National, anchored by Peter Mansbridge. The quality of this coverage was recognized specifically by the Canadian Journalism Foundation; editor-in-chief Tony Burman later accepted the Excellence in Journalism Award (2004), for "rigorous professional practice, accuracy, originality and public accountability", on behalf of the service.

C-SPAN has also carried CBC's coverage of major events affecting Canadians, including: Canadian federal elections, key proceedings in Parliament of Canada, six days in September 2000 that marked the death and state funeral of Pierre Elliott Trudeau, the power outage crisis in summer 2003, U.S. presidential elections (e.g. in 2004, C-SPAN picked up The National the day after the election for the view from Canadians), state visits and official visits of American presidents to Canada, and Barack Obama inauguration in 2009.

Several PBS stations also air some CBC programming. However, these programs are syndicated by independent distributors, and are not governed by the PBS "common carriage" policy. Other American broadcast networks sometimes air CBC reports, especially for Canadian events of international significance. For example, in the early hours after the Swissair Flight 111 disaster, CNN aired CBC's live coverage of the event. Also in the late 1990s, CNN Headline News aired a few CBC reports of events that were not significant outside Canada.

==== Newsworld International and Trio ====
From 1994 to 2000, the CBC, in a venture with Power Broadcasting (former owner of CKWS in Kingston), jointly owned two networks:

1. Newsworld International (NWI), an American cable channel that rebroadcast much of the programming of CBC Newsworld (now known as CBC News Network).
2. Trio, an arts and entertainment channel.

In 2000, the CBC and Power Broadcasting sold these channels to Barry Diller's USA Networks. Diller's company was later acquired by Vivendi Universal, which in turn was partially acquired by NBC to form NBCUniversal. NBCUniversal still owns the Trio brand, which no longer has any association with the CBC (and became an Internet-only broadband channel which was later folded into Bravo.) The channel was shut down and was replaced with the NBCUniversal channel Sleuth (later known as Cloo).

However, the CBC continued to program NWI, with much of its programming simulcast on the domestic Newsworld service. In late 2004, as a result of a further change in NWI's ownership to the INdTV consortium (including Joel Hyatt and former U.S. Vice President Al Gore), NWI ceased airing CBC programming on August 1, 2005, when it became Current TV. Current later folded and became Al Jazeera America on August 20, 2013.

=== International broadcast of radio programs ===
Some CBC Radio One programs, such as Definitely Not the Opera, WireTap, Q, and As It Happens, also air on some stations associated with American Public Media or Public Radio International. CBC Radio One (with a special feed that exclusively contains CBC-produced content and no regional programs) and Ici Radio-Canada Première (a simulcast of its Montreal flagship CBF-FM) are available to SiriusXM subscribers in the United States.

== Controversies ==
=== Allegations of bias ===
Several outlets and politicians over many years have accused CBC News of bias. Surveys have found the Canadian public perceives a centre-left/Liberal Party bias in CBC News coverage.

=== Falun Gong and Beyond the Red Wall ===
In November 2007, the CBC replaced its documentary about persecution of Falun Gong members in China, Beyond the Red Wall: Persecution of Falun Gong, at the last minute with a rerun episode regarding President Pervez Musharraf in Pakistan. The broadcaster had said to the press that "the crisis in Pakistan was considered more urgent and much more newsworthy", but sources from within the network itself had stated that the Chinese government had called the Canadian Embassy and demanded repeatedly that the program be taken off the air. The documentary in question was to air on Tuesday, November 6, 2007, on CBC Newsworld, but was replaced. The documentary aired two weeks later on November 20, 2007, after editing.

=== CBC President's comparison of Netflix's influence to colonialism ===
In January 2019 CBC President Catherine Tait came under fire for comparing Netflix to colonial imperialism in India and parts of Africa. Tait did not offer an apology and Heather Mallick defended her comparison. Tait's comments made American headlines with J.J. McCullough of The Washington Post suggesting that "the state-sponsored" corporation shielded her from criticism and that the Canadian industry "was built in part as a bulwark against American influence". Canadian TV critic John Doyle, who has long criticized what he perceives as the low standards of Canadian programming, claimed that CBC had a problem of complacency rather than imperialism.

=== Closed captioning ===
CBC Television was an early leader in broadcasting programming with closed captioning for the hearing impaired, airing its first captioned programming in 1981. Captioned programming in Canada began with the airing of Clown White in English-language and French-language versions on CBC Television and Radio-Canada, respectively. Most sources list that event as occurring in 1981, while others list the year as 1982.

In 1997, Henry Vlug, a deaf lawyer in Vancouver, filed a complaint with the Canadian Human Rights Commission (CHRC) alleging that an absence of captioning on some programming on CBC Television and Newsworld infringed on his rights as a person with a disability. A ruling in 2000 by the Canadian Human Rights Tribunal, which later heard the case, sided with Vlug and found that an absence of captioning constituted discrimination on the basis of disability. The Tribunal ordered CBC Television and Newsworld to caption the entirety of their broadcast days, "including television shows, commercials, promos, and unscheduled news flashes, from sign-on until sign off".

The ruling recognized that "there will inevitably be glitches with respect to the delivery of captioning", but that "the rule should be full captioning". In a negotiated settlement to avoid appealing the ruling to the Federal Court of Canada, the CBC agreed to commence 100% captioning on CBC Television and Newsworld beginning November 1, 2002. CBC Television and Newsworld are the only broadcasters in the world required to caption the entire broadcast day. However, published evidence asserts that CBC is not providing the 100% captioning ordered by the Tribunal.

In 2004, Canadian retired senator Jean-Robert Gauthier, a hard-of-hearing person, filed a complaint with the CHRC against Radio-Canada concerning captioning, particularly the absence of real-time captioning on newscasts and other live programming. As part of the settlement process, Radio-Canada agreed to submit a report on the state of captioning, especially real-time captioning, on Radio-Canada and RDI. The report, which was the subject of some criticism, proposed an arrangement with Cité Collégiale, a college in Ottawa, to train more French-language real-time captioners.

English-language specialty networks owned or co-owned by CBC, including documentary, have the lower captioning requirements typical of larger Canadian broadcasters (90% of the broadcast day by the end of both networks' licence terms). ARTV, the French-language specialty network co-owned by CBC, has a minimum captioning requirement of 53%.

=== 2013 Radio-Canada rebranding ===
On June 5, 2013, the CBC announced that it would be phasing out the Radio-Canada brand from its French-language broadcast properties, and unifying them under names prefixed with "Ici" ('this is' or literally 'here'). For instance, the CBC planned to re-brand Télévision de Radio-Canada as "Ici Télé", Première Chaîne as "Ici Première", and move its French-language website from Radio-Canada.ca to ici.ca. Radio-Canada vice-president Louis Lalande stated that the new name complemented its multi-platform operations, while also serving as an homage to the broadcaster's historic station identification slogan since the 1930s, "ici Radio-Canada" ('this is Radio-Canada').

Logo for Ici Radio-Canada Première, the corporation's French-language radio network.

The announcement was criticized by politicians (such as Minister of Canadian Heritage James Moore), who felt that the new "Ici" brand was too confusing, and that the CBC was diminishing the value of the Radio-Canada name through its plans to downplay it. The re-branding was also criticized for being unnecessary spending, reportedly costing $400,000, in the midst of budget cuts at the CBC. On June 10, in response to the criticism, Hubert Lacroix apologized for the decision and announced that the new brands for its main radio and television networks would be revised to restore the Radio-Canada name alongside Ici, such as "Ici Radio-Canada Première".

In March 2013, the CBC also filed a trademark lawsuit against Sam Norouzi, founder of CFHD-DT—a new multicultural station in Montreal—seeking to have Norouzi's registration on the name "ICI" (as an abbreviation of "International Channel/Canal International") cancelled because it was too similar to its own "Ici"-related trademarks. Despite Norouzi's trademark having been registered prior to the registration of CBC's, the corporation argued that Norouzi's application contained incorrect information surrounding his first use of the name in commerce, and also asserted the long-time use of "Ici Radio-Canada" as part of its imaging. Norouzi stated that he planned to fight the CBC in court.

=== Suspension of local newscasts during the COVID-19 pandemic ===
On March 18, 2020, in the wake of the COVID-19 pandemic, CBC News suspended all of its English-language local newscasts (excluding those carried by CBC North, which include an English-language newscast and a second in Inuktitut), replacing them in their time slots with simulcasts of CBC News Network. The CBC stated that this was done in order to pool its local resources to CBC News Network as a "core news offering". An employee memo suggested that a lack of staff at the Canadian Broadcasting Centre and "much stricter newsgathering protocols" were another factor in the decision. CBC News editor-in-chief Brodie Fenlon similarly stated that the broadcaster had decided to consolidate news production because their outbreak had "place[d] incredible demands on our staff and our infrastructure", and not all jobs associated with television production were capable of being done remotely. These consolidations only affect news programming on CBC Television; CBC Radio and Ici Radio-Canada Télé have continued to carry local content.

The CBC's decision faced criticism for its lack of clear justification, and resulting reduction of local news coverage during a major news event—especially in markets where CBC's local newscasts are the only news programming specific to the region (such as Prince Edward Island, which resulted in criticism of the move by Premier Dennis King). The Canadian Media Guild stated that the decision "flies in the face of past experience which has proven time and again that in times of significant events, Canadians trust and rely on CBC news coverage, particularly for its widespread coverage of regional and local impact, something no other Canadian network can match". Montreal Gazette media writer Steve Faguy questioned whether this change was in compliance with the individual stations' CRTC licences, as all CBC stations are required to produce local newscasts daily, and a minimum amount of local programming per-week.

In an editorial for The Globe and Mail, former CTV News president Robert Hurst stated that it was unusual for a journalistic operation to cut back on its operations during a crisis, and suggested that decision was the culmination of "decades of CBC News mismanagement" and low ratings in comparison to competitors (such as CTV, Global, and Citytv) in most markets. The Toronto Star similarly wrote that the CBC had "decided to bail on local communities across the country".

On March 24, the CBC announced that it would introduce "an expanded 30-minute local news segment on CBC News Network" beginning March 25, and would "make every effort to have all of the dedicated local shows back up on the main network".

In May 2021, Radio-Canada commissioned a documentary to better understand the dissident movement led by Dave Leduc and three other Quebec personalities that rejected the health measures imposed by the government surrounding COVID-19 pandemic in Quebec. The documentary was a finalist for the Prix Gémeaux.

=== CBC Tandem and branded content ===
Since 2016, the CBC has utilized branded content, publishing advertisements that are designed to look, read or sound similarly to news produced by the CBC itself. In 2020 the CBC formally launched a division called Tandem that focused its branded content marketing efforts, promising corporate clients they can "leverage" the CBC's reputation by aligning their message with the "trust Canadians have in our brand". Over 500 current and former employees called on CBC management to end Tandem, saying "in an era of 'fake news', where misinformation is already rife, it undermines trust ... what's worse, it uses [Canadians'] tax dollars to do it." In November 2020 former employees requested that the Canadian Radio-television and Telecommunications Commission investigate Tandem as part of the public broadcaster's upcoming licence renewal, concerned the content blurs the lines between advertising and news, adding that "Canadians have a right to a national public broadcaster that puts their news and information needs ahead of the desires of corporate clients."

Private sector media criticized the CBC's ability to dominate the Canadian advertising market, using tax-funded subsidies to unfairly compete with local newspapers and broadcasters, driving them out of business.

CBC President and CEO Catherine Tait states that the CBC has since put "guardrails" in place that will ensure there is no confusion between CBC journalism and commercial advertising.

The CRTC integrated its investigation of Tandem into its hearings on the renewal of CBC's federal broadcast licences, ultimately renewing the CBC's licence from 2022 to 2027 and approving the Tandem program. The CRTC required that the CBC must establish, maintain, and publicize their guidelines on branded content as well as measure whether branded content is confusing to Canadians.

The CRTC decision has been criticized as allowing the CBC to disregard its mandate as a public broadcaster, transforming into a "publicly funded commercial broadcaster".

=== Kenneth Muzik verdict ===
On December 15, 2021, Manitoba Bench Justice Herbert Rempel ordered the Canadian Broadcasting Corporation to pay investment advisor Kenneth Wayne Muzik nearly $1.7 million in damages for a story it had aired in June 2012 featuring a former client, William Worthington, who complained about the performance of his investment portfolio. Muzik was represented by William Gange of Gange Collins Holloway. In March 2022, Rempel ordered CBC to pay nearly $300 thousand to cover Muzik's legal fees.

In 2023, the Manitoba court of appeal overturned Rempel's decision, stating that the CBC acted in the public interest when reporting on the investment adviser.

"Given the public interest aspect of the story, the CBC performed a satisfactory investigation into the status and reliability of its main source, the Worthingtons," the appeal court decision says.

"For the trial judge to dismiss the plaintiff's conduct and his regulatory problems in his assessment of the reputation the plaintiff held at the time of the publication is a failure to give proper effect to relevant evidence," the appeal court's decision said regarding Justice Rempel's assessment of Muzik's history as an advisor.

While the appeal court agreed that the stories were defamatory, it found that the trial judge erred by failing to appreciate that there was a public interest element to the stories, given that they dealt with risks to investors and the regulation of financial planners.

=== WE Charity v. CBC ===
On February 8, 2022, WE Charity's New York-based affiliate filed a lawsuit against the CBC for defamation. The 230-page complaint was filed in the United States District Court for the District of Columbia, where the case was assigned to district judge Randolph D. Moss.

The lawsuit alleges that, in an hour-long piece for its series The Fifth Estate, the CBC broadcast claims by reporters Mark Kelly and Harvey Cashore that the CBC knew to be false, including that WE Charity had exaggerated the number of schoolhouses it had built in Kenya and deceived donors about how their money had been spent. WE Charity accused the CBC of fabricating quotes and using misleading editing to support what WE called a "preconceived narrative".

Joe Patrice of the Above the Law website, which covers legal news, reviewed the details of the lawsuit and called it a "mirror image" of Dominion Voting Systems v. Fox News Network. Dominion Voting Systems, originally a Canadian company, choose to sue Fox News Network in the United States, ultimately settling for $787.5 million. Similarly, WE Charity, whose American operations are incorporated in Williamsville, New York, sued the CBC in the United States, in both instances despite the hurdle of the "actual malice" standard established in New York Times Co. v. Sullivan, which is unique to American law and requires that the defendant either knew that or did not care if its representations were false. Pattrice writes, "The CBC produced segments claiming that the charity misappropriated donor money... it did not."

On May 4, the CBC's attorneys filed a motion to dismiss the case per forum non conveniens, saying that it would be more appropriately heard before a Canadian court. WE Charity replied on June 10, countering that the CBC's allegations had hindered its fundraising efforts in the United States, where many of its donors are located. On June 27, Judge Moss denied the CBC's motion, ruling that the case would proceed in the District Court. Moss rejected the CBC's assertion that travel from Canada to the United States was unduly burdensome, and held that the relative ease of modern electronic discovery and document transfer between jurisdictions made the existence of documentary evidence in Canada a negligible hurdle to litigation in the United States. Patrice suggests that, even ten years prior, the CBC's motion might have succeeded, and sees the decision as an example of how the rise of digital media is revolutionizing the legal profession.

=== Twitter label ===
On April 17, 2023, the main CBC account on Twitter was labeled as "government-funded media". In response, CBC announced they would cease its usage of Twitter, similarly to NPR after the initial controversy surrounding Elon Musk's decisions as Twitter CEO. Later, Elon Musk tweeted that in response to CBC's claim that they were "less than 70% government-funded", Twitter was changing the label to "69% government-funded media". According to the CBC annual revenue report, 70.6% of revenue came from parliamentary spending in 2019–2020, while 65.6% of revenue came in 2021–2022, and 66.7% came in 2023.

On May 9, 2023, the CBC announced that it would resume partial activity on some of its Twitter accounts.

=== Travis Dhanraj resignation ===
Travis Dhanraj, the former host of CBC News program Canada Tonight, alleged in 2025 that he was forced to resign by CBC after he raised issues such as a lack of diversity of opinion and editorial imbalance in its political coverage. CBC spokesperson Kerry Kelly said the corporation "categorically rejects" Dhanraj's allegations. Dhanraj's lawyer, Kathryn Marshall, said that the CBC did not want him booking "Conservative voices" on his show.

=== September 11 attacks labelling ===
First reported by the Toronto Star in August 2026, a leaked internal CBC memo told staff to "not refer to the September 11 attacks as terrorist attacks." CBC/Radio-Canada's internal language guide does not allow reporters to describe events as terrorist attacks unless they quote others. The memo, written by the CBC's Basem Boshra, received criticism from U.S. officials Kash Patel and Pete Hoekstra, and some Conservative Party of Canada and U.S. Republican Party politicians. The CBC later reversed its decision that month, giving the September 11 attacks an exemption from the guidelines.

== See also ==
- CBC Museum – Canadian museum in Toronto
- Concentration of media ownership – Control of mass media
- List of assets owned by Canadian Broadcasting Corporation
- List of public broadcasters by country – Media that have editorial independence from the state but may receive government funding
- Media in Canada
- Public Francophone Radios – Consortium of French-language radio broadcasters
- Réseau de l'information – Canadian French-language cable news channel
