= History of broadcasting in Canada =

Radio was introduced in Canada in the late 1890s, although initially transmissions were limited to the dot-and-dashes of Morse code, and primarily used for point-to-point services, especially for maritime communication. The history of broadcasting in Canada dates to the early 1920s, as part of the worldwide development of radio stations sending information and entertainment programming to the general public. Television was introduced in the 1950s, and soon became the primary broadcasting service.

== History ==
Major themes in Canadian broadcasting history include:

- development of the engineering technology
- construction of stations and the building of networks
- widespread purchase and use of radio and television sets by the public
- debates regarding state versus private ownership of stations
- financing of the broadcast media through the government, licence fees, and advertising
- changing programming content, including concerns about American "cultural imperialism" via the airwaves, and its impact on Canadian identity
- media's influence on shaping audience responses to music, sports and politics
- role of the Québec government and Francophone versus Anglophone cultural tastes and the role of other ethnic groups and First Nations
- impact of the Internet and smartphones on traditional broadcasting media.

=== Early radio development ===
From the late 1890s until 1913 there were few regulations covering radio communication in Canada. The earliest stations were only capable of transmitting Morse code; despite this limitation as early as May 1907 the Marconi station at Camperdown, Nova Scotia began broadcasting time signals on a regular schedule.

The Radiotelegraph Act of June 6, 1913 established general Canadian policies for radio communication, then commonly known as "wireless telegraphy". Similar to the law in force in Britain, this act required that operation of "any radiotelegraph apparatus" required a licence, issued by the Minister of the Naval Service. This included members of the general public who only possessed a radio receiver and were not making transmissions, who were required to hold an "Amateur Experimental Station" licence, as well as pass the exam needed to receive an "Amateur Experimental Certificate of Proficiency", which required the ability to send and receive Morse code at five words a minute. (This policy contrasted with the United States, which only required licenses for operating transmitters, and had no restrictions or taxes on individuals only using receivers).

With its entrance into World War I in August 1914, Canada generally banned the civilian use of radio receivers and transmitters. This restriction remained in force until 1 May 1919. Radio regulation remained under the oversight of the Department of Naval Service until July 1, 1922, when it was transferred to civilian control under the Department of Marine and Fisheries.

During World War I, advances in vacuum tube technology made audio transmissions practical. There was no formal category of radio stations providing entertainment broadcasts intended for the general public until April 1922, so the earliest Canadian stations making broadcasts operated under a mixture of Experimental, Amateur, and governmental authorizations.

Information about the earliest experimental broadcasts is limited. One pioneer was William Walter Westover Grant, who served in the British Royal Air in France during World War I, where he gained extensive experience installing and maintaining radio equipment. After the war ended, he returned to Canada where reportedly in May 1919 he "constructed a small station in Halifax, Nova Scotia, over which voice and music were broadcast in probably the first scheduled programs in Canada". In 1920 Grant began working for the Canadian Air Board's Forestry patrol, developing air-to-ground communication for the spotter aircraft used to report forest fires, initially using radiotelegraphy. The original base was located at Morley, Alberta, where Grant constructed station CYAA. In January 1921 operations moved to the High River Air Station in southern Alberta, where Grant established station VAW, which was capable of audio transmissions. In addition to the forestry work Grant began making a series of experimental entertainment broadcasts, believed to be the first in western Canada. Grant left the forestry project and established the W. W. Grant Radio, Ltd. in Calgary, which on May 18, 1922 was issued the city's third commercial broadcasting station license, with the randomly assigned call letters CFCN (now CKMX).

A better known example was a Montreal station, which was first licensed sometime between April 1, 1914 and March 31, 1915 as experimental station XWA to the Marconi Wireless Telegraph Company of Canada, Ltd. ("Canadian Marconi"), and was one of the few civilian stations allowed to continue operating during World War I, when it was used to conduct military research. At first it only transmitted Morse code, however during the spring of 1919 employee Arthur Runciman began a series of voice tests, although initially the equipment was promoted as being useful for point-to-point communication rather than broadcasting. In early 1919, parent company British Marconi shipped a surplus 500-watt transmitter to Montreal for evaluation. As was common at a number of early stations, the engineers soon tired of having to repetitively speak for the test transmissions, and began to play phonograph records, which drew the attention of local amateur radio operators. The first documented broadcast of entertainment by XWA to a general audience occurred on the evening of May 20, 1920, when a concert was prepared for a Royal Society of Canada audience listening 110 miles (175 kilometers) away at the Château Laurier in the capital city of Ottawa. XWA eventually began operating on a regular schedule, at first run almost single-handedly by Douglas "Darby" Coats. Sometime in 1921 the station's call sign was changed to "9AM", reflecting a policy change in the call signs issued to experimental stations, and a short notice in the November 1921 issue of QST magazine reported that it was now broadcasting once a week on Tuesdays starting at 8 p.m. In April 1922, the station received a commercial broadcasting station license with the randomly assigned call letters of CFCF, and it later adopted the slogan of "Canada's First". This station was deleted, as CINW, in 2010.

In addition to the developing experimental broadcasts taking place in Canada, some American stations, especially at night, could easily be received in the heavily populated parts of Canada.

=== Formal establishment of broadcasting service ===
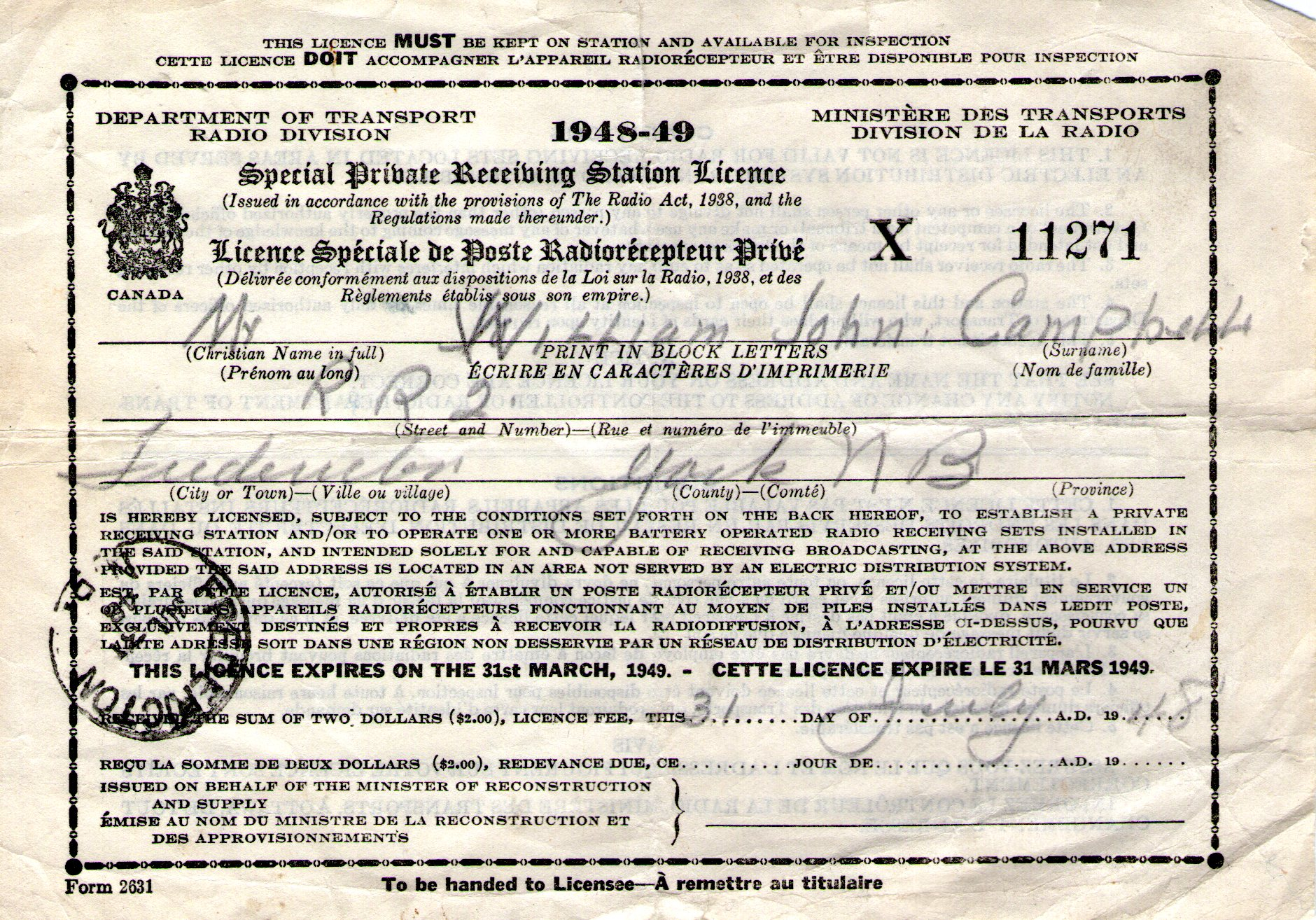
From 1922 to 1953 individual members of the public were required to pay for annual Private Receiving Station licences in order to legally receive broadcasting stations.

In January 1922 the government lowered the barrier for individuals merely interested in receiving broadcasts, by introducing a new licence category, Private Receiving Station, that removed the need to qualify for an amateur radio licence. The receiving station licences initially cost $1 and had to be renewed yearly. They were issued by the Department of Marine and Fisheries in Ottawa, by Departmental Radio Inspectors, and by postmasters located in the larger towns and cities, with licence periods coinciding with the April 1-March 31 fiscal year. As of March 31, 1923 there was a total of 9,996 Private Receiving Station licenses. The licence fee eventually rose to $2.50 per year to provide revenue for both radio and television broadcasts by the Canadian Broadcasting Corporation, however, it was eliminated effective April 1, 1953.

In 1922 two new transmitting categories were added to the regulations: "Private Commercial Broadcasting station" and "Amateur Broadcasting station". The annual licence fees for these stations were set on June 30, 1922 at $50 for commercial broadcasting stations, and $5 for amateur. As of March 31, 1923 there were 57 commercial, and 8 amateur, authorized broadcasting stations.

In late April 1922 an initial group of twenty-three commercial broadcasting station licences was announced, which received four-letter call signs starting with "CF", "CH", "CJ" or "CK", plus one additional "C" as the third or fourth letter. These stations were assigned to a band of six wavelengths running in 10-meter steps from 400 to 450 meters (750-667 kHz). Commercial broadcasting stations initially operated under the restriction that "No tolls shall be levied or collected on account of any service performed by this class of station." By 1924 this provision was loosened to allow "the rental of broadcasting stations for advertising purposes" after procuring "the consent of the Minister [of Marine and Fisheries] in writing". However, "direct advertising" was prohibited between the hours of 6.30 p.m. and 11 p.m. ("Direct advertising" was generally defined as conventional advertising messages, in contrast to "indirect advertising", which consisted of more general sponsorship announcements).

Amateur broadcasting stations were issued alphanumeric call signs starting with the number "10", and initially were assigned to transmit on 250 meters (1200 kHz). These stations were licensed to individual amateur associations, and were prohibited from carrying advertising. Most were expected to be established in communities which didn't have a commercial station. Only a small number of Amateur Broadcasting stations would be authorized, and most were eventually converted to commercial operations. (Canada's establishment of an amateur broadcasting station classification was in sharp contrast to the United States, where, beginning in early 1922, amateur stations were explicitly prohibited from making broadcasts intended for the general public.) As of the fall of 1925, there were 11 Canadian amateur broadcasting stations.

At first station audiences consisted largely of young men tinkering with crystal sets, which required the use of earphones so only one person at a time could listen. In 1925 Edward Rogers invented a radio tube using Alternating Current (AC) electricity that immediately became a worldwide standard for much more powerful and easier-to-use radios. He set up the Rogers Majestic company to manufacture receivers and established several broadcasting stations, including experimental station 9RB (later CFRB, Toronto). By the late 1920s easy to use radio sets using loudspeakers were widely available, although somewhat expensive, which opened up a much broader audience, attracting the middle class who could afford them, and also restaurants clubs and taverns, who wanted to attract customers. Even remote towns and localities could listen. Play-by-play sports coverage, especially of ice hockey, absorbed fans more thoroughly than newspaper accounts ever could, and rural areas were especially influenced by sports coverage.

Radio signals on the AM band travel great distances at night, and Canada soon found it had few open frequencies due to the existence of its much larger American neighbor. The United States informally set aside six frequencies for exclusive Canadian use, but the country complained this was insufficient. Moreover, in 1926 a station in Chicago, WJAZ, moved to one of the Canada-only frequencies, and successfully challenged the U.S. government's authority to assign transmitting frequencies. This led to the U.S. establishing the Federal Radio Commission, with expanded powers. In 1941, implementation of the North American Regional Broadcasting Agreement gave Canada some additional exclusive assignments, and the development of the FM band eventually eased the restrictions on the number of available broadcasting slots.

=== Canadian National Railways Radio: 1923–33 ===
The Canadian National Railways (CNR) became involved in radio broadcasting in 1923 under the leadership of its president, Sir Henry Thornton. The railway began installing radio receivers in passenger cars and hotels as a way to provide entertainment and information to travellers and to make CNR service more attractive in competition with the privately owned Canadian Pacific Railway (CPR).

CNR began developing its own broadcasting facilities in 1924 and, by the late 1920s, had created Canada's first national radio network, commonly known as CNR Radio and officially as the Canadian National Railways Radio Department. Although designed partly for passengers, its broadcasts could also be received by the general public within range of the stations and affiliated transmitters. CNR used a combination of railway telegraph lines, stations it owned, leased airtime on private stations and licensed phantom stations to distribute programming across the country.

During its existence, CNR Radio broadcast music, sports, news, educational programs and drama in English, French and, occasionally, Indigenous languages. It was also significant in the development of Canadian radio drama; organized radio-drama production in Canada began in 1925 with plays broadcast by the Canadian National Railways Radio Department. Network programming expanded in 1928, and CNR Radio helped demonstrate that broadcasting could be organized nationally despite Canada's geography and limited number of high-powered stations.

The network soon became politically controversial. Private broadcasters and commercial competitors objected to a publicly owned railway operating a national broadcasting service, while supporters of public broadcasting saw CNR Radio as evidence that a Canadian-controlled national system was possible. In 1932, the federal government created the Canadian Radio Broadcasting Commission (CRBC), which was given responsibility for both operating a national broadcasting service and regulating broadcasting in Canada. The transfer from CNR to CRBC control was phased in, and on 1 April 1933 the CNR Radio system ceased to exist as a separate railway-operated service. The CRBC acquired CNR's owned stations, its Montreal studios and related equipment for $50,000, while also using railway carrier-current telegraph facilities to distribute national programming.

=== Canadian Pacific Radio: 1930—35 ===
The CPR attempted to respond to CNR's broadcasting activities with its own Canadian Pacific Radio network. On 17 January 1930, it applied for licences for a proposed network of 11 transmitters, including seven 50,000-watt stations serving major cities and four 15,000-watt stations serving smaller centres. On 2 April 1930, however, CPR withdrew eight of the applications pending a parliamentary decision on the future of radio. The remaining applications, for Toronto, Montreal and Winnipeg, did not result in a CPR-owned transmitter network.

Instead, CPR operated a Toronto phantom station first licensed as CHRY and later known as CPRY. The station was based in studios at the CPR-owned Royal York Hotel and leased transmitter time from existing Toronto stations, including CKGW and CFRB. The Canadian Communications Foundation's phantom-station list states that CPR held one phantom licence in Toronto, CPRY, using CKGW's facilities; CFRB's station history also records that CPR leased periods of transmitter time for programs produced from Royal York Hotel studios.

At the height of CPR Radio's activity in the early 1930s, some of its programming was reportedly heard over 21 stations in Canada, none of which were owned by Canadian Pacific. Some broadcasts were also carried by programming distributed to as many as 21 independent stations across Canada. Some programs were also carried by WJZ in New York and by its associated network in the eastern United States. CPR's radio network did not develop on the scale originally proposed and was closed in 1935 because of financial considerations during the Great Depression as well as the termination of the CNR Radio network, which removed CP's competitive reason for having its own network.

=== The Aird Commission ===
A number of problems arose during the 1920s, causing debates on how broadcasting should be managed. These problems included the feeling that religious radio stations had "...emerged as a new weapon with which one religious group could bludgeon another...", and that U.S. stations unfairly dominated the airwaves despite an agreements to reserve some frequencies exclusively for Canadian stations.

In December 1928, P.J. Arthur (Minister of Marine and Fisheries) founded the "Aird Commission", officially the Royal Commission on Radio Broadcasting, to investigate options and the perceived American radio threat. Sir John Aird, Charles A. Bowman and Augustine Frigon were members of this commission. The Aird Report recommended the creation of a public broadcasting system.

== Public broadcasting ==
The 1930 election of a Conservative government, led by R.B. Bennett, made the future of the Aird Commission's recommendations favouring public broadcasting uncertain, and the Canadian Radio League was formed to lobby for their implementation. It influenced public opinion in support of public broadcasting by making the case to trade unions, farm groups, business associations, churches, the Royal Canadian Legion, the Canadian Club of Toronto, newspapers, university presidents and other influential public figures.

In 1932 a public broadcasting body, the Canadian Radio Broadcasting Commission (CRBC), was formed. At its creation, Bennett spoke of the need for public control of radio saying:

"This country must be assured of complete Canadian control of broadcasting from Canadian sources. Without such control, broadcasting can never be the agency by which national consciousness may be fostered and sustained and national unity still further strengthened."

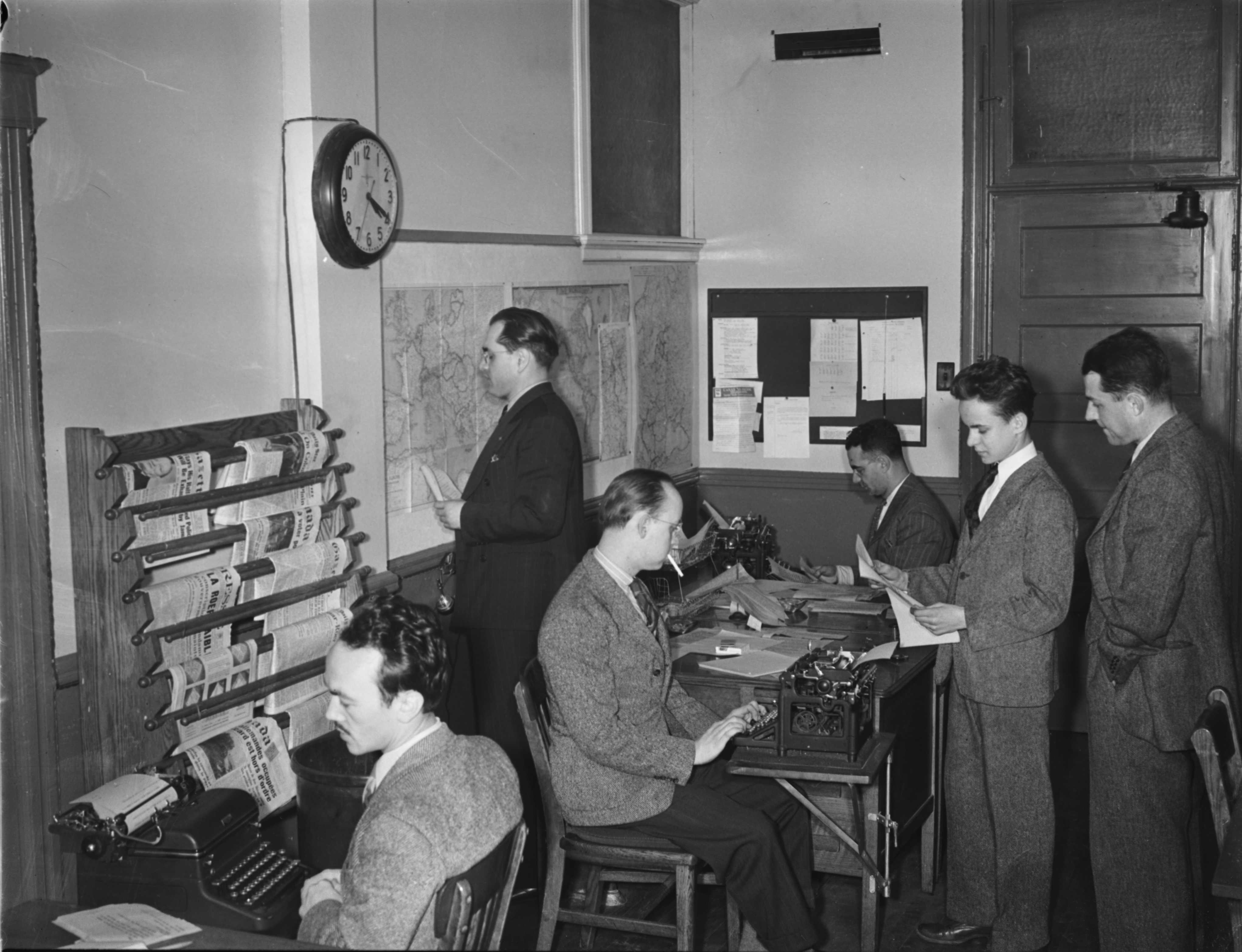
Journalists and contributing editors writing in the newsroom of the Canadian Broadcasting Corporation, photographed by Conrad Poirier (Montréal, 1944).

However the commission had severe internal political troubles, and was replaced in 1936 by the Canadian Broadcasting Corporation (CBC). The CBC was controlled by the national government, and funded largely by taxes (licence fees) collected from radio sets owners. The CBC took over the regulatory role of the Radio Branch, and focused most of its attention on providing programming for a national network. However, private stations continued to exist, which were allowed to rebroadcast CBC programs.

== French-language services ==
In 1945, The Canadian Press (CP) established a French-language radio news service through its subsidiary Broadcast News, the first such wire service for French broadcasters in North America.

The CBC set up a French-language network in Quebec and adjacent Francophone areas. Although the French-language service had little competition from American stations, it proved quite conservative in technology and programming. It was closely aligned with powerful newspaper and church interests and was seen as a propaganda forum for the traditional elites of Quebec. It did not promote separatism or a sense of Québec nationalism.

In 1969 the province of Quebec established its own radio and television system, breaking the federal CBC monopoly. Radio-Quebec became an instrument of the provincial government, and often presented separatist viewpoints.

== News ==
The development of radio news broadcasting in Canada, as in the United States, was delayed by bitter conflict between newspaper and radio interests.

In 1936, British United Press established Canada's first coast-to-coast news wire service for radio providing news copy by telegraph to private radio stations across the country while Transradio Press Service used shortwave radio to transmit news reports from New York City to several Canadian radio stations using Morse Code.

Commercial sponsorship of radio newscasts was banned in Canada into the 1940s, which prompted the government to temporarily suspend the licenses of two American-owned broadcast newswire services, Transradio Press Service and British United Press, as both of them sold paid sponsorships for the news copy it sold to private radio stations in Canada. The Canadian Broadcasting Corporation used The Canadian Press as its source for national and international newswire copy until January 1, 1941 when the network inaugurated its own national news service, CBC News. Also in 1941, Canadian Press created Press News as its radio subsidiary with Sam. G. Ross as manager. By 1944, Press News served 35 of 90 Canadian radio stations. When Charles Edwards became manager of Press News in 1944, radio stations in Canada and newspapers in Canada distrusted each other in competition for advertising money, and he was a frequent peacekeeper while convincing them to co-operate for their best interests.

On January 1, 1954, CP replaced Press News with a new subsidiary, Broadcast News (BN). The venture operated in co-operation with private broadcasters, and supplied news reports to privately owned radio and television stations in Canada. Edwards travelled across Canada to improve broadcast journalism, and instituted annual regional meetings to raise the standards for broadcast news directors. He was the driving force behind formation of the Radio and Television News Directors Association of Canada (RTNDA) in 1962, to seek equal access to all types of news sources at a time when government agencies banned broadcast reporters from press conferences. By the time of his retirement in 1971, Edwards felt that he brought peace between print news and broadcast news, and that they realized one complimented the other in reporting breaking news.

Broadcast News only had the capability to send print copy to its subscribers until 1965 when it used the technical services of its wirephoto service to develop the technology to send audio reports to radio stations across Canada, using dispatches recorded by reporters at CFRB in Toronto. However, CFRB's owner, Standard Broadcasting, objected to BN's policy of non-exclusivity which would allow items recorded by its reporters to be broadcast by their competitors. As a result, Standard Broadcasting founded a competitor, Standard Radio News (later Standard Broadcast News), which sent subscriber stations hourly broadcast packages consisting of report's from the new agency's bureau in Parliament Hill as well as items from NBC News and United Press International's audio service which Standard had the Canadian rights to. Broadcast News responded by establishing its own bureau in Ottawa and developing a package that included reports from its parliamentary bureau, Associated Press's audio service as well as ABC News and Canadian Press bureaus across Canada. A third service, Newsradio, was created by the Canadian subsidiary of CBS using reports by CKEY in Toronto and items from CBS News. Newsradio was purchased by Maclean-Hunter and Quebec chain RadioMutuel and in 1981 joined with CKO, an all-news radio network. Newsradio was closed in 1989 with the demise of CKO. CHUM Limited also established a wire service, the Canadian Contemporary News Service which, by the 1980s, was only servicing CHUM-owned radio stations with a once-a-day broadcast, leaving CP's Broadcast News and Standard Broadcast News to compete for subscribers.

By 1994, Standard was providing content to more than 100 stations. Those stations could not pay higher fees to sustain the service, resulting in Standard spending $1 million a year to subsidize its news agency. As a result, Standard chose to terminate its subscribers and only service Standard's owned-and-operated stations with reports from its Ottawa bureau and other reports exchanged by the stations themselves. By 2004, Standard's stations had rejoined Broadcast News which became the sole national newswire service for commercial radio stations in Canada. In 2007, Broadcast News was rebranded Canadian Press to provide a single identity after CanWest Global left the co-operative. Within a few years, with most commercial radio and television stations being owned by Bell Media (which absorbed both Standard Radio and CHUM Limited), Corus Entertainment (which in 2016 absorbed the broadcast properties formerly owned by CanWest Global) and Rogers Sports & Media, the television and radio stations owned by these three conglomerates now largely rely on CTV News (owned by Bell), Global News (owned by Corus), and CityNews and Rogers' network of all-news radio stations (owned by Rogers), as well as Canadian Press, for their national and international news content.

In 1989, following Maclean-Hunter's acquisition of Selkirk Communications, Rogers Broadcasting acquired several former Selkirk radio stations as well as All-Canada Radio & Television, a national broadcast advertising representation company. All-Canada's television representation division was sold in 1991, and on December 31, 1992, All-Canada Radio was merged with United Broadcast Sales to form Canadian Broadcast Sales, jointly owned by Rogers Broadcasting and Westcom Radio.

All-Canada was also one of Canada's early national radio syndication operations. Beginning in 1937, it distributed recorded programs on electrical transcription to stations across the country, allowing local broadcasters to carry nationally distributed programming without joining a conventional live network. Broadcasting historian E. Austin Weir described the earlier All-Canada Broadcasting System as active in both transcription and network operations before its merger into All-Canada Radio Facilities.

== Talk radio ==
In contrast to talk radio stations in the United States, where syndicated programs tend to make up a significant part of most schedules, privately owned Canadian talk radio stations tend to be predominantly local in programming and focus. There is no Canadian content requirement for talk radio, or "spoken word," programming, unless the individual station's license expressly stipulates such a requirement; most do not. (In Canada, prospective radio stations may propose certain restrictions on their license in order to gain favour with the Canadian Radio-television and Telecommunications Commission and have an easier time obtaining a license.)

The most recent nationally syndicated, politically oriented weekday talk radio show in Canada was Adler On Line, hosted by Charles Adler and heard on eleven stations across the country. The show ended in August 2021. Until 2006, Peter Warren's Warren on the Weekend was heard Saturdays and Sundays. Both programs are or were distributed by the Corus Radio Network and, coincidentally, both hosts had hosted different morning call-in programs in the same time slot on Winnipeg, Manitoba's CJOB 680 before they became nationally syndicated (Adler's show originated from CJOB and retained its original title, while Warren was based in Victoria, British Columbia.) Prior to Adler On Line, Corus had syndicated Rutherford, hosted by conservative Dave Rutherford and originating from its Calgary station, CHQR. Rutherford is no longer syndicated nationally but continues to air in Calgary, Edmonton, and London.

Other Canadian talk radio programs which have been syndicated to different markets include:

- The George Stroumboulopoulos Show airs on Sunday nights on stations in Toronto and Montreal.
- The Home Discovery Show, a call-in home renovation program hosted by Shell Busey.
- Live Audio Wrestling; a 2-hour show focusing on mixed martial arts and professional wrestling, distributed on Fight Network Radio.
- Love and Romance, a relationship advice program hosted by Sue McGarvie.
- Prime Time Sports, a sports talk program hosted by Bob McCown. A three-hour program originating from CJCL, usually only the third hour is broadcast nationally.
- Renovations Cross Canada, a weekend program about home renovations hosted by Ren Molnar. It is the most widely distributed talk radio program in Canada.
- The Roy Green Show, a political and entertainment based show hosted by Roy Green that airs on Saturday and Sunday afternoons, primarily on the Corus Radio Network.
- The 'X' Zone, a nightly show about paranormal topics hosted by Rob McConnell. It is also syndicated throughout the United States.

The two largest talk radio networks in Canada are the publicly owned Canadian Broadcasting Corporation's English language CBC Radio One and French language Ici Radio-Canada Première. These stations typically produce their own local morning and afternoon programs and regional noon hour programs to go along with the network programming that is aired during the rest of the day. Both networks are commercial-free. CBC Radio One's flagship national talk program is the weekend Cross Country Checkup, which has been broadcast since 1965.

CFRA (580 AM) in Ottawa (formerly part of the CHUM network, which is now part of CTV) has a large and dedicated listening audience. The station is heard throughout the Ottawa valley and on the Internet. Several key programs focus on local political and world issues.

Privately owned talk radio syndication networks in Canada are generally formed for the purposes of sharing programs across a group of stations with common ownership, although some are formed to distribute their one or two talk radio programs to a number of stations regardless of ownership. The largest of these is the Corus Radio Network. TSN Radio, the successor to the long-defunct the Team, is one of the newest national networks in Canada, with operations in three of its major markets, and has room for expansion.

== See also ==
- 1999 CBC strike
- History of broadcasting
- Canadian Communications Foundation
- CNR Radio, The radio network operated by Canadian National Railway 1923-33
- Canadian Broadcasting Corporation
