= Das aktuelle sportstudio =

German television show

das aktuelle sportstudio
- Theme music composer: Thomas Reich
- Country of origin: West Germany (1963–1990); Germany (1990–present)
- Original language: German

Production
- Production locations: Mainz, Germany

Original release
- Network: ZDF
- Release: 14 August 1963 – present

Das aktuelle Sportstudio (stylized in lowercase) is a weekly sports TV show on German channel ZDF, broadcast late on Saturday evenings. The program is repeated later on 3sat. It was first broadcast on 24 August 1963. From 1999 to 2005, the program was called ZDF Sportstudio.

According to sources involved in the negotiations, ZDF paid €88–92 million for a package of Bundesliga TV-broadcasting rights for the four seasons from 2013/14 to 2016/17.

== History ==
When ZDF started in 1963, it had a modest budget and it was decided to try to attract an audience using sports. This was the beginning of an unusually large sports editorial team of 42 employees, who actually succeeded in overcoming the ARD for a whole time with the visual participation. This project favored the recently introduced football league, which made football more attractive with its point system. To this end, a tailor-made program was created.

The original name Das aktuelle Sport-Studio was changed to ZDF Sportstudio on 4 December 1999 and the time slot was permanently moved to 11 p.m. in 2004. The reason for this: so far, the studio had always been broadcast live, which was expressed by the word "aktuell" in the title. Now it was only a question of a consignment previously recorded for reasons of cost. From 6 August 2005, the program was broadcast live and under the name das aktuelle sportstudio on the old broadcasting station at 10 p.m.. At the start of broadcasting after 10 p.m., das aktuelle sportstudio was sent in a time-delayed manner in exceptional cases. Since 11 September 2010, das aktuelle sportstudio is usually recorded on Saturdays from about 22:30 hrs ("live on tape") and is broadcast from 11 p.m. onwards.

According to negotiating circles for the four seasons 2013/14 to 2016/17, ZDF is paying between 88 and 92 million euros for the package of Bundesliga broadcasting rights on which the broadcast is based. The channel does not give any information on the amount of expenditure. According to ZDF, the 46 to 48 75-minute broadcasts per year have an average cost of about 150,000 euros.

== Presenters ==
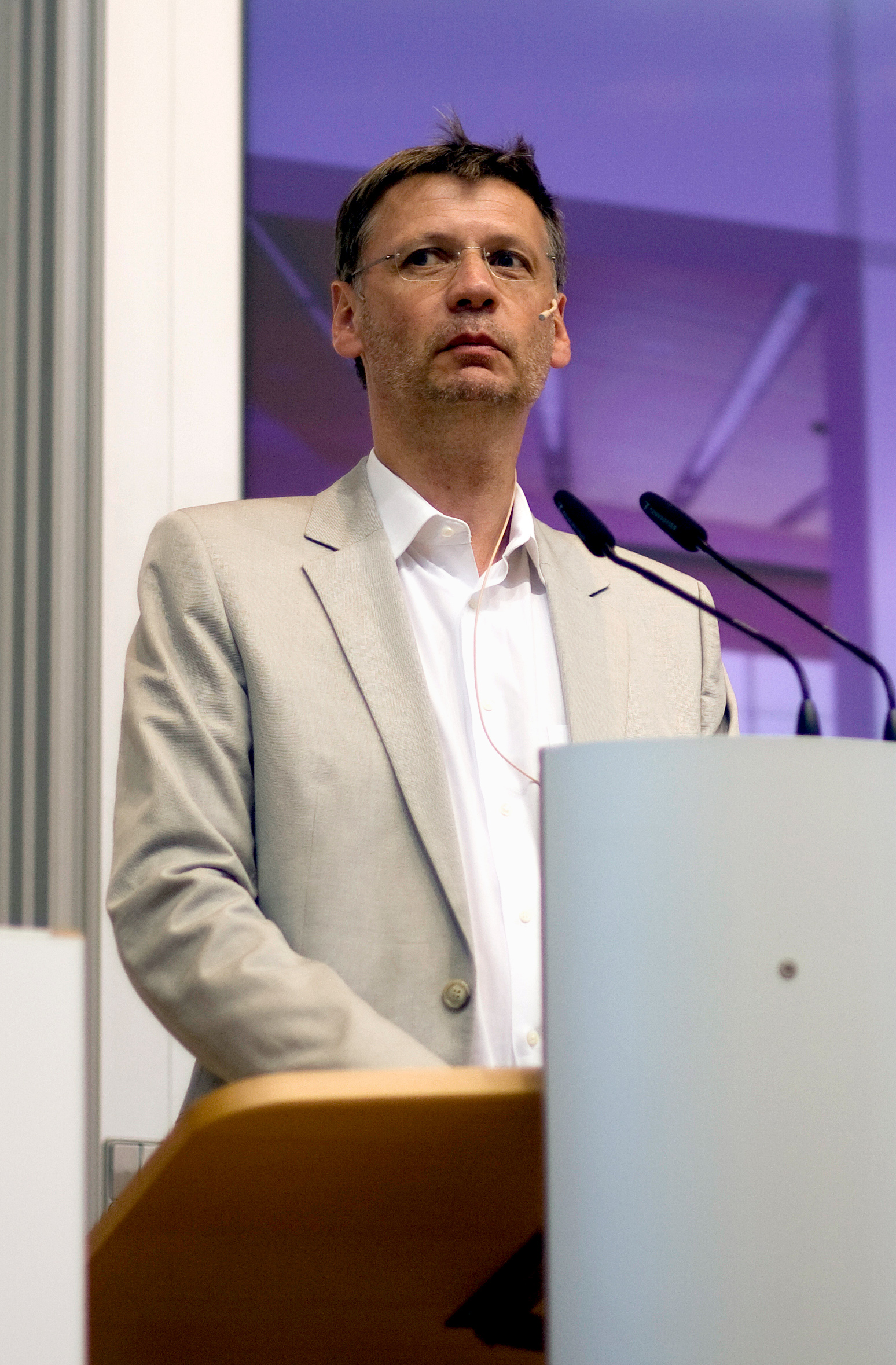
Günther Jauch

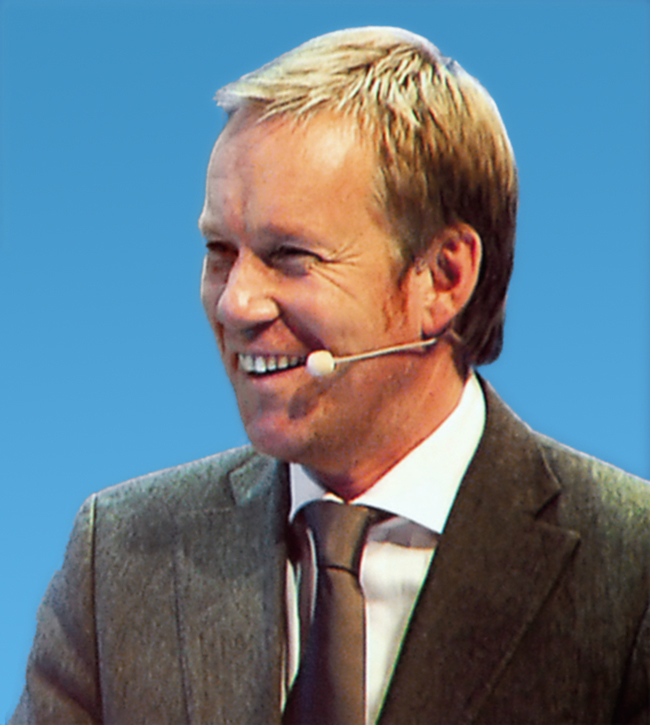
Johannes B. Kerner

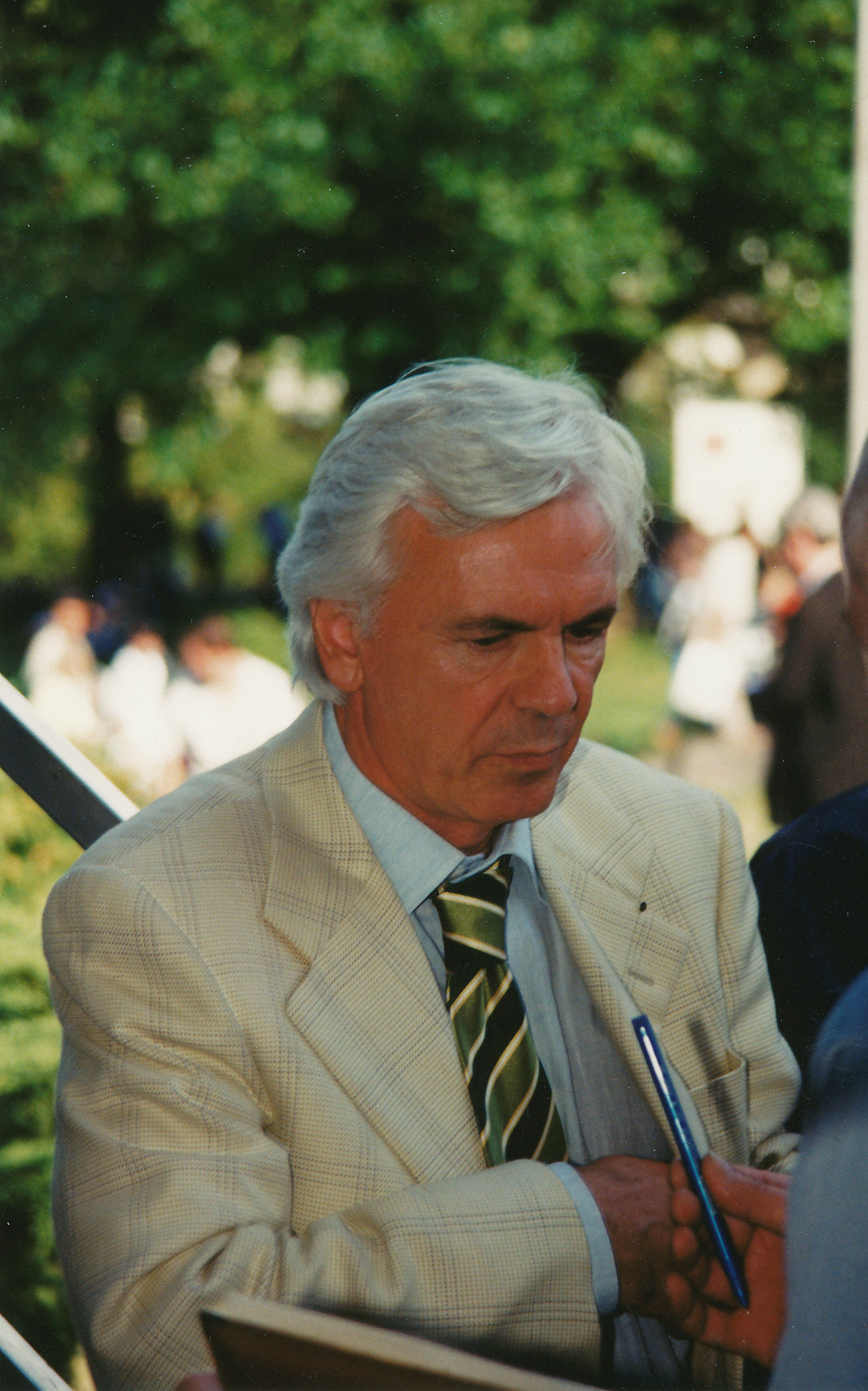
Dieter Kürten

Some of the presenters were athletes before joining the program, such as figure skaters (Rudi Cerne), footballers (Michael Steinbrecher) or athletes (Wolf-Dieter Poschmann and Bernd Heller).

Carmen Thomas became the first female presenter of the show (and the first female presenter of a sports show on German television) on 3 February 1973. Her tenure is connected with two other events in German television history: in her second program, she was able to present the picture of the Bild am Sonntag newspaper of the following day and to read the criticism of their broadcast. On 21 July 1973, however, she mistakenly referred to football team Schalke 04 as "Schalke 05", which she is still asked about almost every week. 30 years later, at the home match on 28 August 2004 against FC Hansa Rostock, she issued an official apology for her error to all the Schalke fans present.

| Moderator | Masculine/ Female | From | | To |
|---|---|---|---|---|
| Arnim Basche | m | 1972 | to | 1974 |
| Helmuth Bendt | m | 1963 | to | 1981 |
| Jochen Breyer | m | 2013 | to | today |
| Rudi Cerne | m | 1999 | to | 2006 |
| Hanns Joachim Friedrichs | m | 1971 | to | 1981 |
| Rainer Günzler | m | 1963 | to | 1969 |
| Joan Haanappel | w | 1980 | to | 1981 |
| Bernd Heller | m | 1980 | to | 1993 |
| Günther Jauch | m | 1988 | to | 1997 |
| Johannes B. Kerner | m | 1997 | to | 2006 |
| Norbert König | m | 1992 | to | 1994 |
| Gerd Krämer | m | 1964 | to | 1968 |
| Dieter Kürten | m | 1967 | to | 2000 |
| Sissy de Mas | w | 1980 | to | 1981 |
| Heribert Meisel | m | 1963 | to | 1964 |
| Katrin Müller-Hohenstein | w | 2006 | to | today |
| Doris Papperitz | w | 1984 | to | 1990 |
| Wolf-Dieter Poschmann | m | 1994 | to | 2011 |
| Christine Reinhart | w | 1993 | to | 1995 |
| Werner Schneider | m | 1964 | to | 1973 |
| Werner Schneyder | m | 1975 | to | 1979 |
| Karl Senne | m | 1981 | to | 1992 |
| Michael Steinbrecher | m | 1992 | to | 2013 |
| Wim Thoelke | m | 1963 | to | 1970 |
| Carmen Thomas | w | 1973 | to | 1974 |
| Harry Valérien | m | 1963 | to | 1988 |
| Sven Voss | m | 2011 | to | today |
