= Carmen Thomas =

German journalist, radio and television presenter, author and lecturer

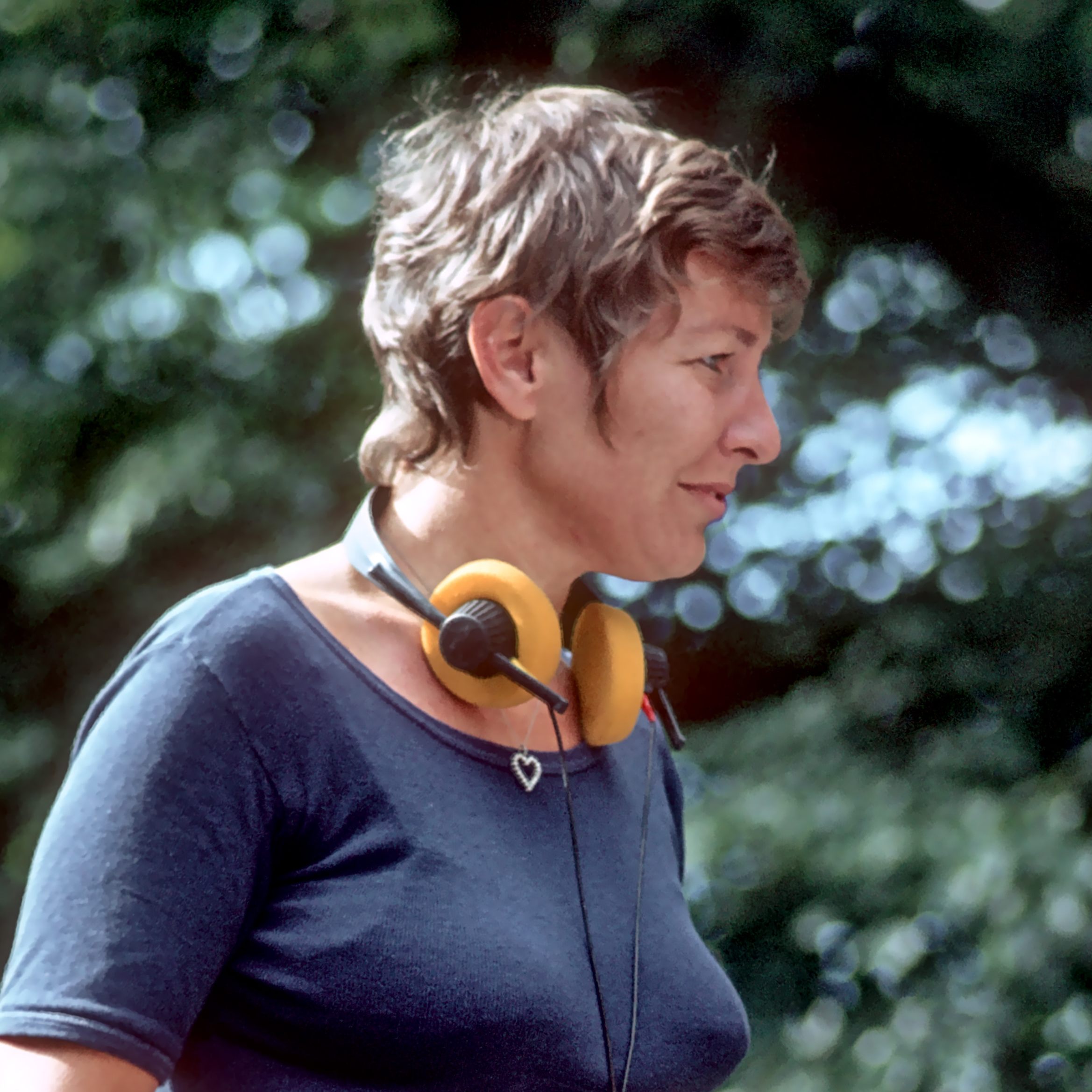
- Thomas in Hallo Ü-Wagen on 29 July 1982
- Born: 7 May 1946 (age 80); Düsseldorf, North Rhine-Westphalia, Germany
- Education: University of Cologne
- Occupations: Journalist; Radio presenter; Television presenter; Author; Lecturer
- Organizations: Westdeutscher Rundfunk; ZDF
- Website: www.carmenthomas.de

Carmen Thomas (born 7 May 1946) is a German journalist, radio and television presenter, author and lecturer. On television, she was the first woman to present the ZDF's das aktuelle Sportstudio. She worked for public radio, running Hallo Ü-Wagen, a weekly travelling talk radio show for two decades. In 1990 Forbes named her one of the 100 most influential women in Germany.

== Career ==
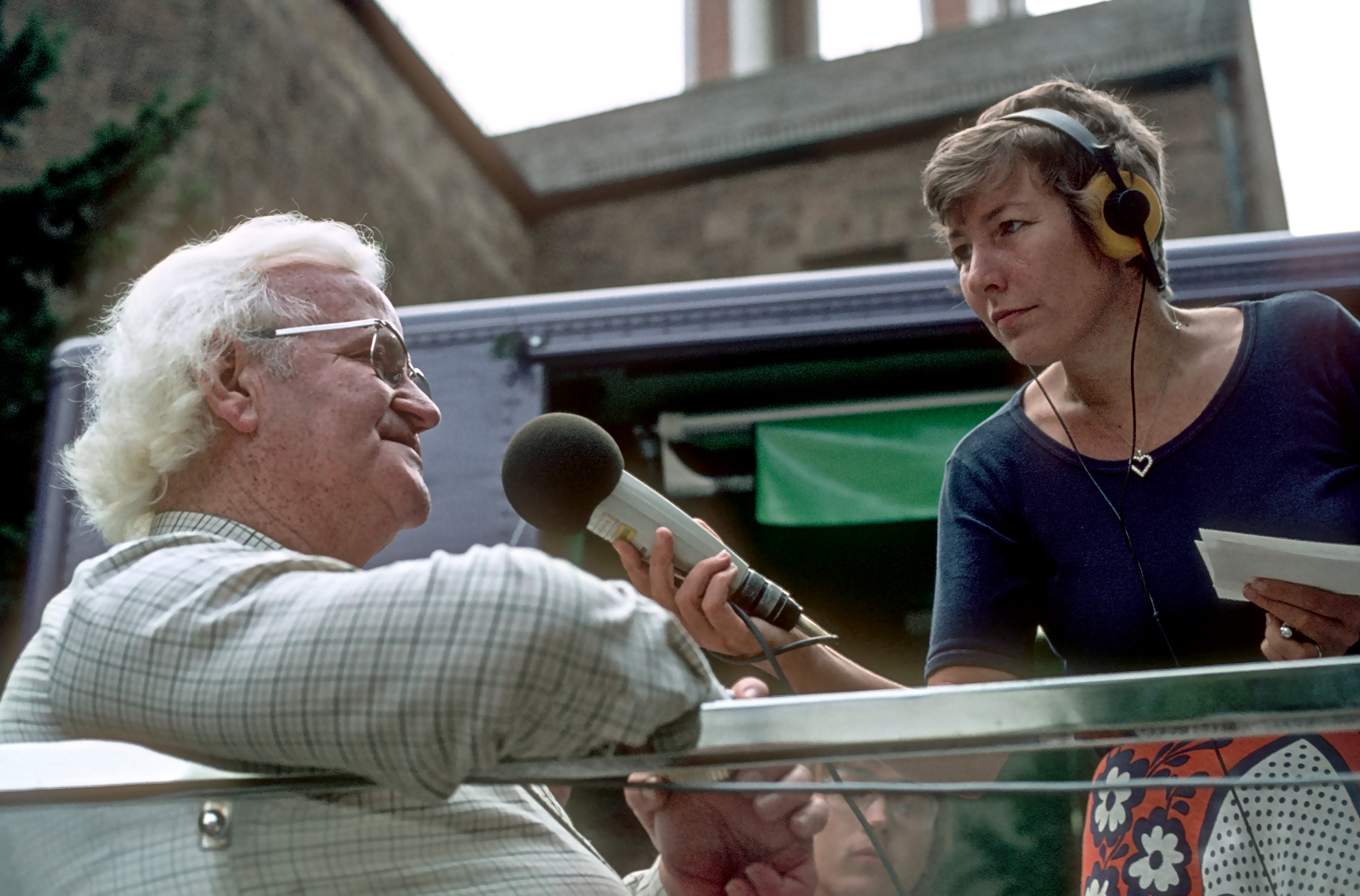
Thomas conducting an interview on the show Hallo Ü-Wagen (1982)

Born in Düsseldorf, Thomas studied German, English, and pedagogy at the University of Cologne. Even during her studies, she worked for the broadcaster Westdeutscher Rundfunk (WDR) in Cologne, from 1968 as a presenter, then as a freelance contributing editor, later on the staff, and also as director for a group of programs (Programmgruppenleiterin).

She began in the live morning show WDR Morgenmagazin, working until 1974. From 1969 to 1971, she was a reporter for the television news Hier und heute. In 1972, she was the first woman to present the television day magazine, which led to a contract for a year with the BBC for Midweek, the first such contract for a German woman. She was the first female sports presenter when she began presenting das aktuelle sportstudio of the ZDF in 1973. After the Sportstudio, from 1975, she presented the 3 nach 9 talk show on Radio Bremen for two years.

From 1974 to 1994, she was director and presenter of Hallo Ü-Wagen (Hello Radio Van), a travelling talk radio show which she ran weekly at different locations, focusing on topics suggested by listeners and live interviews with experts and the audience. For Hallo Ü-Wagen, Forbes named her one of the 100 most influential women in Germany in 1990.

From 1976, Thomas developed one of the first support groups (Selbsthilfegruppen) in Germany. In 1989 the WDR began a group Forum für Mitmach-Sendungen (Forum for Participation Broadcasts), which Thomas directed for almost ten years.

Thomas taught at universities for 13 years, and has coached people in commerce, politics, and media since 1980. She became executive director of the ModerationsAkademie für Medien + Wirtschaft Carmen Thomas in Ehreshoven in 2001.

== Literature ==
- Antje Kahnt: Düsseldorfs starke Frauen – 30 Portraits Droste, Düsseldorf 2016, ISBN 978-3-7700-1577-1, pp. 175–180.
- Stefan Willeke: Null fünf – Das Carmen-Thomas-Jahr hat begonnen. In: Die Zeit, No. 2/2005.
- WDR Geschichte(n) – Eine Zeitreise in 14 Interviews: Carmen Thomas, a film by Klaus Michael Heinz, WDR, 6 October 2018, 60 min.
