= Canadian Communications Foundation =

Canadian non-profit organization

The Canadian Communications Foundation (CCF) was a Canadian nonprofit organization which documented the history of broadcasting in Canada, particularly radio and television networks, programs and broadcasters. The organization was established in 1967 and announced that it would begin wrapping up its work in 2023. Since 1995, the organization distributed its collection via its website.

The CCF was established in 1967 by the Canadian Association of Broadcasters. Its mission: to "commemorate throughout Canada the development of electronic communications". By 2020, the foundation started to wind down as its original mission was largely accomplished. The foundation's collected materials included interviews with broadcasters who had helped shape Canada's broadcast industry, a history of television stations, a Hall of Fame for broadcasters, and a collection of research articles on broadcasting in Canada.

== See also ==
- Canadian Association of Broadcasters
