= Warren on the Weekend =

Syndicated Canadian talk radio program

Warren on the Weekend was a syndicated Canadian talk radio program hosted by Peter Warren from 1998 to 2006. It was broadcast on several AM radio stations, mainly in Western Canada, on Saturdays and Sundays from 11 a.m. to 2 p.m. Pacific Time on the Corus Radio Network. Warren left the show in March 2006, to devote his efforts to his work as an investigative journalist. The final edition of Warren on the Weekend was broadcast on March 5, 2006.

== Notes ==
- BC Business Magazine profile
- Globe and Mail article about his retirement from radio
- Biographical sketch
