= Dieter Kürten =

German sports journalist

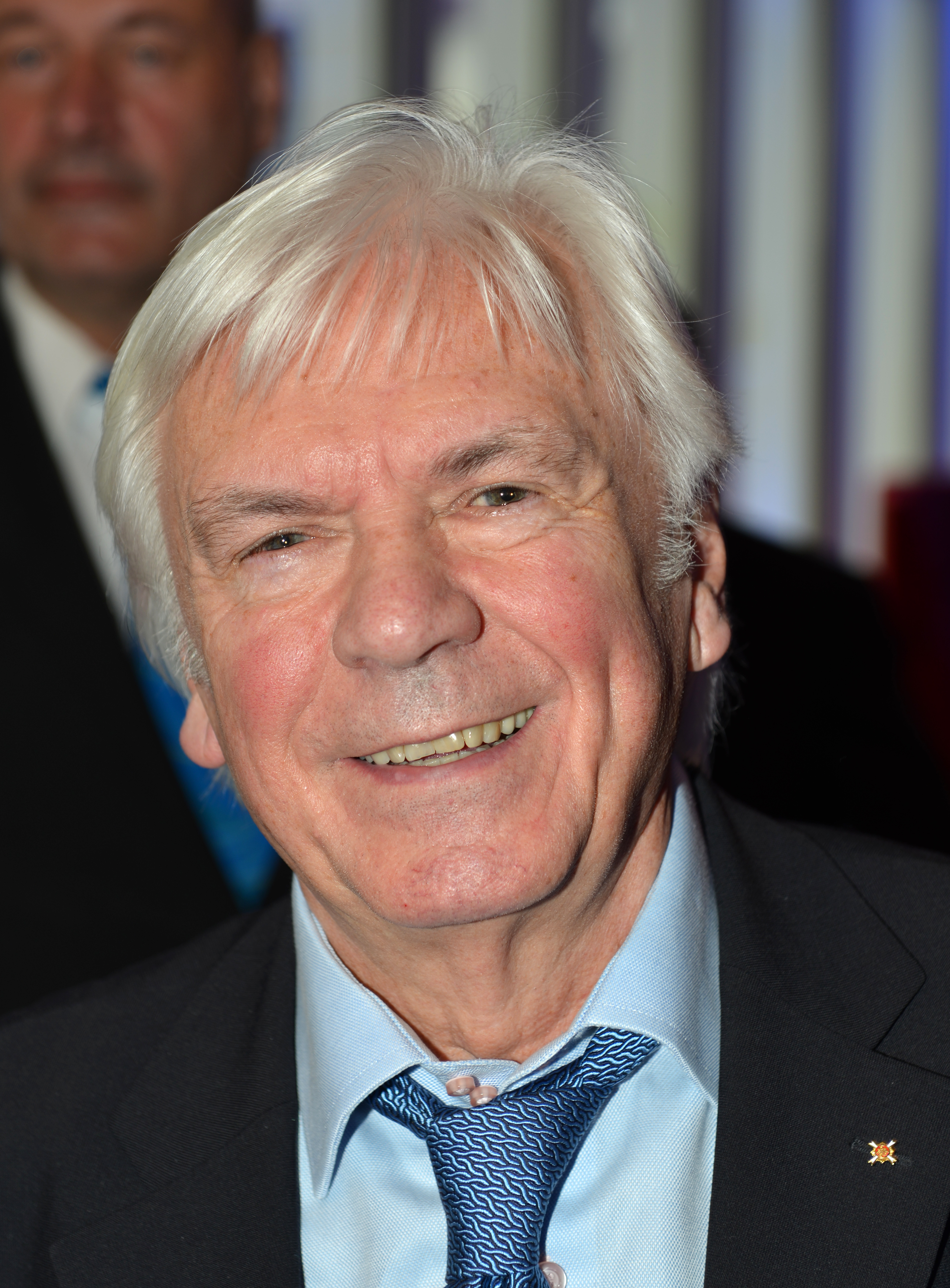
Dieter Kürten, January 2014

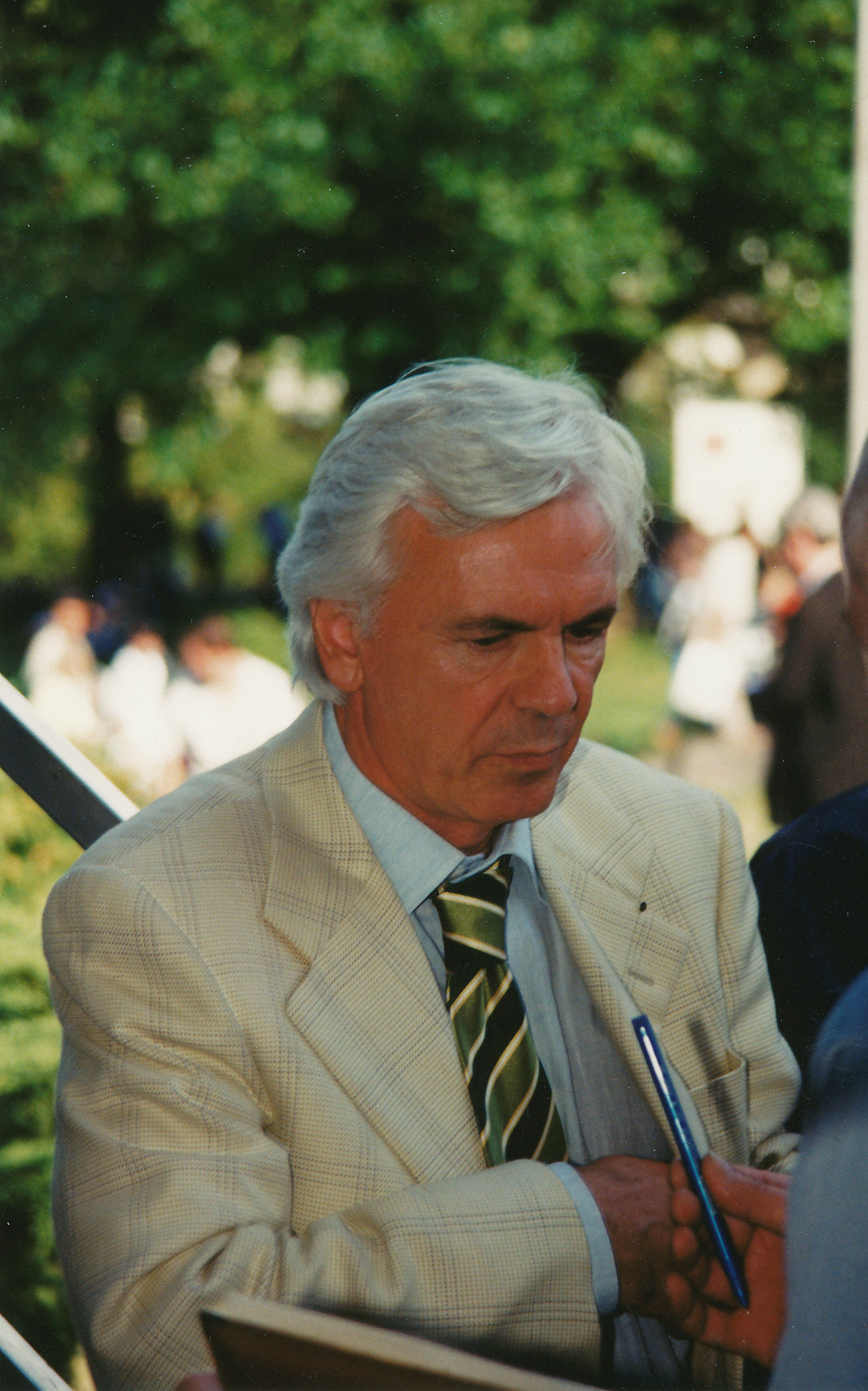
Kürten in November 2008

Dieter Kürten (German: [ˈdiːtɐ ˈkʏʁtn̩]; born 23 April 1935 in Duisburg) is a German sports journalist.

== Life ==
Kürten worked from 1967 to 2000 for sport magazine das aktuelle sportstudio at German broadcaster ZDF. Kürten is married and has three children.

== Awards ==
- 1979 – Goldener Gong for Länderspiel: Bundesrepublik–Argentinien
- 1981 – Goldene Kamera in category sportjournalist
