= Julitta Münch =

German journalist (1959–2020)

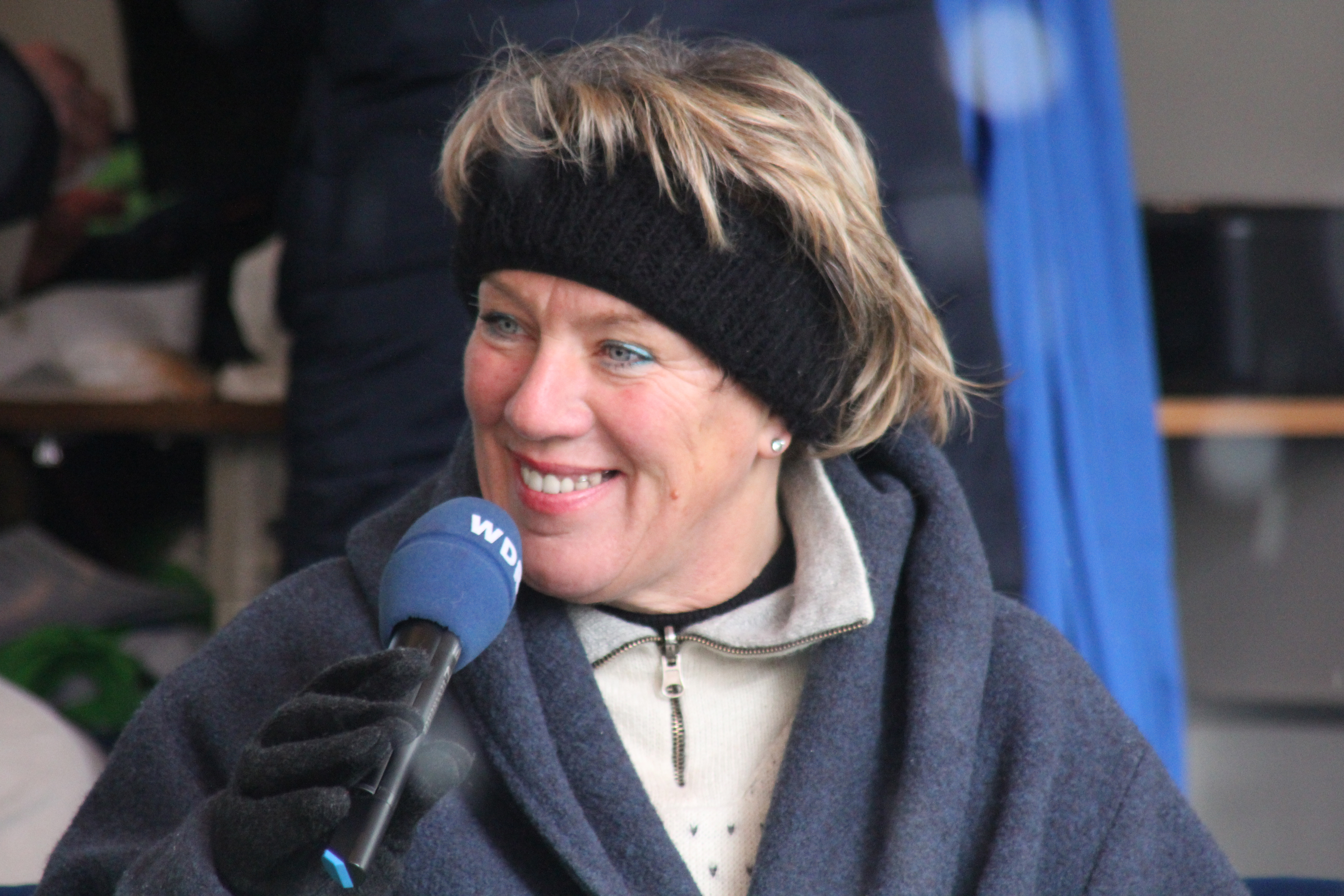
- Münch in Munich, 2010
- Born: 25 July 1959; Düsseldorf, West Germany
- Died: 21 May 2020 (aged 60); Lohmar, Germany
- Occupations: Presenter and journalist

Julitta Münch (25 July 1959 – 21 May 2020) was a German presenter and journalist.

== Life ==
Münch was born in Düsseldorf, and did a journalistic traineeship after completing her studies in 1989. In 1992, she and Jürgen Drensek became the first presenters of the ARD-Morgenmagazin, which she presented until 1994. From 1995, she worked at WDR 5, where she presented Morgenecho and Neugier genügt. From 1997 to the end of 2010, Münch took over the radio broadcast program Hallo Ü-Wagen at WDR 5.

In addition, she was a reporter for ARD and presented at Deutschlandfunk Wirtschaftsmagazin and Morgenmagazin.

Münch died on 21 May 2020 in Lohmar, aged 60.
