= Hallo Ü-Wagen =

Travelling radio series

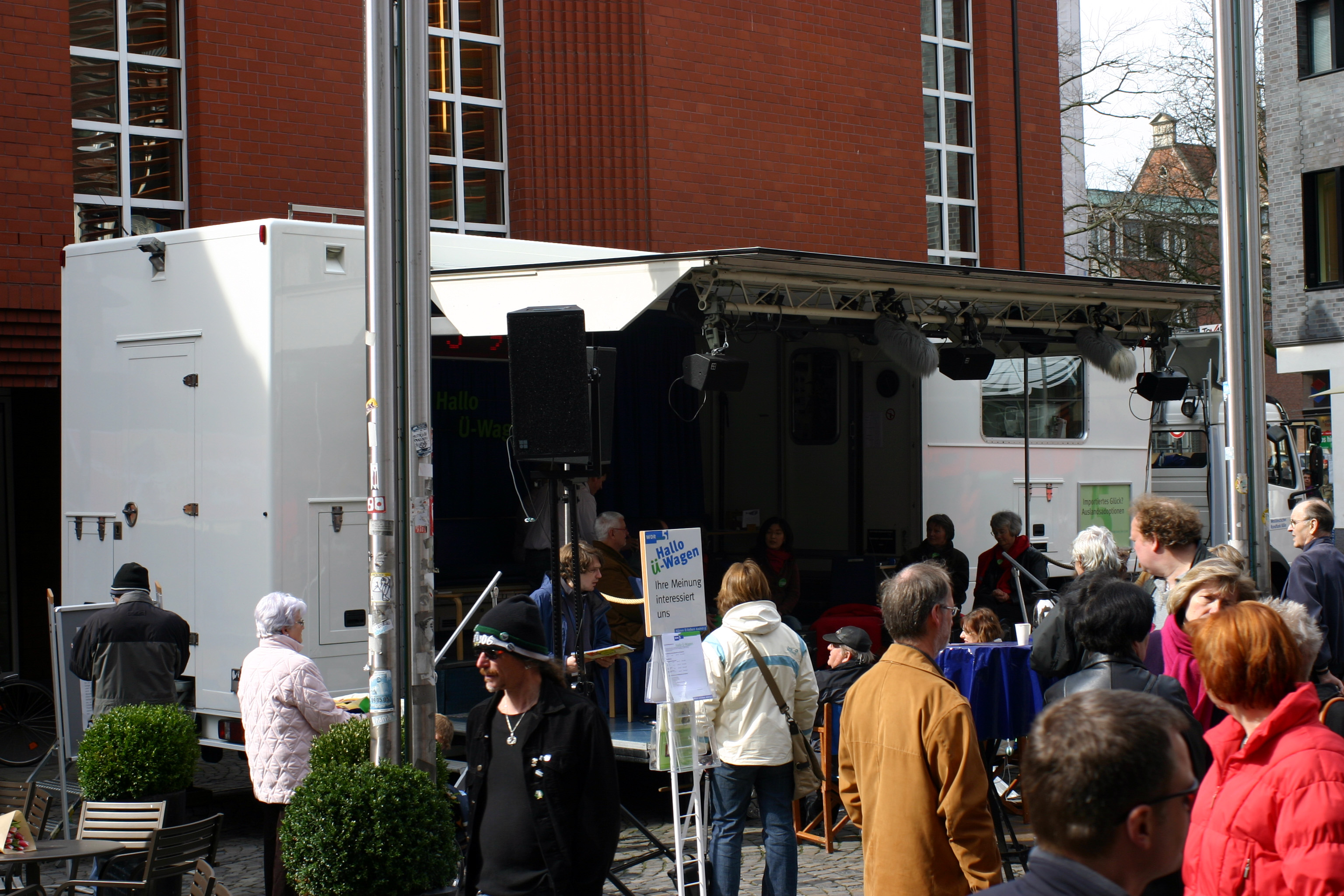
- Hallo Ü-Wagen on 15 April 2006
- Frequency: Weekly
- Country: Germany
- Inaugurated: 1974
- Most recent: 2010
- People: Carmen Thomas

Hallo Ü-Wagen (Hello Radio Van) was a German travelling talk radio show of the WDR. It was presented and directed weekly by Carmen Thomas from 1974 to 1994. In 1990, Forbes named her one of the 100 most influential women in Germany for running it. The series continued until 2010.

== History ==
Carmen Thomas began directing and presenting Hallo Ü-Wagen in 1974. The radio van travelled weekly as a "show on wheels" to different locations, where topics suggested by listeners were discussed with experts in live interviews, with the audience at the location and with listeners via telephone.

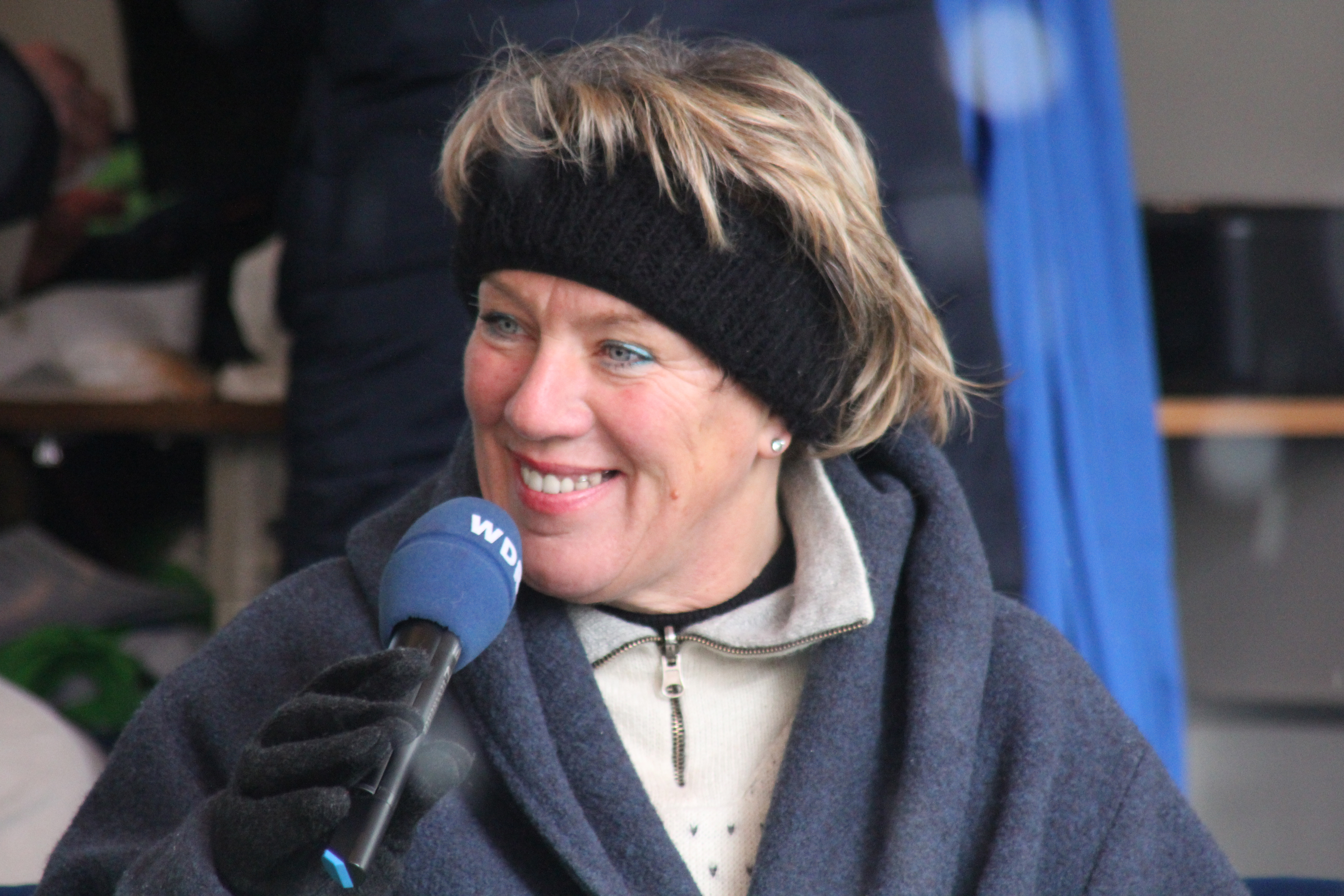
Presenter Julitta Münch in 2010

First broadcast on 5 December 1974, the show was aired regularly each Thursday from 9:20 a.m. to noon on WDR 2. From January 1995, it moved to WDR 5; later in the same year, its time slot moved to Saturday from 11:05 a.m. to 1:00 p.m. Thomas was replaced by Jan Seemann in 1995, and by Julitta Münch from September 1997.

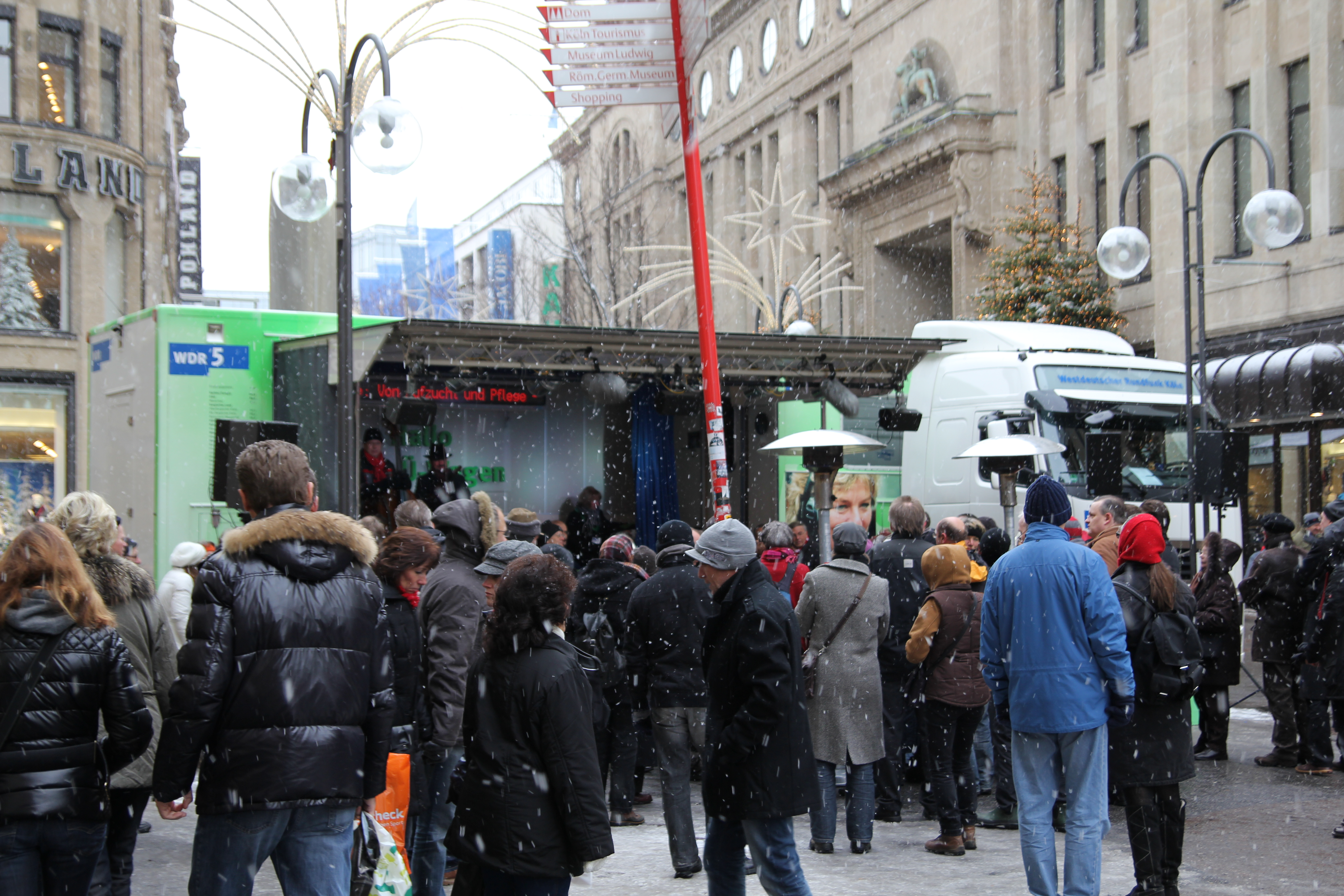
Final broadcast of Hallo Ü-Wagen on 18 December 2010 in Cologne

The regular series continued until 18 December 2010. Afterwards, only individual presentations of the format were aired for specific occasions.

== Format ==
For each broadcast, a radio van (Übertragungswagen, abbreviated Ü-Wagen) of the public broadcaster Westdeutscher Rundfunk (WDR) travelled to a place in North Rhine-Westphalia, often a town, for a live broadcast. The van was nicknamed Violetta because of its colour. A presenter moderated the airing, dedicated to a topic which was normally chosen by the listeners, but sometimes was changed due to political events. Depending on the theme, experts and involved people were invited, sometimes well-known personalities in society, politics and sports.

Each airing began with the reading of feedback to previous broadcasts. After the presenter introduced the new topic in dialogue with people who came to the van's location, the invited experts and guests were introduced and asked to comment on the topic, leading to a discussion among the experts, the live audience and the radio listeners by telephone. Occasionally, live music became part of the airing. The broadcast was interrupted for news.

== Legacy ==
Forbes magazine named Thomas one of the 100 most influential women in Germany in 1990 for Hallo Ü-Wagen. Jürgen Domian, a WDR moderator, called her journalistic work in Hallo Ü-Wagen a model for his live interview series Domian.
