= Harry Valérien =

German sports journalist (1923–2012)

- Born: 4 November 1923; Munich, Germany
- Died: 4 October 2012 (aged 88); Berg, Germany
- Occupation: Journalist
- Writing career
- Subject: Sports

Harry Valérien (4 November 1923 – 12 October 2012) was a German sports journalist.

== Life ==
Valérien was born in Munich on 4 November 1923. decided to become a sports journalist under the impression of the 1936 Olympic Games in Berlin. He started working as a reporter on radio and television in 1949. Valérien was the first sport presenter for the television show das aktuelle sportstudio on German broadcaster ZDF from 1963 to 1988. As part of the das aktuelle sportstudio program, he advocated for honesty in sports and was a champion of the anti-doping movement.

Valérien retired in 1988 after 283 episodes of das aktuelle sportstudio. For forty years he covered the Olympic Games in Germany. His sport topics were swimming, golf, and winter sports. Valérien was married and had two daughters.

Valérien died in Berg on 12 October 2012 at the age of 88.

== Works ==
(in German)

- (together with Christian Zentner): Olympia ’68: Südwest Verlag, Munich (1968)
- (together with Christian Zentner): Fußball ’70: Südwest Verlag, Munich (1970)
- Olympia München 1972. München, Kiel, Sapporo: Südwest Verlag, Munich (1982)
- Fußball 74 – Weltmeisterschaft: Südwest Verlag, Munich (1974)
- (together with Christian Zentner): Olympia 1976. Montreal, Innsbruck: Südwest Verlag, Munich (1985)
- Fußball 78 – Weltmeisterschaft Argentinien: Südwest Verlag, Munich (1978)
- Fußball ’80 – Europameisterschaft, Europapokale, Bundesliga: Südwest Verlag, Munich (1980)
- Olympia ’80. Moskau und Lake Placid: Südwest Verlag, Munich (1982)
- (together with Christian Zentner): Fußball ’82. XII. Weltmeisterschaft vom 13. Juni bis 11. Juli 1982 in Spanien: Südwest Verlag, Munich (1984)
- (together with Christian Zentner): Fußball ’84. V. Europameisterschaft vom 12. bis 27. Juni 1984 in Frankreich. Bundesliga-Pokale: Südwest Verlag, Munich (1986)
- (together with Christian Zentner): Olympia ’84. Los Angeles, Sarajevo: Südwest Verlag, Munich (1986)
- Harry Valériens Sport-Reporte. Bilder, Ereignisse, Dokumente: Südwest Verlag, Munich (1985)
- Fußball ’86. Weltmeisterschaft in Mexiko, (1986)
- (together with Christian Zentner): Fußball-EM ’88 Deutschland. VIII. Fußball-Europameisterschaft von 10. bis 25. Juni 1988: Südwest Verlag, Munich (1988)
- (together with Christian Zentner): Olympia 1988. Seoul, Calgary: Südwest Verlag, Munich (1988)
- Golf, Faszination eines Weltsports: Südwest Verlag, Munich (1989)
- (together with Christian Zentner): Fußball-WM '90 Italien: Südwest Verlag, Munich (1990)
- Olympia '92. Die Winterspiele Albertville: Südwest Verlag, Munich (1992)
- Lillehammer '94. Das Olympiabuch: Sportverlag, Berlin (1994)
- USA '94: Sportverlag, Berlin (1994)
- Atlanta. Das Olympiabuch 1996: Sportverlag, Berlin (1996)

== Awards ==
- 1965, 1976 and 1988: Goldene Kamera
- 1972, 1979 and 1990: Goldener Bambi
- 1981: Goldener Gong
- 1988: Telestar
- 2004: Bayerischer Fernsehpreis
