= Talk radio =

Radio format

Talk radio is a radio format containing discussion about topical issues and consisting entirely or almost entirely of original spoken word content rather than outside music. They may feature monologues, dialogues between the hosts, interviews with guests, and/or listener participation which may be live conversations between the host and listeners who "call in" (usually via telephone) or via voice mail. Listener contributions are usually screened by a show's producers to maximize audience interest and, in the case of commercial talk radio, to attract advertisers.

Talk shows on commercial stations are organized into segments, each separated by a pause for advertisements; however, in public or non-commercial radio, music is sometimes played in place of commercials to separate the program segments.

Variations of talk radio include conservative talk, hot talk, progressive talk, and sports talk.

Talk radio has historically been associated with broadcast radio; however, starting around 2005, the technology for Internet-based talk-radio shows became cost-effective in the form of live internet website streaming and podcasts.

== Africa ==
SW Radio Africa was a pro-democracy station that broadcast out of London from 2001 to 2014.

== Australia ==
In Australia, talk radio is known as "talkback radio".

The most popular talkback radio station historically was Sydney's 2UE, whose populist programs like The John Laws Morning Show, were widely syndicated across the continent. In recent years though, 2UE has been eclipsed by its Sydney rival 2GB after the defection of 2UE most popular talkback host, Alan Jones.

As a result, 2UE and owned by the same company as 2GB) abandoned most of its rigid political and hot topic-driven talkback programming in 2016, moving to a less-serious lifestyle and branded content format, although still maintaining a talkback element.

In Melbourne, 3AW is the highest rating talkback radio station and has also been the highest rating Melbourne radio station for several decades in a row.

6PR personality Garry Meadows was the first announcer to use talkback radio in early 1967. 'Talkback' radio, using a seven-second time-lapse mechanism, began in Australia in April 1967, simultaneously on 2SM, Sydney (with Mike Walsh) and 3DB, Melbourne (with Barry Jones).

Female radio personality, 'Andrea', also began talk-back radio, in 1967, on 2GB in Sydney.

In the 1990s and 2000s, "talkback" on FM was attempted. The Spoonman was a program hosted by Brian Carlton on the triple m network in the late 1990s and returned in 2005 for three and a half years, the show wrapping up in 2008. It was a show that covered many topics, but the "hot talk" format in the U.S. would probably be the best way to describe the program.

Talkback radio has historically been an important political forum in Australia and functions much like cable news television in the United States, with live and "saturated" coverage of political issues.

== Brazil ==
The most important talk radios in Brazil are CBN, Band News and Jovem Pan, which has also sports and news broadcasts.

== Canada ==
In contrast to talk radio stations in the United States, where syndicated programs tend to make up a significant part of most schedules, privately owned Canadian talk radio stations tend to be predominantly local in programming and focus. There is no Canadian content requirement for talk radio, or "spoken word", programming unless the individual station's license expressly stipulates such a requirement; most do not. (In Canada, prospective radio stations may propose certain restrictions on their license to gain favor with the Canadian Radio-television and Telecommunications Commission and have an easier time obtaining a license.)

The most recent nationally syndicated, politically oriented weekday talk radio show in Canada was Charles Adler Tonight, hosted by Charles Adler and heard on eleven stations across the country. After 5 years, the show ended in August 2021. Until 2006, Peter Warren's Warren on the Weekend was heard Saturdays and Sundays. Both programs are or were distributed by the Corus Radio Network and, coincidentally, both hosts had hosted different morning call-in programs in the same time slot on Winnipeg, Manitoba's CJOB 680 before they became nationally syndicated (Adler's show originated from CJOB and retained its original title, while Warren was based in Victoria, British Columbia.) before Charles Adler Tonight, Corus had syndicated Rutherford, hosted by conservative Dave Rutherford and originating from its Calgary station, CHQR. Rutherford is no longer syndicated nationally but continues to air in Calgary, Edmonton, and London.

Other Canadian talk radio programs which have been syndicated to different markets include:

- The George Stroumboulopoulos Show airs on Sunday nights on stations in Toronto and Montreal.
- The Home Discovery Show, a call-in home renovation program hosted by Shell Busey.
- Love and Romance, a relationship advice program hosted by Sue McGarvie.
- Prime Time Sports, a sports talk program hosted by Bob McCown. A three-hour program originating from CJCL, usually only the third hour was broadcast nationally. The show ended in 2019.
- Renovations Cross Canada, a weekend program about home renovations hosted by Ren Molnar. It is the most widely distributed talk radio program in Canada.
- The Roy Green Show, a political and entertainment-based show hosted by Roy Green that airs on Saturday and Sunday afternoons, primarily on the Corus Radio Network.
- The 'X' Zone, a nightly show about paranormal topics hosted by Rob McConnell. It is also syndicated throughout the United States.

Privately owned talk radio syndication networks in Canada are generally formed to share programs across a group of stations with common ownership, although some are formed to distribute their one or two talk radio programs to several stations regardless of ownership. The largest of these is the Corus Radio Network. TSN Radio, the successor to the long-defunct the Team, is one of the newest national networks in Canada, with operations in several major markets.

Syndicated programs from the United States which air on Canadian radio stations are typically non-political shows such as The Kim Komando Show and Coast to Coast AM, as well as sports radio shows from the 24-hour networks in the U.S. Traditionally, politically driven talk radio from the United States does not air on Canadian stations, with a few scattered exceptions (e.g. the now-defunct CFBN, which carried political programming such as the Glenn Beck Program and Dennis Miller, and the also-discontinued talk format of CHAM, which carried Miller). Top political programs such as The Rush Limbaugh Show are never broadcast on Canadian stations, mainly due to high rights fees compared to their relevance to non-American audiences. American stations near the Canadian border can provide many Canadians with access to American talk programs (the signals of Limbaugh affiliates WJR, WBEN, and WHAM, for example, cover almost all of Southern Ontario).

Local talk radio plays a significant role in the politics of Newfoundland and Labrador. Political parties have systematically coordinated call-ins by Members of the House of Assembly when public opinion pollsters are known to be in the field. The provincial government routinely purchases transcripts of calls.

== Finland ==
A state-owned public channel called YLE Puhe. is broadcast throughout the whole country in the Finnish language. The programs include sports and news broadcasts. Its weekly listenership is about 550,000. Finland's first commercial talk station, Radio Rapu, started operations on March 1, 2014.

== France ==
Talk radio is a popular form of radio entertainment in France, exemplified by Europe 1, RTL, and RMC, plus state-owned France Inter. A premier English language talk radio in France is the Gascony Show. Launched in early 2011, this show is broadcast weekly to the Gascony region of the southwest of France, as well as to the rest of France via Internet streaming.

== Germany ==
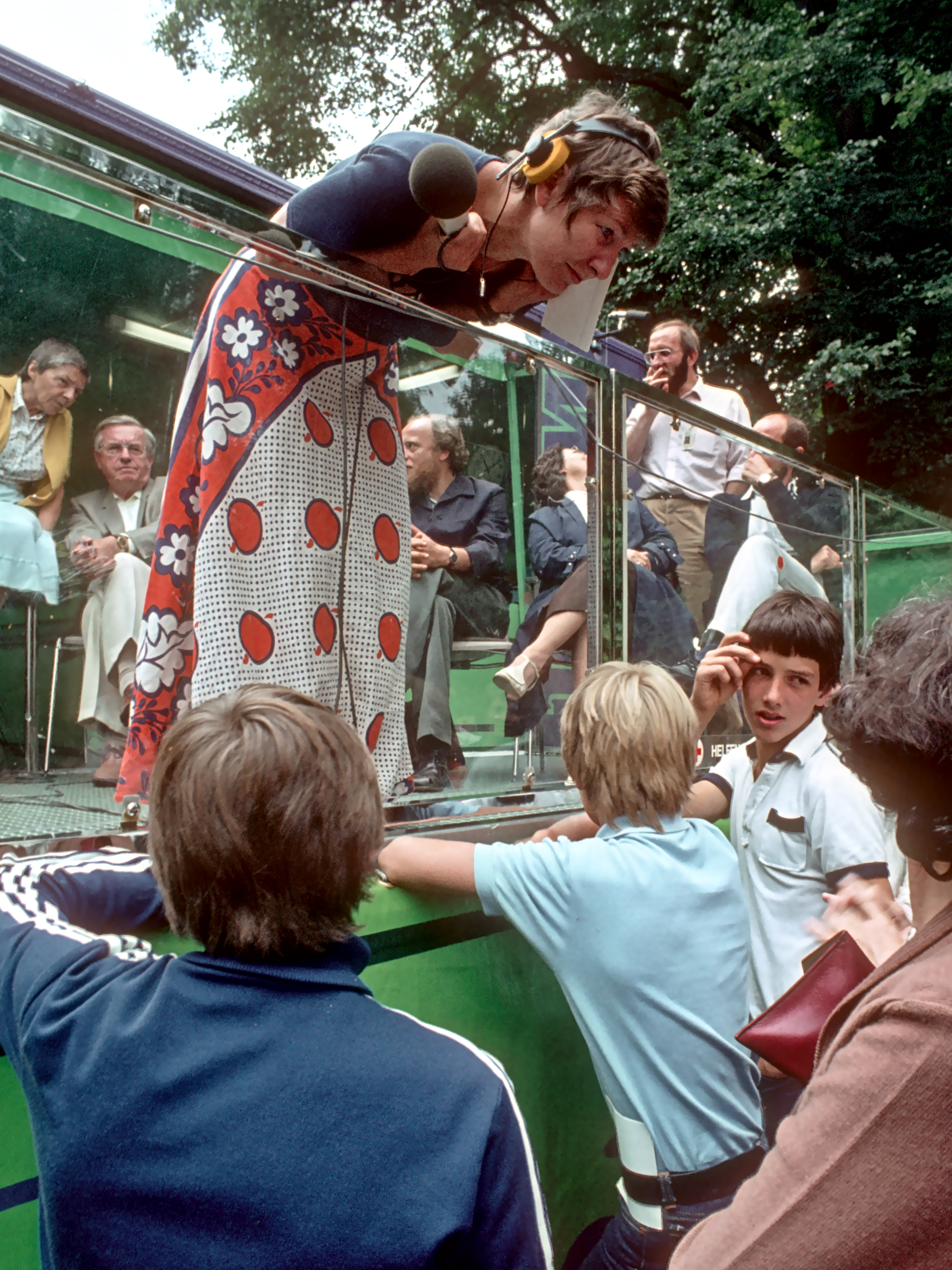
Hallo Ü-Wagen with Carmen Thomas in 1982

Radio talk shows are popular in Germany and have a long tradition. The first talk show on public radio was Werner Höfer's Der Internationale Frühschoppen, a political talk begun in 1952. The talk show on wheels Hallo Ü-Wagen ran from 1974 to 2010, begun by Carmen Thomas for WDR.

== Italy ==
Talk radio in Italy is popular. Radio 24, part of the group Il Sole 24 Ore privately owned by Confindustria, is the most important commercial "news/talk" talk radio station in the country. Its focus is mainly on independent news about the Italian and European economy, finance, culture, and politics, but it also hosts programs focusing on sports, personal finance, music, health, science, technology, and crowdsourced storytelling. State-owned Rai Radio 3 is mainly dedicated to literature, the arts, classical music, and general cultural issues. Several regional stations use a format combining that of all-news and talk radio.

== New Zealand ==
In New Zealand, the talk radio format is popularly known as talkback radio. The major radio network broadcasting in the talk radio format is Newstalk ZB. Sport Nation also largely broadcast in a talk format with Sport Coverage . Other stations such as Radio New Zealand National have a large component of talk-based content but do not have talk-back (i.e. listener phone-ins). Previous Stations Included Radio Live, Today FM Radio Sport and Live Sport, All now Defunct.

Newstalk ZB is the New Zealand market leader, but Radio tried to establish itself with a greater presence in the talk radio market since its inception in 2005, then changing to Magic Talk before closing in 2023.

== Philippines ==
Almost all AM radio stations are talk stations. A few stations from Radio Mindanao Network and Bombo Radyo are on FM. Radyo 5 News FM (now True FM) is the first talk radio station in the Philippines.

== Poland ==
There is two talk radio station in Poland, called TOK FM, which is owned by Agora SA, a Polish media company. Its programmes are broadcast in 10 large cities including Warsaw, Kraków, Gdańsk, Poznań, and Katowice. The programme is also available via the Internet and transmitted by the Hot Bird constellation. It was founded in 1998 as "Inforadio"

Second talk radio station called Radio Wnet, which is owned by Radio Wnet sp. z o.o., a Polish media company. Its programmes are broadcast in two large cities including Warsaw (87.8 MHz), Kraków (95,2 MHz). The programme is available via Internet. It was founded on 25 May 2009 by Krzysztof Skowroński, Grzegorz Wasowski, Katarzyna Adamiak-Sroczyńska and Monika Makowska-Wasowska, Wojciech Cejrowski and Jerzy Jachowicz.

== Spain ==
Talk radio in Spain is very popular, where the most important radio stations are exclusively dedicated to talk shows, such as Cadena Ser, Cadena Cope, Onda Cero, Radio Nacional, or Punto Radio. There is a very wide variety of topics, such as politics, sport, comedy, and culture.

Sport talk shows are particularly relevant, since football attracts a massive interest in Spain, with a special focus on FC Barcelona and Real Madrid CF, and the men's national football team. Typically the programming of main talk radio stations is modified whenever there is a major football event, such as a La Liga or a national team match. Daily late-night sport (football) talk shows are also very relevant, with a very intense competition of the radio stations in this time slot which typically starts around midnight.

Comedy morning talk shows are also very popular in music radio stations (40 principales, M80 radio, Europa FM, and others), where there is strong competition since it is also a very important time slot, when typically people going to the workplace listen to the radio in their cars early in the morning (around 7 am to 8 am).

As Spain has large English-speaking communities from many different countries, it is a natural place for English language talk radio broadcasting.

The first Talk radio station in English was Coastline Radio broadcasting from Nerja, Costa del Sol. It is now a music station. A group of English expats set up OCI International in the early 1990s. Based in Marbella on the Costa del Sol, it was owned by the ONCE National Spanish Network. It provided a link for the English-speaking expats living on the coast, as well as some content for Scandinavian expats. OCI was closed down in 2007 to make way for Radio Europa music. In 2004 REM FM began broadcasting, with shows mostly fronted by former OCI presenters. The station closed in 2008.

In 2008, Talk Radio Europe began broadcasting. It offers a 24-hour schedule of news, interviews, discussion, and debate and is a World Media Partner with BBC World Service and is affiliated to IRN/SKY News. Talk Radio Europe broadcasts in FM on the Costa del Sol, Costa Almeria, Costa Blanca, and across the island of Mallorca in English. It is available on the Internet and all smartphone platforms.

== United Kingdom ==
Talk radio in the United Kingdom is popular, though not as much as music radio. Nationwide talk stations include BBC Radio 4, BBC Radio 5 Live, BBC Radio 4 Extra, Talkradio, Talksport and Times Radio. Regional stations include BBC Radio Scotland and BBC Radio Wales. Many BBC Local Radio stations and some commercial stations offer a talk format, for example, BBC Radio London, the BBC's flagship local station. Other notable commercial talk stations include London's LBC which pioneered the newstalk format in Europe. LBC currently operates two services – LBC, a newstalk station on FM (London) and via several digital platforms nationally including DAB and Freeview; and LBC News, a rolling news station on AM in London and DAB+ nationally. There are many specialised talk services such as Bloomberg, a financial news station, and Asian Radio Live.

Talk radio expanded dramatically when the BBC's monopoly on radio broadcasting was ended in the 1970s with the launch of Independent Local Radio.

Some notable British talk radio presenters include Jenni Murray, John Humphrys, Martha Kearney, Jonathan Dimbleby, Libby Purves, Laurie Taylor, Pam Ayres, Melvyn Bragg, Tommy Boyd, James Whale, Steve Allen, Nick Abbot, Iain Lee, James Stannage, George Galloway, Julia Hartley-Brewer, Ian Collins, John Nicoll, Brian Hayes, Scottie McClue, James O'Brien, Nicky Campbell, and Simon Mayo. Pete Price on CityTalk is also known as the DJ who rushed to the aid of a regular caller who died live on air during a call. Previously, he had kept a teenager talking for 45 minutes before meeting him to convince him not to commit suicide.

== United States ==
Talk radio is most popular on the AM band. "Non-commercial", usually referred to as "public radio", which is mainly located in a reserved spectrum of the FM band, also broadcasts talk programs. Commercial all-talk stations can also be found on the FM band in many cities across the US. These shows often rely less on political discussion and analysis than their AM counterparts and often employ the use of pranks and "bits" for entertainment purposes. In the United States and Canada, satellite radio services offer uncensored "free-wheeling" original programming. ABC News & Talk is an example of "repackaging" for the digital airwaves shows featured on their terrestrial radio stations.

=== History ===
Expressing and debating political opinions has been a staple of radio since the medium's infancy. Aimee Semple McPherson began her radio broadcasts in the early 1920s and even purchased her station, KFSG which went on the air in February 1924; by the mid-1930s, controversial radio priest Father Charles Coughlin's radio broadcasts were reaching millions per week. There was also a national current events forum called America's Town Meeting of the Air which broadcast once a week starting in 1935. It featured panel discussions from some of the biggest newsmakers and was among the first shows to allow audience participation: members of the studio audience could question the guests or even heckle them.

Talk radio as a listener-participation format has existed since the 1930s. John J. Anthony (1902–1970) was an announcer and DJ on New York's WMRJ. It was located in the Merrick Radio Store at 12 New York Boulevard in Jamaica, Long Island. After some marital troubles, refusing to pay alimony and child support, he sought professional help and began his radio series where listeners would call in with their problems in 1930. Radio historians consider this the first instance of talk radio.

While working for New York's WMCA in 1945, Barry Gray was bored with playing music and put a telephone receiver up to his microphone to talk with bandleader Woody Herman. This was soon followed by listener call-ins and Gray is often billed as "the hot mama of talk radio". Herb Jepko was another pioneer.

Author Bill Cherry proposed George Roy Clough as the first to invite listeners to argue politics on a call-in radio show at KLUF, his station in Galveston, Texas, as a way to bring his political views into listeners' homes. (He later became Mayor of Galveston). Cherry gives no specific date, but the context of events and history of the station would seem to place it also in the 1940s, perhaps earlier. The format was the classic mode in which the announcer gave the topic for that day, and listeners called in to debate the issue.

In 1948, Alan Courtney – New York disk jockey and co-composer of the popular song "Joltin' Joe DiMaggio" – began a call-in program for the Storer station in Miami, Florida (WGBS) and then on Miami's WQAM, WINZ and WCKR. The "Alan Courtney Open Phone Forum" flourished as an avowedly conservative and anti-communist political forum with a coverage area over the Southeastern U.S. and Cuba.

Joe Pyne, John Nebel, Jean Shepherd, and Jerry Williams (WMEX-Boston) were among the first to explore the medium in the 1950s.

A breakthrough in talk radio occurred in 1960 at KLAC in Los Angeles. Alan Henry, a broadcaster in his early thirties, had been hired by John Kluge, president of Metromedia in 1963. Henry had previously worked in such diverse markets as Miami, Florida; Waterloo, Iowa; Hartford, Connecticut; and St. Louis, Missouri. KLAC was dead last in the ratings but Kluge wanted a big Metromedia presence in Los Angeles. He sent Henry from New York to Los Angeles to turn KLAC into a success. The first thing that Henry did was hire the legendary morning team of Lohman and Barkley. Henry had built a strong relationship with programmer Jim Lightfoot, who had joined Henry in Miami. A unique opportunity presented itself when Joe Pyne, who had begun his career as a radio talk personality in Pennsylvania, was fired by KABC in Los Angeles. The speculation was that Pyne was too controversial and confrontational for the ABC corporate culture. Henry hired Pyne on the spot and paid him $25,000 a year, which was then a huge salary for a radio personality. Pyne was given the night show on KLAC. Part of the agreement with Pyne was that Henry and Lightfoot would give him broad control of his program content.

The show was an immediate success. Henry encouraged the confrontation with listeners and guests for which Pyne became famous. Pyne coined the line "Go gargle with razor blades," for guests with whom he disagreed. The Pyne show was the beginning of the confrontational talk format that later spread across the radio spectrum. At one point in the 1960s, the Joe Pyne show was syndicated on over 250 radio stations in the United States.

In an odd turn of events, Pyne's radio show led him to television. Henry suggested to John Kluge that Joe Pyne should be put on Metromedia's newly acquired TV station in Los Angeles, KTTV-TV. Kluge told Henry to speak to KTTV-TV general manager Al Kriven, but Henry had already done that, and Kriven had adamantly refused. Kluge telephoned Kriven, and Pyne soon became the nation's first controversial late-night talk television host. The Joe Pyne Show on KTTV-TV quickly shot to the top of the ratings. The format later proliferated on cable television with a variety of new hosts, many of them taking on a similar persona to Joe Pyne. Joe Pyne and Alan Henry were major factors in establishing a new trend in radio and television programming. Alan Henry elaborates on the launching of Joe Pyne on KLAC radio and KTTV-TV in his memoir A Man and His Medium.

Two radio stations – KMOX, 1120 AM in St. Louis, Missouri, and KABC, 790 AM in Los Angeles – adopted an all-talk show format in 1960, and both claim to be the first to have done so. KABC station manager Ben Hoberman and KMOX station manager Robert Hyland independently developed the all-talk format. KTKK, 630 AM in Salt Lake City, then known as KSXX, adopted a full-time talk schedule in 1965 and is the third station in the country to have done so. KSXX started with all local talent, and KTKK, which now airs on 1640 AM, has a larger portion of its schedule featuring local talent than most other stations that run a full schedule of talk.

In the 1970s and early 1980s, as many listeners abandoned AM music formats for the high fidelity sound of FM radio, the talk radio format began to catch on in more large cities. Former music stations such as KLIF (Dallas, Texas), WLW (Cincinnati, Ohio), WHAS (Louisville, Kentucky), WHAM (Rochester, New York), WLS (Chicago, Illinois), KFI (Los Angeles, California), WRKO (Boston, Massachusetts), WKBW (Buffalo, New York), and WABC (New York, New York) made the switch to all-talk as their ratings slumped due to listener migration to the FM band. Since the turn of the 21st century, with many music listeners now migrating to digital platforms such as Pandora Radio, Sirius XM Radio, and the numerous variations of the iPod, talk radio has been expanding on the FM side of the dial as well.

=== Shock ===
Hot talk, also called FM talk or shock talk, is a talk radio format geared predominantly to a male demographic between the ages of 18 and 49. It generally consists of pop culture subjects on FM radio rather than the political talk found on AM radio. Hosts of hot talk shows are usually known as shock jocks.

Clear Channel Communications (which became iHeartMedia in 2015) has a select few hot talk stations under the moniker Real Radio, while CBS Radio once had a larger chain of hot talkers known as Free FM, though the brand was abandoned after a post-Howard Stern attempt to network the format failed within a year. It is usually found on FM radio active rock, classic rock, and country stations in morning drive, as the actual hot talk formatted stations have only achieved mediocre success as a whole compared to AM or conservative talk radio, or even FM music radio. It is also effectively a format that is unviable during an average workday in North America, due to the format's tendency to discuss topics wholly inappropriate for a workplace setting, and outside of discussions of attractiveness, largely repels women as regular listeners.

In March 2018, CBS Radio's corporate successor Entercom (now Audacy, Inc.) attempted a hot talk format in San Diego with KEGY 97.3 The Machine. It featured a weekday lineup devoted to hot talk programs, blocks of classic rock interspersed with comedy bits during off-peak hours, and coverage of San Diego Padres baseball. However, the station attracted controversy later that month, when an advertisement for the station's forthcoming morning show Kevin Klein Live (which invited listeners to "jump ... to a new morning show", accompanied by a picture of the Coronado Bridge) was criticized for glorifying suicide by bridge jumping. The ensuing controversy prompted the Padres to scrutinize KEGY's direction; executive Ron Fowler voiced concerns over the team being associated with KEGY's "shock jock" content, threatening to possibly cut ties with the station and Entercom. Kevin Klein's program never premiered, and the hot talk format was ultimately dropped on April 12, 2018, in favor of a conventional sports format as 97.3 The Fan.

In 2019, JVC Media began to establish a hot talk network in Florida branded as Florida Man Radio (in reference to the "Florida Man" internet meme), beginning with WDYZ in Orlando. The network has picked up personalities such as Shannon Burke and Ed Tyll, with the syndicated Bubba the Love Sponge serving as its morning show. In 2022, after receiving the station in a trade from Audacy, Beasley Broadcast Group's KXTE in Las Vegas shifted to a hot talk format for its weekday lineup, which consists primarily of syndicated morning shows (including Dave and Mahoney, for which it is the flagship station, as well as Free Beer and Hot Wings, and Dave & Chuck the Freak from sister WRIF in Detroit).

The genre has also shown up on satellite radio and in podcasting, which typically have more creative freedom due to the lack of indecency rules and lower reliance on corporate advertising.

Other U.S. hosts specialize in talk radio comedy, such as Phil Hendrie, who voices his fictional guests and occasionally does parodies of other programs.

=== Political ===
The United States saw dramatic growth in the popularity of talk radio during the 1990s due to the repeal of the Federal Communications Commission's post-war Fairness Doctrine of 1949, in 1987. The mandate of the Fairness Doctrine was to require that audiences were exposed to a diversity of viewpoints.

It had required the holders of broadcast licenses to "present controversial issues of public importance" and to do so in a manner that was, in the commission's view, "honest, equitable and balanced". Its repeal provided an opportunity for a kind of partisan political programming with commercial appeal that had not previously existed.

The most successful pioneer in the early 1990s' talk radio movement in the US was the politically conservative commentator Rush Limbaugh. Limbaugh's success demonstrated that there was a nationwide market for a passionately delivered conservative polemic on contemporary news, events, and social trends, and changed the face of how the talk radio business was conducted. Unrestrained (by the Fairness Doctrine), cheering for one's political party, and especially against the other, had become popular entertainment which rapidly changed the way politics nationally was discussed, perceived, and conducted.

Other radio talk show hosts (who describe themselves as either conservative or libertarian) have also had success as nationally syndicated hosts, including Hugh Hewitt, Sean Hannity, Jon Arthur, Glenn Beck, Michael Medved, Laura Ingraham, Neal Boortz, Michael Savage, Bill O'Reilly, Larry Gaiters, and Mark Levin.

The Salem Radio Network syndicates a group of religiously oriented Republican activists, including evangelical Christian Hugh Hewitt and Jewish conservatives Dennis Prager and Michael Medved; these are mostly distributed in a 24-hour network format among Salem's stations, and they generally earn ratings much less than their syndicated counterparts.

In the summer of 2007, conservative talk show hosts mobilized public opposition to the McCain-Kennedy immigration reform bill, which eventually failed. Conservative hosts Limbaugh, Ingraham, Bennett, Prager, Hannity, Beck, Levin, and Hewitt coalesced around endorsing former Massachusetts governor Mitt Romney for president at the end of January 2008 (after Fred Thompson, the described favorite of some of the hosts, dropped out), to oppose the nomination of Senator John McCain; however, Romney suspended his campaign in February of the same year and endorsed McCain. During the primaries, Limbaugh in particular had endorsed a plan to do whatever it took to prolong the Democrats' nomination by encouraging political conservatives to cross over to the Democrats and voting for the trailing candidate, a plan he called "Operation Chaos".

Conservative talk show hosts also lent their unified support for congressional candidate Doug Hoffman, a conservative third-party candidate who was running in New York's 23rd congressional district special election, 2009, against a liberal Republican (Dierdre Scozzafava) and a mainstream Democrat (Bill Owens). The unified support from the conservative base helped propel Hoffman to frontrunner status and effectively killed Scozzafava's campaign, forcing her to drop out of the race several days before the election. This effort backfired on the conservative hosts, as the Democratic candidate Owens won in part thanks to Scozzafava's endorsement of Owens. Local hosts, such as Los Angeles's John and Ken, have also proven effective in influencing the political landscape.

Libertarians such as Dennis Miller (based in Los Angeles), Jon Arthur, host of Jon Arthur Live! (based in Florida), Patti Brooks KGMI (based in the Pacific Northwest), Free Talk Live (based in New Hampshire), Penn Jillette (based in Las Vegas), Jay Severin (based in Boston, Massachusetts), and Mark Davis (based in Fort Worth and Dallas, Texas) have also achieved some success. Many of these hosts also publish books, write newspaper columns, appear on television, and give public lectures.

Politically liberal talk radio aimed at a national audience also emerged in the mid-2000s. Air America, a network featuring The Al Franken Show, was founded in 2004. It billed itself as a "progressive alternative" to the conservative talk radio shows.

Some prominent examples of liberal talk radio shows either previously or currently in national syndication include: Dial Global talk show hosts Ed Schultz (who moved on to hosting on MSNBC and later on RT America), Stephanie Miller, Thom Hartmann, and Bill Press; Norman Goldman (not with Dial Global and is a self-described independent) is still included on syndication stations – see WCPT (AM). Goldman began as the high-rating fill-in host and "Senior Legal Analyst" for Ed Schultz before launching his show; The Young Turks; Fox former co-host of Hannity and Colmes, Alan Colmes, First Amendment Radio Network libertarian host Jon Arthur, and Mike Malloy, progressive radio WFTE FM's Dorothy And Dick, and Premiere's Randi Rhodes (not on radio 2015).

In some markets, local liberal hosts have existed for years, such as the British talk host Michael Jackson (who was on the air at KABC in Los Angeles beginning in 1968 and is currently at KMZT); Bernie Ward in San Francisco; Jack Ellery in New Jersey and Tampa; Dave Ross in Seattle, and Marc Germain in Los Angeles. A few earlier syndicated programs were hosted by prominent Democrats who were not experienced broadcasters, such as Jim Hightower, Jerry Brown, Mario Cuomo, and Alan Dershowitz; these met with limited success, and Air America has been faced with various legal and financial problems.

Air America was sold to a new owner in March 2007, hired well-known programmer David Bernstein, and began its "rebirth." Bernstein subsequently left in early 2008, but the struggling network remained on the air with a revamped line-up.

On January 21, 2010, Air America radio ceased live programming citing a difficulty with the current economic environment and announced that it would file for Chapter 7 bankruptcy production and liquidate itself. The network ended operations on January 25, 2010.

Clear Channel/iHeartMedia, with nearly 1,300 radio stations under its ownership – along with other owners – has in recent years added more liberal talk stations to their portfolio. These have primarily come from the conversion of AM facilities, most of which formerly had adult standards formats. Many complaints (all radio stations are required by the FCC to maintain, in their public files, copies of all correspondence from the public relating to station operations – for a period of three years from receipt) have been received from fans of this musical genre (Tony Bennett, Frank Sinatra, big band music," etc.) – but the left-leaning talk programming leans toward a much younger demographic, a group that advertisers covet. More recently, however, Clear Channel has been dropping liberal formats in favor of their own Fox Sports Radio network. By 2014, most liberal talk stations had abandoned the format, forcing hosts to find other ways to distribute their programming.

Liberal opinion radio has long existed on the Pacifica network, though only available in a small number of major cities, and in formats that people think more often act as a community forum, rather than people who are more acting on their own opinions, and get a bigger audience. One major host to become popular on the network is Amy Goodman, whose Democracy Now! interview and journalism program is broadcast nationwide.

Conservative critics have long complained that the long-format news programming on National Public Radio (NPR) shows a liberal bias, although this was disputed once in 2004 by Fairness and Accuracy in Reporting (FAIR), a progressive media criticism organization, which found that, for example, "representatives of think tanks to the right of center outnumbered those to the left of center by more than four to one: 62 appearances to 15." National Public Radio itself denies any partisan agenda. Politically oriented talk programs on the network are in the mold of Talk of the Nation, which was designed to be a soundboard for the varied opinions of listeners.

While politically oriented talk is still heard on the AM dial (mostly the conservative format), it has seen some expanding onto the FM dial. One notable example was WPGB in Pittsburgh, which switched to a talk format in 2004 after years of having several different music formats, branding itself as "FM News Talk 104.7" due to the relative uncommonness of politically oriented talk on the FM side of the dial even in 2013 while FM talk, in general, has expanded. Owned by Clear Channel and stylized as one of Clear Channel's typical conservative-leaning AM talk stations, WPGB's ratings were steadily high during its time as a talk station, whereas the station's numerous music formats were among the lowest in the Pittsburgh market before switching. Clear Channel, which owns WPGB, has shifted some of their talk stations from full-power FM signals to lower-range translator stations which use AM or HD Radio subchannel stations to originate those broadcasts; WPGB fired its morning show in December 2013 and switched back to music in August 2014, selling the format rights to AM station WJAS.

=== Insults, advice and mystery ===
There had been some precursors for talk radio show stars, such as the Los Angeles-area controversialist Joe Pyne, who would attack callers on his program in the early 1960s – one of his famous insults was "gargle with razor blades"; the similar Bob Grant in New York City; and Wally George in Southern California.

Talk radio also included personal relationship consultants such as Laura Schlessinger and Barbara De Angelis both heard on KFI AM in Los Angeles. Host Larry Elder on KABC (AM) was a lawyer before entering the talk radio market. Leo Laporte offers consumers computer advice. Business and real estate advice shows, paid health supplement presentations and religious programs are widely available.

Paranormal radio shows have had a place on radio for several decades; while the format has never been successful on a full-time basis, it has proven popular in the overnight graveyard slot. Long John Nebel's program was one of the first to devote itself to the concept before it was further fleshed out by Art Bell, whose Coast to Coast AM went on to have comparable popularity to daytime talk hosts of his era. Bell had a long-running, on-and-off relationship with the show he founded, often leaving the show and returning on an erratic basis, also starting up new shows such as Dreamland, Art Bell's Dark Matter, and Midnight in the Desert only to quit them a few weeks into their run; Bell died in 2018. Coast to Coast AM continues with George Noory as the permanent lead host, with a rotating host on weekends. Clyde Lewis and Jason Hawes also host nationally syndicated paranormal shows.

=== Sports ===
Sports talk radio can be found locally and nationally in the US; as of 2013, five national full-time sports talk networks exist. The oldest existing network, dating to 1991, is SportsMap (although it has only been branded as such since 2020 and has rebranded frequently over the years). Market leader ESPN Radio followed shortly thereafter in 1992, followed by Fox Sports Radio c. 2000 and the near-concurrent entries of CBS Sports Radio (now Infinity Sports Network) and NBC Sports Radio in late 2012 and early 2013. Most of these, however, air on weak, low-budget AM stations; the most successful sports talk stations operate primarily with local programs and supplement their programming with the broadcasting of sports events, usually involving the local teams in the major professional sports leagues. This adds significant expenses to the station's operations, and must be balanced carefully with the regular talk schedule, as an incendiary view about the team by a host can lead to that team pulling their broadcasts from the station.

Local stations may also hire personalities with polarizing opinions about sports topics and athletes to make some kind of national impact that might turn off listeners, and in large markets, sports talk stations may be made up of personalities who pay stations for their show time and their advertising, disallowing any natural flow between each program, along with in-station competitions about whose show has the most impact.

=== Ratings ===
Pew researchers found in 2004 that 17% of the public regularly listens to talk radio. This audience is mostly male, middle-aged, and conservative. Among those who regularly listen to talk radio, 41% are Republican and 28% are Democrats. Furthermore, 45% describe themselves as conservatives, compared with 18% who say they are progressive/liberals. In 2011, the Arbitron portable people meter ratings system, compiled data suggesting that out of 11 nationally rated radio formats, talk radio had lost nearly the most market share and ratings continue to slide. In 2013, Arbitron's executive summary noted that " 92% of consumers aged 12 years and older listen to the radio each week" and "news-talk-information and talk-personality remained number one in PPM markets and number two in the rest of the U.S."

Some of the most-listened-to radio programs in the United States are talk radio shows or have talk radio elements like The Sean Hannity Show and All Things Considered.

== See also ==
- Mass media and American politics
