= Norbert König =

German sports presenter (born 1958)

Norbert Konig
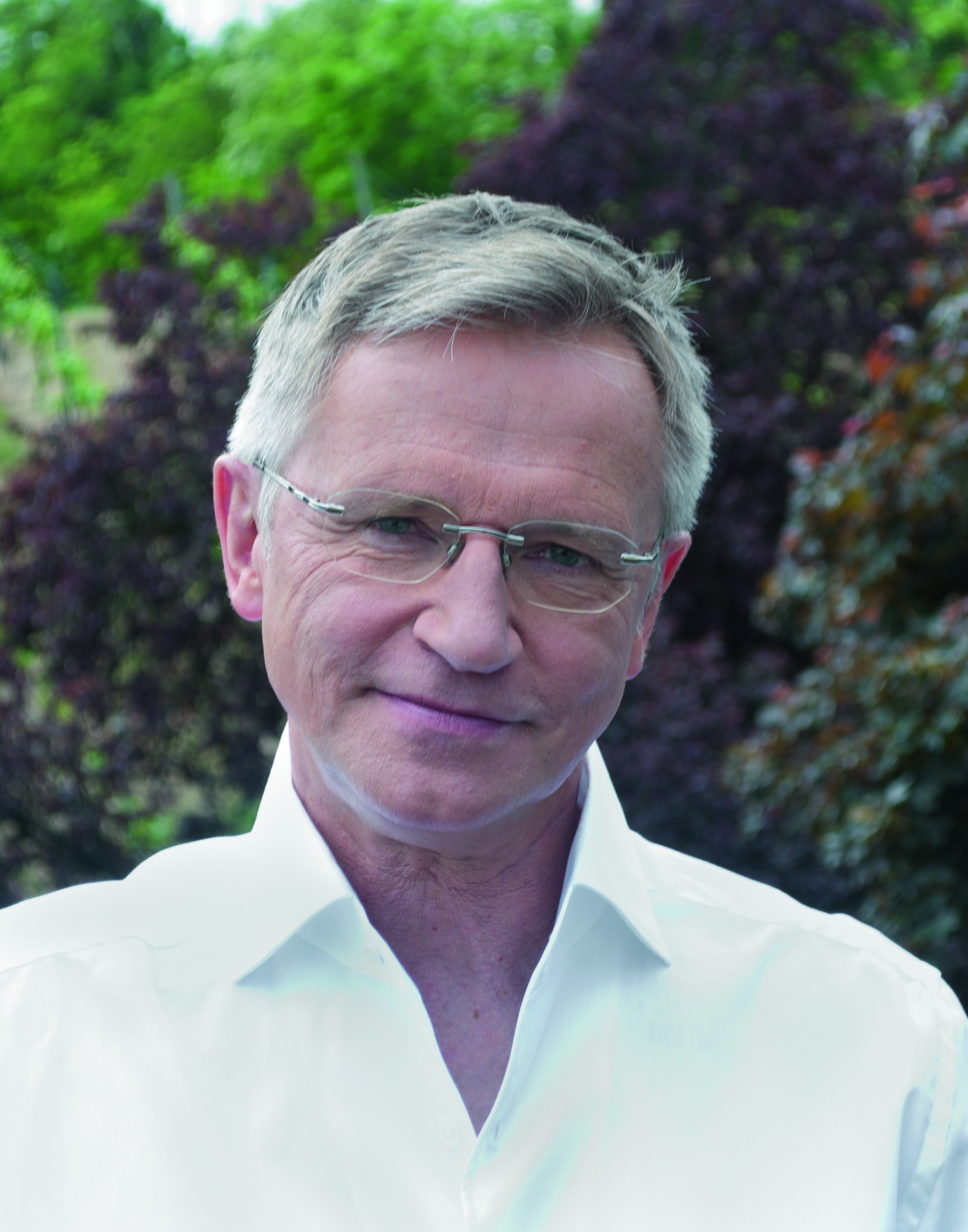
- Image of Norbertf Konig
- Born: Norbert König; 4 September 1958 (age 67); Nordholz-Deichsende, Lower Saxony, West Germany
- Occupation: sports presenter
- Years active: 1987–present
- Height: 5 ft 11 in (1.80 m)

Norbert König (born 4 September 1958) is a German sports presenter.

== Career ==
König finished his abitur at the Amandus-Abendroth-Gymnasium in Cuxhaven. Since 1987, König has presented live television coverage of the Biathlon in winter and Athletics in summer for ZDF.

From 1988 to 2024, König reported on the Summer Olympic Games and the Winter Olympic Games for ZDF.

== Family ==
König is married with two children.
