= Canadian Association of Broadcasters =

Canadian trade association

- Abbreviation: CAB
- Formation: January 28, 1926
- Type: Trade association
- Legal status: active
- Purpose: Represent private broadcasters in Canada.
- Headquarters: Ottawa, Ontario
- Region served: Canada
- Website: www.cab-acr.ca

The Canadian Association of Broadcasters (CAB) is a trade association representing the interests of commercial radio and television broadcasters in Canada. It is co-located with the Canadian Broadcast Standards Council in Ottawa.

It was first established in 1925, with a goal to lobby for Canadian copyright law to contain provisions for the distribution of royalties for music played by radio stations. Following the establishment of the Canadian Broadcasting Corporation, which served as both a broadcaster and regulator, the CAB lobbied for the establishment of an independent regulator of broadcasting in Canada, a goal achieved in 1958 with the formation of the Board of Broadcast Governors. The CAB worked with the BBG to assist in the establishment of private radio and television broadcasters. In the 1970s, the CAB lobbied against attempts by the BBG's successor, the CRTC, to implement policies for Canadian content. In 1998, the CAB established the Canadian Radio Music Awards.

In January 2009, amid growing vertical integration and president Glenn O'Farrell stepping down, the CAB announced that it planned to restructure itself as a "streamlined and effective advocacy association representing private radio and television broadcasters to the federal government". The CAB agreed to form a smaller board devoted to issues affecting the industry as a whole, such as accessibility, copyright, and administrating media-related funds.

== See also ==
- Canadian Communications Foundation
- Canadian Broadcast Hall of Fame
