= Peter Warren (radio) =

Canadian journalist (born 1941)

Peter Warren (born 1941) is a Canadian investigative journalist, private investigator, former talk radio host and member of the Canadian Association of Broadcasters' Hall of Fame.

== Biography ==
Born in London, one of three sons, himself, Tim Warren and John Warren. Warren worked briefly as a junior sports reporter on Fleet Street after being expelled from Dulwich College and then completing his education at Reigate Grammar School. He then moved to Canada where he wrote for various newspapers including The Calgary Herald, The Toronto Telegram, The Winnipeg Tribune (columnist), The Saint John Telegraph-Journal (columnist), The New York Standard. He has also written for Maclean's magazine, The Globe and Mail, The Manchester Guardian, TIME Magazine, and was a staff writer and columnist with The Hong Kong Star. He celebrated 50 years in Canada (all as a journalist) on Nov. 10, 2009.

Warren rose to fame as an "open line" radio talk show host, a career he would enjoy for 35 years, the longest such tenure in North America. Warren moderated the popular Action Line morning talk show on CJOB in Winnipeg, Manitoba from 1971 to 1998;. He moved to Victoria, British Columbia and hosted a syndicated weekend radio program, [Warren on the Weekend] from 1998 to 2006. In March 2006 he left radio to concentrate on his work as an investigative journalist probing cold cases and wrongful convictions. An outspoken critic of the Canadian justice system, Warren had in the past used his show to campaign on behalf of wrongfully convicted persons such as David Milgaard, Steven Truscott, James Driskell, Thomas Sophonow and on behalf of the families of victims of alleged serial killer Robert Pickton. The final edition of Warren on the Weekend aired on March 5, 2006.

== Career highlights and trivia ==
Throughout his career, Warren has been noted for his bold editorials, aggressive interview style and nose for detective work. He has donated personal archives to the University of Manitoba judged to be of "outstanding significance and national importance" by the Canadian Cultural Property Board. He has interviewed seven Canadian prime ministers head-to-head. Former prime minister Pierre Trudeau once said that an interview with him "was worse than Question Period."

- He has gone undercover as a prisoner in a federal penitentiary and as a patient in a psychiatric hospital for investigative purposes. In 1980, after establishing a daily world-exclusive radio interview with Iranian students holding 52 hostages in the American Embassy in Iran, Flora MacDonald, Canadian foreign affairs minister, telephoned and asked him not to air the following day's scheduled broadcast—and, later, the world found out why: in what became known as "the Canadian Caper," six American diplomats were smuggled out of the Canadian embassy with government-endorsed phony Canadian passports and whisked by air to Zurich.

After infiltrating a Ponzi (Pyramid) Scheme meeting at the Marlborough Hotel in Winnipeg, Warren produced a three-part series for The Winnipeg Tribune which resulted in the very first legislation against such practises in North America—for which he was later honored by the University of Mississippi journalism department.

- Four escaped convicts once gave themselves up to him on-the-air.
- In the 1980s, he carried on a lengthy correspondence with convicted child serial killer Clifford Olson.
- Child pornographer Robin Sharpe was a three-time guest on his show.
- His on-air demeanour was occasionally gruff. "Get on with it!" became a trademark phrase he used to prod callers.
- In October, 1999 the Canadian Broadcast Standards Council found that Warren was in breach of the Canadian Association of Broadcasters' Code of Ethics when he stated on-air at CKNW that "Born-again Christians are the scum of the earth."
- He is a former boxer and accredited boxing judge, and has interviewed Muhammad Ali and Rocky Marciano.

Warren has also dabbled in stage acting and narration for film and television.

== Awards and honours ==
- Canadian Association of Broadcasters' Quarter Century Club
- The Province of Manitoba's Order of the Buffalo Hunt
- 1992: 125th Anniversary of the Confederation of Canada Medal
- 1997: Broadcaster of the Year, Western Association of Broadcasters
- 1999: Inducted to the Canadian Association of Broadcasters' Hall of Fame

== Notes and references ==
- CAB Hall of Fame bio
- WAB award recipients
