= Paul Gouin =

Canadian politician (1898–1976)

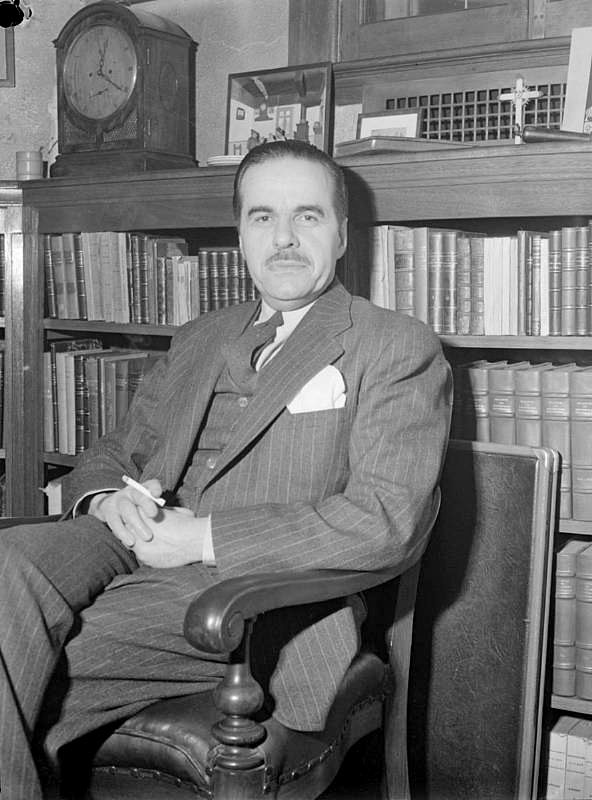
- Paul Gouin in 1945
- Born: May 20, 1898; Montreal, Quebec, Canada
- Died: December 4, 1976 (aged 78); Montreal, Quebec
- Occupation: Politician

Paul Gouin (French pronunciation: [pɔl ɡwɛ̃]; May 20, 1898 – December 4, 1976) was a politician in Quebec, Canada. He was the son of Sir Lomer Gouin and the grandson of Premier Honoré Mercier.

== Life and career ==
He was born in Montreal, Quebec to Lomer Gouin and Éliza Mercier. He fought in World War I as a tank commander, studied at Université Laval, and was admitted to the bar of Quebec in 1920.

Dissatisfied with the direction of the Quebec Liberal Party, he helped found the Action libérale nationale party on June 6, 1934. He soon formed an alliance with Maurice Duplessis's Quebec Conservative Party to contest the 1935 provincial election. Gouin withdrew his support from Duplessis on June 18, 1936, but most members of the ALN caucus sided with Duplessis and joined with his Conservative caucus, which formally merged into the Union Nationale party, which not long afterwards won the 1936 election.

He re-formed the Action libérale nationale and became its leader on July 24, 1938. However, the ALN did poorly in the 1939 election, winning only 4.5% of the popular vote and no seats, and soon disbanded. He helped found the Bloc populaire canadien in 1942 but left it in early 1944 when André Laurendeau was chosen to lead the Quebec wing of the party. In 1952 he succeeded Madame Athanase David as the President of the Montreal Festivals, a post he held through 1956.

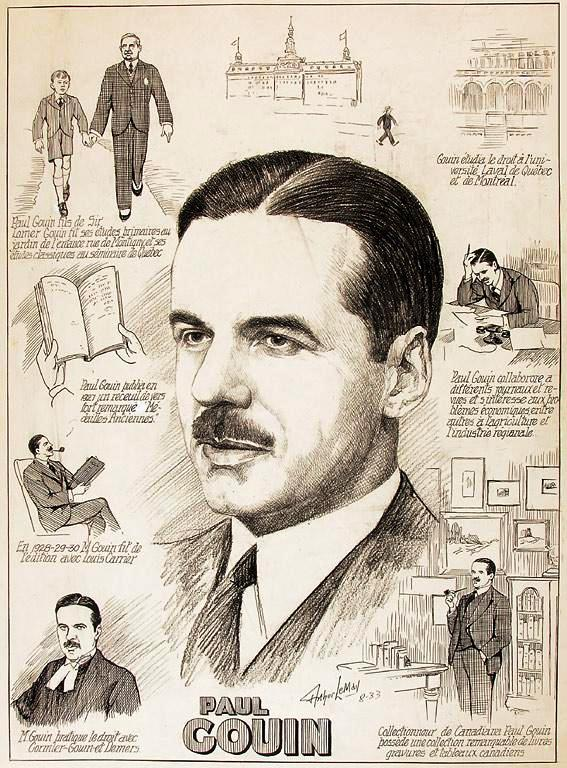
Paul Gouin

== See also ==
- Politics of Quebec
- Quebec general elections
- Timeline of Quebec history

National Assembly of Quebec
Preceded by Walter Reed (Liberal)	MLA, District of L'Assomption; 1935-1936	Succeeded by Adhémar Raynault (Union Nationale)
