= Alphonse Desjardins =

Alphonse Desjardins is the name of:

- Alphonse Desjardins (co-operator) (1854–1920), founder of Mouvement Desjardins credit unions
- Alphonse Desjardins (politician) (1841–1912), mayor of Montreal and Canadian cabinet minister
