= Laurent-Olivier David =

Canadian journalist, lawyer and politician (1840–1926)

The Honourable Laurent-Olivier David
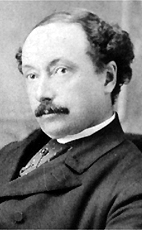

Senator for Mille Isles, Quebec
- In office June 19, 1903 – August 24, 1926
- Appointed by: Wilfrid Laurier
- Preceded by: Louis-Rodrigue Masson
- Succeeded by: Napoléon Kemner Laflamme

Personal details
- Born: March 24, 1840 Sault-au-Récollet, Quebec
- Died: August 24, 1926 (aged 86) Outremont, Quebec
- Resting place: Notre Dame des Neiges Cemetery
- Party: Liberal
- Spouse(s): Albina Chenet (1869–1887); Ludivine Garceau (1892–1915)
- Relations: Paul David, grandson
- Children: Louis-Athanase David
- Occupation: Journalist, newspaper owner, author, lawyer, office holder, and politician

Laurent-Olivier David (March 24, 1840 – August 24, 1926) was a Canadian journalist, lawyer, and politician.

Born in Sault-au-Récollet, Montreal, Quebec, the son of Stanislas David and Élisabeth Tremblay, David was educated at the Petit Séminaire de Sainte-Thérèse and studied law in the Collège Sainte-Marie in Montreal. He was called to the Quebec Bar in 1864 and practiced law with future Premier of Quebec Joseph-Alfred Mousseau until 1872.

In 1862, David became a co-owner and editor of the newspaper the Colonisateur. After the paper ceased publication he became an editor with the paper, L’Union nationale, an antifederalist newspaper which would cease publication in 1867. It was while working at this newspaper that he established a friendship with Wilfrid Laurier which would continue until the end of Laurier's life.

He unsuccessfully ran for the Legislative Assembly of Quebec for the electoral district of Hochelaga in the 1867 election and again in 1875. From 1870 to 1873, he was the editor-in-chief of the Montreal weekly newspaper L’Opinion publique. From 1874 to 1876, he was a co-founder and co-owner of the Le Bien public. In 1878, he was an unsuccessful Liberal candidate for the House of Commons of Canada for the electoral district of Hochelaga. From 1880 to 1884, he was the owner and editor of the newspaper La Tribune.

He was elected to the Legislative Assembly of Quebec in the 1886 election as a Liberal, for the electoral district of Montréal-Est. He did not run in the 1890 election. He was an unsuccessful candidate for the Canadian House of Commons in the 1891 federal election for the riding of Montreal East. He was defeated again when he ran in the 1892 provincial election for the electoral district of Napierville. From 1888 to 1893 he was president of the Association Saint-Jean-Baptiste de Montréal. In 1890, he was made a Fellow of the Royal Society of Canada.

From 1892 to 1918, he was clerk of the Montreal City Council.

He was called to the Senate of Canada for the senatorial division of Mille Isles on the advice of Wilfrid Laurier in 1903. He served until his death in 1926 and was entombed at the Notre Dame des Neiges Cemetery in Montreal. He was awarded the Bene merenti de patria in 1924.

His son Louis-Athanase David and his grandson Paul David both also became senators.

1878 Canadian federal election: Hochelaga
Party	Candidate	Votes	%
Conservative	Alphonse Desjardins	3,039	56.48
Unknown	Laurent-Olivier David	2,342	43.52
Total valid votes		5,381	100.00

His great granddaughter is former Quebec MNA Françoise David.
