= Édouard-Charles St-Père =

Canadian politician

The Honourable Édouard-Charles St-Père

Senator for De Lanaudière
- In office 9 February 1940 – 31 January 1950
- Appointed by: William Lyon Mackenzie King
- Preceded by: Joseph Philippe Baby Casgrain
- Succeeded by: Sarto Fournier

Member of Parliament for Hochelaga
- In office December 1921 – February 1940
- Preceded by: Joseph-Edmond Lesage
- Succeeded by: Raymond Eudes

Personal details
- Born: 24 September 1876 Sainte-Mélanie, Quebec, Canada
- Died: 31 January 1950 (aged 73) Notre-Dame-de-Grâce, Canada
- Party: Liberal
- Spouse(s): 1) Antoinette Collet m. 13 May 1905 (d.); 2) Anna Gingras
- Occupation: journalist

Édouard-Charles St-Père (24 September 1876 – 31 January 1950) was a Liberal party member of the House of Commons of Canada. He was born in Sainte-Mélanie, Quebec at Joliette County and became a journalist who was with the newspaper Le Canada for two decades.

He was first elected to Parliament at the Hochelaga riding in the 1921 general election then re-elected in 1925, 1926, 1930 and 1935. In 1940, St-Père was appointed to the Senate for the De Lanaudière, Quebec division and remained a Senator until his death on 31 January 1950 at his Notre-Dame-de-Grâce, Quebec residence after ailing for a considerable time with an undisclosed condition.

1935 Canadian federal election: Hochelaga
Party	Candidate	Votes	%	±%
Liberal	Édouard-Charles St-Père	19,506	64.60	-3.81
Reconstruction	Hervé Langevin	7,164	23.73	
Conservative	Armand Chevrette	3,524	11.67	-19.92
Total valid votes		30,194	100.00	

1930 Canadian federal election: Hochelaga
Party	Candidate	Votes	%	±%
Liberal	Édouard-Charles St-Père	19,382	68.41	-15.94
Conservative	Joseph-Thomas-Ulric Simard	8,949	31.59	+18.53
Total valid votes		28,331	100.00	
Source: lop.parl.ca

1926 Canadian federal election: Hochelaga
Party	Candidate	Votes	%	±%
Liberal	Édouard-Charles St-Père	16,339	84.35	+8.65
Conservative	Joseph-Thomas-Ulric Simard	2,530	13.06	-11.24
Independent Liberal	Jean-Marie-Mastaï-Georges Cardinal	502	2.59	
Total valid votes		19,371	100.00	

1925 Canadian federal election: Hochelaga
Party	Candidate	Votes	%	±%
Liberal	Édouard-Charles St-Père	14,741	75.70	-13.92
Conservative	Jean-Baptiste Bumbray alias Jean Edouard Charles	4,732	24.30	+13.92
Total valid votes		19,473	100.00	

1921 Canadian federal election: Hochelaga
Party	Candidate	Votes	%	±%
Liberal	Édouard-Charles St-Père	20,164	89.62	-4.59
Conservative	Joseph Rosario Léo Ayotte	2,335	10.38	
Total valid votes		22,499	100.00	

Note: Liberal vote is compared to Opposition vote in 1917 election.
