= Joseph Lesage =

Joseph Lesage may refer to:

- Joseph Arthur Lesage (1881–1950), member of the Senate of Canada
- Joseph Edmond Lesage (1871–1941), member of the House of Commons of Canada
