= Raymond Eudes =

Canadian politician

The Hon. Raymond Eudes
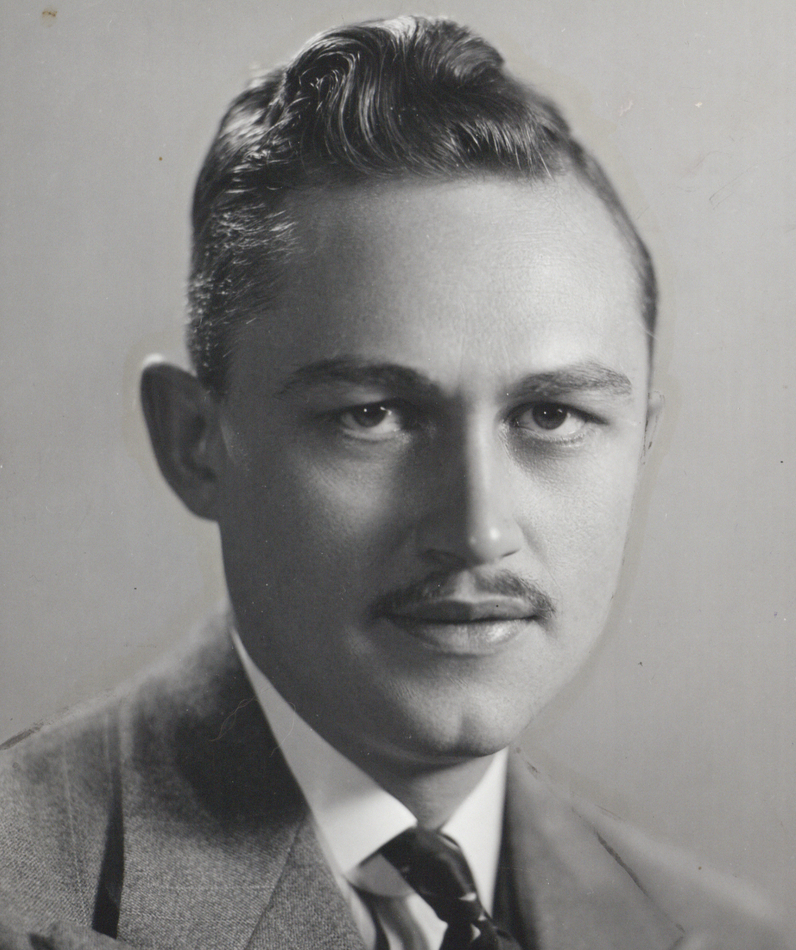

Senator from De Lorimier, Quebec
- In office 8 April 1968 – 25 October 1980
- Appointed by: Lester B. Pearson
- Preceded by: Thomas Vien
- Succeeded by: Philippe Gigantès

Member of the Canadian Parliament for Hochelaga
- In office 1940–1965
- Preceded by: Édouard-Charles St-Père
- Succeeded by: Gérard Pelletier

Personal details
- Born: Raymond Pierre Eudes; 10 October 1912 Montreal, Quebec
- Died: 25 October 1980 (aged 68)
- Party: Liberal
- Profession: lawyer

Raymond Pierre Eudes (10 October 1912 – 25 October 1980) was a French Canadian lawyer and politician.

Born in Montreal, Quebec, he was a lawyer before being elected to the House of Commons of Canada in the riding of Hochelaga in the 1940 election. A Liberal, he was re-elected in 1945, 1949, 1953, 1957, 1958, 1962, and 1963. He stepped down for the 1965 election to allow Gérard Pelletier to run. He was summoned to the Senate of Canada in 1968 representing the senatorial division of De Lorimier, Quebec. He served until his death in 1980.

== Electoral record ==
1963 Canadian federal election: Hochelaga
Party	Candidate	Votes	%	±%
Liberal	Raymond Eudes	13,093	46.36	-4.09
Social Credit	Fernand Bourret	7,535	26.68	+17.60
Progressive Conservative	J.-Marius Heppell	3,892	13.78	-15.92
New Democratic	Arthur Lamoureux	3,394	12.02	+2.57
Communist	Jeannette Pratte	327	1.16	-0.17
Total valid votes		28,241	100.00	

1962 Canadian federal election: Hochelaga
Party	Candidate	Votes	%	±%
Liberal	Raymond Eudes	13,220	50.45	-2.21
Progressive Conservative	Yvon Groulx	7,784	29.70	-10.78
New Democratic	Noël Langlois	2,475	9.44	+5.37
Social Credit	Robert Leblanc	2,379	9.08	
Communist	Samuel Walsh	347	1.32	-1.46
Total valid votes		26,205	100.00	

1958 Canadian federal election: Hochelaga
Party	Candidate	Votes	%	±%
Liberal	Raymond Eudes	16,706	52.65	-23.28
Progressive Conservative	Benoît Gonthier	12,845	40.48	+25.52
Co-operative Commonwealth	Armand Sauvé	1,294	4.08	+1.15
Labor–Progressive	Camille Dionne	883	2.78	-3.39
Total valid votes		31,728	100.00	

1957 Canadian federal election: Hochelaga
Party	Candidate	Votes	%	±%
Liberal	Raymond Eudes	20,611	75.93	-0.36
Progressive Conservative	Benoît Gonthier	4,063	14.97	-0.40
Labor–Progressive	Gérard Fortin	1,675	6.17	+2.70
Co-operative Commonwealth	Lucien Pépin	796	2.93	-1.95
Total valid votes		27,145	100.00	

1953 Canadian federal election: Hochelaga
Party	Candidate	Votes	%	±%
Liberal	Raymond Eudes	19,467	76.29	+8.93
Progressive Conservative	Jean Jodoin	3,921	15.37	-11.11
Co-operative Commonwealth	Roger Beaudin	1,245	4.88	
Labor–Progressive	Camille Dionne	885	3.47	
Total valid votes		25,518	100.00	

1949 Canadian federal election: Hochelaga
Party	Candidate	Votes	%	±%
Liberal	Raymond Eudes	17,633	67.36	+5.11
Progressive Conservative	Joseph-Omer Ravary	6,930	26.47	+20.35
Union des électeurs	Roméo Dagenais	1,615	6.17	+4.69
Total valid votes		26,178	100.00	

1945 Canadian federal election: Hochelaga
Party	Candidate	Votes	%	±%
Liberal	Raymond Eudes	22,444	62.25	+8.42
Bloc populaire	Raymond Godin	7,915	21.95	
Independent	Jean-Paul Chauvin	2,264	6.28	-23.02
Progressive Conservative	Achille Dubeau	2,208	6.12	-6.81
Co-operative Commonwealth	Noël-Émile Bourassa	692	1.92	
Social Credit	Léopold Gendron	533	1.48	
Total valid votes		36,056	100.00	

Note: Progressive Conservative vote is compared to "National Government" vote in 1940 election.

1940 Canadian federal election: Hochelaga
Party	Candidate	Votes	%	±%
Liberal	Raymond Eudes	16,849	53.83	-10.77
Independent Liberal	Jean-Paul Chauvin	9,172	29.30	
National Government	Achille Dubeau	4,049	12.94	+1.26
Independent Liberal	Richard Thibault	1,230	3.93	
Total valid votes		31,300	100.00	

Note: "National Government" vote is compared to Conservative vote in 1935 election.
