= Marie-Gabrielle Ménard =

Canadian politician

Marie-Gabrielle Ménard MP

Member of Parliament for Hochelaga—Rosemont-Est
- Incumbent
- Assumed office April 28, 2025
- Preceded by: Soraya Martinez Ferrada

Personal details
- Party: Liberal
- Education: Collège Montmorency
- Website: mariegabriellemenard.liberal.ca

Marie-Gabrielle Ménard MP is a Canadian politician from the Liberal Party of Canada. She was elected Member of Parliament for Hochelaga—Rosemont-Est in the 2025 Canadian federal election. She is also known as a performance artist and was a reporter for CBC.

== Career ==
Ménard graduated from Collège Montmorency in 2001 and the Montreal School of Contemporary Dance in 2005. As a trained dancer she founded her own contemporary dance studio. In June 2018, she became an arts reporter for Radio-Canada in Winnipeg. She hosted the show Les matins de l'Ouest. In January 2020 she began hosting the show L'Actuel on Radio-Canada Manitoba.

== Electoral record ==
2025 Canadian federal election: Hochelaga—Rosemont-Est
Party	Candidate	Votes	%	±%	Expenditures
Liberal	Marie-Gabrielle Ménard	23,601	46.14	+7.71	$80,565.74
Bloc Québécois	Rose Lessard	13,902	27.18	−4.24	$39,128.35
New Democratic	Julie Girard-Lemay	6,671	13.04	−7.24	$49,738.87
Conservative	Carl Belley	5,402	10.56	+5.86	$3,025.20
Green	Jacob Pirro	1,329	2.60	+0.60	none listed
Marxist–Leninist	Christine Dandenault	242	0.47	+0.30	$0.00
Total valid votes/expense limit		51,147	98.43	+0.22	$127,451.88
Total rejected ballots		818	1.57	–0.22	
Turnout		51,965	65.52	+4.14	
Eligible voters		79,314			
Liberal notional hold		Swing		+5.97	
Source: Elections Canada
Note: number of eligible voters does not include voting day registrations.
