= Gérard Pelletier =

Canadian journalist, intellectual and politician

The Honourable Gérard Pelletier PC CC

Canadian Ambassador to the United Nations
- In office August 1981 – July 1984
- Prime Minister: Pierre Trudeau; John Turner
- Preceded by: Michel Dupuy
- Succeeded by: Stephen Lewis

Canadian Ambassador to France
- In office September 4, 1975 – July 17, 1981
- Prime Minister: Pierre Trudeau; Joe Clark
- Preceded by: Léo Cadieux
- Succeeded by: Michel Dupuy

Minister of Communications
- In office November 27, 1972 – August 28, 1975
- Prime Minister: Pierre Trudeau
- Preceded by: Robert Stanbury
- Succeeded by: Pierre Juneau
- Acting; May 11, 1971 – August 11, 1971
- Prime Minister: Pierre Trudeau
- Preceded by: Jean-Pierre Côté (acting)
- Succeeded by: Robert Stanbury

Secretary of State for Canada
- In office July 6, 1968 – November 26, 1972
- Prime Minister: Pierre Trudeau
- Preceded by: Jean Marchand
- Succeeded by: Hugh Faulkner

Minister without portfolio
- In office April 20, 1968 – July 5, 1968
- Prime Minister: Pierre Trudeau

Member of Parliament for Hochelaga
- In office November 8, 1965 – August 29, 1975
- Preceded by: Raymond Eudes
- Succeeded by: Jacques Lavoie

Personal details
- Born: June 21, 1919 Victoriaville, Quebec, Canada
- Died: June 22, 1997 (aged 78) Montreal, Quebec, Canada
- Party: Liberal
- Spouse: Alexandrine ”Alec” Leduc (m. 1943)
- Children: 4
- Education: University of Montreal; University of St. Michael's College
- Occupation: Journalist; politician

Gérard Pelletier PC (French: [pɛltje]; June 21, 1919 – June 22, 1997) was a Canadian politician, diplomat and journalist from Quebec, best known for his association with Canadian prime minister Pierre Trudeau that started decades before their entries to the political arena. A long time personal confidant of Trudeau, Pelletier served in Trudeau's cabinet and then in two key diplomatic postings.

== Early life and career ==
Pelletier grew up as one of 8 children in a working-class family. He was educated at the Nicolet Seminary, Collège Mont-Laurier, and the Université de Montréal, where he met fellow student Pierre Trudeau.

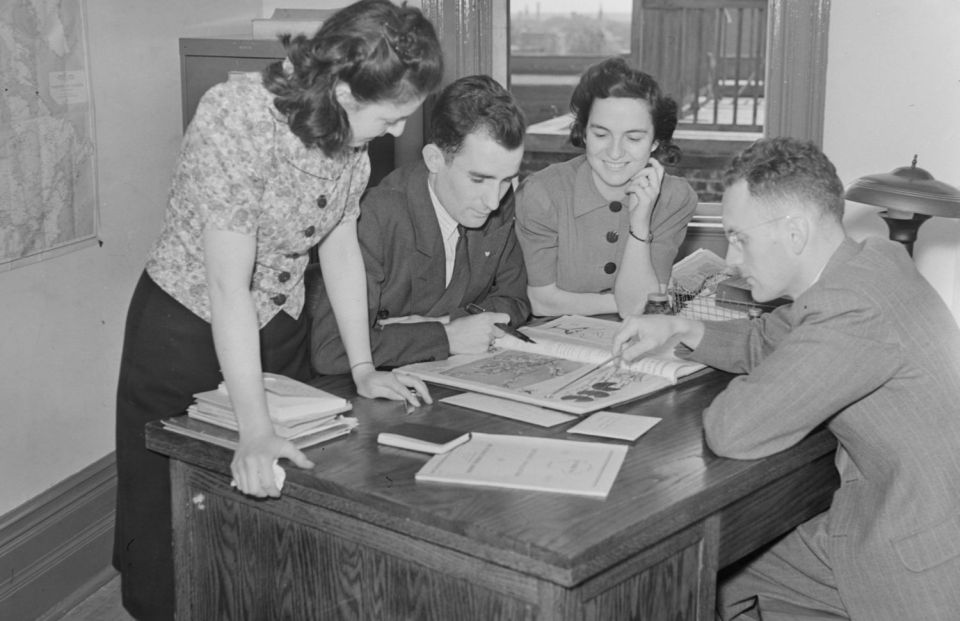
Gérard Pelletier (second from left) in 1941, at the headquarters of the Catholic Student Youth

Pelletier served as secretary-general of Quebec's Jeunesse étudiante catholique from 1939 to 1943. He later worked in Geneva, Switzerland as a field secretary of the World Student Relief organization.

Pelletier returned to Montreal in 1947 where he became a reporter for Le Devoir, a French-language newspaper in Montreal, Quebec. His reporting of the 1949 Asbestos Strike in Quebec helped accelerated his journalist career and led him to the position of director for the journal of the Catholic Workers Confederation of Canada (later Confederation of National Trade Unions (CNTU)). In 1950 Pelletier, with other French-Canadian intellectuals, Pierre Elliott Trudeau included, founded the journal Cité Libre, a magazine voicing opposition to the socially regressive and antidemocratic policies of the government of Maurice Duplessis as well as the clericalism of the Quebec Catholic Church.

In 1961 he became editor-in-chief of the Montreal daily and North America's largest French circulating newspaper, La Presse. After a prolonged strike in 1964, the owners of La Presse fired him for his radical editorial views.

In 1964 he made a small appearance in Denis Héroux's student film Over My Head (Jusqu'au cou), as himself in a political debate.

== Political career ==
=== The Three Wise Men ===
Pelletier met Trudeau while studying in France and worked with him and Jean Marchand during the Asbestos Strike of 1949 in Quebec. Dubbed the "Three Wise Men" in English and Les trois colombes (The three doves) in French, the trio was recruited by Liberal prime minister Lester Pearson in the 1965 election to help derail the rising Quebec separatist movement. Pelletier contested Hochelaga, then considered a safe seat where the Liberals has won majority of the vote in all but one election since World War I (Pelletier won the district four times but only with majority of the vote once, in the 1968 Trudeaumania election) while Trudeau contested Mount Royal, another safe seat.

Following the Liberal victory, Marchand, having gained as leader of the 1949 Strike, entered cabinet immediately, and Trudeau was promoted into cabinet in 1967 following a stint as parliamentary secretary to Pearson. Pelletier served during his first term as parliamentary secretary to the Secretary of State for External Affairs Paul Martin. In this role, he spearheaded passage of the Official Languages Act through Parliament in 1969.

Being Martin's subordinate made an uncomfortable situation for Pelletier while he prepared his friend Trudeau's bid in the lead up to the 1968 Liberal leadership contest. The runner up to Pearson on the previous leadership contest, Martin was widely expected to contest the leadership again upon Pearson's retirement, and exerted considerable pressure on Pelletier for his support and intelligence on young potential rival. It was reported that Martin sent his son, the future Prime Minister Paul Martin, to convey to Pelletier that he wanted to be identified with the "leading wing of the party and not with the old guard."

=== Trudeau ministry ===
He served in various cabinet posts in the first Trudeau ministry. He entered cabinet as a minister without portfolio immediately following Trudeau's leadership victory in 1968. He was appointed Secretary of State for Canada in the post election shuffle in July. Following the 1972 election, he was appointed Minister of Communications in the post election shuffle, serving until 1975.

=== Post politics ===
He left parliament in 1975. He was appointed Canada's ambassador to France (1975–81) and then Permanent Representative to the United Nations (1981–84).

In 1984, Pelletier became chairman of the board of the National Museums of Canada, a post he held until retiring from public life in 1987.

== Honour ==
In 1978 he was made a Companion of the Order of Canada.

== Bibliography ==
=== As author ===
- — (1945). J. E. C. d'aujourd'hui : une étude sur le mouvement. Montreal: Centrale de la Jeunesse étudiante catholique. OCLC 465845812.
- —; Pelletier, Alec (1945). Quartier Nord. (illustrations by Julien Hébert). Montreal: Éditions Fides.
- — (1950). Histoire des enfants tristes : un reportage sur l'enfance sans soutien dans la province de Québec. Montreal: L'Action nationale. OCLC 49083264.
- — (1962). Le concept d'élasticité chez Marshall et quelques auteurs (Maîtrise). Université Laval.
- — (1965). Confederation at the crossroads. Saskatoon: University of Saskatchewan.
- — (1971). La crise d'octobre. Montreal: Éditions du Jour. OCLC 299724407.
- — (1983). Les années d'impatience : 1950-1960. Montreal: Éditions A. Stanké. ISBN 2-76040214-2.
- — (1983–1992). Souvenirs. Montreal: Éditions A. Stanké. (in three volumes)
- — (1985). Years of impatience: 1950 - 1960. Toronto: Methuen. ISBN 978-0-458-98270-7.
- — (1986). Le temps des choix, 1960-1968. Montreal: Éditions A. Stanké. ISBN 2-76040288-6.
- — (1992). Aventure du pouvoir, 1968-1975. Montreal: Éditions A. Stanké. ISBN 2-76040422-6.
- —; Hill, Heather (1995). Le diplomate et l'Africain. Montreal: Éditions A. Stanké. ISBN 2-76040491-9.

=== Contributions ===
- Lamonde, Yvan, ed. (1991). Cité libre : une anthologie. (with the collaboration of Gérard Pelletier). Montreal: Éditions A. Stanké. ISBN 2-76040379-3.

== Electoral record ==
1974 Canadian federal election: Hochelaga
Party	Candidate	Votes	%	±%
Liberal	Gérard Pelletier	10,561	49.86	+5.52
Progressive Conservative	Jacques Lavoie	6,435	30.38	+5.91
Social Credit	Lucien Mallette	2,258	10.66	
New Democratic	Roger Hébert	1,461	6.90	-10.92
Independent	Jean Poitras	190	0.90	
Marxist–Leninist	Robert Lévesque	181	0.85	
Communist	Guy Désautels	95	0.45	
Total valid votes		21,181	100.00	
lop.parl.ca

1972 Canadian federal election: Hochelaga
Party	Candidate	Votes	%	±%
Liberal	Gérard Pelletier	11,235	44.34	-10.80
Progressive Conservative	Jacques Lavoie	6,199	24.47	-1.64
New Democratic	Raymond-Gérard Laliberté	4,515	17.82	+5.07
Independent	Gérard Contant	2,171	8.57	
Independent	Jacques Ferron	879	3.47	
Independent	Françoise Lévesque	338	1.33	
Total valid votes		25,337	100.00	

1968 Canadian federal election: Hochelaga
Party	Candidate	Votes	%	±%
Liberal	Gérard Pelletier	12,080	55.14	+7.39
Progressive Conservative	Michel Gagnon	5,720	26.11	+6.49
New Democratic	René Nantel	2,793	12.75	-6.88
Ralliement créditiste	Dollard Desormeaux	1,122	5.12	-8.83
Communist	Jeannette Walsh	192	0.88	
Total valid votes		21,907	100.00	

1965 Canadian federal election: Hochelaga
Party	Candidate	Votes	%	±%
Liberal	Gérard Pelletier	11,929	47.76	+1.39
New Democratic	Claude Richer	4,902	19.62	+7.61
Progressive Conservative	Marius Heppell	4,662	18.66	+4.88
Ralliement créditiste	Fernand Bourret	3,486	13.96	-12.73
Total valid votes		24,979	100.00	

Note: Ralliement créditiste vote is compared to Social Credit vote in the 1963 election.

Parliament of Canada
Preceded by Raymond Eudes	Member of Parliament for Hochelaga; 1965–1975	Succeeded by Jacques Lavoie
Diplomatic posts
Preceded by Joseph Alphonse Léo Cadieux	Canadian Ambassador to France; 1975–1981	Succeeded by Michel Dupuy
Preceded by Michel Dupuy	Canadian Ambassador to the United Nations; 1981–1984	Succeeded by Stephen Lewis
