= Hochelaga—Rosemont-Est =

Federal electoral district in Quebec, Canada

Coordinates: 45.569°N 73.550°W

Quebec electoral district
- Interactive map of riding boundaries from the 2025 federal election

Federal electoral district
- Legislature: House of Commons
MP
Marie-Gabrielle Ménard
Liberal
- District created: 2003
- First contested: 2004
- Last contested: 2025
- District webpage: profile, map

Demographics
- Population (2016): 106,496
- Electors (2019): 82,504
- Area (km²): 20
- Pop. density (per km²): 5,324.8
- Census division: Montreal
- Census subdivision: Montreal (part)

Hochelaga—Rosemont-Est (formerly known as Sainte-Marie, Montreal—Sainte-Marie and Hochelaga) is a federal electoral district in Quebec, Canada, that has been represented in the House of Commons of Canada from 1867 to 1988 and since 2004.

== Geography ==
The district includes the neighbourhood of Hochelaga-Maisonneuve and the western part of the neighbourhood of Longue-Pointe in the Borough of Mercier–Hochelaga-Maisonneuve, the eastern part of the neighbourhood of Rosemont in the Borough of Rosemont–La Petite-Patrie and the eastern part of the neighbourhood of Centre-Sud in the Borough of Ville-Marie.

=== Political geography ===
Until 2011, this working class riding strongly favoured the Bloc, which in 2008, won most polls.

The New Democrats placed second in the 2009 by-election; as in much of Quebec, Bloc support collapsed in the 2011 election and the New Democrats swept the riding. The NDP held onto the riding in the 2015 election. Since 2019 it has been held by the liberals with ever increasing margins.

== Demographics ==
According to the 2006 Canadian census

- Ethnic groups: 83.5% White, 4.5% Black, 2.8% Latin American, 2.5% Arab, 2.2% Chinese, 1.9% Southeast Asian, 1.0% South Asian
- Religions: (2001) 80.9% Catholic, 3.1% Protestant, 2.2% Muslim, 1.4% Buddhist, 1.4% Christian Orthodox, 9.4% No religion
- Average income: $20,781

According to the 2016 Canadian census

- Twenty most common mother tongue languages (2016) : 75.8% French, 4.1% Spanish, 3.7% Arabic, 3.6% English, 1.5% Portuguese, 1.4% Italian, 1.1% Creole languages, 1.1% Vietnamese, 0.9% Kabyle, 0.8% Mandarin, 0.6% Cantonese, 0.5% Russian, 0.5% Romanian, 0.4% Polish, 0.3% Bengali, 0.3% Ukrainian, 0.3% Greek, 0.2% Khmer, 0.2% Farsi, 0.2% Tamil, 0.2% Lingala

== History ==
The electoral district of Hochelaga was created in 1867 covering the entire eastern part of the Island of Montreal. In 1976, it was renamed "Sainte-Marie". In 1981, it was renamed "Montreal—Sainte-Marie".

The riding was abolished in 1987 when it was redistributed into Laurier—Sainte-Marie and Rosemont ridings.

Hochelaga riding was recreated in 2003 from parts of Hochelaga—Maisonneuve and Laurier—Sainte-Marie ridings.

This riding lost territory to Laurier—Sainte-Marie and Saint-Léonard—Saint-Michel, and gained territory from La Pointe-de-l'Île and Honoré-Mercier during the 2012 electoral redistribution.

Following the 2022 federal electoral redistribution the riding was renamed Hochelaga—Rosemont-Est. The boundary with Saint-Léonard—Saint-Michel along Rue Bélanger was moved to the borough boundary between Rosemont—La-Petite-Patrie and Saint-Léonard. These changes came into effect upon the calling of the 2025 Canadian federal election.

=== Members of Parliament ===
This riding has elected the following members of Parliament:

Parliament	Years	Member	Party
Hochelaga
1st	1867–1872	Antoine-Aimé Dorion	Liberal
2nd	1872–1874	Louis Beaubien	Conservative
3rd	1874–1878	Alphonse Desjardins	Conservative
4th	1878–1882	Alphonse Desjardins	Conservative
5th	1882–1887	Alphonse Desjardins	Conservative
6th	1887–1891	Alphonse Desjardins	Conservative
7th	1891–1892	Alphonse Desjardins	Conservative
7th	1892–1896	Séverin Lachapelle	Conservative
8th	1896–1900	Joseph Alexandre Camille Madore	Liberal
9th	1900–1903	Joseph Alexandre Camille Madore	Liberal
9th	1904–1904	Louis-Alfred-Adhémar Rivet	Liberal
10th	1904–1908	Louis-Alfred-Adhémar Rivet	Liberal
11th	1908–1911	Louis-Alfred-Adhémar Rivet	Liberal
12th	1911–1915	Louis Coderre	Conservative
12th	1915–1917	Esioff-Léon Patenaude	Conservative
13th	1917–1921	Joseph Edmond Lesage	Liberal
14th	1921–1925	Édouard-Charles St-Père	Liberal
15th	1925–1926	Édouard-Charles St-Père	Liberal
16th	1926–1930	Édouard-Charles St-Père	Liberal
17th	1930–1935	Édouard-Charles St-Père	Liberal
18th	1935–1940	Édouard-Charles St-Père	Liberal
19th	1940–1945	Raymond Eudes	Liberal
20th	1945–1949	Raymond Eudes	Liberal
21st	1949–1953	Raymond Eudes	Liberal
22nd	1953–1957	Raymond Eudes	Liberal
23rd	1957–1958	Raymond Eudes	Liberal
24th	1958–1962	Raymond Eudes	Liberal
25th	1962–1963	Raymond Eudes	Liberal
26th	1963–1965	Raymond Eudes	Liberal
27th	1965–1968	Gérard Pelletier	Liberal
28th	1968–1972	Gérard Pelletier	Liberal
29th	1972–1974	Gérard Pelletier	Liberal
30th	1974–1975	Gérard Pelletier	Liberal
30th	1975–1977	Jacques Lavoie	Progressive Conservative
30th	1977–1979	Jacques Lavoie	Liberal
Sainte-Marie
31st	1979–1980	Jean-Claude Malépart	Liberal
32nd	1980–1984	Jean-Claude Malépart	Liberal
Montreal—Sainte-Marie
33rd	1984–1988	Jean-Claude Malépart	Liberal
Riding dissolved into Laurier—Sainte-Marie and Rosemont
Hochelaga; Riding re-created from Hochelaga—Maisonneuve and Laurier—Sainte-Marie
38th	2004–2006	Réal Ménard	Bloc Québécois
39th	2006–2008	Réal Ménard	Bloc Québécois
40th	2008–2009	Réal Ménard	Bloc Québécois
40th	2009–2011	Daniel Paillé	Bloc Québécois
41st	2011–2015	Marjolaine Boutin-Sweet	New Democratic
42nd	2015–2019	Marjolaine Boutin-Sweet	New Democratic
43rd	2019–2021	Soraya Martinez Ferrada	Liberal
44th	2021–2025	Soraya Martinez Ferrada	Liberal
Hochelaga—Rosemont-Est
45th	2025–present	Marie-Gabrielle Ménard	Liberal

== Election results ==
=== Hochelaga—Rosemont-Est ===
2025 Canadian federal election
Party	Candidate	Votes	%	±%	Expenditures
Liberal	Marie-Gabrielle Ménard	23,601	46.14	+7.71	
Bloc Québécois	Rose Lessard	13,902	27.18	−4.24	
New Democratic	Julie Girard-Lemay	6,671	13.04	−7.24	
Conservative	Carl Belley	5,402	10.56	+5.85	
Green	Jacob Pirro	1,329	2.60	+0.60	
Marxist–Leninist	Christine Dandenault	242	0.47	+0.30	
Total valid votes/expense limit		51,147	98.43		
Total rejected ballots		818	1.57		
Turnout		51,965	65.78		
Eligible voters		78,997			
Liberal notional hold		Swing		+5.98	
Source: Elections Canada
Note: number of eligible voters does not include voting day registrations.

2021 federal election redistributed results
Party	Vote	%
Liberal	18,586	38.43
Bloc Québécois	15,192	31.42
New Democratic	9,808	20.28
Conservative	2,276	4.71
People's	1,100	2.27
Green	965	2.00
Rhinoceros	238	0.49
Communist	108	0.22
Marxist-Leninist	84	0.17
Total valid votes	48,357	98.21
Rejected ballots	882	1.79
Registered voters/ estimated turnout	80,228	61.37

=== Hochelaga, 2004–present ===
2021 Canadian federal election: Hochelaga
Party	Candidate	Votes	%	±%	Expenditures
Liberal	Soraya Martínez Ferrada	18,197	38.14	+4.19	$93,080.02
Bloc Québécois	Simon Marchand	15,089	31.63	-1.71	$47,805.08
New Democratic	Catheryn Roy-Goyette	9,723	20.38	-0.91	$36,496.68
Conservative	Aime Calle Cabrera	2,221	4.66	+0.17	none listed
People's	Marc-André Doucet-Beauchamp	1,081	2.27	+1.56	$0.00
Green	Zachary Lavarenne	965	2.02	-2.92	$0.00
Rhinoceros	Alan Smithee	238	0.50	-0.09	none listed
Communist	Michelle Paquette	108	0.22	+0.03	$0.00
Marxist–Leninist	Christine Dandenault	82	0.17	-0.03	$0.00
Total valid votes/expense limit		47,706	–	–	$110,275.75
Total rejected ballots		867			
Turnout			61.63	-5.17	
Registered voters		78,814			
Liberal hold		Swing		+2.96	
Source: Elections Canada

2019 Canadian federal election: Hochelaga
Party	Candidate	Votes	%	±%	Expenditures
Liberal	Soraya Martínez Ferrada	18,008	33.95	+4.03	$79,299.74
Bloc Québécois	Simon Marchand	17,680	33.34	+5.61	none listed
New Democratic	Catheryn Roy-Goyette	11,451	21.59	-9.30	$44,334.97
Green	Robert D. Morais	2,618	4.94	+1.75	none listed
Conservative	Christine Marcoux	2,381	4.49	-2.36	$4,785.89
People's	Stepan Balatsko	377	0.71	–	none listed
Rhinoceros	Chinook Blais-Leduc	314	0.59	-0.20	none listed
Marxist–Leninist	Christine Dandenault	107	0.20	-0.08	none listed
Communist	JP Fortin	107	0.19	-0.15	$865.68
Total valid votes/expense limit		53,037	98.32		
Total rejected ballots		907	1.68	+0.02	
Turnout		53,944	65.09	+1.56	
Eligible voters		82,881			
Liberal gain from New Democratic		Swing		+6.66	
Source: Elections Canada

2015 Canadian federal election: Hochelaga (electoral district)
Party	Candidate	Votes	%	±%	Expenditures
New Democratic	Marjolaine Boutin-Sweet	16,034	30.89	-16.59	$64,664.42
Liberal	Marwah Rizqy	15,534	29.93	+18.20	$19,746.32
Bloc Québécois	Simon Marchand	14,389	27.72	-3.04	$47,613.01
Conservative	Alexandre Dang	3,555	6.85	-0.35	$3,363.29
Green	Anne-Marie Saint-Cerny	1,654	3.19	+1.52	–
Rhinoceros	Nicolas Lemay	411	0.79	+0.26	$651.34
Communist	Marianne Breton Fontaine	179	0.34	-0.05	–
Marxist–Leninist	Christine Dandenault	148	0.29	-0.02	–
Total valid votes/Expense limit		51,904	98.34		$219,682.85
Total rejected ballots		877	1.66	–	
Turnout		52,781	63.52	–	
Eligible voters		83,088			
New Democratic hold		Swing		-17.40	
Source: Elections Canada

2011 federal election redistributed results
Party	Vote	%
New Democratic	22,425	47.48
Bloc Québécois	14,528	30.76
Liberal	5,542	11.73
Conservative	3,402	7.20
Green	788	1.67
Others	546	1.16

2011 Canadian federal election: Hochelaga
Party	Candidate	Votes	%	±%	Expenditures
New Democratic	Marjolaine Boutin-Sweet	22,314	48.17	+33.72	$18,453
Bloc Québécois	Daniel Paillé	14,451	31.20	−18.53	$46,974
Liberal	Gilbert Thibodeau	5,064	10.93	−9.74	$17,622
Conservative	Audrey Castonguay	3,126	6.75	−2.45	$5,647
Green	Yaneisy Delgado Dihigo	798	1.72	−2.54	none listed
Rhinoceros	Hugo Samson Veillette	246	0.53	+0.03	none listed
Communist	Marianne Breton Fontaine	180	0.39	−0.01	$1,772
Marxist–Leninist	Christine Dandenault	143	0.31	−0.08	none listed
Total valid votes		46,322	100.00		
Total rejected ballots		725			
Turnout		47,047	58.43	+0.19	
Electors on the lists		80,515			
Sources: Official Results, Elections Canada and Financial Returns, Elections Canada. Percentage change figures refer to voting shifts as compared with the 2008 general election, not the 2009 by-election.

Canadian federal by-election, November 9, 2009: Hochelaga
Party	Candidate	Votes	%	±%	Expenditures
Bloc Québécois	Daniel Paillé	8,989	51.16	+1.43	$54,233
New Democratic	Jean-Claude Rocheleau	3,444	19.60	+5.15	$69,082
Liberal	Robert David	2,519	14.34	−6.33	$23,211
Conservative	Stéphanie Cloutier	1,768	10.06	+0.86	$37,337
Green	Christine Lebel	572	3.26	−1.00	not listed
neorhino.ca	Gabrielle Anctil	129	0.73	+0.23	$130
Marxist–Leninist	Christine Dandenault	79	0.45	+0.06	$349
Independent	John Turmel	69	0.39		none listed
Total valid votes		17,569	100.00		
Total rejected ballots		264			
Turnout		17,833	22.63	−35.61	
Electors on the lists		78,801			
Sources: Official Results, Elections Canada and Financial Returns, Elections Canada.

2008 Canadian federal election: Hochelaga
Party	Candidate	Votes	%	±%	Expenditures
Bloc Québécois	Réal Ménard	22,720	49.73	−5.85	$28,893
Liberal	Diane Dicaire	9,442	20.67	+3.43	not listed
New Democratic	Jean-Claude Rocheleau	6,600	14.45	+5.54	$21,479
Conservative	Luc Labbé	4,201	9.20	−3.01	$8,586
Green	Philippe Larochelle	1,946	4.26	−0.60	not listed
neorhino.ca	Simon Landry	230	0.50	–	not listed
Communist	Marianne Breton Fontaine	184	0.40		$898
Marijuana	Blair T. Longley	183	0.40	−0.32	not listed
Marxist–Leninist	Christine Dandenault	177	0.39	−0.09	not listed
Total valid votes		45,683	100.00		
Total rejected ballots		644			
Turnout		46,327	58.24	−0.07	
Electors on the lists		79,542			
Sources: Official Results, Elections Canada and Financial Returns, Elections Canada.

2006 Canadian federal election: Hochelaga
Party	Candidate	Votes	%	±%	Expenditures
Bloc Québécois	Réal Ménard	25,570	55.58	−4.54	$25,836
Liberal	Vicky Harvey	7,932	17.24	−8.39	$10,318
Conservative	Audrey Castonguay	5,617	12.21	+8.15	$30,705
New Democratic	David-Roger Gagnon	4,101	8.91	+3.42	$2,780
Green	Rolf Bramann	2,235	4.86	+1.88	none listed
Marijuana	Blair T. Longley	332	0.72	−0.33	none listed
Marxist–Leninist	Christine Dandenault	220	0.48	+0.23	none listed
Total valid votes		46,007	100.00		
Total rejected ballots		723			
Turnout		46,730	58.31	+0.52	
Electors on the lists		80,142			
Sources: Official Results, Elections Canada and Financial Returns, Elections Canada.

2004 Canadian federal election: Hochelaga
Party	Candidate	Votes	%	±%	Expenditures
Bloc Québécois	Réal Ménard	27,476	60.12	+9.60	$35,055
Liberal	Benoit Bouvier	11,712	25.63	−10.06	$22,566
New Democratic	David Gagnon	2,510	5.49	+3.55	$695
Conservative	Mario Bernier	1,856	4.06	−3.33	$2,131
Green	Rolf Bramann	1,361	2.98		$963
Marijuana	Antoine Théorêt-Poupart	482	1.05	–	none listed
Communist	Pierre Bibeau	190	0.42		$647
Marxist–Leninist	Christine Dandenault	112	0.25		none listed
Total valid votes		45,699	100.00		
Total rejected ballots		936			
Turnout		46,635	57.79		
Electors on the lists		80,702			
Percentage change figures are factored for redistribution. Conservative Party percentages are contrasted with the combined Canadian Alliance and Progressive Conservative figures from 2000. Sources: Official Results, Elections Canada and Financial Returns, Elections Canada.

=== Montreal—Sainte-Marie, 1984–1988 ===
1984 Canadian federal election
Party	Candidate	Votes	%	±%
Liberal	Jean-Claude Malépart	13,668	43.38	-25.12
Progressive Conservative	François Richard	10,919	34.65	+21.87
New Democratic	Lauraine Vaillancourt	3,525	11.19	+2.45
Rhinoceros	Dominique Whipette Langevin	2,338	7.42	+1.49
Parti nationaliste	André Vaillancourt	990	3.14	
Commonwealth of Canada	Ghislain Coté	69	0.22	
Total valid votes		31,509	100.00	

=== Sainte-Marie, 1979–1984 ===
1980 Canadian federal election
Party	Candidate	Votes	%	±%
Liberal	Jean-Claude Malépart	19,160	68.49	+9.08
Progressive Conservative	André Payette	3,576	12.78	-7.81
New Democratic	Jean-Pierre Juneau	2,443	8.73	+3.96
Rhinoceros	François Straight Favreau	1,659	5.93	1.30
Social Credit	Gaston Pleau	605	2.16	-6.73
Independent	Lorraine Rondeau	301	1.08	
Marxist–Leninist	André Gagnon	115	0.41	-0.09
Union populaire	Claude Cousineau	114	0.41	-0.52
Total valid votes		27,973	100.00	

1979 Canadian federal election
Party	Candidate	Votes	%	±%
Liberal	Jean-Claude Malépart	19,612	59.41	+26.09
Progressive Conservative	André Payette	6,797	20.59	-27.98
Social Credit	Gaston Pleau	2,936	8.89	-1.30
New Democratic	Jean-Pierre Juneau	1,575	4.77	+0.79
Rhinoceros	François Straight Favreau	1,527	4.63	
Union populaire	Marcel Chaput	306	0.93	
Marxist–Leninist	André Gagnon	166	0.50	
Communist	Lydia Morand	91	0.28	
Total valid votes		33,010	100.00	

=== Hochelaga, 1867–1979 ===
Canadian federal by-election, 14 October 1975: Hochelaga
Party	Candidate	Votes	%	±%
Pelletier resigned, 29 August 1975
Progressive Conservative	Jacques Lavoie	8,236	48.58	+18.19
Liberal	Pierre Juneau	5,649	33.32	-16.54
Social Credit	Gilles Caouette	1,729	10.20	-0.46
New Democratic	Onias Synnott	675	3.98	-2.92
Independent	Gérard Contant	396	2.34	
Independent	Louise Ouimet	169	1.00	
Independent	Daniel Charlebois	101	0.60	
Total valid votes		16,955	100.00	

1974 Canadian federal election: Hochelaga
Party	Candidate	Votes	%	±%
Liberal	Gérard Pelletier	10,561	49.86	+5.52
Progressive Conservative	Jacques Lavoie	6,435	30.38	+5.91
Social Credit	Lucien Mallette	2,258	10.66	
New Democratic	Roger Hébert	1,461	6.90	-10.92
Independent	Jean Poitras	190	0.90	
Marxist–Leninist	Robert Lévesque	181	0.85	
Communist	Guy Désautels	95	0.45	
Total valid votes		21,181	100.00	
lop.parl.ca

1972 Canadian federal election: Hochelaga
Party	Candidate	Votes	%	±%
Liberal	Gérard Pelletier	11,235	44.34	-10.80
Progressive Conservative	Jacques Lavoie	6,199	24.47	-1.64
New Democratic	Raymond-Gérard Laliberté	4,515	17.82	+5.07
Independent	Gérard Contant	2,171	8.57	
Independent	Jacques Ferron	879	3.47	
Independent	Françoise Lévesque	338	1.33	
Total valid votes		25,337	100.00	

1968 Canadian federal election: Hochelaga
Party	Candidate	Votes	%	±%
Liberal	Gérard Pelletier	12,080	55.14	+7.39
Progressive Conservative	Michel Gagnon	5,720	26.11	+6.49
New Democratic	René Nantel	2,793	12.75	-6.88
Ralliement créditiste	Dollard Desormeaux	1,122	5.12	-8.83
Communist	Jeannette Walsh	192	0.88	
Total valid votes		21,907	100.00	

1965 Canadian federal election: Hochelaga
Party	Candidate	Votes	%	±%
Liberal	Gérard Pelletier	11,929	47.76	+1.39
New Democratic	Claude Richer	4,902	19.62	+7.61
Progressive Conservative	Marius Heppell	4,662	18.66	+4.88
Ralliement créditiste	Fernand Bourret	3,486	13.96	-12.73
Total valid votes		24,979	100.00	

Note: Ralliement créditiste vote is compared to Social Credit vote in the 1963 election.

1963 Canadian federal election: Hochelaga
Party	Candidate	Votes	%	±%
Liberal	Raymond Eudes	13,093	46.36	-4.09
Social Credit	Fernand Bourret	7,535	26.68	+17.60
Progressive Conservative	J.-Marius Heppell	3,892	13.78	-15.92
New Democratic	Arthur Lamoureux	3,394	12.02	+2.57
Communist	Jeannette Pratte	327	1.16	-0.17
Total valid votes		28,241	100.00	

1962 Canadian federal election: Hochelaga
Party	Candidate	Votes	%	±%
Liberal	Raymond Eudes	13,220	50.45	-2.21
Progressive Conservative	Yvon Groulx	7,784	29.70	-10.78
New Democratic	Noël Langlois	2,475	9.44	+5.37
Social Credit	Robert Leblanc	2,379	9.08	
Communist	Samuel Walsh	347	1.32	-1.46
Total valid votes		26,205	100.00	

1958 Canadian federal election: Hochelaga
Party	Candidate	Votes	%	±%
Liberal	Raymond Eudes	16,706	52.65	-23.28
Progressive Conservative	Benoît Gonthier	12,845	40.48	+25.52
Co-operative Commonwealth	Armand Sauvé	1,294	4.08	+1.15
Labor–Progressive	Camille Dionne	883	2.78	-3.39
Total valid votes		31,728	100.00	

1957 Canadian federal election: Hochelaga
Party	Candidate	Votes	%	±%
Liberal	Raymond Eudes	20,611	75.93	-0.36
Progressive Conservative	Benoît Gonthier	4,063	14.97	-0.40
Labor–Progressive	Gérard Fortin	1,675	6.17	+2.70
Co-operative Commonwealth	Lucien Pépin	796	2.93	-1.95
Total valid votes		27,145	100.00	

1953 Canadian federal election: Hochelaga
Party	Candidate	Votes	%	±%
Liberal	Raymond Eudes	19,467	76.29	+8.93
Progressive Conservative	Jean Jodoin	3,921	15.37	-11.11
Co-operative Commonwealth	Roger Beaudin	1,245	4.88	
Labor–Progressive	Camille Dionne	885	3.47	
Total valid votes		25,518	100.00	

1949 Canadian federal election: Hochelaga
Party	Candidate	Votes	%	±%
Liberal	Raymond Eudes	17,633	67.36	+5.11
Progressive Conservative	Joseph-Omer Ravary	6,930	26.47	+20.35
Union des électeurs	Roméo Dagenais	1,615	6.17	+4.69
Total valid votes		26,178	100.00	

1945 Canadian federal election: Hochelaga
Party	Candidate	Votes	%	±%
Liberal	Raymond Eudes	22,444	62.25	+8.42
Bloc populaire	Raymond Godin	7,915	21.95	
Independent	Jean-Paul Chauvin	2,264	6.28	-23.02
Progressive Conservative	Achille Dubeau	2,208	6.12	-6.81
Co-operative Commonwealth	Noël-Émile Bourassa	692	1.92	
Social Credit	Léopold Gendron	533	1.48	
Total valid votes		36,056	100.00	

Note: Progressive Conservative vote is compared to "National Government" vote in 1940 election.

1940 Canadian federal election: Hochelaga
Party	Candidate	Votes	%	±%
Liberal	Raymond Eudes	16,849	53.83	-10.77
Independent Liberal	Jean-Paul Chauvin	9,172	29.30	
National Government	Achille Dubeau	4,049	12.94	+1.26
Independent Liberal	Richard Thibault	1,230	3.93	
Total valid votes		31,300	100.00	

Note: "National Government" vote is compared to Conservative vote in 1935 election.

1935 Canadian federal election: Hochelaga
Party	Candidate	Votes	%	±%
Liberal	Édouard-Charles St-Père	19,506	64.60	-3.81
Reconstruction	Hervé Langevin	7,164	23.73	
Conservative	Armand Chevrette	3,524	11.67	-19.92
Total valid votes		30,194	100.00	

1930 Canadian federal election: Hochelaga
Party	Candidate	Votes	%	±%
Liberal	Édouard-Charles St-Père	19,382	68.41	-15.94
Conservative	Joseph-Thomas-Ulric Simard	8,949	31.59	+18.53
Total valid votes		28,331	100.00	
Source: lop.parl.ca

1926 Canadian federal election: Hochelaga
Party	Candidate	Votes	%	±%
Liberal	Édouard-Charles St-Père	16,339	84.35	+8.65
Conservative	Joseph-Thomas-Ulric Simard	2,530	13.06	-11.24
Independent Liberal	Jean-Marie-Mastaï-Georges Cardinal	502	2.59	
Total valid votes		19,371	100.00	

1925 Canadian federal election: Hochelaga
Party	Candidate	Votes	%	±%
Liberal	Édouard-Charles St-Père	14,741	75.70	-13.92
Conservative	Jean-Baptiste Bumbray alias Jean Edouard Charles	4,732	24.30	+13.92
Total valid votes		19,473	100.00	

1921 Canadian federal election: Hochelaga
Party	Candidate	Votes	%	±%
Liberal	Édouard-Charles St-Père	20,164	89.62	-4.59
Conservative	Joseph Rosario Léo Ayotte	2,335	10.38	
Total valid votes		22,499	100.00	

Note: Liberal vote is compared to Opposition vote in 1917 election.

1917 Canadian federal election: Hochelaga
Party	Candidate	Votes	%	±%
Opposition (Laurier Liberals)	Joseph Edmond Lesage	9,697	94.21	
Labour	Gédéon Martel	309	3.00	
Unknown	Cléophas Dignard	287	2.79	
Total valid votes		10,293	100.00	

By-election on 15 October 1915 Coderre appointed Puisne Judge, Superior Court of Quebec, 6 October 1915
Party	Candidate	Votes
Conservative	Esioff Léon Patenaude	acclaimed

Canadian federal by-election, 19 November 1912
Party	Candidate	Votes	%	±%
Coderre appointed Secretary of State for Canada, 29 October 1912
Conservative	Louis Coderre	4,276	68.10	+12.81
Nationalist	Léopold Doyon	2,003	31.90	
Total valid votes		6,279	100.00	

1911 Canadian federal election: Hochelaga
Party	Candidate	Votes	%	±%
Conservative	Louis Coderre	7,178	55.29	+6.30
Unknown	Louis-Alfred-Adhémar Rivet	5,805	44.71	-6.30
Total valid votes		12,983	100.00	

1908 Canadian federal election: Hochelaga
Party	Candidate	Votes	%	±%
Liberal	Louis-Alfred-Adhémar Rivet	4,656	51.01	-2.16
Conservative	Louis Coderre	4,471	48.99	+2.16
Total valid votes		9,127	100.00	

1904 Canadian federal election: Hochelaga
Party	Candidate	Votes	%	±%
Liberal	Louis-Alfred-Adhémar Rivet	4,974	53.17	+1.29
Conservative	A.A. Bernard	4,381	46.83	-1.29
Total valid votes		9,355	100.00	

Canadian federal by-election, 16 February 1904: Hochelaga
Party	Candidate	Votes	%	±%
Madore appointed Puisne Judge of the Supreme Court of Quebec, December 1903
Liberal	Louis-Alfred-Adhémar Rivet	4,114	51.88	-2.50
Conservative	A.A. Bernard	3,816	48.12	+2.50
Total valid votes		7,930	100.00	

1900 Canadian federal election: Hochelaga
Party	Candidate	Votes	%	±%
Liberal	Joseph Alexandre Camille Madore	4,127	54.38	+0.64
Conservative	Sévérin Lachapelle	3,462	45.62	-0.64
Total valid votes		7,589	100.00	

1896 Canadian federal election: Hochelaga
Party	Candidate	Votes	%	±%
Liberal	Joseph Alexandre Camille Madore	3,635	53.74	+11.79
Conservative	Séverin Lachapelle	3,129	46.26	-11.79
Total valid votes		6,764	100.00	

Note: change in popular vote indicates change from 1891 general election.

By-election on 21 October 1892 Desjardins called to the Senate, 1 October 1892
Party	Candidate	Votes
Conservative	Séverin Lachapelle	acclaimed

1891 Canadian federal election: Hochelaga
Party	Candidate	Votes	%	±%
Conservative	Alphonse Desjardins	5,266	58.05	+6.20
Liberal	Joseph Lanctot	3,805	41.95	-6.20
Total valid votes		9,071	100.00	

1887 Canadian federal election: Hochelaga
Party	Candidate	Votes	%
Independent Conservative	Alphonse Desjardins	3,050	51.85
Liberal	Joseph Lanctot	2,832	48.15
Total valid votes		5,882	100.00

1882 Canadian federal election: Hochelaga
Party	Candidate	Votes
Conservative	Alphonse Desjardins	acclaimed

1878 Canadian federal election: Hochelaga
Party	Candidate	Votes	%
Conservative	Alphonse Desjardins	3,039	56.48
Unknown	Laurent-Olivier David	2,342	43.52
Total valid votes		5,381	100.00

1874 Canadian federal election: Hochelaga
Party	Candidate	Votes
Conservative	Alphonse Desjardins	acclaimed
Source: lop.parl.ca

1872 Canadian federal election: Hochelaga-Maisonneuve
Party	Candidate	Votes	%	±%
Conservative	Louis Beaubien	1,800	58.40	
Unknown	V. Hudon	1,282	41.60	
Total valid votes		3,082	100.00	
Source: Canadian Elections Database

1867 Canadian federal election: Hochelaga
Party	Candidate	Votes	%
Liberal	Antoine-Aimé Dorion	1,312	50.44
Unknown	J. Lanouette	1,289	49.56
Total valid votes		2,601	100.00
Eligible voters		3,448	
Source: Canadian Parliamentary Guide, 1871

== See also ==
- List of Canadian electoral districts
- Historical federal electoral districts of Canada
