= Athanase David =

Canadian politician (1882–1953)

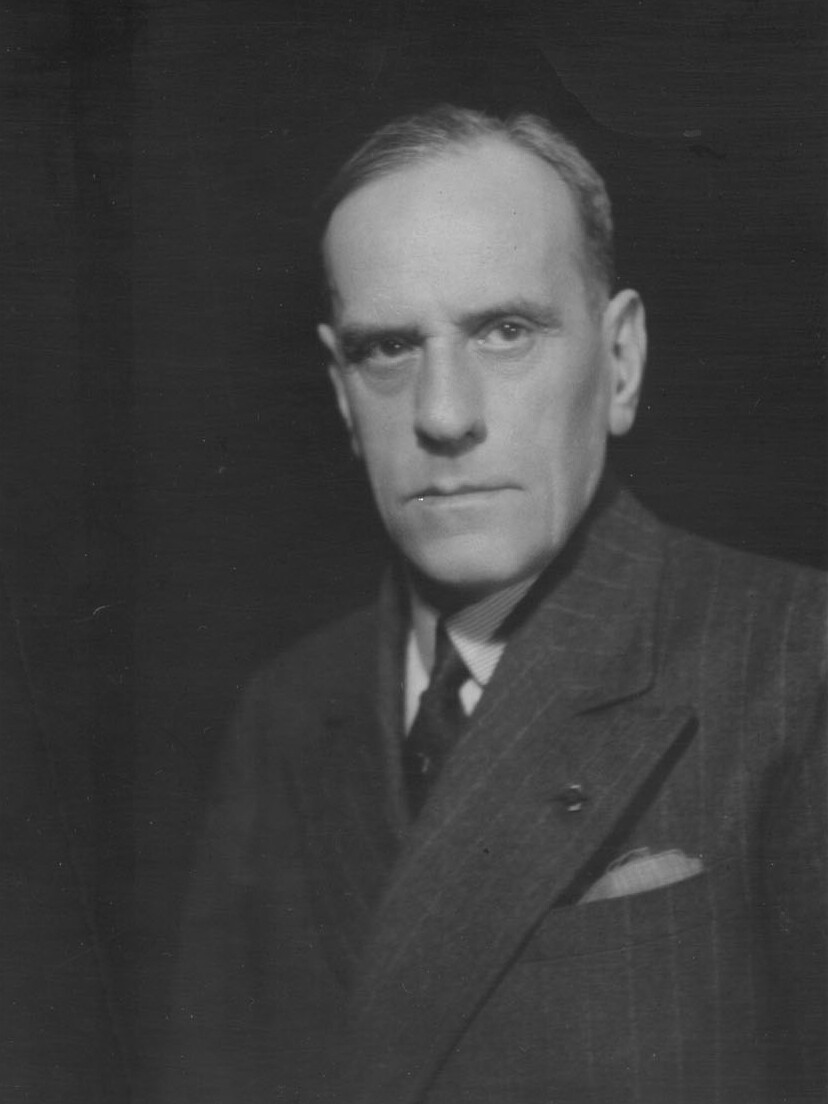

Senator for Saurel, Quebec
- In office 1940–1953
- Appointed by: William Lyon Mackenzie King
- Preceded by: Joseph-Marcellin Wilson
- Succeeded by: Mariana Beauchamp Jodoin

Secretary of the Province of Quebec
- In office 1919–1936
- Prime Minister: Lomer Gouin; Louis-Alexandre Taschereau
- Preceded by: Jérémie-Louis Décarie
- Succeeded by: Charles-Auguste Bertrand

Member of the Legislative Assembly of Quebec for Terrebonne
- In office 1916–1936
- Preceded by: Jean Prévost
- Succeeded by: Hermann Barrette
- In office 1939–1940
- Preceded by: Hermann Barrette
- Succeeded by: Hector Perrier

Personal details
- Born: Louis-Athanase David; June 24, 1882 Montreal, Quebec
- Died: January 26, 1953 (aged 70)
- Party: Liberal
- Spouse: Antonia Nantel
- Children: Paul David
- Profession: lawyer

Louis-Athanase David (June 24, 1882 – January 26, 1953) was a Canadian lawyer, politician, and businessman. He was a cabinet minister in the Provincial Parliament of Quebec, representing the riding of Terrebonne and serving as Provincial Secretary. In this position, he created Quebec's first cultural policy. He was later a member of the Canadian Senate.

== Early life ==
David was born in Montreal; He was the son of Laurent-Olivier David, a Canadian journalist, lawyer, and politician. He received a law degree from Université Laval in Montreal and was admitted to the Bar of Quebec in 1905.

== Career ==
David began practising law in 1905, and was a partner in the law firm of Elliott & David. He joined the Liberal party, and was elected to the Legislative Assembly of Quebec in 1916 as the Liberal Party member for the Terrebonne riding, serving until 1936. As Quebec's Provincial Secretary, David developed the city's cultural institutions, such as a national museum, literary prize, scholarships, and educational programs.

David directed the Department of Education, and in 1930 he sponsored a controversial bill which would have created a separate Jewish school board in Quebec.

David did not run in the 1936 election, but was elected again in 1939.

David created the Prix Athanase-David literary prize in 1922. In 1923 was made a Knight of the Legion of Honour by the government of France; he was made an Officer in 1925 and a Commander in 1934.

A sports fan, David was president of the Montreal Canadiens ice hockey club from 1930 to 1935. The club won three Stanley Cups during his tenure in 1924, 1930, and 1931. In 1928 he partnered with Montreal stockbroker Ernest Savard and American baseball executive George Stallings to revive the Montreal Royals baseball franchise as part of the International League and to build Delorimier Stadium.

David resigned from the provincial government in February 1940 to accept an appointment as Senator in the Parliament of Canada where he served until his death in 1953.

=== 1935 ballot controversy ===
In the 1935 election, David's victory was contested on the ground that the ballot papers were not printed in the form prescribed under the Election Act. At the subsequent hearing, the judge ruled that all cast ballots were declared void. Immediately afterwards, the returning officer announced that, as this resulted in a 0-0 tie, he cast his deciding vote in favour of David.

Votes cast in Terrebonne (1935)
Candidate		Initial count	As determined by Returning Officer
Liberal	Athanase David	4,893	1
Conservative	Hermann Barrette	4,170	–
Majority		720	1

The returning officer's action was considered to have been without precedent anywhere in the world in countries with parliamentary-style legislatures. The Conservatives lodged an appeal, but the result was upheld by the Quebec Court of Appeal in April 1936. David would become the only member of the Assembly in Quebec history to be elected on only one cast vote.

== Personal ==
David was married to Antonia Nantel (known as Madame Athanase David), who was an arts administrator and patron in Montreal. He helped her in establishing the Montreal Symphony Orchestra in 1934 and the Montreal Festivals in 1936. Their son, Paul David, was a cardiologist and later Canadian senator. His granddaughter is Françoise David.

== See also ==
- List of crossings of the Rivière des Mille Îles
