= Jacques Lavoie =

Canadian politician

Member of Parliament for Hochelaga
- In office October 1975 – March 1979

Personal details
- Born: 4 November 1936 Montreal, Quebec, Canada
- Died: 20 January 2000 (aged 63) Montreal, Quebec, Canada
- Party: Liberal; Progressive Conservative
- Profession: public servant, radiology technician

Jacques Lavoie (4 November 1936 – 20 January 2000) was a Progressive Conservative then Liberal member of the House of Commons of Canada. Born in Montreal, Quebec, he was a public servant and radiology technician before entering politics.

He was first elected at the Hochelaga riding in a 14 October 1975 by-election following the resignation of incumbent Gérard Pelletier. He switched to the Liberal party in June 1977, but ran as an independent candidate in the 1979 election as he was unsuccessful in becoming the party's nominee.

== Timeline ==
=== Election campaigns ===
- 1963 federal election: Defeated at Quebec West
- 1965 federal election: Defeated at Quebec West
- 1972 federal election: Defeated at Hochelaga
- 1974 federal election: Defeated at Hochelaga
- 14 October 1975 by-election: Elected at Hochelaga
- 1979 federal election: Defeated at Hochelaga—Maisonneuve

=== Caucus service ===
- 14 October 1975 – 13 June 1977: Progressive Conservative Party, before end of 30th Parliament
- 14 June 1977 – 26 March 1979: Liberal Party of Canada, to end of 30th Parliament

== Electoral record ==
Canadian federal by-election, 14 October 1975: Hochelaga
Party	Candidate	Votes	%	±%
Pelletier resigned, 29 August 1975
Progressive Conservative	Jacques Lavoie	8,236	48.58	+18.19
Liberal	Pierre Juneau	5,649	33.32	-16.54
Social Credit	Gilles Caouette	1,729	10.20	-0.46
New Democratic	Onias Synnott	675	3.98	-2.92
Independent	Gérard Contant	396	2.34	
Independent	Louise Ouimet	169	1.00	
Independent	Daniel Charlebois	101	0.60	
Total valid votes		16,955	100.00	
