= Louis-Alfred-Adhémar Rivet =

Canadian politician

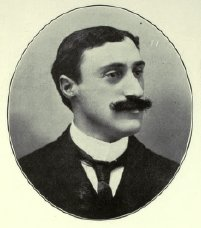

Member of the Canadian Parliament for Hochelaga
- In office 1904–1911
- Preceded by: Joseph Alexandre Camille Madore
- Succeeded by: Louis Coderre

Personal details
- Born: September 15, 1873 Joliette, Quebec, Canada
- Died: January 14, 1951 (aged 77)
- Party: Liberal

Louis-Alfred-Adhémar Rivet (September 15, 1873 – January 14, 1951) was a Canadian lawyer and politician.

Born in Joliette, Quebec, he was educated at Laval University where he received a B.A and LL.B. He was a practicing lawyer in the law firm of Rivet, Robillard & Tetrault. He was elected to the House of Commons of Canada for Hochelaga in a 1904 by-election, after the sitting MP, Joseph Alexandre Camille Madore, appointed Puisne Judge of the Supreme Court of Quebec. A Liberal, he was re-elected in 1904 and 1908. He was defeated in 1911.

== Electoral record ==
1911 Canadian federal election: Hochelaga
Party	Candidate	Votes	%	±%
Conservative	Louis Coderre	7,178	55.29	+6.30
Unknown	Louis-Alfred-Adhémar Rivet	5,805	44.71	-6.30
Total valid votes		12,983	100.00	

1908 Canadian federal election: Hochelaga
Party	Candidate	Votes	%	±%
Liberal	Louis-Alfred-Adhémar Rivet	4,656	51.01	-2.16
Conservative	Louis Coderre	4,471	48.99	+2.16
Total valid votes		9,127	100.00	

1904 Canadian federal election: Hochelaga
Party	Candidate	Votes	%	±%
Liberal	Louis-Alfred-Adhémar Rivet	4,974	53.17	+1.29
Conservative	A.A. Bernard	4,381	46.83	-1.29
Total valid votes		9,355	100.00	

Canadian federal by-election, 16 February 1904: Hochelaga
Party	Candidate	Votes	%	±%
Madore appointed Puisne Judge of the Supreme Court of Quebec, December 1903
Liberal	Louis-Alfred-Adhémar Rivet	4,114	51.88	-2.50
Conservative	A.A. Bernard	3,816	48.12	+2.50
Total valid votes		7,930	100.00	
