= Séverin Lachapelle =

Canadian politician (1850–1913)

Séverin Lachapelle (September 18, 1850 – June 18, 1913) was a physician, educator and political figure in Quebec. He represented Hochelaga in the House of Commons of Canada from 1892 to 1896 as a Conservative member.

He was born Pierre-Alphonse-Séverin in Saint-Rémi, Canada East, the son of Léon Lachapelle and Rébecca Lanctôt, and was educated at the Petit Séminaire de Montréal. Lachapelle served as a papal zouave from 1868 to 1870. He then studied at the Montreal School of Medicine and Surgery and set up practice in Saint-Constant, later moving to Saint-Henri. Lachapelle married Elise Demers in 1874. He was mayor for Saint-Henri from 1886 to 1887.

He contributed to the monthly L’Union médicale du Canada, also serving on its editorial board, and wrote a science column for the Revue canadienne; he also was the first editor for the Journal d’hygiène populaire and the magazine La Mère et l’enfant. He became one of the first professors at the Montreal campus of the Université Laval and served on the medical board for the Notre-Dame Hospital. In 1888, he published Manuel d’hygiène à l’usage des écoles et des familles ..., an instructive guide on hygiene which was also translated into English in 1891. In 1889, he was named superintendent for the Crèche de la Miséricorde, a child care facility. He contributed to Le médecin de la famille, encyclopédie de médecine et d’hygiène publique et privée contenant la description de toutes les maladies connues ..., published in 1893. In 1907, he helped found the Hôpital Sainte-Justine. He helped establish the Gouttes de Lait program at Montreal with the aim of reducing infant mortality.

Lachapelle was first elected to the House of Commons in an 1892 by-election held after Alphonse Desjardins was named to the Canadian senate. He was defeated by Joseph Alexandre Camille Madore when he ran for reelection in 1896 and 1900. He died in Montreal at the age of 62 and was buried in Notre Dame des Neiges Cemetery.

In 1880, Lachapelle said "There is one particularly unsettling belief that is particularly widespread and deeply rooted in our families because it is shared by medical practitioners, and that is that there is no point in treating children's diseases." He was part of a movement which addressed that misperception.

== Electoral record ==
1900 Canadian federal election: Hochelaga
Party	Candidate	Votes	%	±%
Liberal	Joseph Alexandre Camille Madore	4,127	54.38	+0.64
Conservative	Sévérin Lachapelle	3,462	45.62	-0.64
Total valid votes		7,589	100.00	

1896 Canadian federal election: Hochelaga
Party	Candidate	Votes	%	±%
Liberal	Joseph Alexandre Camille Madore	3,635	53.74	+11.79
Conservative	Séverin Lachapelle	3,129	46.26	-11.79
Total valid votes		6,764	100.00	

Note: change in popular vote indicates change from 1891 general election.

By-election on 21 October 1892 Desjardins called to the Senate, 1 October 1892
Party	Candidate	Votes
Conservative	Séverin Lachapelle	acclaimed
