= Joseph Alexandre Camille Madore =

Canadian politician

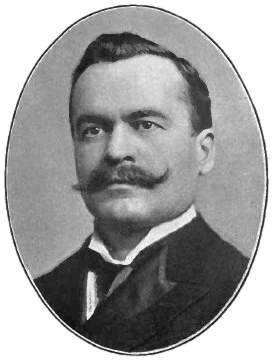

Member of the Canadian Parliament for Hochelaga
- In office 1896–1903
- Preceded by: Séverin Lachapelle
- Succeeded by: Louis-Alfred-Adhémar Rivet

Personal details
- Born: August 3, 1858 Blue Bonnet's, Canada East
- Died: November 3, 1906 (aged 48)
- Party: Liberal

Joseph Alexandre Camille Madore (August 3, 1858 – November 3, 1906) was a Canadian politician.

Born in Blue Bonnet's, Canada East, Madore was educated at the Montreal College, St. Mary's College and at McGill University, where he graduated a B.C.L. in 1880. In 1881 he was called to the Quebec Bar. He was elected to the House of Commons of Canada for Hochelaga in the 1896 federal election. A Liberal, he was re-elected in 1900. In 1903, he was appointed Puisne Judge of the Supreme Court of Quebec.

== Electoral record ==
1900 Canadian federal election: Hochelaga
Party	Candidate	Votes	%	±%
Liberal	Joseph Alexandre Camille Madore	4,127	54.38	+0.64
Conservative	Sévérin Lachapelle	3,462	45.62	-0.64
Total valid votes		7,589	100.00	

1896 Canadian federal election: Hochelaga
Party	Candidate	Votes	%	±%
Liberal	Joseph Alexandre Camille Madore	3,635	53.74	+11.79
Conservative	Séverin Lachapelle	3,129	46.26	-11.79
Total valid votes		6,764	100.00	

Note: change in popular vote indicates change from 1891 general election.
