= Pierre Juneau =

Canadian film and broadcast executive

Pierre Juneau PC OC MSRC

Minister of Communications
- In office August 29, 1975 – October 24, 1975
- Prime Minister: Pierre Trudeau
- Preceded by: Gérard Pelletier
- Succeeded by: Otto Lang

Chairman of the CRTC
- In office 1968–1975
- Succeeded by: Harry J. Boyle

Personal details
- Born: October 17, 1922 Verdun, Quebec, Canada
- Died: February 21, 2012 (aged 89) Montreal, Quebec, Canada
- Party: Liberal
- Education: Université de Montréal; University of Paris
- Occupation: broadcast executive

Pierre Juneau PC OC MSRC (October 17, 1922 – February 21, 2012) was a Canadian film and broadcast executive, a one-time member of the Canadian Cabinet, the first chairman of the Canadian Radio-television and Telecommunications Commission (CRTC) and subsequently president of the Canadian Broadcasting Corporation. He is credited with the creation, promotion, and championing of Canadian content requirements for radio and television. Juneau is the namesake of the Juno Awards.

== Early life ==
He was born in Verdun, now part of Montreal, to a working-class family. After graduating from the Université de Montréal, he studied at the University of Paris where he met Pierre Trudeau, with whom he co-founded the dissident political magazine Cité Libre upon returning to Montreal.

He was the Jeunesse Étudiante Chrétienne (JEC) Canadian representative at the International Young Catholic Students (IYCS) Centre for International Documentation and Information (CIDI) in 1947–49. He is considered as one of the key men behind the creation of IYCS which today is present in over 80 countries with millions of members.

== National Film Board of Canada ==
Juneau joined the National Film Board of Canada in 1949. Hired as the NFB's French Advisor by commissioner Albert Trueman to see how the NFB could better meet the needs of francophone filmmakers and contemporary Quebec society, Juneau was one of the original proponents for the creation of a French-language production branch at the NFB.

In the 1950s, he was the NFB's assistant regional supervisor in Quebec, and then became the chief of international distribution, the assistant head of the European office, and the NFB's secretary. In 1964, he became the board's Director of French-language production.

== Film festival founder ==
In 1959, Juneau was a co-founder of the Montreal International Film Festival, and served as its president until 1968.

== CRTC ==
In 1966, Juneau was appointed vice-chairman of the Bureau of Broadcast Governors and the last Chairman in March 1968. When the BBG became the Canadian Radio and Television Commission (CRTC) in 1968, Juneau became the body's first chairman. In the early 1970s, he was the architect of the CRTC's Canadian content regulations that require a certain percentage of radio and television time to be devoted to programming (or music in the case of radio) produced in Canada. Canadian content, by requiring radio stations to give air play to Canadian artists, is credited with creating a domestic market for Canadian music and the subsequent boom in music production. The music industry's Juno Awards are named after Juneau, and in 1971 he received a special Juno award for "Canadian music industry Man of the Year".

== Political career ==
In 1975, Juneau left the CRTC to accept an appointment by Prime Minister Pierre Trudeau to the cabinet as Minister of Communications. Since Juneau did not have a seat in the House of Commons of Canada, he attempted to enter parliament through a by-election, but was defeated in the Montreal riding of Hochelaga by the Progressive Conservative candidate, Jacques Lavoie. Following constitutional convention which requires that a cabinet minister have or obtain a seat in parliament shortly after his appointment, he resigned from cabinet.

== Civil service ==
He was subsequently appointed to the civil service by Trudeau as undersecretary of state, and then, in 1980, as deputy minister of communications.

== Canadian Broadcasting Corporation ==
In 1982, he became president of the Canadian Broadcasting Corporation. As Juneau was closely identified with the Liberal Party, he was viewed with hostility by the Progressive Conservative government of Brian Mulroney that came to power in the 1984 election. He clashed with the Mulroney government over budget cuts and its reorganization of the CBC but nevertheless completed his seven-year term.

Despite financial pressures, during his term as CBC president, Juneau inaugurated a new cable service, CBC Newsworld, and increased Canadian content on the CBC to 95% of programming. Under Juneau, CBC Television increased its level of Canadian content and moved towards commissioning independently produced drama helping to stimulate the production industry where previously it had produced most drama in-house.

== Later life ==
After retiring from the CBC, he founded the World Radio and Television Council, a non-government organization supported by UNESCO. He also taught in the communications department of the Université de Montréal.

== Electoral record ==
Canadian federal by-election, 14 October 1975: Hochelaga
Party	Candidate	Votes	%	±%
Pelletier resigned, 29 August 1975
Progressive Conservative	Jacques Lavoie	8,236	48.58	+18.19
Liberal	Pierre Juneau	5,649	33.32	-16.54
Social Credit	Gilles Caouette	1,729	10.20	-0.46
New Democratic	Onias Synnott	675	3.98	-2.92
Independent	Gérard Contant	396	2.34	
Independent	Louise Ouimet	169	1.00	
Independent	Daniel Charlebois	101	0.60	
Total valid votes		16,955	100.00	

== Honours ==
In 1975, he was made an officer of the Order of Canada and was elected a member of the Royal Society of Canada. He received honorary doctorates from York University, Ryerson Polytechnic University, Trent University and Université de Moncton.

== Death ==
Juneau died in Montreal from heart failure on February 21, 2012. He was 89. He was entombed at the Notre Dame des Neiges Cemetery in Montreal.

Government offices
Preceded by None	Chairman of the CRTC; 1968–1975	Succeeded by Harry J. Boyle
Preceded by Albert Wesley Johnson	President of the Canadian Broadcasting Corporation; 1982–1989	Succeeded by William T. Armstrong
