= Paul David (cardiologist) =

Canadian politician

The Honourable Paul David

Senator for Bedford, Quebec
- In office April 16, 1985 – December 25, 1994
- Appointed by: Brian Mulroney
- Preceded by: Louis-Philippe Beaubien
- Succeeded by: Céline Hervieux-Payette

Personal details
- Born: December 25, 1919 Montreal, Quebec
- Died: April 5, 1999 (aged 79)
- Resting place: Notre Dame des Neiges Cemetery
- Party: Progressive Conservative
- Relations: Laurent-Olivier David (grandfather)
- Children: Pierre David; Françoise David; Thérèse David; Anne-Marie David; Hélène David; Charles-Philippe David
- Parent(s): Louis-Athanase David; Antonia Nantel
- Education: University of Paris; Université de Montréal
- Committees: Chairman, Standing Committee on Social Affairs, Science and Technology

Paul David CC GOQ (December 25, 1919 – April 5, 1999) was a Canadian cardiologist, founder of the Montreal Heart Institute, and Senator.

Born in Montreal, Quebec, the son of Louis-Athanase David and Antonia Nantel, he received his Bachelor's degree from the University of Paris in 1939 and his MD from the Université de Montréal in 1944. He specialized in cardiology in Boston at the Massachusetts General Hospital in 1946 and in Paris at the Hôpital Lareboisière in 1947. Upon his return to Montreal, he worked at the Notre-Dame Hospital. He founded the Montreal Heart Institute in 1954. It was under his direction that the first heart transplant ever performed in Canada was carried out at the Institute, in 1968.

In 1985, he was appointed to the Senate of Canada on the recommendation of Prime Minister Brian Mulroney. He sat as a Progressive Conservative senator representing the Senatorial division of Bedford, Quebec. He retired on his 75th birthday in 1994. His father, Louis-Athanase David and grandfather, Laurent-Olivier David were Liberal Senators. He is the younger brother of Simone David-Raymond founder of the Marie-Enfant Hospital.

In 1968, he was made an Officer of the Order of Canada and was promoted to Companion in 1981. In 1988, he was named a Grand Officer of the National Order of Quebec. In 2011, he was inducted into the Canadian Medical Hall of Fame.

He married Nellie Maillard, daughter of Charles Maillard director of École des beaux-arts de Montréal and had six children: filmmaker Pierre, Québec solidaire MNA Françoise, Thérèse, Anne-Marie, Liberal MNA Hélène and Charles-Philippe. A few years after Nellie Maillard's death (1969), he was remarried to Dr. Yvette Lemire. After his death in 1999, he was entombed at the Notre Dame des Neiges Cemetery in Montreal.
