= Montreal Festivals =

Arts festival held in Montreal, Quebec, Canada

The Montreal Festivals (French: Festivals de Montréal) was an arts festival held annually in Montreal, Quebec, Canada from 1936-1965. The festival was originally dedicated to the performance of classical music, presenting concerts of symphonic works, operas, oratorios, chamber music, and recitals. It was initially operated by the Montreal Symphony Orchestra (MSO), but became its own independent institution with its own orchestra in 1939. In 1952 the festival began expanding its offerings, and by 1965 the festival encompassed presentations of popular music, jazz, folk music, dance, arts and craft exhibitions, and a film festival. Notable artists who performed at the festival included conductors Emil Cooper, Laszlo Halasz, Erich Leinsdorf, Charles Munch, Charles O'Connell, and Eugene Ormandy; pianists Gyorgy Cziffra, José Iturbi, and Wilhelm Kempff; and singers Rose Bampton, Marjorie Lawrence, Grace Moore, Martial Singher, and Eleanor Steber.

== Early history with the MSO ==
The Festival de Musique de Montreal Festivals, later known as Montreal Festivals, was founded in 1936 by Madame Athanase David, her husband, the Honourable Louis-Athanase David, and conductor Wilfrid Pelletier as the Festival de musique de Montreal. The festival was formed with the purpose of establishing in Canada a festival similar to annual music festivals of Europe such as the Aix-en-Provence Festival. Pelletier also wanted a summer concert venue for the MSO, which had been established just two years earlier.

The MSO opened the first festival on 15 June 1936 with a performance of Johann Sebastian Bach's St Matthew Passion and Ludwig van Beethoven's Symphony No. 9 in the chapel of St-Laurent College. Pelletier conducted the performance which also included the talents of the Cathedral Singers and the Disciples de Massenet. The MSO opened the 1937 festival with Bach's Mass in B Minor and Giuseppe Verdi's Requiem, and performed Beethoven's Missa solemnis for the opening of the 1938 Festival.

== Madame Athanase David leads the festival ==
In 1939 the festival formed its own orchestra separate from the MSO, was incorporated as its own entity, and was renamed the Montreal Festivals (MF). Madame Athanase David was appointed the organizations first president, a position she held until 1952. David notably expanded the festival to include a winter series of concerts in addition to the summer program. The winter series featured chamber music performances, mostly by the McGill String Quartet, and programs of French art songs by renowned singers.

While continuing to present symphonic works and oratorios, the MF expanded into the field of opera; presenting open-air productions annually at usually the Percival Molson Memorial Stadium or at the Chalet atop Mount Royal. Among the operas mounted by the company were Verdi's Aida; La Bohème, Madama Butterfly, and Tosca by Giacomo Puccini;, Georges Bizet's Carmen; Jules Massenet's Manon, and Johann Strauss II's Die Fledermaus among others. In June 1940 the festival notably presented the Canadian premiere of Claude Debussy's opera Pelléas et Mélisande with Raoul Jobin as Pelléas, Marcelle Denya as Mélisande, and Pelletier conducting at His Majesty's Theatre, Montreal. The festival also notably presented the Canadian premieres of Richard Strauss's Ariadne auf Naxos (1946, in a production toured by the New York City Opera company) and Igor Stravinsky's Histoire du soldat (1949) during David's tenure.

Sir Thomas Beecham became the festival's chief conductor between 1941 and 1945, leading performances of Johannes Brahms's Ein deutsches Requiem, Edward Elgar's The Dream of Gerontius, Gabriel Fauré's Requiem, Charles Gounod's Roméo et Juliette, and Richard Wagner's Tristan und Isolde among other major works. He also conducted a series of popular concerts at the festival.

== Gouin and Letendre lead the festival ==
After David stepped down, Paul Gouin was appointed president of the MF in 1952. He in turn was succeeded by Robert Letendre in 1956 who remained the MF's president until it disbanded in 1965. Under Gouin's tenure, the MF expanded into offering performances of theatrical productions like plays, musicals, operettas, ballets, and modern dance productions. Concerts of jazz music and folk music were also added. Letendre continued to expand the festival further, adding concerts of popular music, arts and crafts exhibitions, and a film festival. Both Gouin and Letendre were interested in expanding the festival's presentation of works created by Canadians. In 1963 the festival's new home, the Place des Arts performing arts centre, was opened. The concert venue was built by the Government of Montreal in large part due to the advocacy of both Gouin and Letendre, who convinced Mayor Jean Drapeau of Montreal's need for a better performance venue.

As the festival expanded, the organizational structure of the MF required the creation of a staff music director. This post was held by Françoys Bernier (1956–1960), Roland Leduc (1960–1963), and Gérard Lamarche (1964–1965). While the musical offerings of the festival diversified, it still maintained a commitment to its classical music roots. The festival notably presented the Canadian premieres of Arthur Honegger's Jeanne d'Arc au bûcher (1953); Jean Racine's classic tragedy Athalie with music by baroque composer Jean-Baptiste Moreau and new music by Clermont Pépin (1956); Ildebrando Pizzetti's Assassinio nella cattedrale (1959); Maurice Ravel's L'heure espagnole (1961); Claudio Monteverdi's Vespro della Beata Vergine 1610 (1962); and Gilbert Bécaud's L'Opéra d'Aran (1965).

Despite significant support for the MF from the government and the general public, the MF had accumulated a large deficit by the mid-1960s. With the preparations for Expo 67 requiring much of the city's financial budget, a decision was made to discontinue the Montreal Festivals after the 1965 festival. The MF's last performance was of Joseph Haydn's The Seasons on 31 August 1965 under the baton of Pelletier.
