= Provincial Secretary of Quebec =

The Provincial Secretary of Quebec was a senior position in the provincial cabinet of Quebec from before Canadian Confederation until 1970.

The Provincial Secretary and Registrar was originally the second highest position in the provincial cabinet, equivalent to the position of Deputy Premier. The Provincial Secretary was the equivalent of the former Canadian Cabinet position of Secretary of State for Canada.

== Pre-Confederation Provincial Secretary ==
Prior to Confederation and the creation of the office of Premier, the Provincial Secretary was the most important and powerful figure in provincial politics. The title holder was appointed by the Lieutenant Governor and many sat as members of the Legislative Council.

=== Lower Canada ===
- John Ready (1818-1822)
- Sir Dominick Daly (1827-1840)

=== Canada East ===
- Sir Dominick Daly (1843-1844)

=== United Provinces of Canada ===
- Sir Dominick Daly (1844-1848)
- Pierre Joseph Olivier Chauveau (1853-1854) Conservative
- Sir George-Étienne Cartier (1855-1857) Conservative

== Provincial Secretary and Registrar of Quebec ==
- Pierre-Joseph-Olivier Chauveau (1867-1873) Conservative
- Gedeon Ouimet (1873-1874) Conservative
- Charles-Eugène Boucher de Boucherville (1874-1876) Conservative
- Joseph-Adolphe Chapleau (1876-1878) Conservative
- Félix-Gabriel Marchand 1878-1879 Conservative
- Alexandre Chauveau (1879) Liberal
- Étienne-Théodore Pâquet 1879-1882 Conservative
- Jean Blanchet (1882-1887) Conservative
- Charles-Antoine-Ernest Gagnon (1887-1890) Liberal
- Joseph-Émery Robidoux (1890) Liberal
- Charles Langelier (1890–1891) Liberal

== Provincial Secretary of Quebec ==
- Louis-Philippe Pelletier (1891-1896) Conservative
- Michael Felix Hackett (1896-1897) Conservative
- Felix-Gabriel Marchand (1897) Liberal
- Joseph-Émery Robidoux (1897-1901) Liberal
- Adélard Turgeon (1901-1902) Liberal
- Amédée Robitaille (1902-1905) Liberal
- Louis-Rodolphe Roy (1905-1909) Liberal
- Louis-Jérémie Décarie (1909–1919) Liberal
- Athanase David (1919–1936) Liberal
- Charles-Auguste Bertrand (1936)
- Albiny Paquette (1936-1939) Union Nationale
- Henri Groulx (1939-1940) Liberal
- Hector Perrier (1940-1944)
- Omer Côté (1944-1956) Union Nationale
- Romeo Lorrain (1956) Union Nationale
- Yves Prevost (1956–1960) Union Nationale
- Lionel Bertrand (1960-1963) Liberal
- Bona Arsenault (1963–1966) Liberal
- Yves Gabias (1966-1968) Union Nationale
- Rémi Paul (1968–1970) Union Nationale

== See also ==
- Provincial Secretary and Registrar of Ontario
