= Asbestos strike =

1949 labour dispute among miners in Asbestos, Quebec, Canada

The Asbestos strike of 1949, based in and around the town of Asbestos, Quebec, Canada, was a four-month labour dispute by asbestos miners. It has traditionally been portrayed as a turning point in Quebec history that helped lead to the Quiet Revolution. It also helped launch the careers of Jean Marchand, Gérard Pelletier, and Pierre Trudeau.

== Events ==
At midnight on February 14, 1949, miners walked off the job at four asbestos mines in the Eastern Townships, near Asbestos, Quebec and Thetford Mines. Though these mines were owned by either American or English-Canadian companies, almost all the workers were francophones. The largest company was the American Johns-Manville firm. The union had several demands. These included the elimination of asbestos dust inside and outside of the mill; a fifteen cent an hour general wage increase; a five-cent an hour increase for night work; a social security fund to be administered by the union; the implementation of the Rand Formula; and "double time" payment for work on Sundays and holidays. These demands were radical in Quebec at the time, and the owners rejected them.

On February 13, 1949, the workers voted to strike. The National Federation of Mining Industry Employees and the Canadian Catholic Federation of Labour represented the workers. Jean Marchand was the general secretary of the latter and is often seen as the de facto leader of the strike.

The strike was illegal. Quebec Premier Maurice Duplessis sided strongly with the companies, largely due to his hostility to all forms of socialism. The provincial government sent squads of police to protect the mines. Duplessis' Union Nationale party had long been closely allied with the Catholic Church, but parts of the church would move to support the workers. The population and media of Quebec were sympathetic to the strikers. The lead reporter for Le Devoir was Gérard Pelletier, who was deeply sympathetic to the cause of the workers. Pierre Elliott Trudeau also covered the strike in a sympathetic manner.

Six weeks into the strike, Johns-Manville hired strikebreakers to keep the mines open. The community was deeply divided as some of the workers crossed the picket lines. The strike turned violent as the 5000 strikers attacked, destroying the property of the "scabs" and intimidating them through force. More police were sent to protect the strikebreakers. The striking miners and police fought on the picket line and hundreds of miners were arrested. Some of the incidents included: On March 14, a dynamite explosion destroyed part of a railroad track that led into the Johns-Manville Corporation Canadian subsidiary property. On March 16, strikers overturned a company jeep, injuring a passenger.

Strikers had the support of Canadian unions and some of the Catholic Church in Quebec. The Catholic Church, which had until that time been largely supportive of the Union Nationale government of Duplessis, profoundly affected the strike. Some priests backed the companies, but most sided with the strikers. On March 5, Archbishop Joseph Charbonneau delivered a fiercely pro-union speech asking all Catholics to donate to help the strikers. Premier Duplessis asked the church to transfer the archbishop to Vancouver because of his encouragement of the strike. The church refused, signaling a dramatic change in Quebec society. Charbonneau did resign and became the chaplain at a hospital in Victoria, British Columbia.

On May 5, the strikers launched an effort to shut down the mine in Asbestos by barricading the mine and every road into and out of town. Police attempts to force their way through the barricades failed. The strikers backed down when the police pledged to open fire on the strikers. The next day, the riot act was read and mass arrests of the strikers had begun, including a raid on the church. The arrested strikers were beaten and their leaders severely battered.

After the arrests, the unions decided that they must compromise, and began negotiations with the company. Archbishop Maurice Roy, of Quebec City, served as mediator. In June, the workers agreed to return to work with few gains. When the dispute ended, miners received a small pay increase, but many never regained their jobs.

== Significance ==
One of the most violent and bitter labour disputes in Quebec and Canadian history, the strike led to great upheaval in Quebec society. The strike was in large part led by Jean Marchand, a labour unionist. Journalist Gérard Pelletier and future Canadian prime minister Pierre Elliott Trudeau, then a journalist, also played significant roles. Marchand, Pelletier and Trudeau would eventually become prominent Canadian politicians and were known later in their political careers as Les Trois Colombes (the Three Wise Men). They would largely establish the direction of Quebec federalism for a generation.

Trudeau edited a book, The Asbestos Strike, that presented the strike as the origin of modern Quebec, portraying it as "a violent announcement that a new era had begun." Some historians argue that the strikers were simply pursuing better conditions and that the resulting change in society was an unintended byproduct.

Popular opinion for most of the strike was broadly supportive of the striking workers. This support, beyond its moral value, manifested itself through monetary support and the supply of provisions. It is likely that the strike would have quickly failed had it not been for the establishment of this kind of support.

In 2004, a French-language book about the strike by author-historian Esther Delisle and Pierre K. Malouf was published under the title Le Quatuor d'Asbestos.

== See also ==
- List of incidents of civil unrest in Canada
