= Louis Coderre =

Canadian politician (1865–1935)

The Honourable Louis Coderre PC
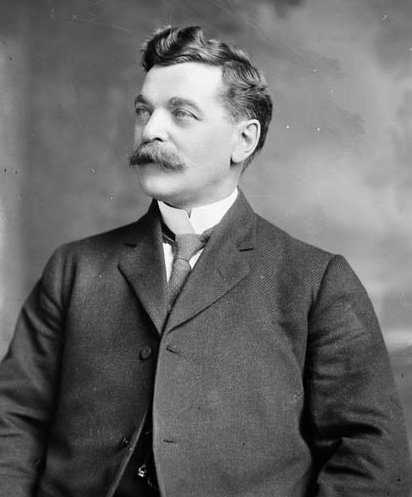
- Coderre in 1912

Member of the Canadian Parliament for Hochelaga
- In office 1911–1915
- Preceded by: Louis-Alfred-Adhémar Rivet
- Succeeded by: Esioff-Léon Patenaude

Secretary of State for Canada
- In office October 29, 1912 – October 5, 1915
- Preceded by: William James Roche
- Succeeded by: Pierre Édouard Blondin

Minister of Mines
- In office February 10, 1913 – October 5, 1915
- Preceded by: William James Roche
- Succeeded by: Pierre Édouard Blondin

Personal details
- Born: November 1, 1865 Saint-Ours, Canada East
- Died: March 29, 1935 (aged 69)
- Party: Conservative

Louis Coderre PC (November 1, 1865 – March 29, 1935) was a Canadian politician.

Born in Saint-Ours, Canada East, Coderre's spent his early career practising as a lawyer. A Conservative, he unsuccessfully ran in the 1908 federal election in the Quebec riding of Hochelaga. He ran again in Hochelaga in the 1911 federal election, defeating MP Louis-Alfred-Adhémar Rivet.

From 1912 to 1915, Coderre was the secretary of state for Canada. He also served as the minister of mines from 1913 to 1915.

== Electoral record ==
Canadian federal by-election, 19 November 1912
Party	Candidate	Votes	%	±%
Coderre appointed Secretary of State for Canada, 29 October 1912
Conservative	Louis Coderre	4,276	68.10	+12.81
Nationalist	Léopold Doyon	2,003	31.90	
Total valid votes		6,279	100.00	

1911 Canadian federal election: Hochelaga
Party	Candidate	Votes	%	±%
Conservative	Louis Coderre	7,178	55.29	+6.30
Unknown	Louis-Alfred-Adhémar Rivet	5,805	44.71	-6.30
Total valid votes		12,983	100.00	

1908 Canadian federal election: Hochelaga
Party	Candidate	Votes	%	±%
Liberal	Louis-Alfred-Adhémar Rivet	4,656	51.01	-2.16
Conservative	Louis Coderre	4,471	48.99	+2.16
Total valid votes		9,127	100.00	
