= Françoise David =

Canadian politician

Françoise David CQ
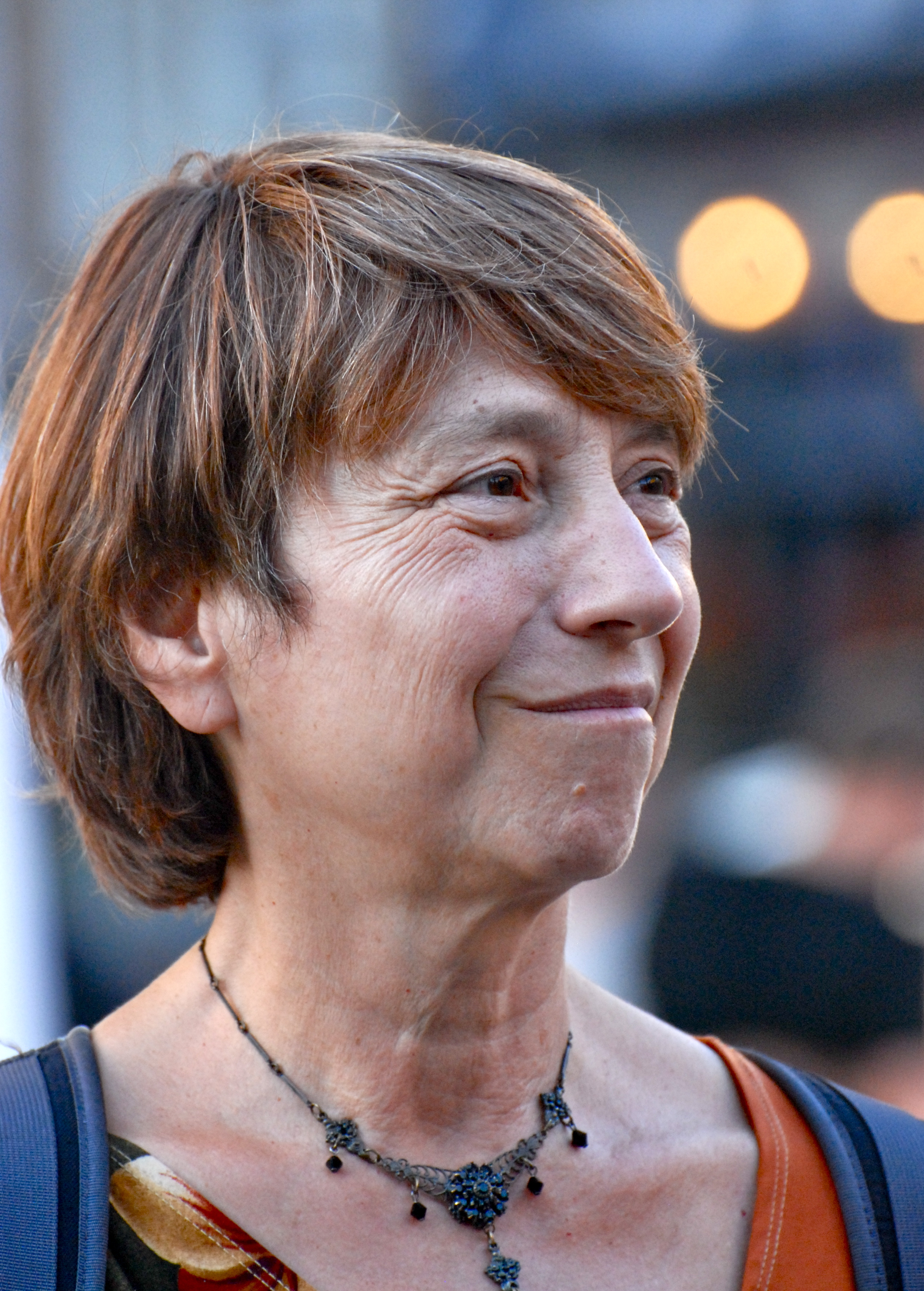

Member of the National Assembly for Gouin
- In office September 4, 2012 – January 19, 2017
- Preceded by: Nicolas Girard
- Succeeded by: Gabriel Nadeau-Dubois

Personal details
- Born: January 13, 1948 (age 78) Montreal, Quebec, Canada
- Party: Québec solidaire
- Spouse: François Larose
- Parent(s): Paul David; Nellie Maillard
- Relatives: Pierre David (brother); Thérèse David (sister); Anne-Marie David (sister); Hélène David (sister); Charles-Philippe David (brother)
- Education: Université de Montréal
- Profession: Community organizer

Françoise David CQ (French pronunciation: [fʁɑ̃swaz david]; born January 13, 1948) is a former spokesperson of Québec solidaire – a left-wing, feminist, and sovereigntist political party in the province of Quebec, Canada. She was elected to serve as the Member of the National Assembly of Quebec for the riding of Gouin in the 2012 Quebec election, and then again in the 2014 Quebec election. Quebec Solidaire was born from the merger of Option Citoyenne with l'Union des Forces Progressistes. She is the author of the book/manifesto Bien commun recherché – une option citoyenne (over 7,000 copies sold in Quebec) which attempts to combine the concepts of "common good", social justice, ecology and economic democracy into a coherent political doctrine. On January 19, 2017, Françoise David announced her immediate retirement as both party spokesperson and as a Member of the National Assembly due to her health.

== Biography ==
In 1987, Françoise David became coordinator for the Regroupement des centres de femmes du Québec. Seven years later, she was named president of the Fédération des femmes du Québec (FFQ). In this capacity, she ensured that women's issues, including poverty and violence against women, remained at the forefront in Canada. She was president of the FFQ from 1994 to 2001.

She is the daughter of cardiologist and Progressive Conservative Senator Paul David. Her grandfather Athanase David was a Liberal Senator. She is also the sister of political science professor and director of Raoul-Dandurand Chair, Charles-Philippe David.

Two of her best-recognised public successes have been the 1995 Women's March against Poverty and the 2000 World March of Women against Poverty and Violence.

In addition to her work experience, Françoise David is a member of numerous community organizations. In January 2000, she participated in the non-governmental observation mission to Iraq, and in December 2001 she traveled to Mali with the Canadian University Service Overseas.

In 1999, she was made a Knight of the National Order of Quebec. In 2002, she was awarded the Governor General's Award in Commemoration of the Persons Case.

David ran in the riding of Gouin in central Montreal in the 2007 Quebec election, finishing second to the PQ incumbent Nicolas Girard. David received 7913 votes, amounting to 26% of the vote in her riding, behind Girard's 11,318 votes (37%). Quebec Solidaire received 3.7% of the vote provincewide.

David ran in Gouin a second time in the 2008 Quebec election, receiving 7987 votes, or approximately 32% of the total, but again losing out to Girard, who received 10,276 votes (41%). Quebec Solidaire received 3.8% of the vote provincewide and David's co-leader Amir Khadir won the party's first seat in the National Assembly of Quebec in the neighbouring riding of Mercier.

In the 2012 Quebec election, David was elected for the first time. She was re-elected in 2014, her party winning the most seats in its history.

Her younger sister, Hélène David, was elected as a Liberal MNA for the provincial riding of Outremont in the 2014 Quebec election. David holds a PhD in psychology and since 1984 she was an instructor and vice-rector at the university. From 2008 to 2010 she was Assistant Deputy Minister for higher education in the Quebec Ministry of Education, Recreation & Sport under Premier Jean Charest. When asked if her sister Françoise tried to persuade her to join Québec solidaire, Hélène said that the two have "known for a long time that we're not necessarily from the same political family." Unlike Françoise, Hélène is a federalist.

Françoise David is married to François Larose, with whom she had one child.

== Electoral record ==
2014 Quebec general election: Gouin
Party	Candidate	Votes	%	±%
Québec solidaire	Françoise David	16,155	50.98	+4.95
Parti Québécois	Louise Mailloux	6,438	20.31	-12.17
Liberal	Cheraquie Auguste-Constant	5,642	17.80	+6.13
Coalition Avenir Québec	Paul Franche	2,748	8.67	+0.60
Option nationale	Olivier Lacelle	358	1.13	–
Parti nul	Marc Boulanger	351	1.11	–
Total valid votes		31,692	98.80	–
Total rejected ballots		385	1.20	–
Turnout		32,077	73.18	-4.73
Electors on the lists		43,831	–	–
Québec solidaire hold		Swing		+8.56
Source: .

2012 Quebec general election: Gouin
Party	Candidate	Votes	%	±%
Québec solidaire	Françoise David	15,483	46.03	+14.18
Parti Québécois	Nicolas Girard	10,927	32.48	-8.70
Liberal	Anson Duran	3,924	11.67	-8.26
Coalition Avenir Québec	Bernard Labadie	2,713	8.07	+4.48*
Green	Sameer Muldeen	448	1.33	-1.89
Unité Nationale	Gilles Guibord	143	0.43	–
Total valid votes		33,638	99.00	–
Total rejected ballots		339	1.00	–
Turnout		33,977	77.91	+19.88
Electors on the lists		43,608	–	–
Québec solidaire gain from Parti Québécois		Swing		+11.44
Source: Official Results, Le Directeur général des élections du Québec.

* Result compared to Action démocratique

2008 Quebec general election: Gouin
Party	Candidate	Votes	%	±%
Parti Québécois	Nicolas Girard	10,276	41.18	+3.93
Québec solidaire	Françoise David	7,947	31.85	+5.82
Liberal	Edith Keays	4,972	19.93	+1.46
Action démocratique	Caroline Giroux	895	3.59	-8.06
Green	Stephan Merchant	753	3.02	-2.74
Parti indépendantiste	Jonathan Godin	110	0.44	–
Total valid votes		24,953	98.73	–
Total rejected ballots		321	1.27	–
Turnout		25,274	58.03	-12.06
Electors on the lists		43,554	–	–

2007 Quebec general election: Gouin
Party	Candidate	Votes	%	±%
Parti Québécois	Nicolas Girard	11,318	37.25	-20.53
Québec solidaire	Françoise David	7,910	26.03	+18.06*
Liberal	Nathalie Rivard	5,612	18.47	-5.85
Action démocratique	Jean-Philip Ruel	3,540	11.65	+6.65
Green	Yohan Tremblay	1,750	5.76	+2.04
Bloc Pot	Hugô St-Onge	147	0.48	-0.51
Independent	Jocelyne Leduc	109	0.36	–
Total valid votes		30,386	99.08	–
Total rejected ballots		281	0.92	–
Turnout		30,667	70.09	+35.63
Electors on the lists		43,752	–	–

* Result compared to UFP
