= Antonia David =

Canadian arts administrator and arts patron

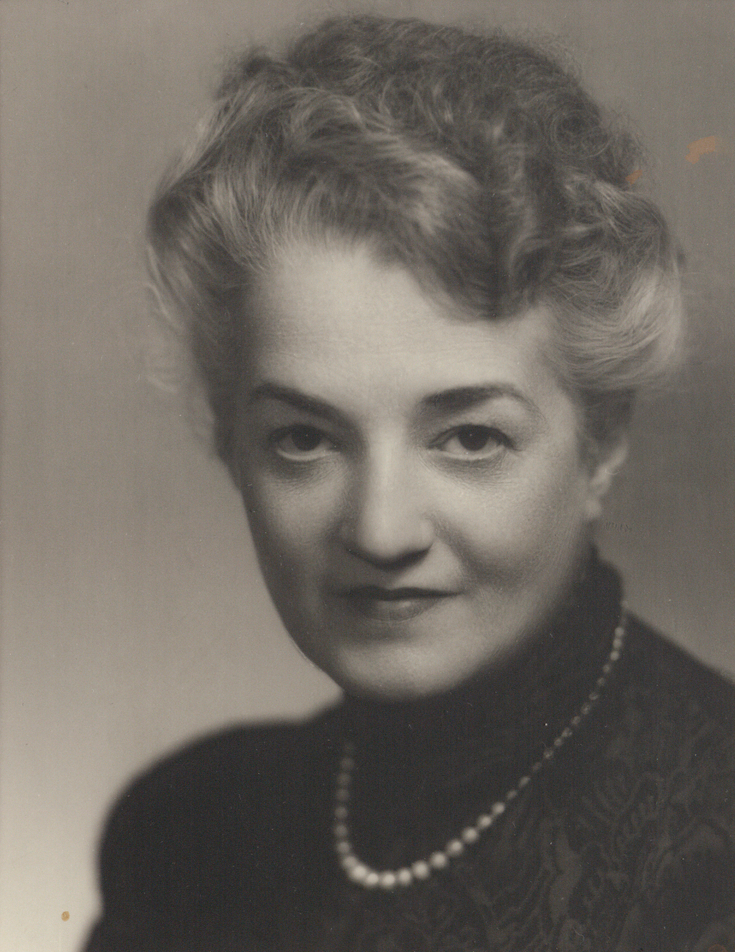
Antonia David, née Nantel, circa 1943

Antonia David (14 April 1886 – 6 December 1955) was a Canadian arts administrator and arts patron.

== Early life and education ==
David was born Antonia Nantel in Saint-Jérôme, Quebec, the daughter of Guillaume-Alphonse Nantel, who was a journalist and a Conservative Member of Parliament. she studied the piano in Montreal before entering the Conservatoire de Paris where she studied opera and was a piano student of Antoine-Émile Marmontel.

== Career ==
Nantel had intended to pursue a singing career, but abandoned these plans after her marriage to Louis-Athanase David, the Provincial Secretary of Quebec, in 1908. Her husband later became a member of the Senate of Canada and their son, Paul David, was a cardiologist and also a member of the Canadian Senate.

David became heavily involved in supporting the arts within the city of Montreal. She played an instrumental role in establishing the Montreal Orchestra in 1930 and served on that ensemble's executive committee. She left that committee in 1934, finding the orchestra's hiring practices to be discriminatory against French-speakers. She went on to play an important part in establishing the Montreal Symphony Orchestra in 1934 with the help of her husband. In 1936 she and Wilfrid Pelletier established the Montreal Festivals, of which she later served as president from 1939 to 1952.
