= Alphonse Desjardins (politician) =

Canadian politician

The Honourable Alphonse Desjardins PC
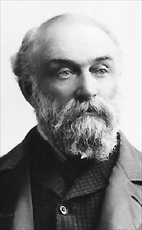

22nd Mayor of Montreal
- In office 1893–1894
- Preceded by: James McShane
- Succeeded by: Joseph-Octave Villeneuve

Member of the Canadian Parliament for Hochelaga
- In office 1874–1892
- Preceded by: Louis Beaubien
- Succeeded by: Séverin Lachapelle

Senator for De Lorimier, Quebec
- In office 1892–1896
- Appointed by: John Abbott
- Preceded by: Alexandre Lacoste
- Succeeded by: François Béchard

Minister of Militia and Defence
- In office 15 January 1896 – 27 April 1896
- Prime Minister: Mackenzie Bowell
- Preceded by: Mackenzie Bowell
- Succeeded by: David Tisdale

Personal details
- Born: 6 May 1841 Terrebonne, Province of Canada
- Died: 4 June 1912 (aged 71) Terrebonne, Quebec, Canada
- Profession: businessman, journalist, lawyer

Alphonse Desjardins, PC (French pronunciation: [alfɔ̃s deʒaʁdɛ̃]; 6 May 1841 – 4 June 1912) was a Canadian lawyer, journalist, businessman, and politician. Born in Terrebonne, Canada East, he was mayor of Montreal from 1893 to 1894 and later a Canadian Cabinet minister. He married Virginie Paré in 1864 and remarried Hortense Barsalou in 1880.

He owned a tile factory and participated in the founding of the Banque Jacques-Cartier, which later became part of the National Bank of Canada. He represented the riding of Hochelaga in the House of Commons for 18 years, serving as a cabinet minister and Minister of Militia and Defence for a few months at the end of the Mackenzie Bowell government and then the short-lived Charles Tupper government in 1896. He was named a senator in 1892. He became mayor of Montreal from 1893 to 1894. For a time he held three posts (member of the House of Commons, senator, mayor) simultaneously.

In 1872, he was created a Knight of the Order of Pius IX in acknowledgment of his services to the Catholic Church.

== Electoral record ==
1891 Canadian federal election: Hochelaga
Party	Candidate	Votes	%	±%
Conservative	Alphonse Desjardins	5,266	58.05	+6.20
Liberal	Joseph Lanctot	3,805	41.95	-6.20
Total valid votes		9,071	100.00	

1887 Canadian federal election: Hochelaga
Party	Candidate	Votes	%
Independent Conservative	Alphonse Desjardins	3,050	51.85
Liberal	Joseph Lanctot	2,832	48.15
Total valid votes		5,882	100.00

1882 Canadian federal election: Hochelaga
Party	Candidate	Votes
Conservative	Alphonse Desjardins	acclaimed

1878 Canadian federal election: Hochelaga
Party	Candidate	Votes	%
Conservative	Alphonse Desjardins	3,039	56.48
Unknown	Laurent-Olivier David	2,342	43.52
Total valid votes		5,381	100.00

1874 Canadian federal election: Hochelaga
Party	Candidate	Votes
Conservative	Alphonse Desjardins	acclaimed
Source: lop.parl.ca

== Gallery ==
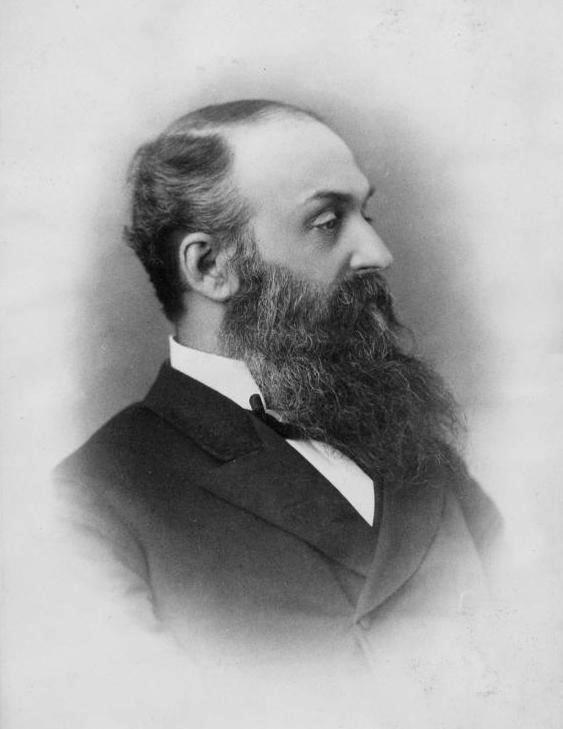
