= Joseph Edmond Lesage =

Canadian politician

Joseph-Edmond Lesage (November 16, 1871 – June 25, 1941) was a physician and political figure in Quebec. He represented Hochelaga in the House of Commons of Canada from 1917 to 1921 as a Laurier Liberal.

He was born in Saint-Raymond, Quebec, the son of Dr. Charles Lesage and Euphrémie Vézina, and was educated at the Séminaire de Québec and the Université Laval. In 1902, he married Delphine Brillon. From 1895 to 1909, Lesage practised medicine in Cleveland, Ohio; in 1909, he moved his practice to Montreal, Quebec. He died in Montreal at the age of 69.

1917 Canadian federal election: Hochelaga
Party	Candidate	Votes	%	±%
Opposition (Laurier Liberals)	Joseph Edmond Lesage	9,697	94.21	
Labour	Gédéon Martel	309	3.00	
Unknown	Cléophas Dignard	287	2.79	
Total valid votes		10,293	100.00	
