= 2026 Laurier—Sainte-Marie federal by-election =

Pending Canadian federal by-election

- December 7, 2026

Riding of Laurier—Sainte-Marie
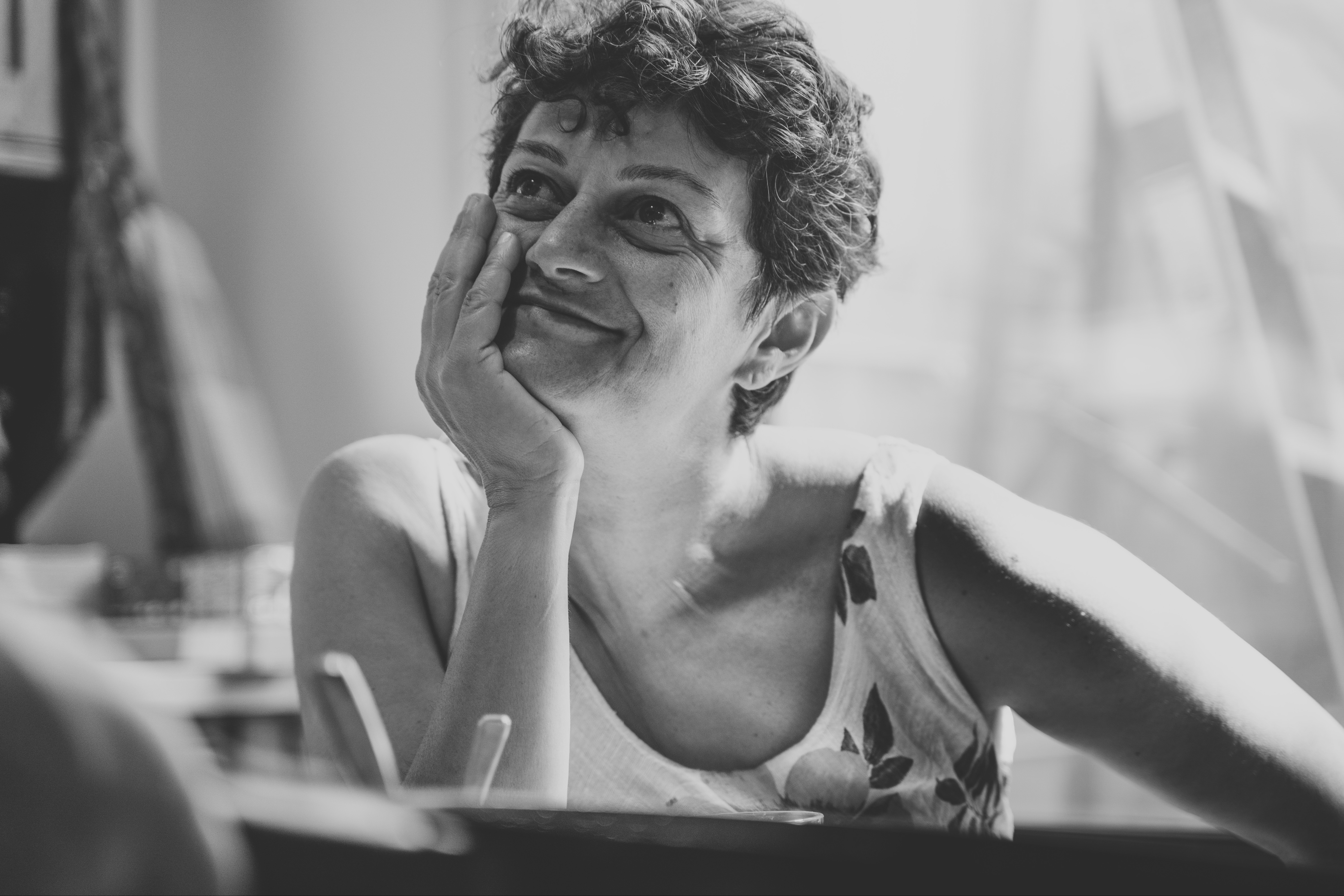
	LPC
Candidate	Guy Cormier	Nimâ Machouf
Party	Liberal	New Democratic
Last election	52.07%	18.81%
	BQ	CPC
Candidate	Zumretay Arkin	Mathieu Fournier
Party	Bloc Québécois	Conservative
Last election	15.42%	9.15%
Incumbent MP
Vacant (Note: The seat was held by Steven Guilbeault (Liberal) until his resignation on August 28, 2026.)

A federal by-election will be held on December 7, 2026, in the Quebec federal electoral district of Laurier—Sainte-Marie following the resignation of Liberal member of Parliament (MP) Steven Guilbeault on August 28, 2026. Elections Canada received official notice of the vacancy on August 31. The date of the by-election was required to be announced by February 27, 2027, and the latest possible date for the by-election to be held was April 19, 2027. On November 1, 2026, the election was called to be held on December 7.

== Background ==
Guilbeault, an environmental activist before entering federal politics, was first elected to the House of Commons in the 2019 Canadian federal election. He served as Minister of Canadian Heritage from 2019 to 2021 and as Minister of Environment and Climate Change from 2021 to 2025. He was re-elected in 2021 and 2025.

In the 2025 federal election, Guilbeault was re-elected with 27,286 votes, or 52.1 per cent of the vote. New Democratic Party (NDP) candidate Nimâ Machouf finished second with 9,856 votes, or 18.8 per cent, followed by Bloc Québécois candidate Emmanuel Lapierre with 8,079 votes, or 15.4 per cent.

On May 27, 2026, Guilbeault announced that he would resign from Parliament later that summer, saying that he wanted to continue his work on environmental protection and climate change outside elected politics. Guilbeault had resigned from the federal cabinet in November 2025 over the government's agreement with Alberta concerning a proposed oil pipeline and changes to federal climate policy.

Guilbeault's office subsequently confirmed that he would leave Parliament on August 28. On August 31, Chief Electoral Officer Stéphane Perrault received official notice from the speaker of the House of Commons that the seat was vacant. Under the timetable announced by Elections Canada, the by-election must be called between September 11, 2026, and February 27, 2027. Once called, it must be held on a Monday at least 36 days and no more than 50 days later. The earliest possible date for the by-election was therefore October 19, 2026.

Guilbeault's departure created the second pending federal by-election on the island of Montreal, alongside Rosemont—La Petite-Patrie, where former NDP MP Alexandre Boulerice also left federal politics to seek election provincially.

Laurier—Sainte-Marie was represented from 1990 to 2011 by Gilles Duceppe, who subsequently became leader of the Bloc Québécois. He was defeated in 2011 by the NDP's Hélène Laverdière, who represented the riding until she chose not to seek re-election in 2019. Following Guilbeault's announcement, Bloc Québécois leader Yves-François Blanchet said that his party expected to be "highly competitive" in the riding.

== Candidates ==
=== Liberal ===
On October 31, 2026, Guy Cormier was announced as the Liberal candidate. He is the former CEO of the Desjardins Group.

=== New Democratic Party ===
On July 16, 2026, the NDP nominated epidemiologist Nimâ Machouf as its candidate. Machouf had previously been the party's candidate in Laurier—Sainte-Marie in the 2019, 2021 and 2025 federal elections, finishing second on each occasion.

=== Bloc Québécois ===
On October 25, 2026, Yves François-Blanchet announced Zumretay Arkin, the former vice president of the World Uyghur Congress, as the Bloc Québéecois candidate.

=== Conservative ===
On November 4, the Conservatives announced Mathieu Fournier as the candidate.

=== People's Party ===
The PPC nominated Eugène Duplessis, who was their candidate for this seat in 2025.

== Result ==
Canadian federal by-election, December 7, 2026: Laurier—Sainte-Marie Resignation of Steven Guilbeault
The by-election will be held on December 7, 2026.
Party	Candidate	Votes	%	±%
Liberal	Guy Cormier			
New Democratic	Nimâ Machouf			
Bloc Québécois	Zumretay Arkin			
Conservative	Mathieu Fournier			
Green	TBD			
People's	Eugène Duplessis			
Total valid votes				
Total rejected ballots				
Turnout				
Eligible voters				
Source: Elections Canada

== Previous result ==
2025 Canadian federal election: Laurier—Sainte-Marie
Party	Candidate	Votes	%	±%	Expenditures
Liberal	Steven Guilbeault	27,286	52.07	+12.57	$96,925.97
New Democratic	Nimâ Machouf	9,856	18.81	−11.62	$81,258.28
Bloc Québécois	Emmanuel Lapierre	8,079	15.42	−4.72	$37,025.22
Conservative	Mathieu Fournier	4,796	9.15	+4.66	$24.40
Green	Dylan Perceval-Maxwell	1,452	2.77	+0.54	$7,445.70
Marxist–Leninist	Michel Labelle	269	0.51	+0.35	$0.00
People's	Eugène Duplessis	253	0.48	−1.28	$971.89
Rhinoceros	Chantal Poulin	195	0.37	N/A	$0.00
Communist	Adrien Welsh	115	0.22	+0.03	$0.00
Independent	Simon-Pierre Lauzon	62	0.12	N/A	$245.00
Independent	Dimitri Mourkes	38	0.07	N/A	none listed
Total valid votes		52,401	98.86	+0.10	$128,761.60
Total rejected ballots		602	1.14	-0.10	
Turnout		53,003	64.02	+7.74	
Eligible voters		82,797			
Liberal notional hold		Swing		+12.09	
Source: Elections Canada

== See also ==
- By-elections to the 45th Canadian Parliament
