= Laurier—Sainte-Marie =

Federal electoral district in Quebec, Canada

Coordinates: 45.527°N 73.565°W

Quebec electoral district
- Interactive map of riding boundaries from the 2025 federal election

Federal electoral district
- Legislature: House of Commons
MP
Vacant
- District created: 1987
- First contested: 1988
- Last contested: 2025
- District webpage: profile, map

Demographics
- Population (2016): 111,835
- Electors (2019): 82,524
- Area (km²): 10.40
- Pop. density (per km²): 10,753.4
- Census division: Montreal
- Census subdivision: Montreal (part)

Laurier—Sainte-Marie (French pronunciation: [lɔʁje sɛ̃tmaʁi]) is a federal electoral district in Downtown Montreal, Quebec, Canada, which has been represented in the House of Commons since the 1988 federal election. Its 2016 population was 111,835.

== Geography ==
The district includes Côte Saint-Louis and the eastern parts of the Plateau and Mile End in the Borough of Le Plateau-Mont-Royal and the eastern part of Downtown Montreal and the western part of Centre-Sud (including part of the neighbourhood of Sainte-Marie) in the Borough of Ville-Marie.

== History ==
In 1987, the district of "Laurier—Sainte-Marie" was created from Laurier, Montreal—Sainte-Marie and Saint-Jacques ridings.

In 2003, Laurier—Sainte-Marie was abolished when it was redistributed into Laurier and Hochelaga ridings.

After the 2004 election, Laurier riding was renamed "Laurier—Sainte-Marie" in 2004.

The name comes from Laurier Avenue, a street in Plateau Mont-Royal named after Wilfrid Laurier, and Sainte-Marie, a former name for Centre-Sud, which in turn came from a parish church dedicated to Saint Mary.

The riding was represented by Gilles Duceppe, leader of the Bloc Québécois, until 2011, when he was defeated by Hélène Laverdière of the New Democratic Party.

This riding lost territory to Outremont and Ville-Marie—Le Sud-Ouest—Île-des-Sœurs, and gained territory from Hochelaga, Westmount—Ville-Marie and Outremont during the 2012 electoral redistribution.

Following the 2022 Canadian federal electoral redistribution, the riding lost the territory south of Av. Christophe-Colombe and west of Rue Rachel to Outremont; gained territory north of Boul. Robert-Bourassa and east of Av. Viger (including Saint Helen's Island and Notre Dame Island) from Ville-Marie—Le Sud-Ouest—Île-des-Soeurs.

=== Former boundaries ===
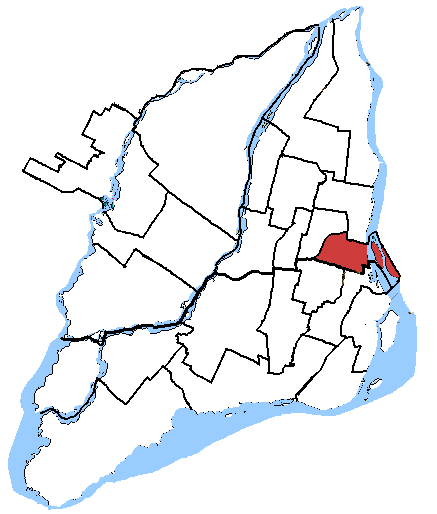
2004 to 2011 election

== Demographics ==
According to the 2021 Canadian census, 2023 representation order

Racial groups: 73.4% White, 5.1% Black, 4.4% Arab, 4.3% Latin American, 3.7% Chinese, 3.1% South Asian, 1.7% Southeast Asian, 1.2% Indigenous
Languages: 67.2% French, 15.7% English, 4.3% Spanish, 2.8% Arabic, 1.6% Mandarin, 1.2% Portuguese, 1.1% Cantonese
Religions: 36.4% Christian (29.1% Catholic, 1.2% Christian Orthodox, 6.1% Other), 6.8% Muslim, 1.2% Buddhist, 1.1% Jewish, 52.7% None
Median income: $39,600 (2020)
Average income: $55,000 (2020)

== Riding associations ==
Riding associations are the local branches of political parties:

Party	Association name	CEO	HQ City
Conservative	Association du Parti conservateur de Laurier—Sainte-Marie	Philip Mastromatteo	Mirabel
Green	Association du parti vert de Laurier—Sainte-Marie	David H.J. MacFarquhar	Montreal
Liberal	Association libérale fédérale de Laurier—Sainte-Marie	Bernard Bourget	Montreal
New Democratic	Association NPD Laurier—Sainte-Marie	Sebastien Pentland-Hyde	Montreal

== Members of Parliament ==
This riding has elected the following members of Parliament:

Parliament	Years	Member	Party
Laurier—Sainte-Marie; Riding created from Laurier, Montreal—Sainte-Marie and Saint-Jacques
34th	1988–1990	Jean-Claude Malépart	Liberal
34th	1990–1993	Gilles Duceppe	Independent
35th	1993–1997	Gilles Duceppe	Bloc Québécois
36th	1997–2000	Gilles Duceppe	Bloc Québécois
37th	2000–2004	Gilles Duceppe	Bloc Québécois
Laurier
38th	2004–2006	Gilles Duceppe	Bloc Québécois
Laurier—Sainte-Marie
39th	2006–2008	Gilles Duceppe	Bloc Québécois
40th	2008–2011	Gilles Duceppe	Bloc Québécois
41st	2011–2015	Hélène Laverdière	New Democratic
42nd	2015–2019	Hélène Laverdière	New Democratic
43rd	2019–2021	Steven Guilbeault	Liberal
44th	2021–2025	Steven Guilbeault	Liberal
45th	2025–2026	Steven Guilbeault	Liberal

== Election results ==
Canadian federal by-election, December 7, 2026 Resignation of Steven Guilbeault
The by-election will be held on December 7, 2026.
Party	Candidate	Votes	%	±%
Liberal	Guy Cormier			
New Democratic	Nimâ Machouf			
Bloc Québécois	Zumretay Arkin			
Conservative	TBD			
Green	TBD			
People's	TBD			
Total valid votes				
Total rejected ballots				
Turnout				
Eligible voters				
Source: Elections Canada

2025 Canadian federal election
Party	Candidate	Votes	%	±%	Expenditures
Liberal	Steven Guilbeault	27,286	52.07	+12.57	$96,925.97
New Democratic	Nimâ Machouf	9,856	18.81	−11.62	$81,258.28
Bloc Québécois	Emmanuel Lapierre	8,079	15.42	−4.72	$37,025.22
Conservative	Mathieu Fournier	4,796	9.15	+4.66	$24.40
Green	Dylan Perceval-Maxwell	1,452	2.77	+0.54	$7,445.70
Marxist–Leninist	Michel Labelle	269	0.51	+0.35	$0.00
People's	Eugène Duplessis	253	0.48	−1.28	$971.89
Rhinoceros	Chantal Poulin	195	0.37	N/A	$0.00
Communist	Adrien Welsh	115	0.22	+0.03	$0.00
Independent	Simon-Pierre Lauzon	62	0.12	N/A	$245.00
Independent	Dimitri Mourkes	38	0.07	N/A	none listed
Total valid votes		52,401	98.86	+0.10	$128,761.60
Total rejected ballots		602	1.14	-0.10	
Turnout		53,003	64.02	+7.74	
Eligible voters		82,797			
Liberal notional hold		Swing		+12.09	
Source: Elections Canada

2021 federal election redistributed results
Party	Vote	%
Liberal	17,689	39.51
New Democratic	13,625	30.43
Bloc Québécois	9,015	20.13
Conservative	2,013	4.50
Green	997	2.23
People's	791	1.77
Free	224	0.50
Animal Protection	181	0.40
Communist	87	0.19
Marxist-Leninist	74	0.17
Independent	69	0.15
Marijuana	11	0.02
Total valid votes	44,776	98.76
Rejected ballots	560	1.24
Registered voters/ estimated turnout	80,560	56.28

2021 Canadian federal election
Party	Candidate	Votes	%	±%	Expenditures
Liberal	Steven Guilbeault	16,961	37.96	−3.8	$106,932.30
New Democratic	Nimâ Machouf	14,680	32.86	+7.67	$74,683.45
Bloc Québécois	Marie-Ève-Lyne Michel	9,114	20.40	−2.42	$43,415.93
Conservative	Ronan Reich	1,500	3.36	+0.55	$5,774.18
Green	Jean-Michel Lavarenne	992	2.22	−3.82	$0.00
People's	Daniel Tanguay	758	1.70	+1.10	$1,926.49
Free	Julie Morin	233	0.52	—	$1.77
Animal Protection	Kimberly Lamontagne	199	0.42	—	$2,642.01
Communist	Adrien Welsh	95	0.21	+0.08	$0.00
Independent	Cyril Julien	74	0.17	—	$296.44
Marxist–Leninist	Serge Lachapelle	70	0.16	−0.02	$0.00
Total valid votes/expense limit		44,676	—	—	$110,467.65
Total rejected ballots		551			
Turnout		45,227	56.81		
Registered voters		79,607			
Source: Elections Canada

2019 Canadian federal election
Party	Candidate	Votes	%	±%	Expenditures
Liberal	Steven Guilbeault	22,306	41.77	+18.11	$84,747.37
New Democratic	Nimâ Machouf	13,453	25.19	−13.08	
Bloc Québécois	Michel Duchesne	12,188	22.82	−5.89	$25,536.85
Green	Jamil Azzaoui	3,225	6.04	+2.56	
Conservative	Lise des Greniers	1,504	2.82	−1.28	
People's	Christine Bui	320	0.6	—	
Rhinoceros	Archie Morals	208	0.39	—	
Marxist–Leninist	Serge Lachapelle	98	0.18	−0.01	
Communist	Adrien Welsh	67	0.13	−0.06	$867.96
Independent	Dimitri Mourkes	42	0.08	—	
Total valid votes/expense limit		53,409	100.0		
Total rejected ballots		551			
Turnout		53,960	65.4		
Eligible voters		82,524			
Liberal gain from New Democratic		Swing		+15.60	
Source: Elections Canada

2015 Canadian federal election
Party	Candidate	Votes	%	±%	Expenditures
New Democratic	Hélène Laverdière	20,929	38.27	−8.21	$89,556.47
Bloc Québécois	Gilles Duceppe	15,699	28.71	−6.23	$57,168.55
Liberal	Christine Poirier	12,938	23.66	+12.99	$38,580.06
Conservative	Daniel Gaudreau	2,242	4.10	+0.15	$4,220.00
Green	Cyrille Giraud	1,904	3.48	+0.84	$4,793.71
Libertarian	Stéphane Beaulieu	604	1.10	–	–
Independent	Julien Bernatchez	160	0.29	–	–
Marxist–Leninist	Serge Lachapelle	103	0.19	–	–
Communist	Pierre Fontaine	102	0.19	–	–
Total valid votes/Expense limit		54,681	100.00		$221,434.26
Total rejected ballots		594	1.07	–	
Turnout		55,275	65.69	–	
Eligible voters		84,142			
New Democratic hold		Swing		−0.99	
Source: Elections Canada

2011 federal election redistributed results
Party	Vote	%
New Democratic	23,749	46.48
Bloc Québécois	17,853	34.94
Liberal	5,451	10.67
Conservative	2,019	3.95
Green	1,348	2.64
Others	677	1.32

2011 Canadian federal election
Party	Candidate	Votes	%	±%	Expenditures
New Democratic	Hélène Laverdière	23,373	46.64	+29.53	$22,982
Bloc Québécois	Gilles Duceppe	17,991	35.90	−14.34	$81,167
Liberal	Philippe Allard	4,976	9.93	−8.40	$16,728
Conservative	Charles K. Langford	1,764	3.52	−1.31	$4,611
Green	Olivier Adam	1,324	2.64	−5.28	$1,532
Rhinoceros	François Yo Gourd	398	0.79	−0.14	none listed
Communist	Sylvain Archambault	137	0.27	+0.10	$1,606
Marxist–Leninist	Serge Lachapelle	77	0.15	−0.09	none listed
Independent	Dimitri Mourkes	73	0.15		none listed
Total valid votes/expense limit		50,113	100.00		
Total rejected ballots		471	0.93		
Turnout		50,584	63.41		
Electors on the lists		79,772			
New Democratic gain from Bloc Québécois		Swing		+21.94%	
Source: Official Results, Elections Canada and Financial Returns, Elections Canada.

2008 Canadian federal election
Party	Candidate	Votes	%	±%	Expenditures
Bloc Québécois	Gilles Duceppe	24,103	50.24	−4.45	$71,127
Liberal	Sébastien Caron	8,798	18.33	+5.88	$30,225
New Democratic	François Grégoire	8,209	17.11	+0.44	$31,151
Green	Dylan Perceval-Maxwell	3,801	7.92	−0.38	$7,171
Conservative	Charles K. Langford	2,320	4.83	−1.55	$5,590
Rhinoceros	François Yo Gourd	447	0.93		$388
Marxist–Leninist	Serge Lachapelle	118	0.24	−0.03	
Independent	Daniel "F4J" Laforest	93	0.19	–	
Communist	Samie Pagé-Quirion	86	0.17	−0.03	$898
Total valid votes/expense limit		47,975	100.00	$84,641	
Total rejected ballots		406	0.84		
Turnout		48,381	61.10		

2006 Canadian federal election
Party	Candidate	Votes	%	±%	Expenditures
Bloc Québécois	Gilles Duceppe	26,773	54.69	−5.4	$74,181
New Democratic	François Grégoire	8,165	16.67	+4.6	$20,195
Liberal	Soeung Tang	6,095	12.45	−5.2	$12,436
Green	Dylan Perceval-Maxwell	4,064	8.30	+2.2	$2,265
Conservative	Carlos De Sousa	3,124	6.38	+3.8	$15,665
Marijuana	Nicky Tanguay	338	0.69	−0.5	
Independent	Jocelyne Leduc	157	0.32	*	
Marxist–Leninist	Ginette Boutet	137	0.27	−0.0	
Communist	Evelyn Elizabeth Ruiz	100	0.20	*	$926
Total valid votes/expense limit		48,953	100.00	$79,692	
Total rejected ballots		392	0.79		
Turnout		49,345	61.26		

2004 Canadian federal election
Party	Candidate	Votes	%	±%	Expenditures
Bloc Québécois	Gilles Duceppe	28,728	60.1	+7.3	$69,284
Liberal	Jean-François Thibault	8,454	17.7	−8.1	$52,945
New Democratic	François Grégoire	5,779	12.1	+7.3	$5,400
Green	Dylan Perceval-Maxwell	2,912	6.1	+1.2	$2,801
Conservative	Pierre Albert	1,224	2.6	−3.8	$4,658
Marijuana	Nicky Tanguay	572	1.2	−3.7	
Marxist–Leninist	Ginette Boutet	154	0.3	−0.3	
Total valid votes/expense limit		47,823	100.0	$79,214	
Note: Conservative vote is compared to the total of the Canadian Alliance vote and Progressive Conservative vote in the 2000 election in the riding of Laurier—Sainte-Marie.

2000 Canadian federal election
Party	Candidate	Votes	%	±%
Bloc Québécois	Gilles Duceppe	23,473	52.8	−1.9
Liberal	Jean Philippe Côté	11,451	25.7	+2.8
Green	Dylan Perceval-Maxwell	2,169	4.9	+2.5
Marijuana	Marc-Boris St-Maurice	2,156	4.8	
New Democratic	Richard Chartier	2,121	4.8	+0.3
Progressive Conservative	Jean François Tessier	1,879	4.2	−7.7
Alliance	Stéphane Prud'homme	960	2.2	
Marxist–Leninist	Ginette Boutet	269	0.6	−0.1
Total valid votes		44,478	100.0	

1997 Canadian federal election
Party	Candidate	Votes	%	±%
Bloc Québécois	Gilles Duceppe	26,546	54.7	−7.0
Liberal	David Ly	11,154	23.0	−1.6
Progressive Conservative	Yanick Deschênes	5,808	12.0	+6.6
New Democratic	François Degardin	2,180	4.5	+1.4
Independent	François Gourd	1,255	2.6	
Green	Dylan Perceval-Maxwell	1,167	2.4	−0.2
Marxist–Leninist	Serge Lachapelle	338	0.7	+0.2
Independent	Mathieu Ravignat	123	0.3	
Total valid votes		48,571	100.0	

1993 Canadian federal election
Party	Candidate	Votes	%	±%	Expenditures
Bloc Québécois	Gilles Duceppe	25,060	61.79		$39,969
Liberal	Robert Desbiens	9,940	24.51	−14.56	$41,625
Progressive Conservative	Yvan Routhier	2,156	5.32	−24.34	$19,947
New Democratic	Alain Gravel	1,237	3.05	−18.57	$5,169
Green	John Tromp	1,050	2.59	−0.93	$1,304
Natural Law	Pierre Bergeron	652	1.61		$0
Marxist–Leninist	Normand Chouinard	205	0.51	+0.19	$80
Communist League	Michel Dugré	131	0.32		$507
Commonwealth of Canada	Sophie Brassard	127	0.31	+0.12	$0
Total valid votes		40,558	100.00		
Total rejected ballots		1,592			
Turnout		42,150	71.29	+1.96	
Electors on the lists		59,126			
Source: Thirty-fifth General Election, 1993: Official Voting Results, Published by the Chief Electoral Officer of Canada. Financial figures taken from the official contributions and expenses submitted by the candidates, provided by Elections Canada. Percentage change figures are made in relation to the 1988 general election, not the 1990 by-election.

Canadian federal by-election, August 13, 1990 Death of Jean-Claude Malépart
Party	Candidate	Votes	%	±%
Independent	Gilles Duceppe	16,818	66.9	
Liberal	Denis Coderre	4,812	19.1	−19.9
New Democratic	Louise O'Neill	1,821	7.2	−14.4
Progressive Conservative	Christian Fortin	1,120	4.5	−25.2
Green	Michel Szabo	395	1.6	−1.9
Independent	Daniel Perreault	123	0.5	
Independent	Rejean Robidoux	42	0.2	
Total valid votes		25,131	100.0	

1988 Canadian federal election
Party	Candidate	Votes	%	Expenditures
Liberal	Jean-Claude Malepart	15,956	39.07	$41,754
Progressive Conservative	Charles Hamelin	12,113	29.66	$35,391
New Democratic	François Beaulne	8,828	21.62	$42,678
Rhinoceros	Sonia Chatouille Côté	2,121	5.19	$425
Green	Philippe Champagne	1,438	3.52	$0
Communist	Marianne Roy	175	0.43	$1,263
Independent Marxist-Leninist	Hélène Héroux	130	0.32	$130
Commonwealth of Canada	Daniel Gonzales	79	0.19	$0
Total valid votes		40,840	100.00	
Total rejected ballots		729		
Turnout		41,569	69.33	
Electors on the lists		59,956		
Source: Report of the Chief Electoral Officer, Thirty-fourth General Election, 1988.

== See also ==
- List of Canadian electoral districts
- Historical federal electoral districts of Canada
