= Nimâ Machouf =

Canadian-Iranian epidemiologist and politician

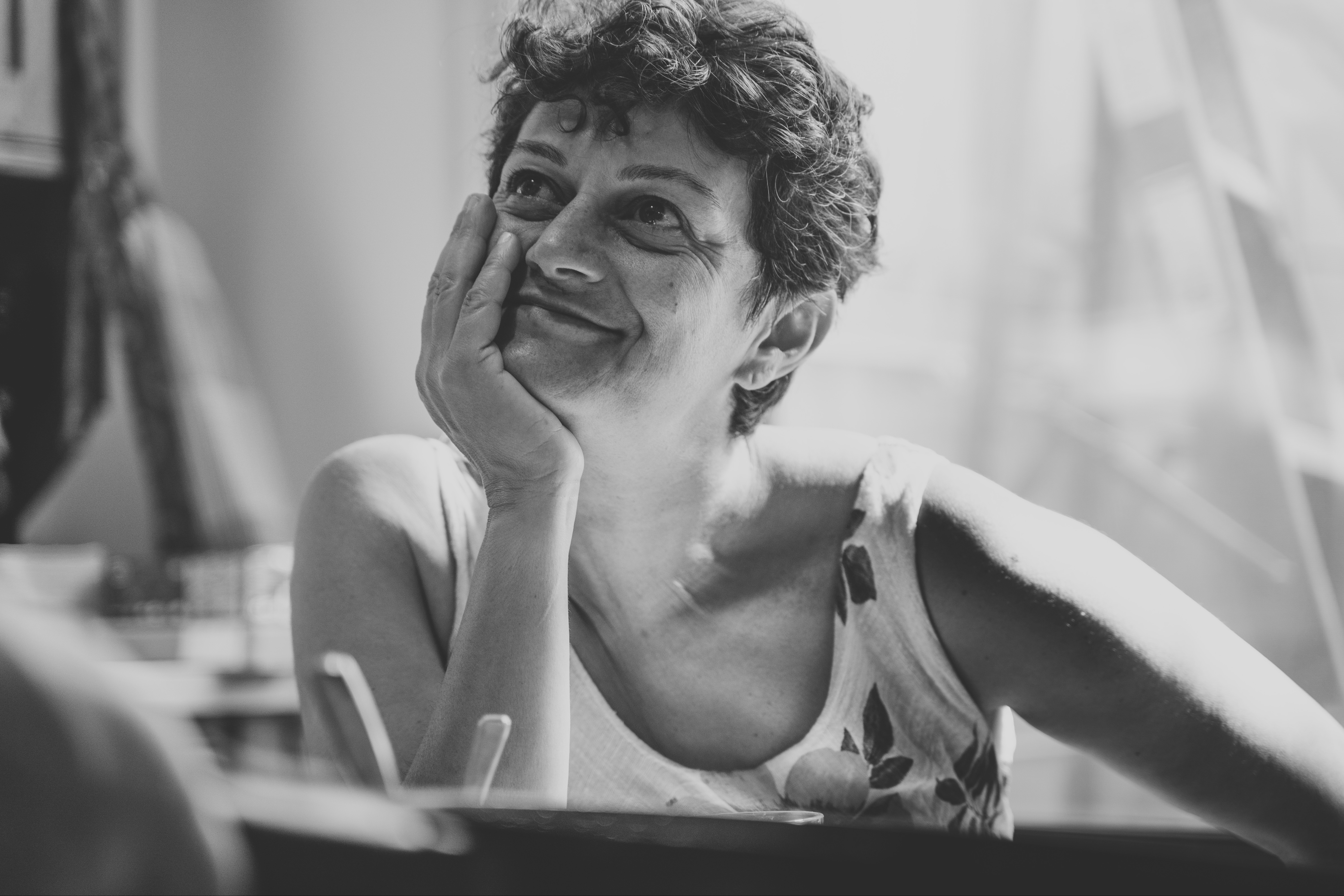
- Machouf in 2019
- Born: March 24, 1965 (age 61); France
- Education: Université de Montréal
- Occupations: Epidemiologist, politician
- Known for: HIV/AIDS research
- Political party: New Democratic
- Other political affiliations: Projet Montréal
- Spouse: Amir Khadir
- Children: 3

Nimâ Valèrie Machouf (born March 24, 1965) is a Canadian–Iranian epidemiologist and politician. She holds a doctorate in public health from the University of Montreal and specializes in international health and infectious diseases, particularly HIV/AIDS.

== Early life and education ==
Born in France, Nimâ Machouf lived in Montreal, Quebec, Canada, as a child until her parents completed their studies there. In 1973, the family moved to live in Iran. There, Machouf became an activist against government practices and fought in left-wing student movements. In 1982, following Iranian political repression, she returned to Montreal at age 18.

== Career ==
Machouf completed her bachelor's, master's and doctorate at the University of Montreal before pursuing post-doctorate studies in clinical epidemiology at McGill University. She teaches at the University of Montreal School of Public Health.

At the start of the COVID-19 pandemic, Machouf encouraged young people to get the vaccine, saying "while younger adults are less likely to get seriously ill from COVID-19, it’s important that they get vaccinated in order to prevent the transmission of the virus, especially because they tend to have a lot of contacts."

=== Activism ===
As a university student in Quebec, Machouf became involved in feminist and political movements and participated in the Marche du Pain et des Roses (Walk of Bread and Roses).

She has also maintained involvement in Montreal's Iranian community. Machouf sat for 8 years on the board of directors of Médecins du Monde.

Machouf has also participated in missions in many countries in Africa and Central America. Among other things, she joined the international observation mission for the Mexican elections held in the summer of 2018.

=== Politics ===
Through her activism in student associations promoting international solidarity, she contributed to the creation of the Union of Progressive Forces in 2002.

Machouf is a member of the federal New Democratic Party (NDP) and has run in the Quebec riding of Laurier—Sainte-Marie in the 2019, 2021, and 2025 federal elections. She makes climate change a central theme in her campaigns. She has also run in the 2005 and 2009 Montreal municipal elections under Projet Montréal. In 2026, Machouf endorsed Avi Lewis in that year's federal NDP leadership race. She is the party's candidate in the pending Laurier—Sainte-Marie federal by-election.

== Personal life ==
Machouf married Canadian politician and infectious disease physician Amir Khadir in 1988. They have three daughters.

== Selected works ==
- Machouf, Nima, Réjean Thomas, Vinh-Kim Nguyen, B. Trottier, M. R. Boulassel, M. A. Wainberg, and J. P. Routy. "Effects of drug resistance on viral load in patients failing antiretroviral therapy." Journal of medical virology 78, no. 5 (2006): 608-613.
- Aboubacrine, S. Ag, Pascal Niamba, Catherine Boileau, Maria-Victoria Zunzunegui, Nima Machouf, Vinh-Kim Nguyen, and Sélim Rashed. "Inadequate adherence to antiretroviral treatment and prevention in hospital and community sites in Burkina Faso and Mali: a study by the ATARAO group." International journal of STD & AIDS 18, no. 11 (2007): 741-747.
- Talbot, Annie, Nima Machouf, Réjean Thomas, Suzanne Marcotte, Rachel Therrien, Bernard Lessard, Serge Dufresne, and Richard Lalonde. "Switch from enfuvirtide to raltegravir in patients with undetectable viral load: efficacy and safety at 24 weeks in a Montreal cohort." Journal of Acquired Immune Deficiency Syndromes 51, no. 3 (2009): 362-364.

== Electoral record ==
Canadian federal by-election, December 7, 2026: Laurier—Sainte-Marie Resignation of Steven Guilbeault
The by-election will be held on December 7, 2026.
Party	Candidate	Votes	%	±%
Liberal	Guy Cormier			
New Democratic	Nimâ Machouf			
Bloc Québécois	Zumretay Arkin			
Conservative	Mathieu Fournier			
People's	Eugène Duplessis			
Rhinoceros	Chinook Blais-Leduc			
Independent	Jocelyn Simon Daigle			
Independent	Jean Duval			
Total valid votes				
Total rejected ballots				
Turnout				
Eligible voters				
Source: Elections Canada

2025 Canadian federal election: Laurier—Sainte-Marie
Party	Candidate	Votes	%	±%	Expenditures
Liberal	Steven Guilbeault	27,286	52.07	+12.57	$96,925.97
New Democratic	Nimâ Machouf	9,856	18.81	−11.62	$81,258.28
Bloc Québécois	Emmanuel Lapierre	8,079	15.42	−4.72	$37,025.22
Conservative	Mathieu Fournier	4,796	9.15	+4.66	$24.40
Green	Dylan Perceval-Maxwell	1,452	2.77	+0.54	$7,445.70
Marxist–Leninist	Michel Labelle	269	0.51	+0.35	$0.00
People's	Eugène Duplessis	253	0.48	−1.28	$971.89
Rhinoceros	Chantal Poulin	195	0.37	N/A	$0.00
Communist	Adrien Welsh	115	0.22	+0.03	$0.00
Independent	Simon-Pierre Lauzon	62	0.12	N/A	$245.00
Independent	Dimitri Mourkes	38	0.07	N/A	none listed
Total valid votes		52,401	98.86	+0.10	$128,761.60
Total rejected ballots		602	1.14	-0.10	
Turnout		53,003	64.02	+7.74	
Eligible voters		82,797			
Liberal notional hold		Swing		+12.09	
Source: Elections Canada

2021 Canadian federal election: Laurier—Sainte-Marie
Party	Candidate	Votes	%	±%	Expenditures
Liberal	Steven Guilbeault	16,961	37.96	-3.8	
New Democratic	Nimâ Machouf	14,680	32.86	+7.67	
Bloc Québécois	Marie-Ève-Lyne Michel	9,114	20.40	-2.42	
Conservative	Ronan Reich	1,500	3.36	+0.55	
Green	Jean-Michel Lavarenne	992	2.22	-3.82	
People's	Daniel Tanguay	758	1.70	+1.10	
Free	Julie Morin	233	0.52		
Animal Protection	Kimberly Lamontagne	199	0.42		
Communist	Adrien Welsh	95	0.21	+0.08	
Independent	Cyril Julien	74	0.17		
Marxist–Leninist	Serge Lachapelle	70	0.16	-0.02	
Total valid votes		44,676			
Total rejected ballots		551			
Turnout		45,227	56.81		
Registered voters		79,607			
Source: Elections Canada

2019 Canadian federal election: Laurier—Sainte-Marie
Party	Candidate	Votes	%	±%	Expenditures
Liberal	Steven Guilbeault	22,306	41.77	+18.11	$84,747.37
New Democratic	Nimâ Machouf	13,453	25.19	-13.08	
Bloc Québécois	Michel Duchesne	12,188	22.82	-5.89	$25,536.85
Green	Jamil Azzaoui	3,225	6.04	+2.56	
Conservative	Lise des Greniers	1,504	2.82	-1.28	
People's	Christine Bui	320	0.6	–	
Rhinoceros	Archie Morals	208	0.39	–	
Marxist–Leninist	Serge Lachapelle	98	0.18	-0.01	
Communist	Adrien Welsh	67	0.13	-0.06	$867.96
Independent	Dimitri Mourkes	42	0.08	–	
Total valid votes/expense limit		53,409	100.0		
Total rejected ballots		551			
Turnout		53,960	65.4		
Eligible voters		82,524			
Liberal gain from New Democratic		Swing		+15.60	
Source: Elections Canada
