= Jamil Azzaoui =

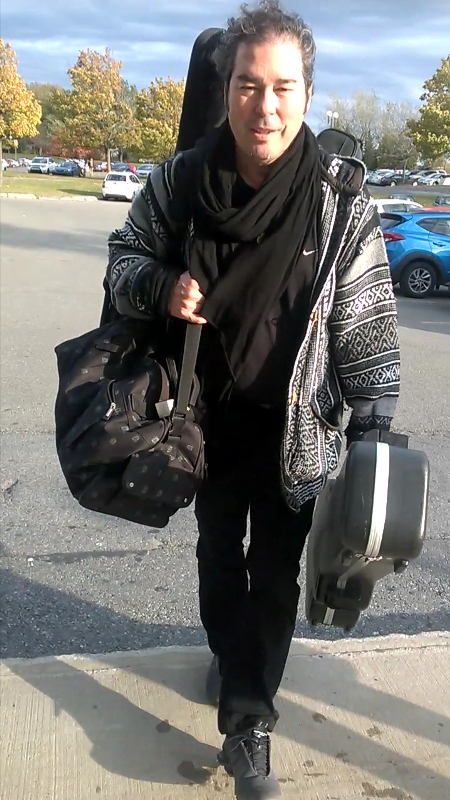

Background information
- Also known as: Jamil
- Born: 17 May 1961 (age 64); Montreal, Quebec, Canada
- Occupations: Comedian, guitarist, agent
- Instruments: Guitar
- Years active: 1981–present
- Website: www.myspace.com/jamil.azzaoui

Jamil Azzaoui (in Arabic جميل عزاوي), also known mononymously as Jamil (born 17 May 1961) is a Canadian humorous artist / comedian, musician (guitarist) and an artist agent of Moroccan origin living in Montreal and well known in France and the francophone countries.

Being born to a Muslim Moroccan father and a Québécoise Catholic mother, he lived his childhood in various countries including Egypt, France where he studied at École royale militaire de Sorèze, and Morocco, he returned to Canada and studied at Promédia, an arts school in Montreal.

After graduation, in 1981 he became a morning radio personality at CIBL-FM and later on CINQ-FM Radio Centre-Ville. In 1985, he married Catherine Karnas. Catherine, a singer, was promoted by her husband. They were divorced later. He became an agent for many artists through his company "Pépé Inc".

He also has his own series of recordings. His album Pitié pour les femmes was a big success. The follow-up Pitie pour les bums was a similar success. His song "Un signe de toi" featured in the hit parades of several stations including Rythme FM. Other humorous songs followed including "Pitié pour les femmes", "Fuck, faut qu'tu changes", "C'est pas moi ça".

In 2005, he made 100 appearances in 18 months throughout Quebec and a concert in Les FrancoFolies de Montréal and at the Lion d'or also in Montréal. In 2008, he had a show "Pitié pour les femmes" at the Olympia theatre of Montreal, He has also collaborated with many artists for various joint recordings.

He was the Green Party of Canada candidate in Laurier—Sainte-Marie for the 2019 Canadian federal election.

== Discography ==
- 1996: Pépé Inc. Greatest Hits
- 2004: Pitié pour les femmes
- 2005: Pitié pour les bums!
- 2006: Je dure... Très, très dur...
- 2009: À bas les roses!!!

== Awards and nominations ==
- Nominated for "Album of the Year (Humour)" and "Show of the Year (Humour)" at the ADISQ Annual Gala in 2009

== Electoral record ==
2019 Canadian federal election: Laurier—Sainte-Marie
Party	Candidate	Votes	%	±%	Expenditures
Liberal	Steven Guilbeault	22,306	41.77	+18.11	$84,747.37
New Democratic	Nimâ Machouf	13,453	25.19	−13.08	
Bloc Québécois	Michel Duchesne	12,188	22.82	−5.89	$25,536.85
Green	Jamil Azzaoui	3,225	6.04	+2.56	
Conservative	Lise des Greniers	1,504	2.82	−1.28	
People's	Christine Bui	320	0.6	—	
Rhinoceros	Archie Morals	208	0.39	—	
Marxist–Leninist	Serge Lachapelle	98	0.18	−0.01	
Communist	Adrien Welsh	67	0.13	−0.06	$867.96
Independent	Dimitri Mourkes	42	0.08	—	
Total valid votes/expense limit		53,409	100.0		
Total rejected ballots		551			
Turnout		53,960	65.4		
Eligible voters		82,524			
Liberal gain from New Democratic		Swing		+15.60	
Source: Elections Canada
