= Jean-Claude Malépart =

Canadian politician (1938–1989)

Member of Parliament for Laurier—Sainte-Marie
- In office 21 November 1988 – 16 November 1989
- Preceded by: Jacques Lavoie
- Succeeded by: Gilles Duceppe

Member of Parliament for Montreal—Sainte-Marie (Sainte-Marie; 1979–1984)
- In office 22 May 1979 – 20 November 1988
- Preceded by: Jacques Lavoie
- Succeeded by: Gilles Duceppe

Member of the National Assembly of Quebec for Sainte-Marie
- In office 29 October 1973 – 14 November 1976
- Preceded by: Charles-Henri Tremblay
- Succeeded by: Guy Bisaillon

Personal details
- Born: Jean-Claude Malépart; 3 December 1938 Montreal, Quebec, Canada
- Died: 16 November 1989 (aged 50) Montreal, Quebec, Canada
- Party: Liberal
- Profession: Social Worker; Administrator

Jean-Claude Malépart (3 December 1938 – 16 November 1989) was a French Canadian politician. He was a member of the National Assembly of Quebec from 1973 to 1976 and of the House of Commons of Canada from 1979 until his death.

== Life and career ==
Born in Montreal, Quebec, he was the son of Charles-Auguste Malépart and Germaine Mérineau. Both his parents died during his childhood: his mother died shortly after he was born, and his father died fourteen years later. He grew up in the Sainte-Marie district.

Malépart was elected to the National Assembly of Quebec in the riding of Sainte-Marie in the 1973 election, after losing the 1970 election. He was defeated in the 1976 election.

A member of the House of Commons of Canada representing the ridings of Sainte-Marie (later Montreal—Sainte-Marie), and Laurier—Sainte-Marie, he was elected in the 1979, 1980, 1984, and 1988 federal elections. A Liberal, he was the Parliamentary Secretary to the Minister of Public Works from 1982 to 1984.

Malépart and his wife, Pierrette Giard, had two daughters. Their daughter Nathalie Malépart ran as the Liberal Party of Quebec candidate in a 2006 by-election in the riding of Sainte-Marie–Saint-Jacques. She lost to the Parti Québécois candidate, Martin Lemay.

== Death ==
Malépart died from lung cancer at Hôpital Notre-Dame on 16 November 1989, aged 50. He is buried in the Notre Dame des Neiges Cemetery.

His seat was won by Gilles Duceppe in the by-election.

== Electoral record (partial) ==
1988 Canadian federal election: Laurier—Sainte-Marie
Party	Candidate	Votes	%	Expenditures
Liberal	Jean-Claude Malepart	15,956	39.07	$41,754
Progressive Conservative	Charles Hamelin	12,113	29.66	$35,391
New Democratic	François Beaulne	8,828	21.62	$42,678
Rhinoceros	Sonia Chatouille Côté	2,121	5.19	$425
Green	Philippe Champagne	1,438	3.52	$0
Communist	Marianne Roy	175	0.43	$1,263
Independent Marxist-Leninist	Hélène Héroux	130	0.32	$130
Commonwealth of Canada	Daniel Gonzales	79	0.19	$0
Total valid votes		40,840	100.00	
Total rejected ballots		729		
Turnout		41,569	69.33	
Electors on the lists		59,956		
Source: Report of the Chief Electoral Officer, Thirty-fourth General Election, 1988.
