= 1990 Laurier—Sainte-Marie federal by-election =

Federal by-election in Quebec, Canada

- August 13, 1990

Seat of Laurier—Sainte-Marie
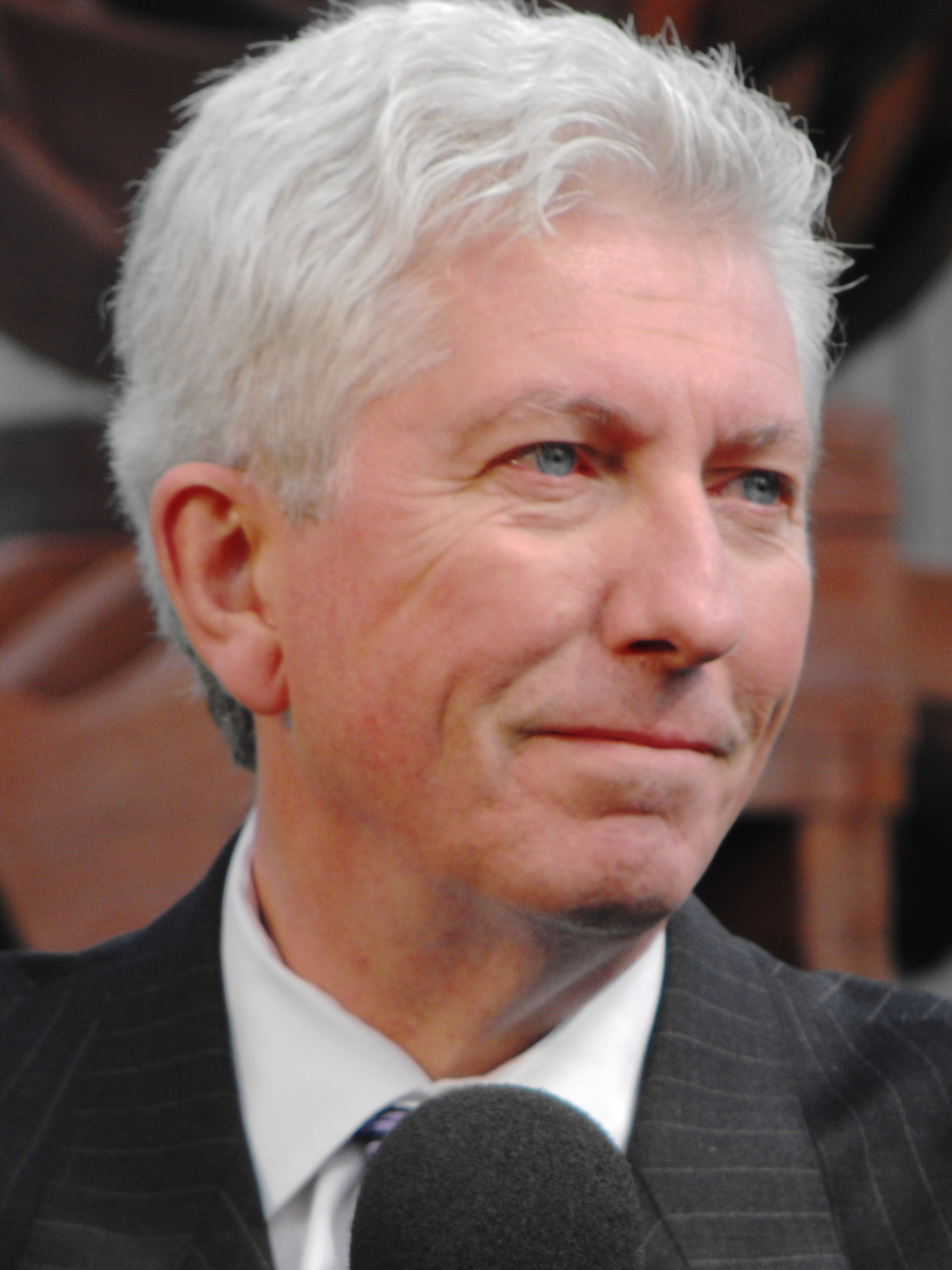

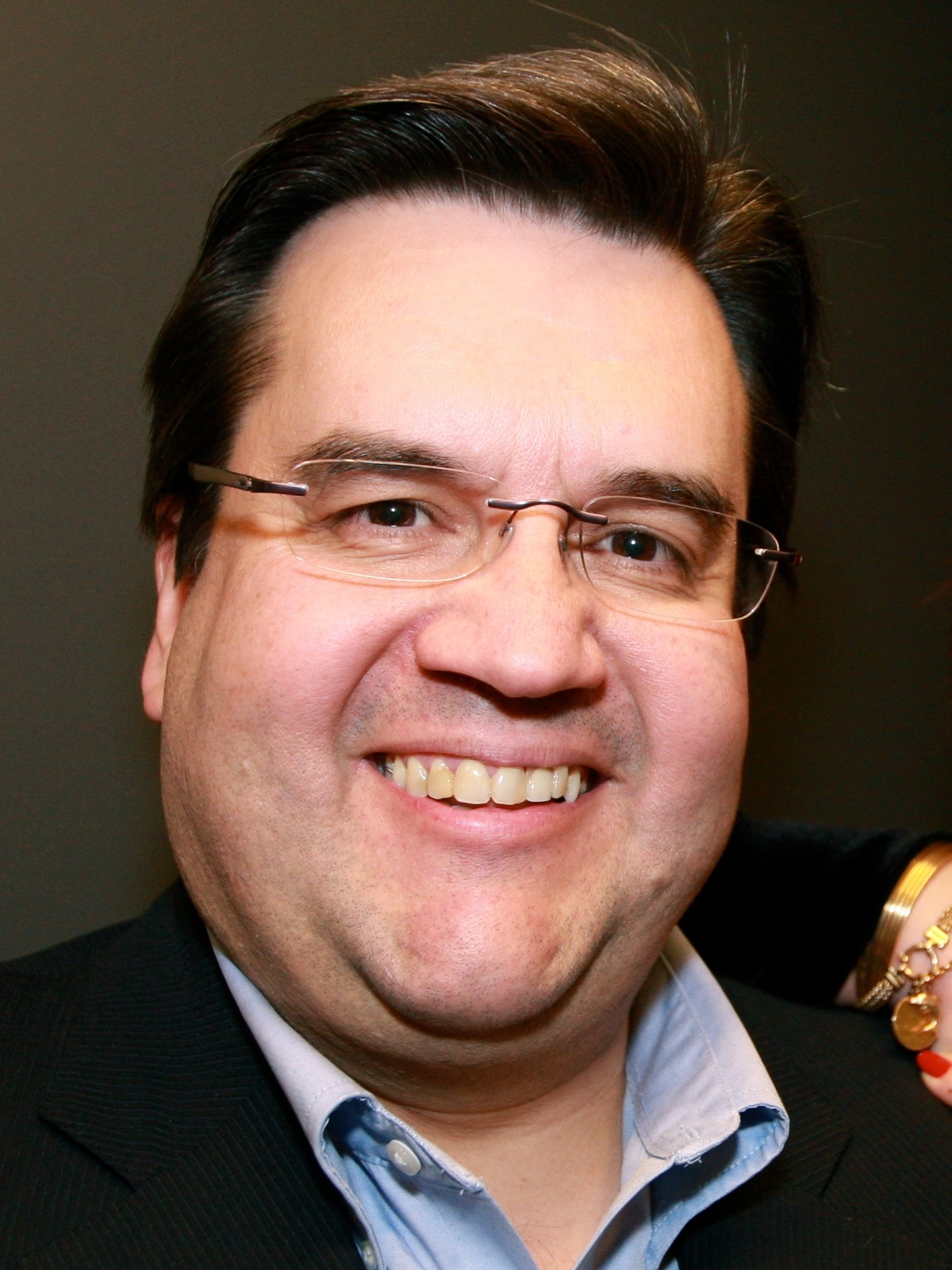
	First party	Second party	Third party
			NDP
Candidate	Gilles Duceppe	Denis Coderre	Louise O'Neill
Party	Independent	Liberal	New Democratic
Alliance	Bloc Québécois
Popular vote	16,818	4,812	1,821
Percentage	66.92%	19.15%	7.25%
Swing	N/A	▼19.9pp	▼14.4pp
MP before election
Jean-Claude Malépart
Liberal
Elected MP
Gilles Duceppe
Bloc Québécois

A by-election was held in the federal riding of Laurier—Sainte-Marie in Quebec on August 13, 1990, following the death of Liberal MP Jean-Claude Malépart.

The by-election was held on the same day as another in Oshawa in Ontario. The seat was won by Independent candidate Gilles Duceppe, who later co-founded the Bloc Québécois in February 1991.

== Election results ==
Canadian federal by-election, August 13, 1990: Laurier—Sainte-Marie Death of Jean-Claude Malépart
Party	Candidate	Votes	%	±%
Independent	Gilles Duceppe	16,818	66.9	
Liberal	Denis Coderre	4,812	19.1	−19.9
New Democratic	Louise O'Neill	1,821	7.2	−14.4
Progressive Conservative	Christian Fortin	1,120	4.5	−25.2
Green	Michel Szabo	395	1.6	−1.9
Independent	Daniel Perreault	123	0.5	
Independent	Rejean Robidoux	42	0.2	
Total valid votes		25,131	100.0	

== 1988 result ==
1988 Canadian federal election: Laurier—Sainte-Marie
Party	Candidate	Votes	%	Expenditures
Liberal	Jean-Claude Malepart	15,956	39.07	$41,754
Progressive Conservative	Charles Hamelin	12,113	29.66	$35,391
New Democratic	François Beaulne	8,828	21.62	$42,678
Rhinoceros	Sonia Chatouille Côté	2,121	5.19	$425
Green	Philippe Champagne	1,438	3.52	$0
Communist	Marianne Roy	175	0.43	$1,263
Independent Marxist-Leninist	Hélène Héroux	130	0.32	$130
Commonwealth of Canada	Daniel Gonzales	79	0.19	$0
Total valid votes		40,840	100.00	
Total rejected ballots		729		
Turnout		41,569	69.33	
Electors on the lists		59,956		
Source: Report of the Chief Electoral Officer, Thirty-fourth General Election, 1988.
