= Les Foufounes Électriques =

Alternative nightclub and concert venue in Montreal, Quebec

- Foufs
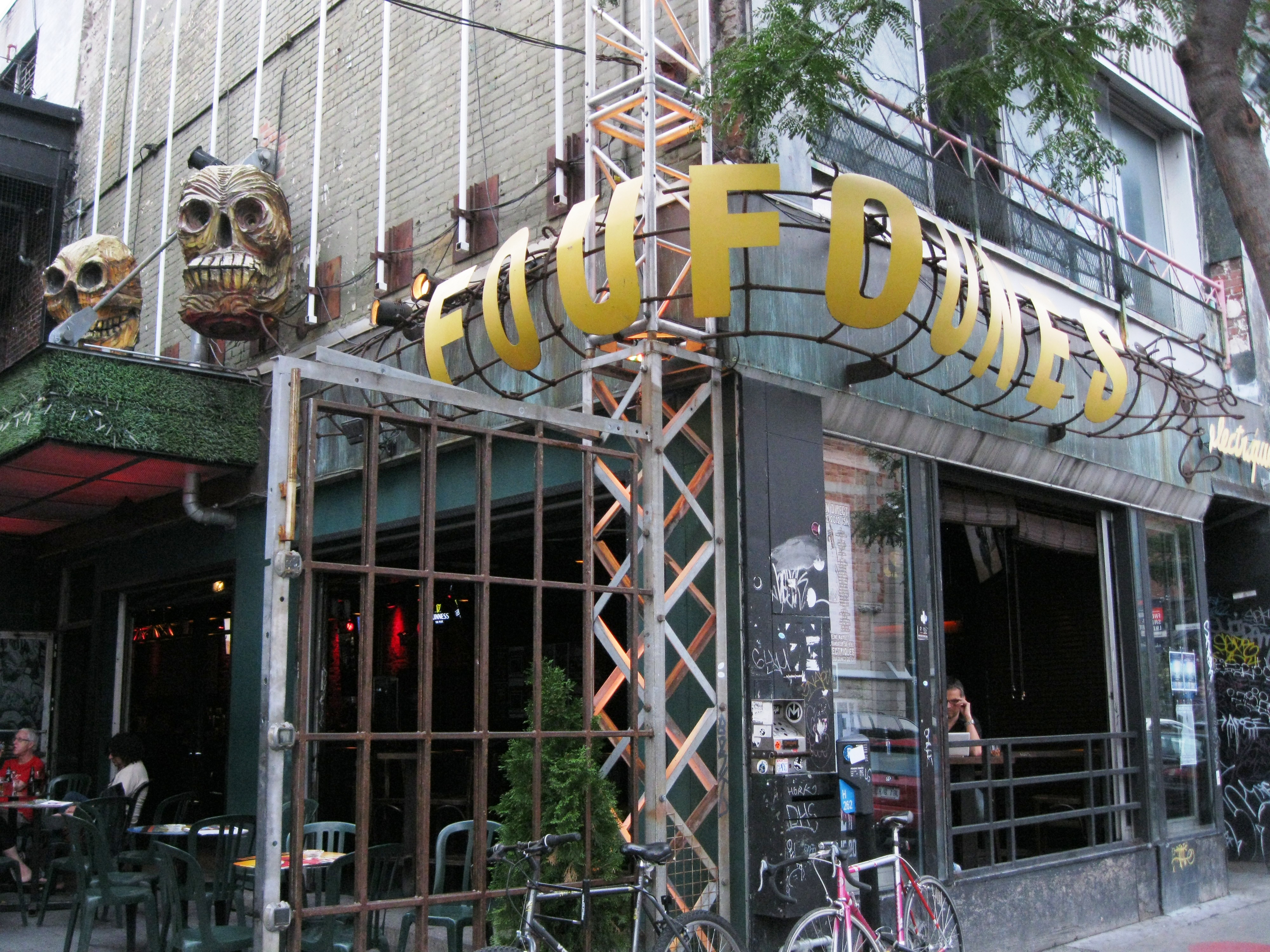
- Entrance to Les Foufounes Électriques
- Interactive map of Les Foufounes Électriques
- Address: 87 Sainte-Catherine Street East; Montreal; Canada
- Coordinates: 45.511°N 73.563°W
- Type: Alternative nightclub, bar, and concert venue

Construction
- Opened: 1983

Website
- www.foufouneselectriques.com

Les Foufounes Électriques, commonly known as Foufs, is an alternative nightclub, bar, and concert venue located at 87 Saint Catherine Street East in Montreal, Quebec, Canada, in the city's Quartier Latin.

Opened in 1983, the venue became one of Montreal's best-known centres of underground music, punk subculture, goth subculture, alternative rock, and countercultural nightlife.

The venue is frequently regarded as Montreal's oldest continuously operating alternative rock venue and one of the most significant institutions in Quebec underground culture.

The venue's graffiti-covered walls, unconventional decor, live performances, and association with Montreal's punk and alternative scenes have contributed to its prominence in the city's independent nightlife and artistic counterculture scene.

== History ==
=== Founding ===
Les Foufounes Électriques was founded in 1983 by Norman Boileau, François Gourd, and Bernard Paquet, three friends associated with the same musical theatre troupe. The founders envisioned the venue as a hybrid nightclub, artistic performance space, and showcase for emerging underground musicians and experimental artists.

In its earliest years, the venue became known for live art happenings and experimental visual performances, including sessions known as Peinture en Direct ("live painting"), in which artists painted directly onto walls, canvases, and human bodies. Over time, the building evolved into a constantly changing visual environment filled with graffiti, murals, posters, sculptures, and improvised artistic installations.

François Gourd later stated that the establishment initially generated little profit and that he sold his ownership stake after approximately five years. By the end of the 1980s, Norman Boileau was the sole remaining original owner.

=== Name ===
The name Les Foufounes Électriques is Quebec French and is commonly translated as "The Electric Buttocks".

According to a 2008 article published in The Guardian, the name originated from the founders' habit of exhibiting painted buttocks inside old television sets during performance-art events.

The provocative name became closely associated with the venue's irreverent identity, anti-establishment atmosphere, and connection to Montreal underground culture.

== Venue and atmosphere ==
Les Foufounes Électriques is a multi-level venue containing two concert rooms, bars, and a dance floor.

The interior became known for its dense graffiti-covered walls, industrial aesthetic, dark lighting, unconventional furnishings, and layered accumulation of posters, paintings, and sculptures. Unlike mainstream commercial clubs, Foufs cultivated a deliberately rough and anti-polished appearance rooted in punk and do-it-yourself artistic culture.

Its atmosphere and decor became central parts of the venue's identity, helping establish it as one of Montreal's most visually recognizable underground nightlife spaces.

== Music and performances ==
=== Alternative and underground scenes ===
During the 1980s and 1990s, Les Foufounes Électriques became one of the principal gathering places for Montreal's punk, goth, industrial, grunge, and alternative communities.

Although primarily associated with punk and alternative rock, the venue hosted a broad range of underground musical genres, including new wave, reggae, ska, industrial music, hardcore punk, metalcore, grunge, and hip hop.

The venue became especially popular among younger audiences, including students from Montreal's colleges and universities.

=== Notable performers ===
The venue hosted performances by many internationally recognized artists, including Nirvana, Green Day, Queens of the Stone Age, Mano Negra, The Dickies, William S. Burroughs, and Marianne Faithfull.

Les Foufounes Électriques also played an important role in the development of Montreal and Quebec alternative music scenes. Local and regional acts closely associated with the venue included Me Mom and Morgentaler, one of Quebec's most influential ska and alternative bands of the late 1980s and early 1990s.

The venue was also associated with Montreal underground acts such as GrimSkunk, Groovy Aardvark, Banlieue Rouge, and the Doughboys, helping establish Foufs as a major incubator for Quebec punk, ska, crossover, and alternative rock culture.

Because of its willingness to book emerging and unconventional artists, the venue became known as one of the few downtown Montreal spaces where underground bands could regularly perform before gaining wider recognition.

=== Non-musical events ===
In addition to concerts and DJ nights, the venue hosted art exhibitions, sideshows, barbecues, theme nights, performance-art gatherings, and other experimental events.

Its early use of live painting and body-based artistic performances connected the venue to Montreal's underground visual-art scene and reinforced its role as a broader countercultural institution rather than merely a music club.

== Police actions, liquor licence disputes, and temporary closures ==
Throughout its history, Les Foufounes Électriques was periodically the subject of police attention, licensing disputes, and temporary shutdowns.

Its association with punk, goth, and underground nightlife culture often placed the venue in conflict with municipal authorities and police. During the late 1980s and early 1990s, complaints related to noise, public disorder, violence, and drug activity contributed to increased scrutiny of the establishment.

According to later historical accounts, meetings took place between venue management and Montreal police in 1994 in an effort to address tensions surrounding the club's operations.

On 6 December 1994, the Régie des alcools, des courses et des jeux revoked the venue's liquor licence. The decision had severe financial consequences. In February 1995, Le Devoir reported that the establishment had entered bankruptcy proceedings after the liquor-licence revocation, with the venue being sealed and subjected to legal claims over unpaid rent.

The temporary closure became a major issue within Montreal's alternative music community because Foufs was one of the few major venues regularly supporting underground local acts. Supporters argued that the venue was being disproportionately targeted because of its countercultural clientele and non-mainstream identity.

The venue later resumed operations and survived repeated regulatory pressures, financial difficulties, and changing nightlife trends, becoming known for its resilience within Montreal underground culture.

In 2018, the establishment was temporarily ordered closed for 10 days following complaints concerning violence involving security staff. According to Eater Montreal, the venue had accumulated 44 complaints alleging excessive force by bouncers before the temporary suspension.

== Cultural significance ==
Les Foufounes Électriques became one of the most important alternative nightlife institutions in Montreal and Quebec.

For several generations, the venue served as a gathering place for punks, goths, metal fans, skaters, underground artists, students, and members of Montreal's broader countercultural communities. Its role extended beyond music, functioning as a social, artistic, and symbolic space for people outside mainstream nightlife culture.

The club's longevity became especially notable because many comparable underground venues in North America disappeared because of redevelopment, rising rents, licensing pressure, and changing nightlife patterns.

Foufs survived multiple periods of financial instability, police pressure, and downtown gentrification while maintaining a recognizable underground identity. Its persistence contributed to its reputation as a cultural institution rather than simply a bar or music venue.

The venue frequently appeared in travel guides, music journalism, documentaries, and retrospectives examining Montreal nightlife and Quebec alternative culture.

== Legacy ==
Les Foufounes Électriques has frequently been compared to influential underground venues in other North American cities because of its role in supporting independent music and countercultural communities.

Its legacy rests not only on internationally known acts that performed there, but also on its role in developing local Quebec music scenes, especially punk, ska, crossover, industrial, and alternative rock.

The venue's history reflects broader transformations in Montreal nightlife, from the punk and performance-art scenes of the 1980s to the alternative rock explosion of the 1990s and the later diversification of underground nightlife culture.

Because of its history, atmosphere, and influence, Foufs remains one of the best-known symbols of Montreal underground nightlife.

== Gallery ==
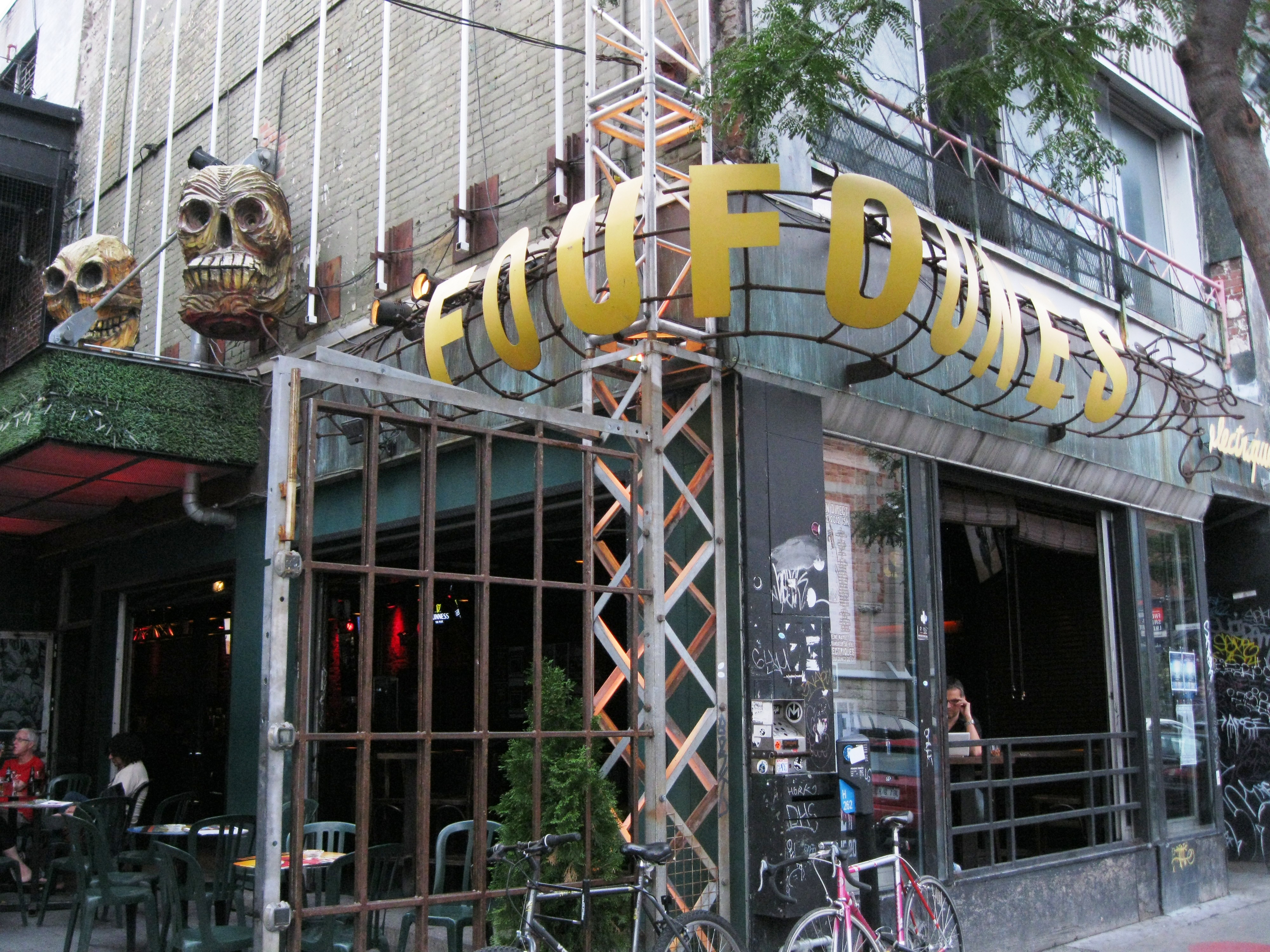
Entrance to Les Foufounes Électriques
