= Amir Khadir =

Canadian politician (born 1961)

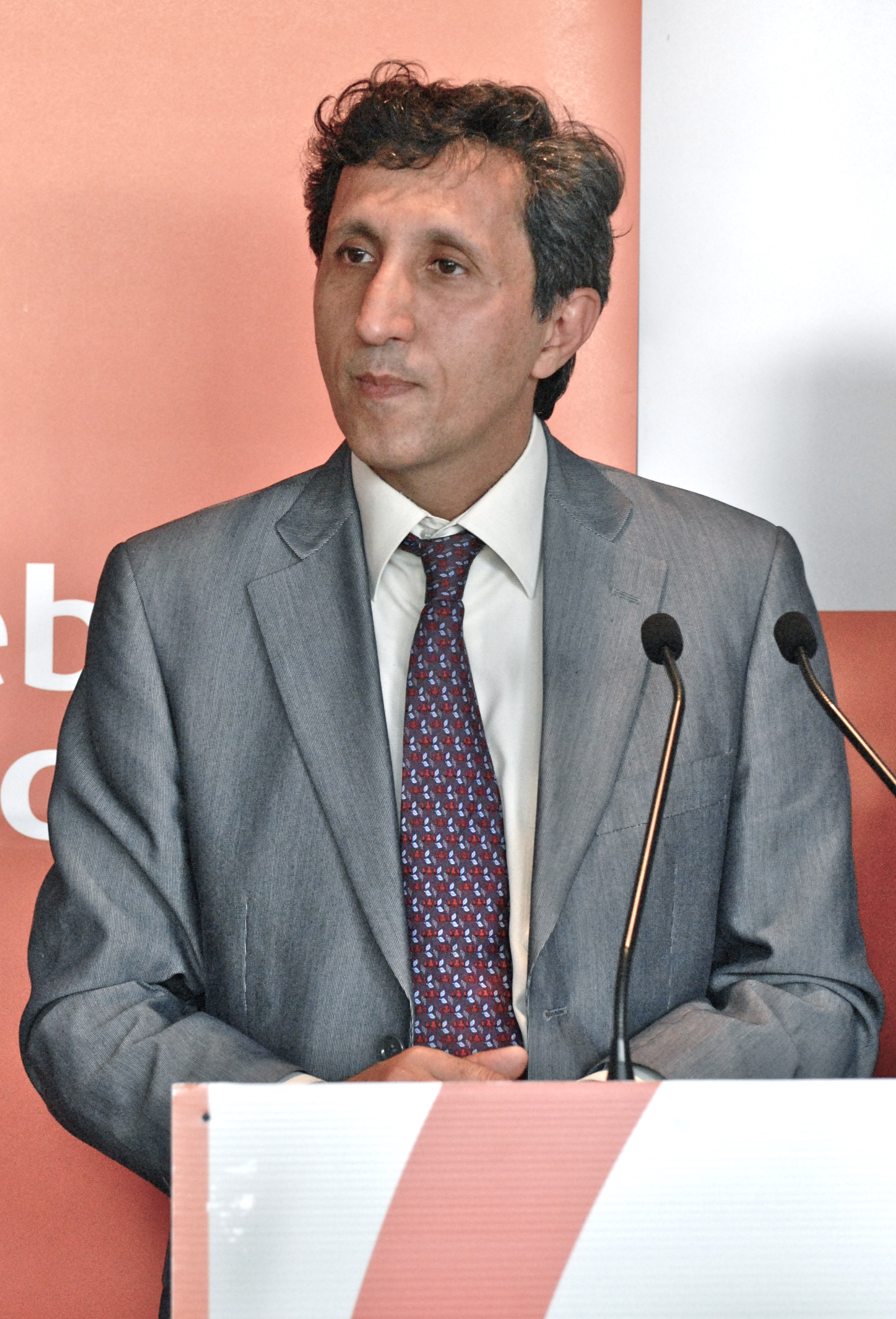

Co-spokesperson of Québec solidaire
- In office February 4, 2006 – December 2, 2012 Serving with Françoise David
- Preceded by: Position established
- Succeeded by: André Frappier (interim)

Member of the National Assembly for Mercier
- In office December 8, 2008 – October 18, 2018
- Preceded by: Daniel Turp
- Succeeded by: Ruba Ghazal

Personal details
- Born: June 12, 1961 (age 65) Tehran, Iran
- Party: Québec solidaire
- Other political affiliations: Provincial; UFP (2002–2006); RAP (1997–2002); Federal; Bloc Québécois (2000)
- Spouse: Nimâ Machouf
- Education: McGill University; Université Laval; Université de Montréal; Cégep du Vieux Montréal
- Profession: Physician, microbiologist

Amir Khadir (Persian: امیر خدیر; born June 12, 1961) is a Canadian politician in the province of Quebec. A member of Québec solidaire (QS), he was one of the party's co-spokespeople from 2006 to 2012, alongside Françoise David. From 2008 to 2018, he was a Member of the National Assembly of Quebec (MNA) for the electoral district of Mercier. Khadir was the first elected representative of QS.

== Early life and career ==
Khadir was born in Tehran, Iran in 1961 and emigrated to Canada at the age of ten. He was involved in many humanitarian organizations such as Médecins du Monde.

He studied physics at the undergraduate level at Université de Montréal and subsequently at the graduate level at McGill University. He then studied medicine at Université Laval.

Khadir worked with the Yes side in the 1980 Quebec sovereignty referendum.

A medical specialist in infectious microbiology, he practiced at the Centre Hospitalier Pierre-Le-Gardeur in Lachenaie, Quebec, a section of the city of Terrebonne, Quebec. Khadir is a member of the Coalition des Médecins pour la Justice Sociale (Coalition of Doctors for Social Justice), which opposes the privatization of the Quebec healthcare system. He has led missions to Iraq, Afghanistan, and the Palestinian territories for Médecins du Monde. Until 2004, he presided over the administrative council of Solidarité-Union-Coopération.

Khadir is married to Nimâ Machouf. They have three children named Daria, Yalda, and Leyli. During the 2012 Quebec student protests, Yalda was arrested for blocking the Jacques Cartier Bridge, occupying the Cégep du Vieux-Montréal, and vandalizing then-minister of education Line Beauchamp's office. She pleaded guilty in 2014 and, in 2015, was sentenced to a conditional discharge including 240 hours of community service.

== Political career ==
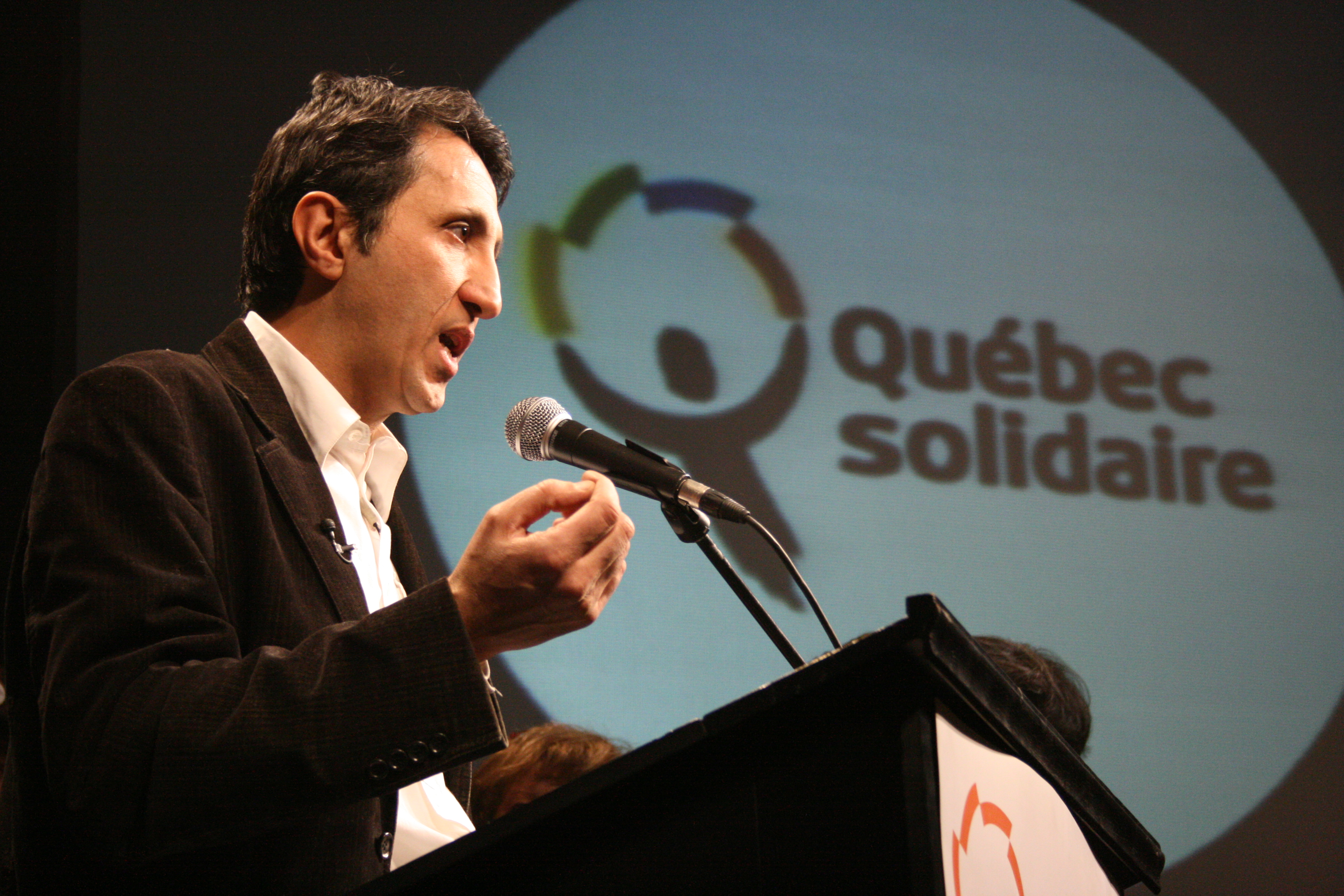
Victory speech of Amir Khadir after his election, December 8, 2008

Khadir was a member of the Rassemblement pour l'alternative progressiste from its inception in 1997. He took part in the founding of the Union des forces progressistes (UFP) in June 2002. In the 2003 provincial election, Khadir ran for office as a UFP candidate in the Montreal-based district of Mercier, and finished third with 18% of the vote. In 2004, Khadir was named co-spokesman of the UFP, alongside Denise Veilleux. In the fall of 2005, Khadir signed the Manifeste pour un Québec solidaire, a left-wing response to Pour un Québec lucide.

In 2006, the UFP merged with Option citoyenne, led by Françoise David, to form Québec solidaire (QS). At the founding convention, Khadir was named one of two co-spokespeople alongside David.

Khadir again ran for the seat of Mercier in the 2007 election, now as a member of QS, placing second with 29% of the vote. In 2008, Khadir won the seat with 38% of the vote and became the first Québec solidaire candidate elected. During that campaign, Khadir received the endorsement of Robert Perreault, a former Parti québécois cabinet member who represented Mercier from 1994 to 2000.

As the only elected member of QS, he became its most prominent member. A poll conducted for the newspapers Le Devoir and The Gazette in early December 2010 found that Khadir was the most popular politician in Quebec, with an approved rating of 45%.

Khadir continued as co-spokesperson through the 2012 election which saw the election of a second QS MNA, Françoise David, in Gouin. Shortly after the election, Khadir stepped down as co-spokesperson to allow the party to choose a new male co-spokesperson from outside the legislature in accordance with party statutes. "It's the logical next step. First, for a party that considers itself feminist, it would be fairly contradictory to finally have a female deputy of Françoise's quality in the National Assembly and not have her be the spokesperson," Khadir said.

Khadir did not run for re-election in the 2018 general election.

In 2026, Khadir endorsed Avi Lewis in that year's federal NDP leadership race.

== Activism and controversies ==
=== Quebec's Cooperation Accord with Israel ===
Amir Khadir has advocated for a petition addressed to the National Assembly, urging the suspension of Quebec's Cooperation Accord with Israel. The campaign has garnered support from organizations such as the Centrale de syndicats du Quebec, the FFQ, and Quebec Solidaire. However, this initiative triggered some backlash, with allegations of anti-Semitism directed at Amir Khadir due to his support for the BDS campaign.

=== 2010 Haiti earthquake ===
In August 2010, Khadir was a signatory of an open letter to French President Nicolas Sarkozy urging that France pay almost $23 billion in slavery reparations to help Haiti rebuild following the 2010 Haiti earthquake.

=== Boycott of Le Marcheur ===
In December 2010, Khadir participated in protests organized by the Palestinian and Jewish Unity (PAJU) that were held outside the Boutique Le Marcheur, a shoe store in Montreal, because the store sells shoes made in Israel. The protesters said they would continue to demonstrate outside the store until it stops selling shoes made in Israel. The store's owners, Yves Archambault and Ginette Auger, dismissed the protest, stating that "No one – no one is going to dictate to me what to sell. Archambault sharply criticized Khadir, stating that he found it "horrible" that his MNA representative verbally incited customers not to enter his store. Archambault responded that Israeli products constitute only 2% of his store's goods, but announced that he would not give in to the protesters' demands.

On February 9, 2011, a motion was brought forward in the Quebec National Assembly to condemn the boycott of Le Marcheur. Khadir was the sole MNA to vote against it and prevent its from being debated (unanimity is required for such a motion to go to debate). Several members of the National Assembly's other three parties: François Bonnardel of the Action Démocratique du Québec, the Parti Québécois's Martin Lemay and the Liberal party's Lawrence Bergman subsequently visited the store to show their support and demonstrate their opposition to the boycott.

Khadir later defended his support for boycotts of Israeli products but insisted there had been a "terrible misunderstanding" between himself and Archambault. Khadir denied asking people not to enter the store but stated that he only informed customers about the boycott. Khadir also stated that he now regrets taking part and wanted people to boycott the products, not the merchant.

=== Opposition to 2011 Royal tour ===
In a 2011 interview, Khadir expressed his opposition towards the use of tax dollars for an upcoming royal tour through Montreal and Quebec City by the newlywed Prince William, Duke of Cambridge, and Catherine, Duchess of Cambridge, referring to them as "parasites."

=== Criticism of the United States ===
Khadir has also expressed criticism of the Bush administration's policies, throwing his shoes at a picture of the president outside the U.S. Consulate at a protest in Montreal in December 2008. The event was supposed to symbolically replicate Muntadhar al-Zaidi's shoe-throwing attempt at the President in Iraq. He and other protesters then headed to the Canadian Forces recruitment center on Sainte Catherine Street and threw shoes at a photograph of American president George W. Bush. Khadir was accused of betraying the "dignity and responsibilities of a[n] MNA," though Khadir himself says his constituents expected nothing less.

== Views on the British Royal family ==
In 2011, Khadir criticized the British Royal family. During an interview with the Journal de Québec concerning an upcoming visit of recently Prince William and Catherine Middleton, Khadir said "What a waste of public funds," and "All this to welcome these parasites!". The Quebec government demanded later an apology from Khadir.

== Electoral record ==
2014 Quebec general election: Mercier
Party	Candidate	Votes	%	±%
Québec solidaire	Amir Khadir	13,228	46.19	-0.75
Liberal	Richard Sagala	6,593	23.02	+9.52
Parti Québécois	Sylvie Legault	5,872	20.5	-3.05
Coalition Avenir Québec	Alain Clavet	2,400	8.38	-2.63
Option nationale	Martin Servant	228	0.8	-1.58
Bloc Pot	Hate's Deslandes	189	0.66	–
Independent	Roger Hughes	129	0.45	–
Total valid votes		28,639	98.75	–
Total rejected ballots		362	1.25	–
Turnout		29,001	72.41	-3.86
Electors on the lists		40,052	–	–

2012 Quebec general election: Mercier
Party	Candidate	Votes	%	±%
Québec solidaire	Amir Khadir	14,164	46.73	+8.84
Parti Québécois	Jean Poirier	7,137	23.55	-10.87
Liberal	Anne Pâquet	4,091	13.50	-7.84
Coalition Avenir Québec	Julie Boncompain	3,336	11.01	+8.52*
Green	David Kovaks	859	2.83	-0.77
Option nationale	Nic Payne	722	2.38	–
Total valid votes		30,309	99.18	–
Total rejected ballots		252	0.82	–
Turnout		30,561	76.27	+20.25
Electors on the lists		40,069	–	–

* Result compared to Action démocratique

2008 Quebec general election: Mercier
Party	Candidate	Votes	%	±%
Québec solidaire	Amir Khadir	8,597	37.89	+8.51
Parti Québécois	Daniel Turp	7,787	34.32	+0.97
Liberal	Catherine Émond	4,842	21.34	+1.52
Green	Olivier Adam	818	3.60	−4.88
Action démocratique	Élisa Fortin-Toutant	565	2.49	−5.93
Parti indépendantiste	Jean-Marc Labrèche	83	0.37	–
Total valid votes		22,692	99.02	
Total rejected ballots		224	0.98	
Turnout		22,916	56.02	
Electors on the lists		40,907		
Source: Official Results, Le Directeur général des élections du Québec.

2007 Quebec general election: Mercier
Party	Candidate	Votes	%	±%
Parti Québécois	Daniel Turp	9,426	33.35	−11.91
Québec solidaire	Amir Khadir	8,303	29.38	+11.46
Liberal	Nathalie Rochefort	5,601	19.82	−8.74
Green	Sylvain Valiquette	2,398	8.48	–
Action démocratique	Gabriel Tupula Yamba	2,381	8.42	+2.12
Bloc Pot	Nicky Tanguay	156	0.55	−1.42
Total valid votes		28,265	99.17	
Total rejected ballots		237	0.83	
Turnout		28,502	69.32	
Electors on the lists		41,115		
Source: Official Results, Le Directeur général des élections du Québec.

2003 Quebec general election: Mercier
Party	Candidate	Votes	%	±%
Parti Québécois	Daniel Turp	13,334	45.26	+16.64
Liberal	Nathalie Rochefort	8,414	28.56	−6.10
UFP	Amir Khadir	5,278	17.92	-
Action démocratique	Vivian Goulder	1,855	6.30	+0.03
Bloc Pot	Lyne Rivard	579	1.97	−3.21
Total valid votes		29,460	100,00	
Parti Québécois gain from Liberal		Swing		+11.37
Source: Official Results, Le Directeur général des élections du Québec.

Earlier, in the federal election of 2000, Khadir ran as a Bloc Québécois candidate in the riding of Outremont. He received 28% of the vote and finished second against Liberal incumbent Martin Cauchon.

2000 Canadian federal election: Outremont
Party	Candidate	Votes	%	±%	Expenditures
Liberal	Martin Cauchon	18,796	47.68	−2.47	$52,920
Bloc Québécois	Amir Khadir	11,151	28.29	−0.10	$50,207
Progressive Conservative	Robert Archambault	3,190	8.09	−4.12	$3,360
New Democratic	Peter Graefe	2,199	5.58	−0.86	$590
Green	Jan Schotte	1,478	3.75	–	$260
Alliance	Josée Duchesneau	1,283	3.25	–	$1,425
Marijuana	Huguette Plourde	1,013	2.57	–	none listed
Marxist–Leninist	Louise Charron	194	0.49	−0.36	$10
Communist	Pierre Smith	118	0.30	–	$187
Total		39,422	100.00		
