= Hélène Laverdière =

Canadian politician (born 1955)

Shadow Minister for International Development
- In office October 22, 2012 – November 19, 2015
- Leader: Tom Mulcair
- Preceded by: Romeo Saganash
- Succeeded by: Deepak Obhrai
- In office May 26, 2011 – October 2, 2011
- Preceded by: Glen Pearson
- Succeeded by: Jinny Sims

Member of Parliament for Laurier—Sainte-Marie
- In office May 2, 2011 – September 11, 2019
- Preceded by: Gilles Duceppe
- Succeeded by: Steven Guilbeault

Personal details
- Born: April 13, 1955 (age 71) Chicoutimi, Quebec, Canada
- Party: New Democratic
- Spouse: Germain Bélanger
- Education: University of Bath (PhD)
- Occupation: Educator, diplomat, politician

Hélène Laverdière (French pronunciation: [elɛn lavɛʁdzjɛʁ]; born April 13, 1955) is a Canadian diplomat and politician who served as the member of Parliament (MP) for Laurier—Sainte-Marie from 2011 to 2019. A member of the New Democratic Party (NDP), Laverdière served as the Official Opposition critic for international development.

== Education and diplomatic career ==
Laverdière obtained her Ph.D. in sociology from the University of Bath, and briefly taught in the sociology department at the Université Laval. She subsequently entered the Department of Foreign Affairs in 1992, serving in Washington, D.C., Dakar, Senegal and Santiago.

== Political career ==
She was elected as the MP for Laurier—Sainte-Marie in the 2011 election as a member of the NDP, defeating Bloc Québécois Leader Gilles Duceppe.

On July 9, 2018, Laverdière announced she would not run for a third term in the 2019 federal election. She told Le Devoir that she was due to turn 64 in 2019, and felt she needed to "pause for a little" and give "new blood" a chance to run.

== Electoral record ==
2015 Canadian federal election: Laurier—Sainte-Marie
Party	Candidate	Votes	%	±%	Expenditures
New Democratic	Hélène Laverdière	20,929	38.27	-8.37	–
Bloc Québécois	Gilles Duceppe	15,699	28.71	-7.19	–
Liberal	Christine Poirier	12,938	23.66	+13.73	–
Conservative	Daniel Gaudreau	2,242	4.10	+0.58	–
Green	Cyrille Giraud	1,904	3.48	+0.84	–
Libertarian	Stéphane Beaulieu	604	1.10	–	–
Independent	Julien Bernatchez	160	0.29	–	–
Marxist–Leninist	Serge Lachapelle	103	0.19	+0.04	–
Communist	Pierre Fontaine	102	0.19	-0.08	–
Total valid votes/Expense limit		54,681	100.00		$221,434.26
Total rejected ballots		594	1.07	–	
Turnout		55,275	65.69	–	
Eligible voters		84,142			
Source: Elections Canada

2011 Canadian federal election: Laurier—Sainte-Marie
Party	Candidate	Votes	%	±%	Expenditures
New Democratic	Hélène Laverdière	23,373	46.64	+29.53	$22,982
Bloc Québécois	Gilles Duceppe	17,991	35.90	−14.34	$81,167
Liberal	Philippe Allard	4,976	9.93	−8.40	$16,728
Conservative	Charles K. Langford	1,764	3.52	−1.31	$4,611
Green	Olivier Adam	1,324	2.64	−5.28	$1,532
Rhinoceros	François Yo Gourd	398	0.79	−0.14	none listed
Communist	Sylvain Archambault	137	0.27	+0.10	$1,606
Marxist–Leninist	Serge Lachapelle	77	0.15	−0.09	none listed
Independent	Dimitri Mourkes	73	0.15		none listed
Total valid votes/expense limit		50,113	100.00		
Total rejected ballots		471	0.93		
Turnout		50,584	63.41		
Electors on the lists		79,772			
New Democratic gain from Bloc Québécois		Swing		+21.94%	
Source: Official Results, Elections Canada and Financial Returns, Elections Canada.
