= François Gourd =

Canadian politician and entertainer

François "Yo" Gourd is a Canadian political figure and entertainer, who has been involved in the Rhinoceros Party of Canada and the entartistes, two satirical political movements. He has run as the Rhinoceros Party candidate in several federal elections.

In 1983 Gourd opened a bar called Les Foufounes Électriques, along with Norman Boileau and Bernard Paquet — two of Gourd's friends from a musical theatre of which he was a member. They were interested in creating a space for showcasing burgeoning alternative musicians and different types of art. According to Gourd, the bar did not turn much of a profit and he sold his share in the club after five years. By the end of the 1980s, Boileau was the only remaining owner.

In the period that followed, he became involved in cinema. His films included Masturbation libre, le manifeste in 2007.

In 2006, he founded the second iteration of the Rhinoceros Party, the successor to the historical Rhinoceros Party (which had dissolved in 1993). As the party's candidate in the September 17, 2007 federal by-election in Outremont, he listed his profession as poet on his nomination papers. He received 145 votes (0.61%). The party's activities included protesting against the construction industry.

== Electoral record ==
1979 Canadian federal election: Saint-Michel
Party	Candidate	Votes
Liberal	Marie Thérèse Killens	29,046
Social Credit	John Mitchell	4,299
New Democratic	Filippo Salvatore	2,616
Progressive Conservative	Jean-Louis Pozza	2,602
Rhinoceros	François Gourd	1,453
Union populaire	Bernard L. Longpré	432
Communist	Vittoria Bronzati	177
Marxist–Leninist	Serge Tremblay	147

Canadian federal by-election, 17 September 2007
Party	Candidate	Votes	%	±%
resignation of Jean Lapierre, 28 January 2007
New Democratic	Thomas Mulcair	11,374	47.51	+30.38
Liberal	Jocelyn Coulon	6,933	28.96	-6.17
Bloc Québécois	Jean-Paul Gilson	2,610	10.90	-17.91
Conservative	Gilles Duguay	2,052	8.57	-4.27
Green	François Pilon	529	2.20	-2.59
Rhinoceros	François Yo Gourd	145	0.61	–
Independent	Mahmood Raza Baig	78	0.33	–
Independent	Jocelyne Leduc	67	0.28	–
Canadian Action	Alexandre Amirizian	45	0.19	–
Independent	Romain Angeles	43	0.18	–
Independent	Régent Millette	32	0.13	+0.07
Independent	John Turmel	30	0.13	–

2008 Canadian federal election
Party	Candidate	Votes	%	±%	Expenditures
Bloc Québécois	Gilles Duceppe	24,103	50.24	−4.45	$71,127
Liberal	Sébastien Caron	8,798	18.33	+5.88	$30,225
New Democratic	François Grégoire	8,209	17.11	+0.44	$31,151
Green	Dylan Perceval-Maxwell	3,801	7.92	-0.38	$7,171
Conservative	Charles K. Langford	2,320	4.83	−1.55	$5,590
Rhinoceros	François Yo Gourd	447	0.93		$388
Marxist–Leninist	Serge Lachapelle	118	0.24	-0.03	
Independent	Daniel "F4J" Laforest	93	0.19	–	
Communist	Samie Pagé-Quirion	86	0.17	-0.03	$898
Total valid votes/Expense limit		47,975	100.00	$84,641	
Total rejected ballots		406	0.84		
Turnout		48,381	61.10		

2011 Canadian federal election
Party	Candidate	Votes	%	±%	Expenditures
New Democratic	Hélène Laverdière	23,373	46.64	+29.53	
Bloc Québécois	Gilles Duceppe	17,991	35.90	-14.34	
Liberal	Philippe Allard	4,976	9.93	-8.40	
Conservative	Charles K. Langford	1,764	3.52	-1.31	
Green	Adam Olivier	1,324	2.64	-5.28	
Rhinoceros	François Yo Gourd	398	0.79	-0.14	
Communist	Sylvain Archambault	137	0.27	+0.10	
Marxist–Leninist	Serge Lachapelle	77	0.15	-0.09	
Independent	Dimitri Mourkes	73	0.15	–	
Total valid votes/Expense limit		50,113	100.00		
Total rejected ballots		471	0.93		
Turnout		50,584	64.21		
