= Gilles Duceppe =

Canadian politician (born 1947)

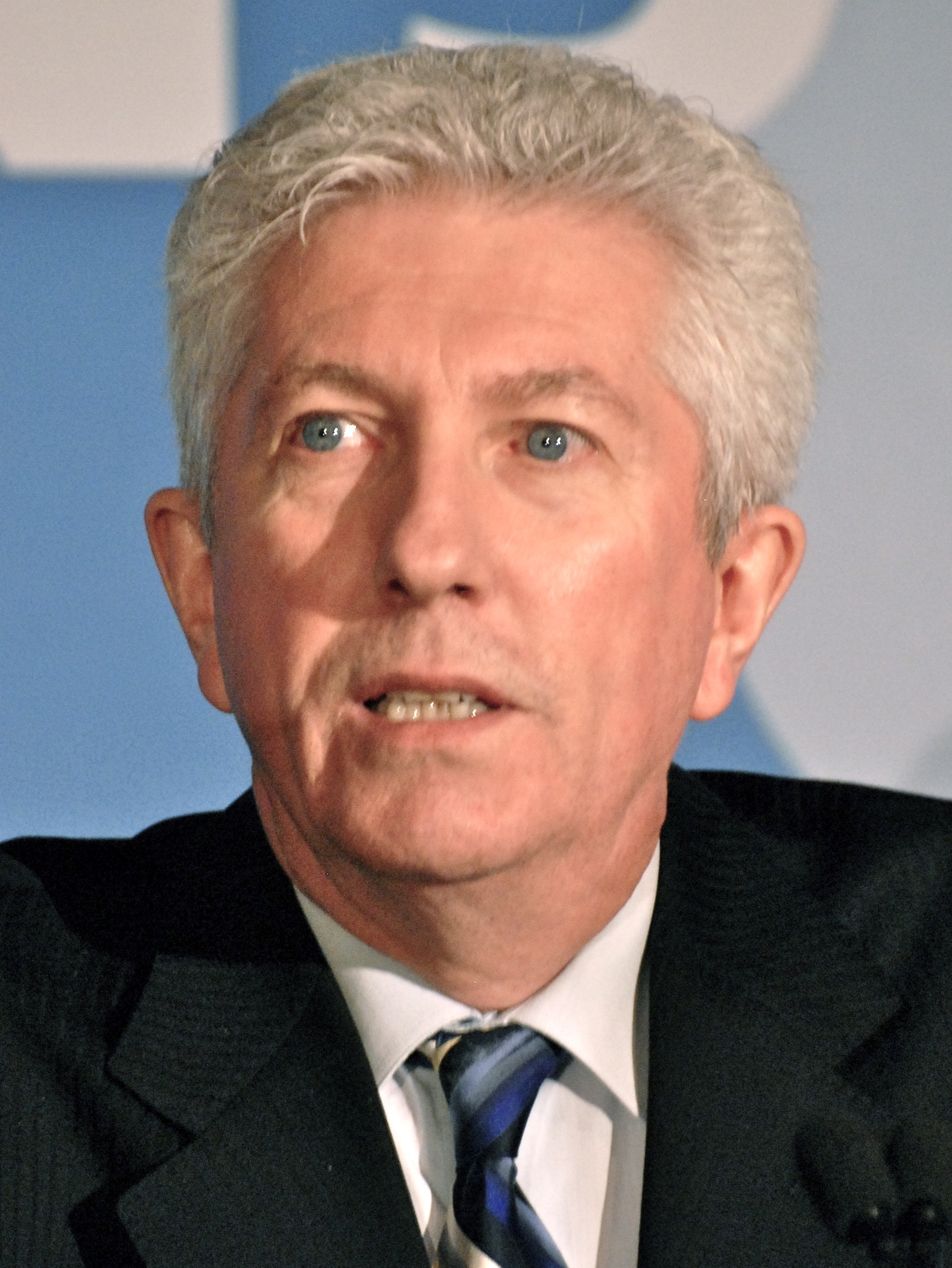
- Duceppe in 2011

Leader of the Opposition
- In office March 15, 1997 – June 1, 1997
- Preceded by: Michel Gauthier
- Succeeded by: Preston Manning
- In office January 16, 1996 – February 17, 1996
- Preceded by: Lucien Bouchard
- Succeeded by: Michel Gauthier

Leader of the Bloc Québécois
- In office June 10, 2015 – October 22, 2015
- Preceded by: Mario Beaulieu
- Succeeded by: Rhéal Fortin (interim)
- In office March 15, 1997 – May 2, 2011
- Preceded by: Michel Gauthier
- Succeeded by: Vivian Barbot (interim)
- In office January 16, 1996 – February 17, 1996 (interim)
- Preceded by: Lucien Bouchard
- Succeeded by: Michel Gauthier

Member of the Canadian Parliament for Laurier—Sainte-Marie
- In office August 13, 1990 – May 2, 2011
- Preceded by: Jean-Claude Malépart
- Succeeded by: Hélène Laverdière

Personal details
- Born: July 22, 1947 (age 79) Montreal, Quebec, Canada
- Party: Bloc Québécois
- Other political affiliations: Workers' Communist Party (formerly); Independent (1990–1993)
- Spouse: Yolande Brunelle
- Children: Amélie, Alexis
- Profession: Orderly; union organizer; political analyst

Gilles Duceppe (French pronunciation: [ʒil dzysɛp]; born July 22, 1947) is a Canadian retired politician, proponent of the Quebec sovereignty movement and former leader of the federal political party, Bloc Québécois. He was a Member of Parliament in the House of Commons of Canada for over 20 years and was the leader of the sovereigntist Bloc Québécois for 15 years in three stints: 1996, 1997–2011 and in 2015. He was Leader of the Official Opposition in the Parliament of Canada from March 17, 1997, to June 1, 1997. He resigned as party leader after the 2011 election, in which he lost his own seat to New Democratic Party (NDP) candidate Hélène Laverdière and his party suffered a heavy defeat; however, he returned four years later to lead the party into the 2015 election. After being defeated in his own riding by Laverdière again, he resigned once more.

== Early life and education ==
Duceppe was born in Montreal, Quebec, the son of Hélène (née Rowley) and actor Jean Duceppe. His maternal grandfather was John James Rowley, British by birth, Irish by descent, and a home child. Duceppe once joked about his British roots, saying, "I'm a bloke who turned Bloc."

Duceppe has told the story of an anglophone Grade 6 teacher slapping him after he complained about preferential treatment being given to anglophone students. Duceppe claimed he slapped the teacher back. He became a sovereigntist by the age of 20, inspired by René Lévesque and the founding of the Mouvement Souveraineté-Association.

Duceppe completed his high school studies at the Collège Mont-Saint-Louis. He then studied political science at the Université de Montréal but did not complete his program of study. While attending the Université de Montréal, he became general manager of the school's newspaper, Quartier Latin. In his youth, he advocated communism, and held membership in the Workers' Communist Party of Canada (WCP), a Maoist group. Duceppe later claimed that his three-year membership in the WCP was a mistake brought on by a search for absolute answers.

However, during this period (which lasted well into his thirties) he subscribed to militant Maoist ideology and was fired from his job as a hospital orderly for belligerent activities. Duceppe even went so far as to intentionally spoil his 1980 sovereignty-association referendum ballot arguing that Québécois should instead focus their efforts on staying united to fight capitalism.

=== Early career ===
Before becoming a member of Parliament, Duceppe worked as a hospital orderly and later became a trade union negotiator. In 1968 he became vice-president of the Union générale des étudiants du Québec (General Union of Quebec Students) and in 1970 manager of the Université de Montréal student paper, Quartier latin. In 1972 he launched his career in community and union settings, as moderator for the citizen's committee of Hochelaga-Maisonneuve, then in 1977 as a representative for the Royal Victoria Hospital employees. In 1981 he became a union organizer for the Confédération des syndicats nationaux (Confederation of National Trade Unions), where he became a negotiator in 1986.

== Parliament ==
=== Election ===
In 1990, Duceppe was elected to the House of Commons of Canada in a by-election for the eastern Montreal riding of Laurier—Sainte-Marie. He defeated Liberal Denis Coderre, who would later serve alongside Duceppe in Parliament before becoming Mayor of Montreal. Duceppe would be handily re-elected at each election from 1993 to 2008.

=== Tenure ===
Duceppe originally sat as an independent because the Bloc had not been registered by Elections Canada as a political party. All of the Bloc's other Members of Parliament had crossed the floor from either the Progressive Conservative Party or the Liberal Party earlier that year. Duceppe's victory demonstrated — for the first time — that the party had electoral support in Quebec and could win elections. Previously, many pundits (and members of other parties) predicted that the Bloc would not gain traction with ordinary voters in Quebec.

== Leadership of the Bloc Québécois ==
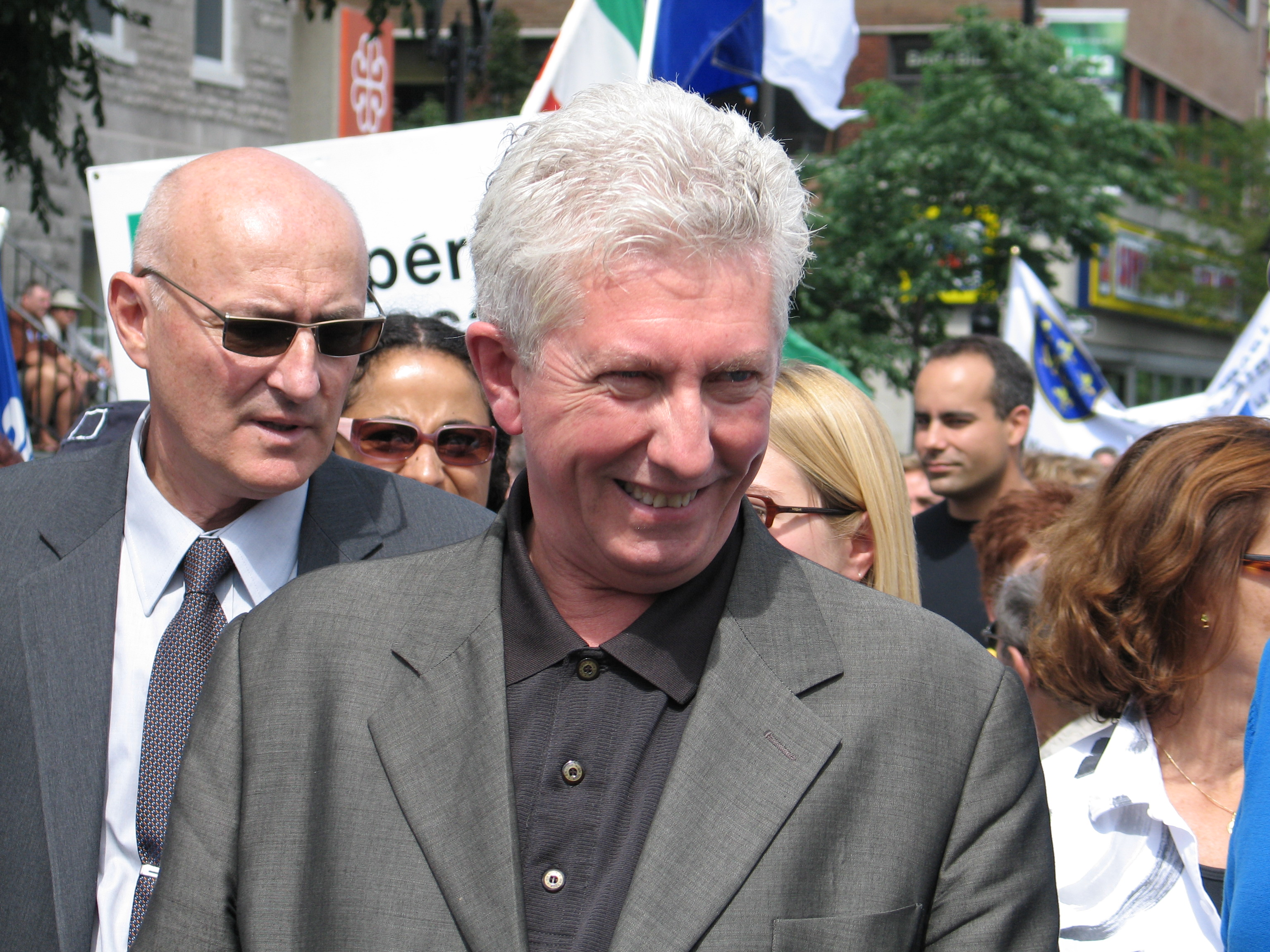
Gilles Duceppe during a 2007 protest.

In 1996, when Lucien Bouchard stepped down as Bloc leader to become leader of the Parti Québécois, Duceppe served as interim leader of the party. Michel Gauthier eventually became the official leader later that year. However, Gauthier's lack of visibility in both Quebec and English Canada coupled with his weak leadership resulted in the party forcing him out in 1997. Duceppe won the ensuing leadership contest and became the official leader of the Bloc Québécois and Leader of the Opposition.

In the 1997 general election, the Bloc lost official opposition status, slipping to third place in the House of Commons behind Preston Manning's Reform Party. During the campaign, Duceppe visited a cheese factory where he was photographed wearing a hairnet resembling a shower cap, which was widely parodied on Canadian television.

The Bloc lost more support during the 2000 election, winning just 38 seats. Over this period, critics derided Duceppe as an ineffectual campaigner, though no serious challenge to his leadership emerged.

When Jean Chrétien stepped down as Prime Minister, to be succeeded by Paul Martin, the Bloc's fortunes improved markedly, particularly after the sponsorship scandal erupted. Duceppe strongly criticized the Liberals over the misuse and misdirection of public funds intended for government advertising in Quebec. During the election's national debates, Duceppe's lucid explanations of Bloc Québécois policies and his chastising of the other national party leaders' promises, resulted in both the French and English media ruling him the best speaker. In the 2004 election, Duceppe's Bloc won 54 seats in the Commons, equalling what it had won in its 1993 breakthrough, while Martin's Liberals were reduced to a minority government.

With Chrétien's departure, Duceppe became the longest-serving leader of a major party in Canada. With the recent success of the Bloc, and his recently well-received performance as leader, speculation mounted that Duceppe might seek the leadership of the Parti Québécois – particularly when Bernard Landry stepped down as party leader on June 4, 2005. On June 13, 2005, Duceppe announced that he would not run for the leadership of the PQ.

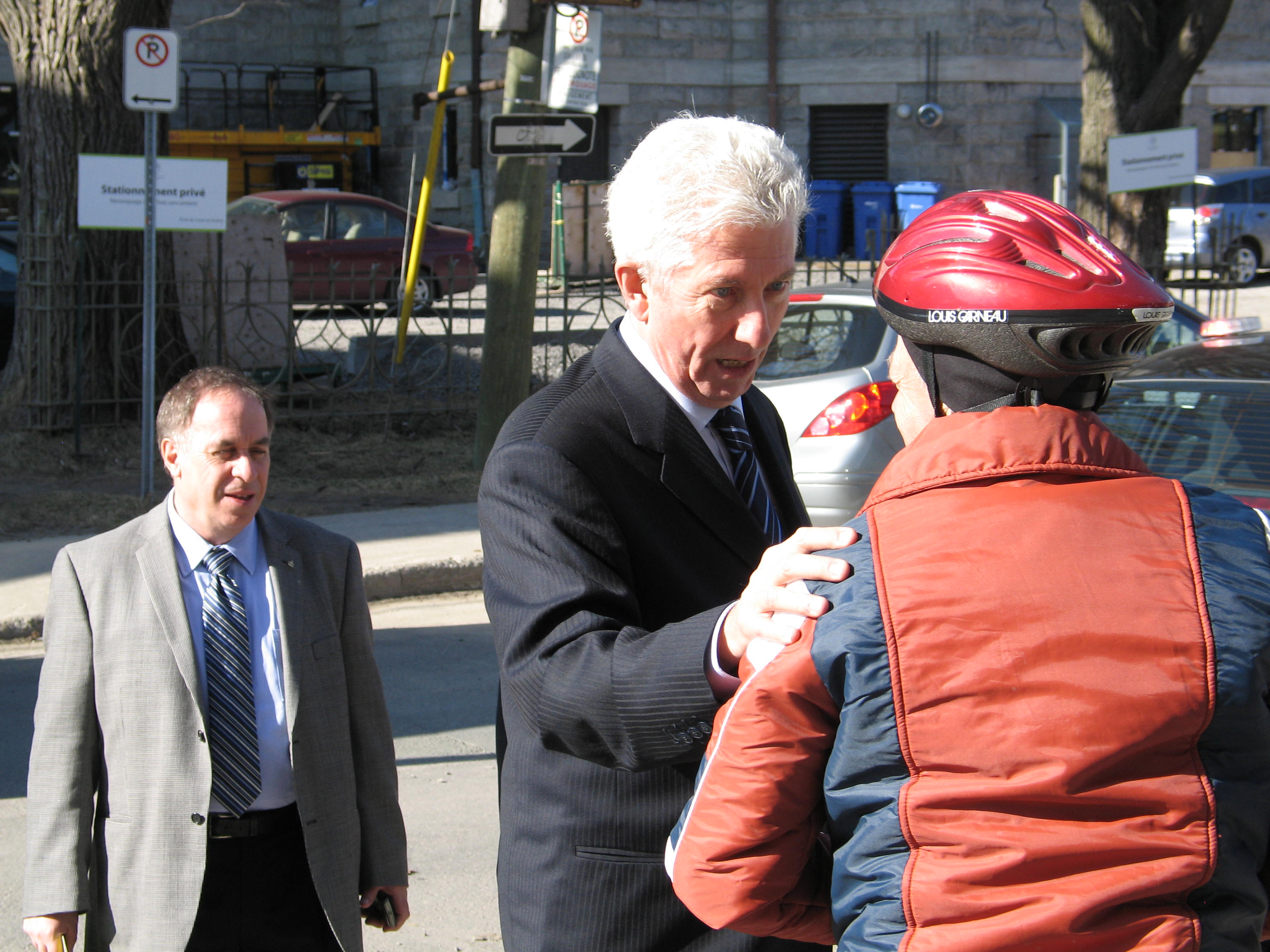
Gilles Duceppe discussing with a voter during the 2011 federal election campaign.

Duceppe's Bloc, along with the Stephen Harper's Conservatives and Jack Layton's NDP, worked together on November 28, 2005 to pass a motion of no confidence in the minority Liberal government of Prime Minister Paul Martin after findings in the Sponsorship Scandal. In the resultant 2006 federal election, many Bloc insiders believed that Duceppe's popularity, combined with the unpopularity of the federal Liberal Party in Quebec, would push the Bloc Québécois over the symbolic majority vote mark among Quebec voters. Many Quebec separatists felt that a strong performance by the Bloc in the 2006 federal election would boost the sovereignty movement and perhaps set the stage for a new referendum on secession after the anticipated Quebec provincial election expected in 2007. In actuality, a late surge in Conservative and federalist support kept the Bloc's share of the popular vote below 43% giving the Bloc only 51 seats. The Conservatives' gains in Quebec, as well as Ontario, gave the party enough seats to form a minority government with Harper as prime minister, replacing the Liberals' Paul Martin. The unimpressive and lackluster results on election night called into question the level of separatist support in Quebec.

In the March 26, 2007 Quebec provincial election, the Parti Québécois found itself reduced to third place in the National Assembly of Quebec, behind both the governing Quebec Liberal Party and the opposition Action démocratique du Québec. Following this disappointing result, the PQ leader, André Boisclair, announced his resignation on May 8, 2007. Duceppe confirmed on May 11, 2007, that he would seek the PQ leadership but the next day he withdrew from the race. After his withdrawal, Duceppe announced that he would support two-time leadership hopeful Pauline Marois.

=== 2008 federal election ===
In the 2008 federal election, Duceppe led the Bloc Québécois to 49 seats, up one from its pre-dissolution standing of 48. However, the Bloc's share of the popular vote fell again, to 38%, its lowest result since 1997. After the election, Liberals and NDP reached a deal form a minority coalition government with support from the Bloc Québécois, which would have toppled the minority Conservative government, however the Governor General agreed to prorogue parliament before the vote could take place. After prorogation, the Liberals underwent a change in leadership and distanced themselves from the coalition agreement and supported the Conservatives' budget. However Duceppe's Bloc and Jack Layton's NDP remained committed to voting against the Conservatives.

=== 2011 federal election and resignation ===
In 2011, the Bloc cooperated with the Liberals and NDP to find the Conservative government in contempt of Parliament, after all three opposition parties indicated that they would not accept the Conservatives' budget, leading Prime Minister Harper to request the dissolution of parliament. The Bloc demanded $5 billion for the province, including compensation for damages from the January 1998 North American ice storm and $175 million towards a new hockey arena to bring back the Quebec Nordiques, which the Conservatives dismissed outright.

In the resultant 2011 federal election, the Bloc lost 43 of their 47 seats—including many seats they'd held since their 1993 breakthrough—cutting them down to a rump of four MPs and losing official party status. Much of that support bled to the NDP, who ascended from fourth place to second place to become the Official Opposition, largely by winning 59 seats in Quebec which included a sweep of the Bloc's heartlands in Quebec City and eastern Montreal. The NDP, which entered the election with Outremont MP Tom Mulcair as their only elected representative in the province, had surged in the last weeks of the campaign at the expense of the Bloc due to NDP leader Jack Layton's charismatic personality and leftist nationalism policies, while Bloc "over the years defend[ed] Quebec's interests, but the sovereigntist agenda is no longer very relevant". Duceppe lost his own seat to NDP challenger Hélène Laverdière by 5,400 votes.

Accepting responsibility for the Bloc's crushing defeat, Duceppe announced his pending resignation as Bloc leader soon after the result was beyond doubt. He remained defiant, however, vowing not to rest "until Quebec becomes a country".

=== Spending allegations ===
In January 2012, Duceppe was accused of having used funds designated for his parliamentary office to pay the Bloc Québécois' general manager over a seven-year period. Duceppe denied any wrongdoing when testifying before the House of Commons Board of Internal Economy in February. In November 2012, the partisan House of Commons Board of Internal Economy found that Duceppe misused funds. However, the board could not take disciplinary action as the money was spent before the by-laws around the issue were changed.

== Retirement and brief return to politics ==
Duceppe has worked as a political analyst since his departure from parliament. In 2014, he denounced comments made by newly elected Bloc leader Mario Beaulieu in which he seemingly dismissed the Bloc under Duceppe as having followed a gradualist strategy for achieving sovereignty which Beaulieu characterised as defeatist and for invoking the phrase "nous vaincrons" (we will vanquish), which was a slogan employed by the paramilitary Front de libération du Québec.

After two years of further decline in the polls and internal divisions, it was announced June 10, 2015 that Duceppe would be returning to lead the Bloc into the campaign while his successor, Mario Beaulieu would relinquish the leadership but remain party president. The party executive agreed on June 9, 2015, to split the positions of president and party leader in order to facilitate Duceppe's return. The changes were ratified by the party's general council on July 1.

On August 1, 2015, it was reported that Duceppe had decided to contest his former riding of Laurier-Sainte-Marie in the upcoming federal election and that he would announce this in a press conference shortly after the election was called, which occurred on August 2. However, while leading his party to a win of 10 seats in the October 19, 2015 election, up from two, Duceppe was personally defeated in his riding and announced his resignation as leader several days later.

Duceppe's son Alexis Brunelle-Duceppe was elected to parliament in the 2019 federal election. In 2024, he commented on Trudeau saying Liberals "don't have another choice" for leader before the 45th Canadian federal election.

== Electoral record ==
Canadian federal by-election, August 13, 1990: Laurier—Sainte-Marie Death of Jean-Claude Malépart
Party	Candidate	Votes	%	±%
Independent	Gilles Duceppe	16,818	66.9	
Liberal	Denis Coderre	4,812	19.1	−19.9
New Democratic	Louise O'Neill	1,821	7.2	−14.4
Progressive Conservative	Christian Fortin	1,120	4.5	−25.2
Green	Michel Szabo	395	1.6	−1.9
Independent	Daniel Perreault	123	0.5	
Independent	Rejean Robidoux	42	0.2	
Total valid votes		25,131	100.0	

1993 Canadian federal election: Laurier—Sainte-Marie
Party	Candidate	Votes	%	±%	Expenditures
Bloc Québécois	Gilles Duceppe	25,060	61.79		$39,969
Liberal	Robert Desbiens	9,940	24.51	−14.56	$41,625
Progressive Conservative	Yvan Routhier	2,156	5.32	−24.34	$19,947
New Democratic	Alain Gravel	1,237	3.05	−18.57	$5,169
Green	John Tromp	1,050	2.59	−0.93	$1,304
Natural Law	Pierre Bergeron	652	1.61		$0
Marxist–Leninist	Normand Chouinard	205	0.51	+0.19	$80
Communist League	Michel Dugré	131	0.32		$507
Commonwealth of Canada	Sophie Brassard	127	0.31	+0.12	$0
Total valid votes		40,558	100.00		
Total rejected ballots		1,592			
Turnout		42,150	71.29	+1.96	
Electors on the lists		59,126			
Source: Thirty-fifth General Election, 1993: Official Voting Results, Published by the Chief Electoral Officer of Canada. Financial figures taken from the official contributions and expenses submitted by the candidates, provided by Elections Canada. Percentage change figures are made in relation to the 1988 general election, not the 1990 by-election.

1997 Canadian federal election: Laurier—Sainte-Marie
Party	Candidate	Votes	%	±%
Bloc Québécois	Gilles Duceppe	26,546	54.7	−7.0
Liberal	David Ly	11,154	23.0	−1.6
Progressive Conservative	Yanick Deschênes	5,808	12.0	+6.6
New Democratic	François Degardin	2,180	4.5	+1.4
Independent	François Gourd	1,255	2.6	
Green	Dylan Perceval-Maxwell	1,167	2.4	−0.2
Marxist–Leninist	Serge Lachapelle	338	0.7	+0.2
Independent	Mathieu Ravignat	123	0.3	
Total valid votes		48,571	100.0	

2000 Canadian federal election: Laurier—Sainte-Marie
Party	Candidate	Votes	%	±%
Bloc Québécois	Gilles Duceppe	23,473	52.8	−1.9
Liberal	Jean Philippe Côté	11,451	25.7	+2.8
Green	Dylan Perceval-Maxwell	2,169	4.9	+2.5
Marijuana	Marc-Boris St-Maurice	2,156	4.8	
New Democratic	Richard Chartier	2,121	4.8	+0.3
Progressive Conservative	Jean François Tessier	1,879	4.2	−7.7
Alliance	Stéphane Prud'homme	960	2.2	
Marxist–Leninist	Ginette Boutet	269	0.6	−0.1
Total valid votes		44,478	100.0	

2004 Canadian federal election: Laurier
Party	Candidate	Votes	%	±%	Expenditures
Bloc Québécois	Gilles Duceppe	28,728	60.1	+7.3	$69,284
Liberal	Jean-François Thibault	8,454	17.7	−8.1	$52,945
New Democratic	François Grégoire	5,779	12.1	+7.3	$5,400
Green	Dylan Perceval-Maxwell	2,912	6.1	+1.2	$2,801
Conservative	Pierre Albert	1,224	2.6	−3.8	$4,658
Marijuana	Nicky Tanguay	572	1.2	−3.7	
Marxist–Leninist	Ginette Boutet	154	0.3	−0.3	
Total valid votes/expense limit		47,823	100.0	$79,214	
Note: Conservative vote is compared to the total of the Canadian Alliance vote and Progressive Conservative vote in the 2000 election in the riding of Laurier—Sainte-Marie.

2006 Canadian federal election: Laurier—Sainte-Marie
Party	Candidate	Votes	%	±%	Expenditures
Bloc Québécois	Gilles Duceppe	26,773	54.69	−5.4	$74,181
New Democratic	François Grégoire	8,165	16.67	+4.6	$20,195
Liberal	Soeung Tang	6,095	12.45	−5.2	$12,436
Green	Dylan Perceval-Maxwell	4,064	8.30	+2.2	$2,265
Conservative	Carlos De Sousa	3,124	6.38	+3.8	$15,665
Marijuana	Nicky Tanguay	338	0.69	−0.5	
Independent	Jocelyne Leduc	157	0.32	*	
Marxist–Leninist	Ginette Boutet	137	0.27	−0.0	
Communist	Evelyn Elizabeth Ruiz	100	0.20	*	$926
Total valid votes/expense limit		48,953	100.00	$79,692	
Total rejected ballots		392	0.79		
Turnout		49,345	61.26		

2008 Canadian federal election: Laurier—Sainte-Marie
Party	Candidate	Votes	%	±%	Expenditures
Bloc Québécois	Gilles Duceppe	24,103	50.24	−4.45	$71,127
Liberal	Sébastien Caron	8,798	18.33	+5.88	$30,225
New Democratic	François Grégoire	8,209	17.11	+0.44	$31,151
Green	Dylan Perceval-Maxwell	3,801	7.92	−0.38	$7,171
Conservative	Charles K. Langford	2,320	4.83	−1.55	$5,590
Rhinoceros	François Yo Gourd	447	0.93		$388
Marxist–Leninist	Serge Lachapelle	118	0.24	−0.03	
Independent	Daniel "F4J" Laforest	93	0.19	–	
Communist	Samie Pagé-Quirion	86	0.17	−0.03	$898
Total valid votes/expense limit		47,975	100.00	$84,641	
Total rejected ballots		406	0.84		
Turnout		48,381	61.10		

2011 Canadian federal election: Laurier—Sainte-Marie
Party	Candidate	Votes	%	±%	Expenditures
New Democratic	Hélène Laverdière	23,373	46.64	+29.53	$22,982
Bloc Québécois	Gilles Duceppe	17,991	35.90	−14.34	$81,167
Liberal	Philippe Allard	4,976	9.93	−8.40	$16,728
Conservative	Charles K. Langford	1,764	3.52	−1.31	$4,611
Green	Olivier Adam	1,324	2.64	−5.28	$1,532
Rhinoceros	François Yo Gourd	398	0.79	−0.14	none listed
Communist	Sylvain Archambault	137	0.27	+0.10	$1,606
Marxist–Leninist	Serge Lachapelle	77	0.15	−0.09	none listed
Independent	Dimitri Mourkes	73	0.15		none listed
Total valid votes/expense limit		50,113	100.00		
Total rejected ballots		471	0.93		
Turnout		50,584	63.41		
Electors on the lists		79,772			
New Democratic gain from Bloc Québécois		Swing		+21.94%	
Source: Official Results, Elections Canada and Financial Returns, Elections Canada.

2015 Canadian federal election: Laurier—Sainte-Marie
Party	Candidate	Votes	%	±%	Expenditures
New Democratic	Hélène Laverdière	18,129	37.76%	-8.88	–
Bloc Québécois	Gilles Duceppe	13,565	28.25%	-7.65	–
Liberal	Christine Poirier	11,729	24.43%	+14.50	–
Conservative	Daniel Gaudreau	2,048	4.26%	+0.74	–
Green	Cyrille Giraud	1,673	3.48%	+0.84	–
Libertarian	Stéphane Beaulieu	541	1.13%	–	–
Independent	Julien Bernatchez	143	0.30%	+0.15	–
Marxist–Leninist	Serge Lachapelle	95	0.20%	+0.05	–
Communist	Pierre Fontaine	90	0.19%	-0.08	–
Total valid votes/Expense limit		–	100.0		$221,434.26
Total rejected ballots		–	–	–	
Turnout		48,013	57.34%	–	
Eligible voters		83,730			
Source: Elections Canada
