= Steven Guilbeault =

Canadian politician and environmentalist (born 1970)

The Honourable Steven Guilbeault PC
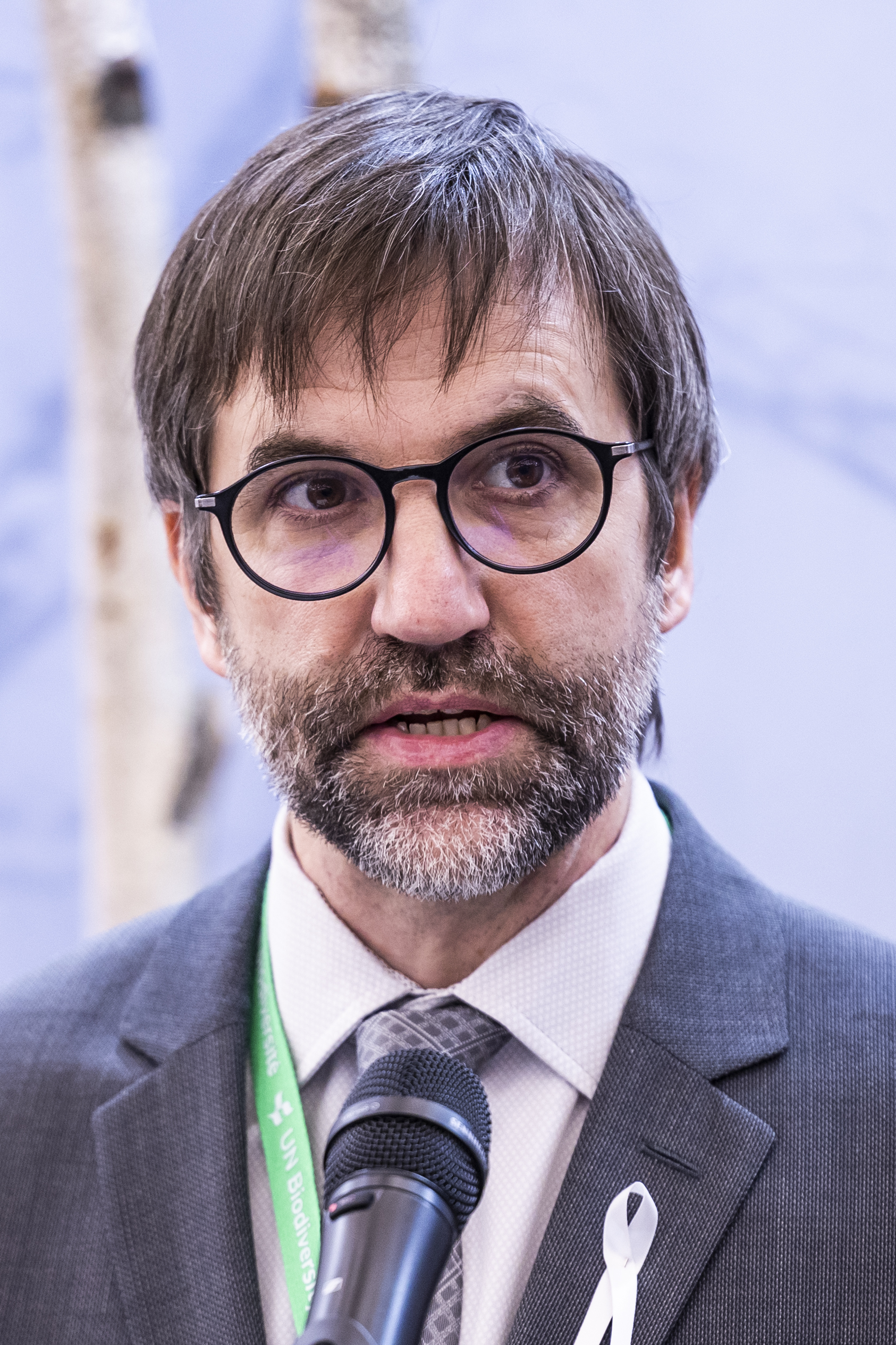
- Guilbeault in 2022

Minister of Canadian Identity and Culture (Note: Titled Minister of Canadian Culture and Identity, Parks Canada and Quebec Lieutenant from March 14, 2025 to May 13, 2025, and Minister of Canadian Heritage from November 20, 2019 to October 26, 2021)
- In office March 14, 2025 – November 27, 2025
- Prime Minister: Mark Carney
- Preceded by: Pascale St-Onge
- Succeeded by: Marc Miller
- In office November 20, 2019 – October 26, 2021
- Prime Minister: Justin Trudeau
- Preceded by: Pablo Rodríguez
- Succeeded by: Pablo Rodríguez

Minister responsible for Official Languages
- In office May 13, 2025 – November 27, 2025
- Prime Minister: Mark Carney
- Preceded by: Rachel Bendayan
- Succeeded by: Marc Miller

Minister of Environment and Climate Change
- In office October 26, 2021 – March 14, 2025
- Prime Minister: Justin Trudeau
- Preceded by: Jonathan Wilkinson
- Succeeded by: Terry Duguid

Member of Parliament for Laurier—Sainte-Marie
- In office October 21, 2019 – August 28, 2026
- Preceded by: Hélène Laverdière

Personal details
- Born: June 9, 1970 (age 56) La Tuque, Quebec, Canada
- Party: Liberal
- Education: Université de Montréal (BA)
- Occupation: Activist; consultant; politician

Steven Guilbeault PC (French: [gilbo]; born June 9, 1970) is a Canadian politician and activist who served as the member of Parliament (MP) for Laurier–Sainte-Marie from 2019 to 2026. A member of the Liberal Party, Guilbeault was Minister of Canadian Heritage from 2019 to 2021, Minister of Environment and Climate Change from 2021 to 2025, and Minister of Canadian Identity and Culture and Minister responsible for Official Languages.

A founding member of Équiterre, a Quebec community-supported agriculture organization, he was also director and campaign manager for the Greenpeace Quebec chapter for ten years. Guilbeault stepped down as senior director and spokesperson for Équiterre in November 2018, and announced his candidacy in the 2019 Canadian federal election in July. He resigned as a minister in the Carney ministry and as an MP due to the government's environmental policies.

== Early life and education ==
Guilbeault is of French Canadian descent although his maternal grandmother, Edna O'Farrell, was Irish Canadian. When he was five years old in his hometown of La Tuque in Haute-Mauricie, he refused to get down from a tree that he had climbed, in an effort to block a land developer from clearing a wooded area behind his home. The tree was felled a few days later, but the event is cited by Guilbeault as the genesis of his environmental activism.

After studying computer science in CEGEP (junior college), he enrolled in industrial relations at the Université de Montréal in 1989. A year later, he switched his major to political science. He minored in theology, exploring questions of international morality, liberation theology, poverty and the environment.

Guilbeault became president of his faculty's student association and also took part in activities organized by Equitas (known at the time as the Canadian Human Rights Foundation). He was also active in the Fédération étudiante universitaire du Québec (FEUQ), where he made the acquaintance of François Rebello and Nicolas Girard, who would later enter the world of politics. He also joined the Groupe de recherche en intérêt public (GRIP), created out of the protest movement spearheaded by Ralph Nader, the renowned American consumer advocate. There he met Laure Waridel, Sydney Ribaux and François Meloche, with whom he would go on to found Équiterre a few years later.

While in university, Guilbeault worked for two years (1992–1993) with the Canadian Human Rights Foundation, an organization dedicated to educating people, both at home and abroad, about human rights issues.

== Early career ==
After the Earth Summit in Rio de Janeiro in 1992, Guilbeault, Laure Waridel, Elizabeth Hunter, Patrick Henn, François Meloche and Sidney Ribaux founded Action for Solidarity, Equity, Environment and Development (ASEED). It acquired not-for-profit status in 1995. In 1998 it was rebranded as Équiterre. The organization's goal is to propose concrete solutions to make Canada a society where sustainable development and social economy would be central to the actions and concerns of its citizens, organizations and government. Steven Guilbeault was a member of Équiterre's board of directors for many years.

In 1997, Guilbeault joined Greenpeace Canada. He was put in charge of its climate change division and he managed the climate and energy campaign before being the organization's Quebec bureau chief in 2000. In 2005, he coordinated the climate campaign for Greenpeace International. On four occasions, Guilbeault made headlines for Greenpeace, such as when he scaled Toronto's CN Tower in 2001, accompanied by British activist Chris Holden. At the time the tower was the tallest in the world. After ascending to a height of 340 metres, they unfurled a banner that read: "Canada and Bush Climate Killers." Guilbeault and Holden were arrested and charged with mischief. The goal was to grab the world's attention a week before the UN's sixth conference on climate change, where the fate of the Kyoto Protocol would be decided. The stunt cost the CN Tower Corporation an estimated $50,000, and Guilbeault was sentenced to one year's probation and the court ordered him to pay a portion of costs. Guilbeault remained Greenpeace's Quebec spokesperson until June 8, 2007, at which time he announced his resignation.

In 2002, Gilbeault was arrested after climbing upon the house of Alberta Premier Ralph Klein. Gilbeault maintained that it was a stunt to pretend to install solar panels on the home, but Klein’s wife Colleen was terrified to see a nondescript van pull up and discharge men in orange jumpsuits who proceeded to climb onto the roof.

In 2008, he returned to Équiterre, which he had cofounded fifteen years earlier, to work on climate change issues. He left that position in autumn 2018.

=== Government work ===
Guilbeault sat on the board of the Agence de l'efficacité énergétique from 2007 to 2009 and chaired the Committee on Emerging Renewable Energy from 2009 to 2011 for the Government of Quebec. He also sat on the climate change advisory committees of three successive Quebec governments: Jean Charest’s Liberals, Pauline Marois’ Parti Québécois, and subsequently co-chairing the committee formed by Philippe Couillard’s Liberal government starting in 2014.

Stéphane Dion, a former federal Cabinet minister, remarked that Guilbeault "is among the select few in the environmental community with whom it is important to remain in contact, because his reactions and his opinions will count". Kalee Kreider, formerly with Greenpeace and former communications director for Al Gore, said that Steven Guilbeault "has at once gained the respect of those in government, NGOs and industry."

=== Other professional activities ===
Guilbeault has been a commentator for CBC/Radio-Canada, La Presse and Corporate Knights magazine, and has been a columnist for the Métro newspaper for nearly a decade. He worked as a senior consultant for Deloitte and Touche, and served as co-chair of Climate Action Network International for five years. He also chaired the Chamber of Commerce of Metropolitan Montreal's Committee on Sustainable Development from 2007 to 2010.

Since 2009, Guilbeault is listed as a founding member of Cycle Capital Management, and since has been a strategic consultant for the venture capital fund, which is dedicated to developing clean technologies.

== Political career ==
On June 19, 2019, Guilbeault announced that he was seeking the Liberal Party of Canada nomination for the riding of Laurier—Sainte-Marie in the 2019 Canadian federal election. On October 21, 2019, he was elected with 41.77 per cent of the vote, flipping a riding once held by New Democratic Party MP Hélène Laverdière.

=== Minister of Canadian Heritage (2019–2021) ===
On November 20, 2019, Guilbeault was named as the Trudeau government's minister of Canadian heritage, succeeding Pablo Rodríguez.

==== Bill C-10 (2021) ====
In 2021, Guilbeault introduced a bill (C-10) to amend 1991's Broadcasting Act, to modernize the legislation to include online broadcasting services. The proposed amendment faced round criticism in the media, with concerns that it could be used limit freedom of speech or expression on social media. Following calls by the New Democratic Party and Conservative opposition, the government introduced further amendments, clarifying that social media would not be regulated under the proposed legislation. Guilbeault has stated that users with a large social media presence could be considered "broadcasters," and thus be subject to government oversight and regulations.

=== Minister of Environment and Climate Change (2021–2025) ===
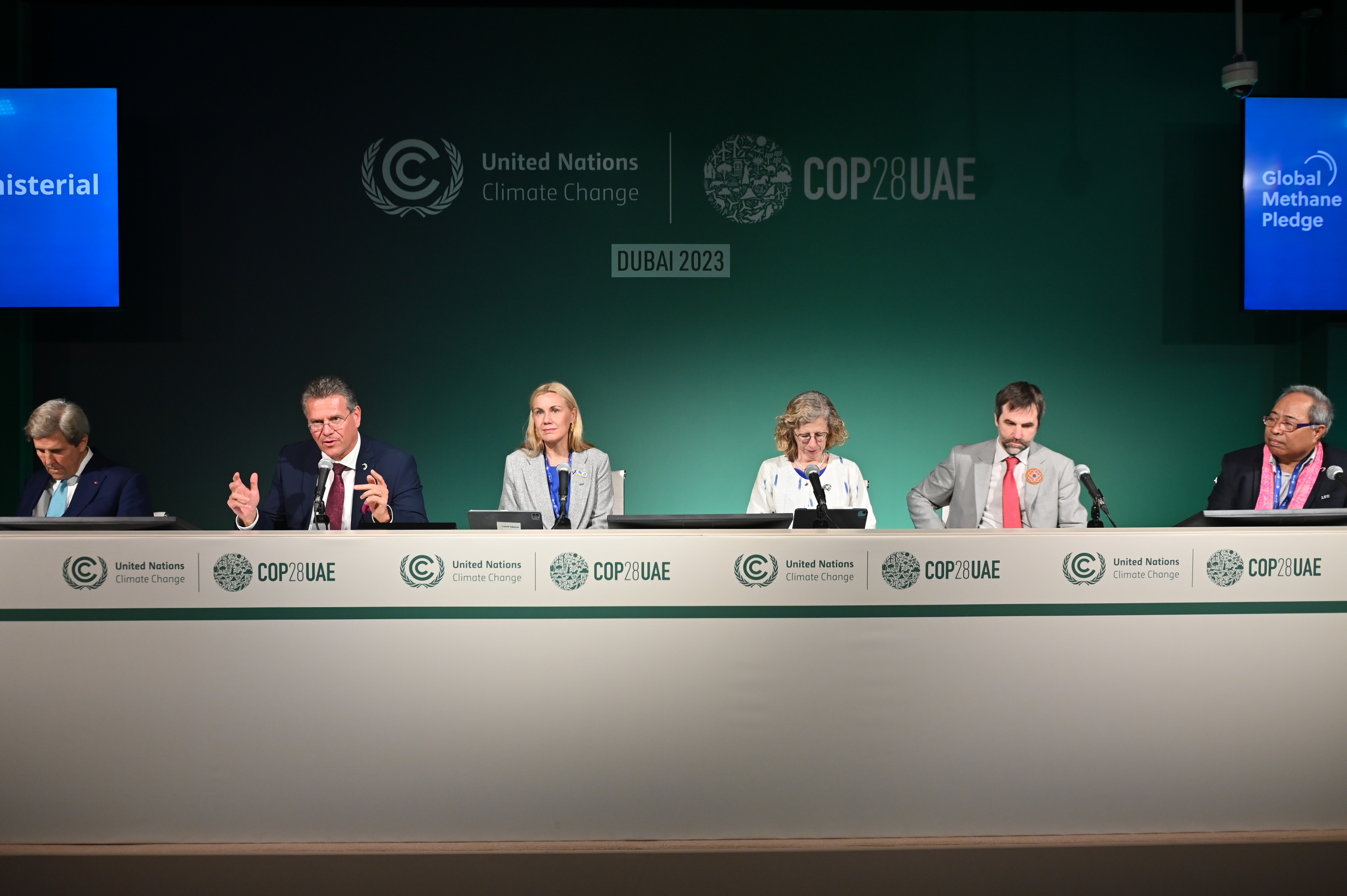
Guilbeault at the 2023 United Nations Climate Change Conference

Following the 2021 Canadian federal election, Guilbeault was named as the new environment minister for the 44th Canadian Parliament, taking office on October 26. His appointment drew heavy commentary, with his background as a former environmental activist attracting both praise and criticism.

In Alberta, Guilbeault faced shared criticism from both the governing United Conservative Party (UCP), and the opposition New Democratic Party (NDP). Premier Jason Kenney expressed hope that "he will send a signal that he is willing to work constructively and cooperatively with us, as partners, in reducing greenhouse gas emissions while growing the economy," and also stated that he was worried Guilbeault would impose a "radical agenda that would lead to mass unemployment." Provincial environment minister Jason Nixon echoed Kenney's concerns and called Guilbeault a "radical environmentalist". NDP leader Rachel Notley agreed with the government, adding "I share some of the concerns about some of the historical positions taken by (Guilbeault) in the past, some of his anti-pipeline commentary, that is certainly troubling".

In March 2022, Guilbeault issued the first Emissions Reduction Plan under the Canadian Net-Zero Emissions Accountability Act. Progress under the plan will be reviewed in progress reports produced in 2023, 2025, and 2027. Additional targets and plans will be developed for 2035 through to 2050. The 2030 Emissions Reduction Plan is Canada’s first detailed, comprehensive roadmap to reach the country’s emissions reduction target of 40 to 45 percent below 2005 levels by 2030.

In April 2022, Guilbeault was specifically targeted by NDP and environmental organizations with criticisms of his government's approval of an offshore oil project in the Bay du Nord property.

In August 2023, Guilbeault was troubled by speculation over his engagement on a Chinese Communist Party board. His rebuttal was an accusation that opposition partisans were "trying to mislead Canadians" over his involvement, while various Chinese media outlets warned him not to take a "condescending tone". In December 2023 it was reported that his two-day trip to China cost taxpayers $140,000. In May 2024 he was summoned to appear before a Parliamentary committee and testify about his activities.

=== Minister of Canadian Culture and Identity, Parks Canada and Quebec Lieutenant (2025) ===
On March 14, 2025, Guilbeault was named to the newly created position of Minister of Canadian Culture and Identity, Parks Canada as well as the Quebec lieutenant in Mark Carney's cabinet.

Guilbeault attracted controversy on July 1, 2025, after calling Harmonium lead vocalist and Quebec separatist Serge Fiori a "remarkable Canadian" following his death.

On November 27, 2025, following the signing of a memorandum of understanding between Carney and Alberta's government to build an oil pipeline from Alberta's oil sands to the British Columbia Coast, Guilbeault resigned as a Cabinet minister.

=== Backbench MP (2025–2026) ===
From November 27, 2025 Guilbeault sat as a Liberal backbench MP. Increasingly critical of the government's climate policies, Guilbeault announced on May 27, 2026 that he would be resigning his seat in parliament over the summer, saying "After almost seven years as Member of Parliament and Minister, I have come to the conclusion that it is time for me to pursue my fight for environmental protection and the fight against climate change in a different way.” He resigned his seat on August 28, 2026.

== Later career ==
Following his departure from federal politics, Guilbeault became an Executive Advisor for Climate, Biodiversity and Socioecological Transition at the Bâtirente and Fondaction Combination, an integrated Canadian labour-sponsored investment and retirement network.

== Honours ==
In 2009, Guilbeault became a member of the Cercle des Phénix de l’environnement du Québec. He is also an honorary fellow of the Royal Canadian Geographical Society. He was recognized as one of the 35 most influential figures in the past 35 years by the Fondation Marie-Vincent in 2010 and as an Americas Leader by the US magazine Americas Quarterly.

In 2012 Guilbeault received the Médaille de l’Université de Montréal. In 2014, he received the Blanche-Lemco-Van-Ginkel award from the Ordre des urbanistes du Québec for his significant contribution to urban planning in Quebec.

In 2016, Guilbeault received the Impératif français award recognizing his contribution to the vitality of the French language and French culture.

== Electoral record ==
2025 Canadian federal election: Laurier—Sainte-Marie
Party	Candidate	Votes	%	±%	Expenditures
Liberal	Steven Guilbeault	27,286	52.07	+12.57	$96,925.97
New Democratic	Nimâ Machouf	9,856	18.81	−11.62	$81,258.28
Bloc Québécois	Emmanuel Lapierre	8,079	15.42	−4.72	$37,025.22
Conservative	Mathieu Fournier	4,796	9.15	+4.66	$24.40
Green	Dylan Perceval-Maxwell	1,452	2.77	+0.54	$7,445.70
Marxist–Leninist	Michel Labelle	269	0.51	+0.35	$0.00
People's	Eugène Duplessis	253	0.48	−1.28	$971.89
Rhinoceros	Chantal Poulin	195	0.37	N/A	$0.00
Communist	Adrien Welsh	115	0.22	+0.03	$0.00
Independent	Simon-Pierre Lauzon	62	0.12	N/A	$245.00
Independent	Dimitri Mourkes	38	0.07	N/A	none listed
Total valid votes		52,401	98.86	+0.10	$128,761.60
Total rejected ballots		602	1.14	-0.10	
Turnout		53,003	64.02	+7.74	
Eligible voters		82,797			
Liberal notional hold		Swing		+12.09	
Source: Elections Canada

2021 Canadian federal election: Laurier—Sainte-Marie
Party	Candidate	Votes	%	±%	Expenditures
Liberal	Steven Guilbeault	16,961	37.96	−3.8	$106,932.30
New Democratic	Nimâ Machouf	14,680	32.86	+7.67	$74,683.45
Bloc Québécois	Marie-Ève-Lyne Michel	9,114	20.40	−2.42	$43,415.93
Conservative	Ronan Reich	1,500	3.36	+0.55	$5,774.18
Green	Jean-Michel Lavarenne	992	2.22	−3.82	$0.00
People's	Daniel Tanguay	758	1.70	+1.10	$1,926.49
Free	Julie Morin	233	0.52	—	$1.77
Animal Protection	Kimberly Lamontagne	199	0.42	—	$2,642.01
Communist	Adrien Welsh	95	0.21	+0.08	$0.00
Independent	Cyril Julien	74	0.17	—	$296.44
Marxist–Leninist	Serge Lachapelle	70	0.16	−0.02	$0.00
Total valid votes/expense limit		44,676	—	—	$110,467.65
Total rejected ballots		551			
Turnout		45,227	56.81		
Registered voters		79,607			
Source: Elections Canada

2019 Canadian federal election: Laurier—Sainte-Marie
Party	Candidate	Votes	%	±%	Expenditures
Liberal	Steven Guilbeault	22,306	41.77	+18.11	$84,747.37
New Democratic	Nimâ Machouf	13,453	25.19	−13.08	
Bloc Québécois	Michel Duchesne	12,188	22.82	−5.89	$25,536.85
Green	Jamil Azzaoui	3,225	6.04	+2.56	
Conservative	Lise des Greniers	1,504	2.82	−1.28	
People's	Christine Bui	320	0.6	—	
Rhinoceros	Archie Morals	208	0.39	—	
Marxist–Leninist	Serge Lachapelle	98	0.18	−0.01	
Communist	Adrien Welsh	67	0.13	−0.06	$867.96
Independent	Dimitri Mourkes	42	0.08	—	
Total valid votes/expense limit		53,409	100.0		
Total rejected ballots		551			
Turnout		53,960	65.4		
Eligible voters		82,524			
Liberal gain from New Democratic		Swing		+15.60	
Source: Elections Canada

== Selected publications ==
- Steven Guilbeault, Le bon, la brute et le truand - Ou comment l’intelligence artificielle transforme nos vies, Montréal, (Québec), Éditions Druide, 2019.
- Steven Guilbeault and François Tanguay, Le prochain virage, Montréal, (Québec), Canada, Éditions Druide, 2014, 304 pages.
- Steven Guilbeault, Alerte! : Le Québec à l'heure des changements climatiques, Montréal, (Québec), Canada, Éditions du Boréal, 2010, 248 pages.
- Steven Guilbeault and Jean-Guy Vaillancourt, Changements climatiques, protocole de Kyoto et le rôle des organisations non gouvernementales dans le cadre de ces grandes questions internationales, in Gendron Corinne and Jean-Guy Vaillancourt, Développement durable et participation démocratique : De la contestation écologiste aux défis de la gouvernance, Presses de l’Université de Montréal, Montréal, 2003.
- Steven Guilbeault and Jean-Guy Vaillancourt, Protocole de Kyoto : économie, politique et efficacité environnementale, in Actes de colloque Sociologie, économie et environnement, ACFAS, Québec, May 2002, pp. 223–239.
- Regroupement montréalais pour la qualité de l’air, Pollution atmosphérique et impacts sur la santé et l’environnement dans la grande région de Montréal, Chapitre 3: « Les effets néfastes de la pollution atmosphérique d’origine anthropique sur l’environnement de la grande région de Montréal », pp. 155–173, Éditeur Direction régionale de la santé publique, Montréal, 1998.

== Notes ==
30th Canadian Ministry (2025–present) – Cabinet of Mark Carney
Cabinet post (1)
Predecessor	Office	Successor
Pascale St-Onge	Minister of Canadian Identity and Culture; 2025–2025	Marc Miller
29th Canadian Ministry (2015–2025) – Cabinet of Justin Trudeau
Cabinet posts (2)
Predecessor	Office	Successor
Jonathan Wilkinson	Minister of Environment and Climate Change; 2021–2025	Terry Duguid
Pablo Rodríguez	Minister of Canadian Heritage; 2019–2021	Pablo Rodríguez
