= 34th Canadian Parliament =

1988-93 seating of the national legislature of the North American country

- Majority parliament
- Dec. 12, 1988 – Sep. 8, 1993

Parliament leaders
- Prime minister: Rt. Hon. Brian Mulroney; Sep. 17, 1984 – Jun. 25, 1993
- Rt. Hon. Kim Campbell; Jun. 25, 1993 – Nov. 4, 1993
- Cabinets: 24th Canadian Ministry; 25th Canadian Ministry
- Leader of the Opposition: Rt. Hon. John Turner; September 17, 1984 – February 7, 1990
- Hon. Herb Gray; February 8, 1990 – December 20, 1990
- Hon. Jean Chrétien; December 21, 1990 – October 24, 1993

Party caucuses
- Government: Progressive Conservative Party
- Opposition: Liberal Party
- Recognized: New Democratic Party

House of Commons
- Seating arrangements of the House of Commons
- Speaker of the Commons: Hon. John Allen Fraser; September 30, 1986 – January 16, 1994
- Government House leader: Hon. Don Mazankowski; June 30, 1986 – December 30, 1988
- Hon. Doug Lewis; April 3, 1989 – February 22, 1990
- Hon. Harvie Andre; February 23, 1990 – June 24, 1993
- Hon. Doug Lewis; June 25, 1993 – November 3, 1993
- Opposition House leader: Hon. Herb Gray; September 18, 1984 – February 7, 1990
- Hon. Jean-Robert Gauthier; February 7, 1990 – January 29, 1991
- Hon. David Charles Dingwall; January 30, 1991 – May 8, 1993
- Members: 295 MP seats List of members

Senate
- Seating arrangements of the Senate
- Speaker of the Senate: Hon. Guy Charbonneau; November 2, 1984 – December 6, 1993
- Government Senate leader: Hon. Lowell Murray; June 30, 1986 – November 3, 1993
- Opposition Senate leader: Hon. Allan MacEachen; September 16, 1984 – November 30, 1991
- Hon. Royce Herbert Frith; November 30, 1991 – October 25, 1993
- Senators: 104 senator seats List of senators

Sovereign
- Monarch: Elizabeth II; 6 February 1952 – 8 September 2022
- Governor general: Jeanne Sauvé; 14 May 1984 – 28 January 1990
- Ray Hnatyshyn; 29 January 1990 – 8 February 1995

Sessions
- 1st session December 12, 1988 – February 28, 1989
- 2nd session April 3, 1989 – May 12, 1991
- 3rd session May 13, 1991 – September 8, 1993
← 33rd	→ 35th

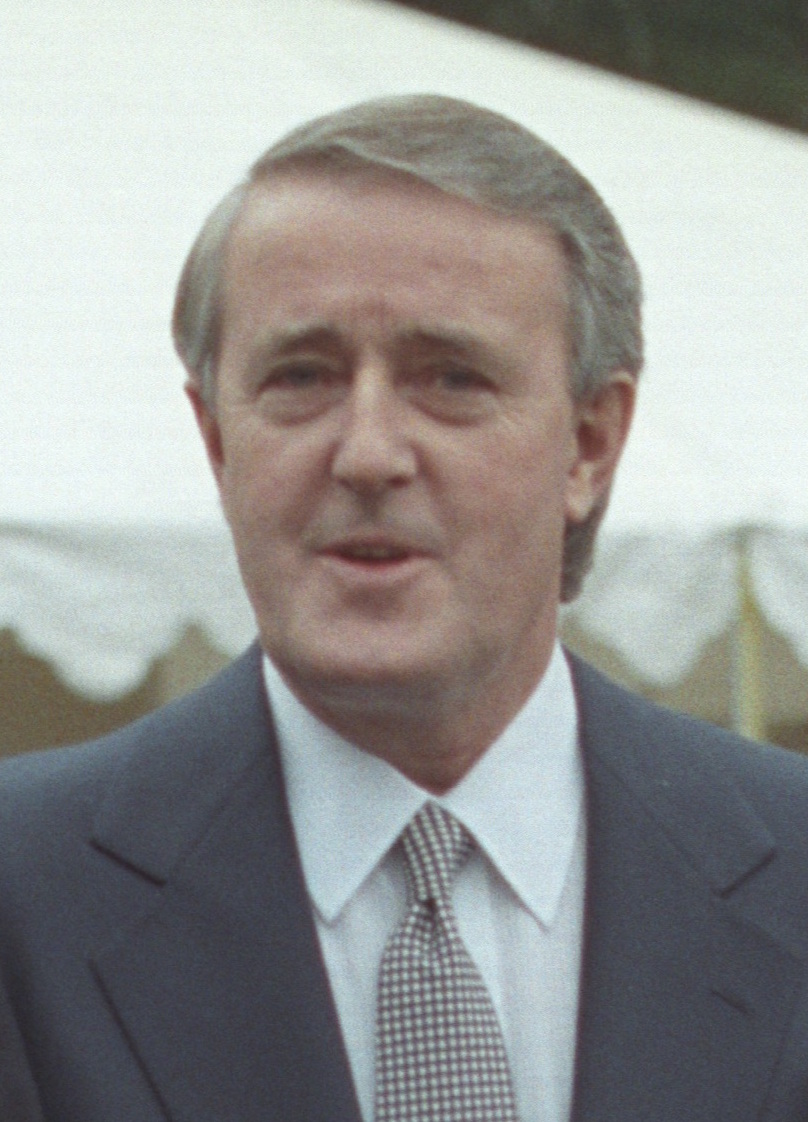
Brian Mulroney (pictured here in 1993) was Prime Minister during most of the 34th Canadian Parliament.

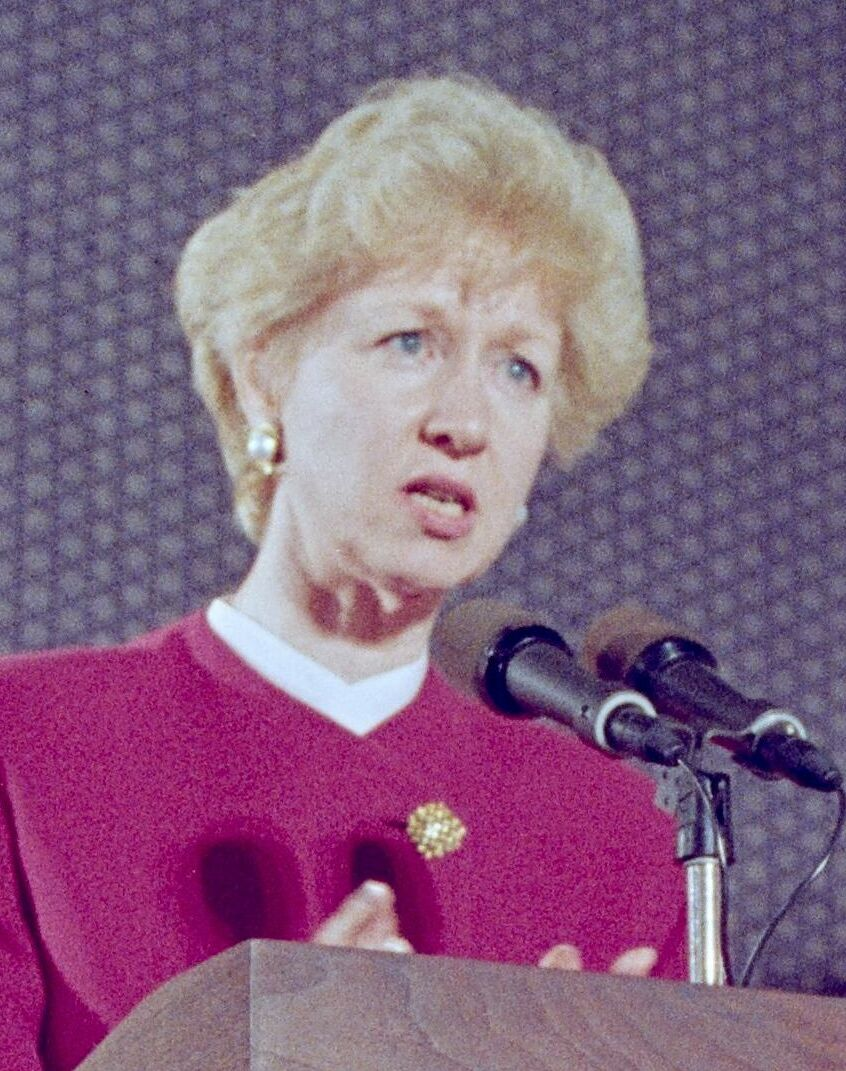
Kim Campbell (pictured here in 1993) was Prime Minister during the last months the 34th Canadian Parliament.

The 34th Canadian Parliament was in session from December 12, 1988, until September 8, 1993. The membership was set by the 1988 federal election on November 21, 1988, and it changed only somewhat due to resignations and by-elections until it was dissolved prior to the 1993 election.

There were three sessions of the 34th Parliament:

Session	Start	End
1st	December 12, 1988	February 28, 1989
2nd	April 3, 1989	May 12, 1991
3rd	May 13, 1991	September 8, 1993

== Overview ==
The 34th Canadian Parliament was controlled by a Progressive Conservative Party majority, led first by Prime Minister Brian Mulroney and the 24th Canadian Ministry, and then Prime Minister Kim Campbell and the 25th Canadian Ministry. The official opposition was the Liberal Party, led first by John Turner, and after 1990, by Jean Chrétien.

== Party standings ==
The party standings as of the election and as of dissolution were as follows:

Affiliation	House members		Senate members	
Affiliation	1988 election results	At dissolution	On election day 1988 (Note: Members of the Canadian Senate are appointed by the governor general on the advice of the prime minister and remain as senators until the age of 75, even if the House of Commons has been dissolved or an election has been called.)	At dissolution
Progressive Conservative	169	156	36	58
Liberal	83	81	57	41
New Democratic	43	44	0	0
Bloc Québécois	0	10	0	0
Reform	0	1	0	0**
Independent	0	3	5	5
Total members	295	295	98	104
Vacant	0	0	6	0
Total seats	295		104***	

* After dissolution but before turning over power to Kim Campbell, Brian Mulroney filled all Senate vacancies with Progressive Conservative members, for a total caucus of 58.
** There was one Reform senator in the middle of the 34th Parliament.
*** In the middle of the 34th Parliament, Brian Mulroney used a little-known clause in the constitution to fill the Senate above its normal seat limit by eight, to 112.

== Major events ==
=== Failure of the Meech Lake Accord ===
Beginning in the mid 80s, The Canadian government held a series of talks in hopes of convincing the province of Quebec to sign onto the Canadian Constitution. The government's proposal consisted of two major proposals. The first allowed for recognition of Quebec as a “distinct society" within Canada. The second gave additional powers to the provinces. It would allow them to opt out of federal programs if they had an equivalent program provincially and gave them some responsibilities for selecting members of the senate and supreme court.

Though the accord was initial popular, its support waned and eventually both Manitoba and Newfoundland failed to ratify it in their provincial legislatures. In Manitoba, MLA Elijah Harper, a member of the Cree Nation refused to give the necessary consent to bring the accord forward for debate. Harper cited Canada's failure to bring Aboriginal people into the country's political process as the source of his objection. Seeing that Manitoba had stalled in its ratification process, Newfoundland premiere Clyde Wells took the opportunity to discard the accord, which he had never liked.

=== Formation of the Bloc Québécois ===
After the failure of the Meech Lake Accord, MP Lucien Bouchard left the Progressive Conservative caucus to form his own party. Throughout 1990, he was joined by five Progressive Conservative MPs (Gilbert Chartrand, François Guérin, Nic Leblanc, Louis Plamondon and Benoît Tremblay) and two Liberal MP (Jean Lapierre, Gilles Rocheleau). Gilles Duceppe was elected to the party in a by-election in Laurier–Sainte-Marie on August 13th 1990. In total, the party had ten members at the dissolution of the 34th parliament.

=== Introduction of the GST ===
In the heat of an economic recession, the Mulroney Government introduced a national 7% Goods and Services Tax. This tax replaced a hidden 13.5% Manufacturers Sales Tax which was paid by manufacturers (who then passed the price on to the consumer) which the public had been largely unaware of. Though the tax rate was lower than the tax it replaced, it applied to a much wider selections of products and services.

Many opposed the tax, including Ontario NDP premiere Bob Rae who attempted to prevent it's implementation through both the senate and the first ministers' table. Despite his and others' efforts, bill C-62 passed the house and the senate and became law on December 14th, 1990.

== Ministry ==
The 24th Canadian Ministry was formed at the beginning of the 33rd Canadian Parliament and lasted for the majority of the 34th Canadian Parliament. The 25th Canadian Ministry was formed near the end of the 34th Canadian Parliament and lasted approximately 2 months.

== Officeholders ==
=== Head of State ===
Office	Photo	Name	Assumed office	Left office
Sovereign		Elizabeth II	February 6, 1952	September 8, 2022
Governor General		Jeanne Sauvé	May 14,1984	January 29, 1990
Governor General		Ray Hnatyshyn	January 29, 1990	February 8, 1995

=== Party leadership ===
Party	Photo	Name	Assumed Office	Left Office
Progressive Conservative		Brian Mulroney	June 11, 1983	June 13, 1993
Progressive Conservative		Kim Campbell	June 25, 1993	November 4, 1993
Liberal		John Turner	June 16, 1984	June 23, 1990
Liberal		Jean Chrétien	June 23, 1990	November 14, 2003
New Democratic		Ed Broadbent	July 7, 1975	December 5, 1989
New Democratic		Audrey McLaughlin	December 5, 1989	October 14, 1995
Bloc Québécois		Lucien Bouchard	July 25, 1990	January 16, 1996
Reform		Preston Manning	November 1, 1987	March 25, 2000

=== House of Commons ===
==== Presiding officer ====
Party	Photo	Name	Riding	Assumed Office	Left Office	Party
Speaker of the House of Commons		John Allen Fraser	Vancouver South	September 30, 1986	January 16, 1994	Progressive Conservative

==== Government leadership (Progressive Conservative) ====
Office	Photo	Officer	Riding	Assumed Office	Left Office
Prime Minister		Brian Mulroney	Manicouagan	September 17, 1984	June 25, 1993
Prime Minister		Kim Campbell	Vancouver Centre	June 25, 1993	November 4, 1993
House Leader		Don Mazankowski	Vegreville	June 30, 1986	April 3, 1989
House Leader		Doug Lewis (1st time)	Simcoe North	April 3, 1989	February 23, 1990
House Leader		Harvie Andre	Calgary Centre	February 23, 1990	June 25, 1993
House Leader		Doug Lewis (2nd time)	Simcoe North	June 25, 1993	November 4, 1993
Whip		Jim Hawkes	Calgary West	1988	1993
Whip		Jim Edwards	Edmonton Southwest	1993	1993

== Parliamentarians ==
=== House of Commons ===
Members of the House of Commons in the 34th parliament arranged by province.

Key:

- Party leaders are italicized.
- Parliamentary secretaries is indicated by "‡".
- Cabinet ministers are in **boldface**.
- The Prime Minister is **both**.
- The Speaker is indicated by "(†)".

==== Alberta ====
Riding	Member	Political party	First elected / previously elected	No. of terms
Athabasca	Jack Shields ‡	Progressive Conservative	1980	3rd term
Beaver River	John Dahmer (until November 1988)	Progressive Conservative	1988	1st term
Beaver River	Deborah Grey (from March 1989)÷	Reform	1989	1st term
Calgary Centre	**Harvie Andre**	Progressive Conservative	1972	6th term
Calgary North	Al Johnson	Progressive Conservative	1988	1st term
Calgary Northeast	Alex Kindy	Progressive Conservative	1984	2nd term
Calgary Northeast	Alex Kindy	Independent ¥	1984	2nd term
Calgary Southeast	Lee Richardson ‡	Progressive Conservative	1988	1st term
Calgary Southwest	**Bobbie Sparrow**	Progressive Conservative	1984	2nd term
Calgary West	Jim Hawkes ‡	Progressive Conservative	1979	4th term
Crowfoot	Arnold Malone	Progressive Conservative	1974	5th term
Edmonton East	Ross Harvey	New Democrat	1988	1st term
Edmonton North	Steve Paproski	Progressive Conservative	1968	7th term
Edmonton Northwest	Murray Dorin	Progressive Conservative	1984	2nd term
Edmonton Southeast	David Kilgour	Progressive Conservative	1979	4th term
Edmonton Southeast	David Kilgour	Independent	1979	4th term
Edmonton Southeast	David Kilgour	Liberal ≈	1979	4th term
Edmonton Southwest	**Jim Edwards** ‡	Progressive Conservative	1984	2nd term
Edmonton—Strathcona	Scott Thorkelson	Progressive Conservative	1988	1st term
Elk Island	Brian O'Kurley	Progressive Conservative	1988	1st term
Lethbridge	Blaine Thacker ‡	Progressive Conservative	1979	4th term
Macleod	Ken Hughes ‡	Progressive Conservative	1988	1st term
Medicine Hat	Robert Harold Porter	Progressive Conservative	1984	2nd term
Peace River	Albert Cooper ‡	Progressive Conservative	1980	3rd term
Red Deer	Douglas Fee	Progressive Conservative	1988	1st term
St. Albert	Walter van de Walle	Progressive Conservative	1986	2nd term
Vegreville	**Don Mazankowski**	Progressive Conservative	1968	7th term
Wetaskiwin	Willie Littlechild	Progressive Conservative	1988	1st term
Wild Rose	Louise Feltham	Progressive Conservative	1988	1st term
Yellowhead	**Joe Clark**	Progressive Conservative	1972	6th term

÷ John Dahmer died on November 26, 1988, after winning election but before being formally sworn in as a Member of Parliament. He was replaced by Deborah Grey in a 13 March 1989 by-election.
¥ Alex Kindy quit the Tory party on May 5, 1993, in protest over the GST. He sat as an independent for the remainder of the parliament.
≈ David Kilgour quit the Tory party on October 24, 1990, in protest over the GST. He later joined the Liberals. (In 2005, he left the Liberals to sit as an independent.)

==== British Columbia ====
Riding	Member	Political party	First elected / previously elected	No. of terms
Burnaby—Kingsway	Svend Robinson	New Democrat	1979	4th term
Capilano—Howe Sound	**Mary Collins**	Progressive Conservative	1984	2nd term
Cariboo—Chilcotin	Dave Worthy ‡	Progressive Conservative	1988	1st term
Comox—Alberni	Bob Skelly	New Democrat	1988	1st term
Delta	Stan Wilbee	Progressive Conservative	1988	1st term
Esquimalt—Juan de Fuca	Dave Barrett	New Democrat	1988	1st term
Fraser Valley East	Ross Belsher ‡	Progressive Conservative	1984	2nd term
Fraser Valley West	Robert Wenman	Progressive Conservative	1974	5th term
Kamloops	Nelson Riis	New Democrat	1980	3rd term
Kootenay East	Sid Parker	New Democrat	1980, 1988	2nd term*
Kootenay West—Revelstoke	Lyle Kristiansen	New Democrat	1980, 1988	2nd term*
Mission—Coquitlam	Joy Langan	New Democrat	1988	1st term
Nanaimo—Cowichan	David Stupich	New Democrat	1988	1st term
New Westminster—Burnaby	Dawn Black	New Democrat	1988	1st term
North Island—Powell River	Ray Skelly	New Democrat	1979	4th term
North Vancouver	Chuck Cook*	Progressive Conservative	1979	4th term
Okanagan Centre	Al Horning	Progressive Conservative	1988	1st term
Okanagan—Shuswap	Lyle MacWilliam	New Democrat	1988	1st term
Okanagan—Similkameen—Merritt	Jack Whittaker	New Democrat	1988	1st term
Port Moody—Coquitlam	Ian Waddell	New Democrat	1979	4th term
Prince George—Bulkley Valley	Brian Gardiner	New Democrat	1988	1st term
Prince George—Peace River	**Frank Oberle Sr.**	Progressive Conservative	1972	6th term
Richmond	**Tom Siddon**	Progressive Conservative	1978	5th term
Saanich—Gulf Islands	Lynn Hunter	New Democrat	1988	1st term
Skeena	James Fulton	New Democrat	1979	4th term
Surrey North	Jim Karpoff	New Democrat	1988	1st term
Surrey—White Rock	Benno Friesen ‡	Progressive Conservative	1974	5th term
Vancouver Centre	**Kim Campbell**	Progressive Conservative	1988	1st term
Vancouver East	Margaret Mitchell	New Democrat	1979	4th term
Vancouver Quadra	John Turner	Liberal	1962, (Note: St. Lawrence—St. George (Quebec)/Ottawa—Carleton (Ontario)) 1984	8th term*
Vancouver South	John Allen Fraser (†)	Progressive Conservative	1972	6th term
Victoria	John Brewin	New Democrat	1988	1st term

* Chuck Cook died in office on February 23, 1993 and the seat remains vacant for the reminder of parliament

==== Manitoba ====
Riding	Member	Political party	First elected / previously elected	No. of terms
Brandon—Souris	Lee Clark ‡	Progressive Conservative	1983	3rd term
Churchill	Rodney Murphy	New Democrat	1979	4th term
Dauphin—Swan River	Brian White	Progressive Conservative	1984	2nd term
Lisgar—Marquette	**Charles Mayer**	Progressive Conservative	1979	4th term
Portage—Interlake	Felix Holtmann	Progressive Conservative	1984	2nd term
Provencher	**Jake Epp**	Progressive Conservative	1972	6th term
Selkirk—Red River	David Bjornson	Progressive Conservative	1988	1st term
Saint Boniface	Ron Duhamel	Liberal	1988	1st term
Winnipeg North Centre	David Walker	Liberal	1988	1st term
Winnipeg North	Rey Pagtakhan	Liberal	1988	1st term
Winnipeg South	Dorothy Dobbie ‡	Progressive Conservative	1988	1st term
Winnipeg St. James	John Harvard	Liberal	1988	1st term
Winnipeg South Centre	Lloyd Axworthy	Liberal	1979	4th term
Winnipeg—Transcona	Bill Blaikie	New Democrat	1979	4th term

==== New Brunswick ====
Riding	Member	Political party	First elected / previously elected	No. of terms
Beauséjour	Fernand Robichaud (until September 1990)	Liberal	1984	2nd term
Beauséjour	Jean Chrétien (from December 1990)*	Liberal	1963, (Note: Saint-Maurice—Laflèche/Saint-Maurice (Quebec)) 1990	9th term*
Carleton—Charlotte	Greg Thompson	Progressive Conservative	1988	1st term
Fredericton	Bud Bird	Progressive Conservative	1988	1st term
Fundy—Royal	Robert Corbett	Progressive Conservative	1978	5th term
Gloucester	Doug Young	Liberal	1988	1st term
Madawaska—Victoria	**Bernard Valcourt**	Progressive Conservative	1984	2nd term
Miramichi	Maurice Dionne	Liberal	1974, 1988	4th term*
Moncton	George Rideout	Liberal	1988	1st term
Restigouche—Chaleur	Guy Arseneault	Liberal	1988	1st term
Saint John	**Gerald Merrithew**	Progressive Conservative	1984	1st term

* When Jean Chrétien was elected Liberal leader in 1990, Fernand Robichaud stepped aside 24 September 1990 to cause a by-election that would allow Chrétien to enter Parliament. Chrétien was elected in the December 10 by-election.

==== Newfoundland ====
Riding	Member	Political party	First elected / previously elected	No. of terms
Bonavista—Trinity—Conception	Fred Mifflin	Liberal	1988	1st term
Burin—St. George's	Roger Simmons	Liberal	1979, 1988	3rd term*
Gander—Grand-Falls	George Baker	Liberal	1974	5th term
Humber—St. Barbe—Baie Verte	Brian Tobin	Liberal	1980	3rd term
Labrador	Bill Rompkey	Liberal	1972	6th term
St. John's East	**Ross Reid** ‡	Progressive Conservative	1988	1st term
St. John's West	**John Crosbie**	Progressive Conservative	1976	5th term

==== Nova Scotia ====
Riding	Member	Political party	First elected / previously elected	No. of terms
Annapolis Valley—Hants	Pat Nowlan	Progressive Conservative	1965	8th term
Annapolis Valley—Hants	Pat Nowlan	Independent Conservative ¥	1965	8th term
Cape Breton Highlands—Canso	Francis LeBlanc	Liberal	1988	1st term
Cape Breton—East Richmond	David Dingwall	Liberal	1980	3rd term
Cape Breton—The Sydneys	Russell MacLellan	Liberal	1979	4th term
Central Nova	**Elmer MacKay**	Progressive Conservative	1971, 1984	7th term*
Cumberland—Colchester	Bill Casey	Progressive Conservative	1988	1st term
Dartmouth	Ron MacDonald	Liberal	1988	1st term
Halifax	Mary Clancy	Liberal	1988	1st term
Halifax West	Howard Crosby ‡	Progressive Conservative	1978	5th term
South Shore	**Peter McCreath** ‡	Progressive Conservative	1988	1st term
South West Nova	Coline Campbell	Liberal	1974, 1980, 1988	3rd term*

¥ Pat Nowlan quit the Tory party on October 24, 1990, to protest against the introduction of the Goods and Services Tax. He sat as an "Independent Conservative" for the remainder of the parliament.

==== Ontario ====
Riding	Member	Political party	First elected / previously elected	No. of terms
Algoma	Maurice Foster	Liberal	1968	7th term
Beaches—Woodbine	Neil Young	New Democrat	1980	3rd term
Brampton—Malton	Harry Chadwick	Progressive Conservative	1988	1st term
Brampton	**John McDermid**	Progressive Conservative	1979	4th term
Brant	Derek Blackburn	New Democrat	1971	7th term
Broadview—Greenwood	Dennis Mills	Liberal	1988	1st term
Bruce—Grey	Gus Mitges	Progressive Conservative	1972	6th term
Burlington	Bill Kempling ‡	Progressive Conservative	1972	6th term
Cambridge	Pat Sobeski	Progressive Conservative	1988	1st term
Carleton—Gloucester	Eugène Bellemare	Liberal	1988	1st term
Cochrane—Superior	Réginald Bélair	Liberal	1988	1st term
Davenport	Charles Caccia	Liberal	1968	7th term
Don Valley East	**Alan Redway**	Progressive Conservative	1984	2nd term
Don Valley North	Barbara Greene ‡	Progressive Conservative	1988	1st term
Don Valley West	John Bosley	Progressive Conservative	1979	4th term
Durham	K. Ross Stevenson	Progressive Conservative	1988	1st term
Eglinton—Lawrence	Joe Volpe	Liberal	1988	1st term
Elgin	Ken Monteith	Progressive Conservative	1988	1st term
Erie	Girve Fretz	Progressive Conservative	1979	4th term
Essex-Kent	Jerry Pickard	Liberal	1988	1st term
Essex-Windsor	Steven Langdon	New Democrat	1984	2nd term
Etobicoke Centre	**Michael Wilson**	Progressive Conservative	1979	4th term
Etobicoke North	Roy MacLaren	Liberal	1979, 1988	3rd term*
Etobicoke—Lakeshore	Patrick Boyer ‡	Progressive Conservative	1984	2nd term
Glengarry—Prescott—Russell	Don Boudria	Liberal	1984	2nd term
Guelph—Wellington	**William Winegard** ‡	Progressive Conservative	1984	2nd term
Haldimand—Norfolk	Bob Speller	Liberal	1988	1st term
Halton—Peel	**Garth Turner**	Progressive Conservative	1988	1st term
Hamilton East	Sheila Copps	Liberal	1984	2nd term
Hamilton Mountain	Beth Phinney	Liberal	1988	1st term
Hamilton—Wentworth	Geoffrey Scott	Progressive Conservative	1978	5th term
Hamilton West	Stan Keyes	Liberal	1988	1st term
Hastings—Frontenac—Lennox and Addington	Bill Vankoughnet	Progressive Conservative	1979	4th term
Huron—Bruce	Murray Cardiff ‡	Progressive Conservative	1980	3rd term
Kenora—Rainy River	Bob Nault	Liberal	1988	1st term
Kent	Rex Crawford	Liberal	1988	1st term
Kingston and the Islands	Peter Milliken	Liberal	1988	1st term
Kitchener	John Reimer	Progressive Conservative	1979, 1984	3rd term*
Lambton—Middlesex	Ralph Ferguson	Liberal	1980, 1988	2nd term*
Lanark—Carleton	**Paul Dick**	Progressive Conservative	1972	6th term
Leeds—Grenville	Jim Jordan	Liberal	1988	1st term
Lincoln	**Shirley Martin**	Progressive Conservative	1984	2nd term
London East	Joe Fontana	Liberal	1988	1st term
London—Middlesex	Terry Clifford	Progressive Conservative	1984	2nd term
London West	**Tom Hockin**	Progressive Conservative	1984	2nd term
Markham	Bill Attewell ‡	Progressive Conservative	1984	2nd term
Mississauga East	Albina Guarnieri	Liberal	1988	1st term
Mississauga South	Don Blenkarn	Progressive Conservative	1972, 1979	5th term*
Mississauga West	Robert Horner	Progressive Conservative	1984	2nd term
Nepean	Beryl Gaffney	Liberal	1988	1st term
Niagara Falls	**Rob Nicholson** ‡	Progressive Conservative	1984	2nd term
Nickel Belt	John Rodriguez	New Democrat	1972, 1984	5th term*
Nipissing	Bob Wood	Liberal	1988	1st term
Northumberland	Christine Stewart	Liberal	1988	1st term
Oakville—Milton	**Otto Jelinek**	Progressive Conservative	1972	6th term
Ontario	René Soetens	Progressive Conservative	1988	1st term
Oshawa	Ed Broadbent (until December 1989)	New Democrat	1968	7th term
Oshawa	Michael Breaugh (from October 1990)±	New Democrat	1990	1st term
Ottawa Centre	Mac Harb	Liberal	1988	1st term
Ottawa South	John Manley	Liberal	1988	1st term
Ottawa West	Marlene Catterall	Liberal	1988	1st term
Ottawa—Vanier	Jean-Robert Gauthier	Liberal	1972	6th term
Oxford	Bruce Halliday	Progressive Conservative	1974	5th term
Parkdale—High Park	Jesse Flis	Liberal	1979, 1988	3rd term*
Parry Sound-Muskoka	Stan Darling	Progressive Conservative	1972	6th term
Perth—Wellington—Waterloo	Harry Brightwell	Progressive Conservative	1984	2nd term
Peterborough	Bill Domm ‡	Progressive Conservative	1979	4th term
Prince Edward—Hastings	Lyle Vanclief	Liberal	1988	1st term
Renfrew	Len Hopkins	Liberal	1965	8th term
Rosedale	David MacDonald	Progressive Conservative	1965, (Note: Prince/Egmont (PEI)) 1988	6th term*
Sarnia—Lambton	Ken James ‡	Progressive Conservative	1984	2nd term
Sault Ste. Marie	Steve Butland	New Democrat	1988	1st term
Scarborough Centre	**Pauline Browes** ‡	Progressive Conservative	1984	2nd term
Scarborough East	Robert Hicks	Progressive Conservative	1984	2nd term
Scarborough West	Tom Wappel	Liberal	1988	1st term
Scarborough—Agincourt	Jim Karygiannis	Liberal	1988	1st term
Scarborough—Rouge River	Derek Lee	Liberal	1988	1st term
Simcoe Centre	Edna Anderson	Progressive Conservative	1988	1st term
Simcoe North	**Doug Lewis**	Progressive Conservative	1979	4th term
St. Catharines	Ken Atkinson	Progressive Conservative	1988	1st term
St. Paul's	**Barbara McDougall**	Progressive Conservative	1984	2nd term
Stormont—Dundas	Bob Kilger	Liberal	1988	1st term
Sudbury	Diane Marleau	Liberal	1988	1st term
Thunder Bay—Atikokan	Iain Angus	New Democrat	1984	2nd term
Thunder Bay—Nipigon	Joe Comuzzi	Liberal	1988	1st term
Timiskaming	John MacDougall ‡	Progressive Conservative	1982	3rd term
Timmins—Chapleau	Cid Samson	New Democrat	1988	1st term
Trinity—Spadina	Dan Heap	New Democrat	1981	3rd term
Victoria—Haliburton	William C. Scott ‡	Progressive Conservative	1965	8th term
Waterloo	Walter McLean	Progressive Conservative	1979	4th term
Welland—St. Catharines—Thorold	Gilbert Parent	Liberal	1974, (Note: St. Catharines/Welland) 1988	4th term*
Wellington—Grey—Dufferin—Simcoe	**Perrin Beatty**	Progressive Conservative	1972	6th term
Willowdale	Jim Peterson	Liberal	1980, 1988	2nd term*
Windsor West	Herb Gray	Liberal	1962	10th term
Windsor—Lake St. Clair	Howard McCurdy	New Democrat	1984	2nd term
York Centre	Bob Kaplan	Liberal	1968, (Note: Don Valley) 1974	6th term*
York North	Maurizio Bevilacqua	Liberal	1988	1st term
York South—Weston	John Nunziata	Liberal	1984	2nd term
York—Simcoe	John Cole	Progressive Conservative	1988	1st term
York West	Sergio Marchi	Liberal	1984	2nd term

± Ed Broadbent retired from politics and was replaced by Michael Breaugh on October 13, 1990, after a by-election.

==== Prince Edward Island ====
Riding	Member	Political party	First elected / previously elected	No. of terms
Cardigan	Lawrence MacAulay	Liberal	1988	1st term
Egmont	Joe McGuire	Liberal	1988	1st term
Hillsborough	George Proud	Liberal	1988	1st term
Malpeque	Catherine Callbeck	Liberal	1988	1st term

==== Quebec ====
Riding	Member	Political party	First elected / previously elected	No. of terms
Abitibi	Guy St-Julien	Progressive Conservative	1984	2nd term
Ahuntsic	Nicole Roy-Arcelin ‡	Progressive Conservative	1988	1st term
Anjou—Rivière-des-Prairies	**Jean Corbeil**	Progressive Conservative	1988	1st term
Argenteuil—Papineau	Lise Bourgault ‡	Progressive Conservative	1984	2nd term
Beauce	Gilles Bernier§	Progressive Conservative	1984	2nd term
Beauce	Gilles Bernier§	Independent	1984	2nd term
Beauharnois—Salaberry	Jean-Guy Hudon ‡	Progressive Conservative	1984	2nd term
Bellechasse	**Pierre Blais**	Progressive Conservative	1984	2nd term
Berthier—Montcalm	**Robert de Cotret**	Progressive Conservative	1978, (Note: Ottawa Centre (Ontario)) 1984	3rd term*
Blainville—Deux-Montagnes	**Monique Landry**	Progressive Conservative	1984	2nd term
Bonaventure—Îles-de-la-Madeleine	Darryl Gray	Progressive Conservative	1984	2nd term
Bourassa	Marie Gibeau	Progressive Conservative	1988	1st term
Brome—Missisquoi	Gabrielle Bertrand	Progressive Conservative	1984	2nd term
Chambly	Richard Grisé ‡	Progressive Conservative	1984	2nd term
Chambly	Phil Edmonston (from February 1990)‡	New Democrat	1990	1st term
Champlain	Michel Champagne ‡	Progressive Conservative	1984	2nd term
Charlesbourg	Monique Tardif ‡	Progressive Conservative	1984	2nd term
Charlevoix	**Brian Mulroney**	Progressive Conservative	1983	3rd term
Chateauguay	Ricardo Lopez	Progressive Conservative	1984	2nd term
Chicoutimi	André Harvey ‡	Progressive Conservative	1984	2nd term
Drummond	Jean-Guy Guilbault ‡	Progressive Conservative	1984	2nd term
Duvernay	Vincent Della Noce ‡	Progressive Conservative	1984	2nd term
Frontenac	**Marcel Masse**	Progressive Conservative	1984	2nd term
Gaspé	Charles-Eugène Marin	Progressive Conservative	1984	2nd term
Gatineau—La Lièvre	Mark Assad	Liberal	1988	1st term
Hochelaga—Maisonneuve	Allan Koury	Progressive Conservative	1988	1st term
Hull—Aylmer	Gilles Rocheleau	Liberal	1988	1st term
Hull—Aylmer	Gilles Rocheleau	Independent	1988	1st term
Hull—Aylmer	Gilles Rocheleau	Bloc Québécois †	1988	1st term
Joliette	Gaby Larrivée	Progressive Conservative	1988	1st term
Jonquiere	Jean-Pierre Blackburn ‡	Progressive Conservative	1984	2nd term
Kamouraska—Rivière-du-Loup	André Plourde ‡	Progressive Conservative	1984	2nd term
La Prairie	Fernand Jourdenais	Progressive Conservative	1984	2nd term
Lac-Saint-Jean	**Lucien Bouchard**	Progressive Conservative	1988	2nd term
Lac-Saint-Jean	**Lucien Bouchard**	Independent	1988	2nd term
Lac-Saint-Jean	**Lucien Bouchard**	Bloc Québécois †	1988	2nd term
Lachine—Lac-Saint-Louis	Robert Layton	Progressive Conservative	1984	2nd term
LaSalle—Émard	Paul Martin	Liberal	1988	1st term
Laurentides	Jacques Vien	Progressive Conservative	1988	1st term
Laurier—Sainte-Marie	Jean-Claude Malépart (until September 1989)	Liberal	1979	4th term
Laurier—Sainte-Marie	Gilles Duceppe (from 1990)Ø	Independent	1990	1st term
Laurier—Sainte-Marie	Gilles Duceppe (from 1990)Ø	Bloc Québécois	1990	1st term
Laval	Guy Ricard	Progressive Conservative	1984	2nd term
Laval-des-Rapides	Jacques Tétreault	Progressive Conservative	1988	1st term
Lévis	Gabriel Fontaine	Progressive Conservative	1984	2nd term
Langelier	**Gilles Loiselle**	Progressive Conservative	1988	1st term
Longueuil	Nic Leblanc	Progressive Conservative	1984	2nd term
Longueuil	Nic Leblanc	Independent	1984	2nd term
Longueuil	Nic Leblanc	Bloc Québécois †	1984	2nd term
Lotbiniere	Maurice Tremblay	Progressive Conservative	1984	2nd term
Louis-Hébert	Suzanne Duplessis ‡	Progressive Conservative	1984	2nd term
Manicouagan	Charles Langlois ‡	Progressive Conservative	1988	1st term
Matapédia—Matane	Jean-Luc Joncas	Progressive Conservative	1984	2nd term
Mégantic—Compton—Stanstead	François Gérin	Progressive Conservative	1984	2nd term
Mégantic—Compton—Stanstead	François Gérin	Independent	1984	2nd term
Mégantic—Compton—Stanstead	François Gérin	Bloc Québécois †	1984	2nd term
Mercier	Carole Jacques	Progressive Conservative	1984	2nd term
Montmorency—Orléans	Charles Deblois	Progressive Conservative	1988	1st term
Mount Royal	Sheila Finestone	Liberal	1984	2nd term
Notre-Dame-de-Grâce	Warren Allmand	Liberal	1965	8th term
Outremont	Jean-Pierre Hogue	Progressive Conservative	1988	1st term
Papineau—Saint-Michel	André Ouellet	Liberal	1967	8th term
Pierrefonds—Dollard	**Gerry Weiner**	Progressive Conservative	1984	2nd term
Pontiac—Gatineau—Labelle	Barry Moore ‡	Progressive Conservative	1984	2nd term
Portneuf	Marc Ferland	Progressive Conservative	1984	2nd term
Quebec East	Marcel Tremblay ‡	Progressive Conservative	1984	2nd term
Richelieu	Louis Plamondon	Progressive Conservative	1984	2nd term
Richelieu	Louis Plamondon	Independent	1984	2nd term
Richelieu	Louis Plamondon	Bloc Québécois †	1984	2nd term
Richmond—Wolfe	Yvon Côté	Progressive Conservative	1988	1st term
Rimouski—Témiscouata	**Monique Vézina**	Progressive Conservative	1984	2nd term
Roberval	**Benoît Bouchard**	Progressive Conservative	1984	2nd term
Rosemont	Benoît Tremblay ‡	Progressive Conservative	1988	1st term
Rosemont	Benoît Tremblay ‡	Independent	1988	1st term
Rosemont	Benoît Tremblay ‡	Bloc Québécois †	1988	1st term
Saint-Denis	Marcel Prud'homme	Liberal	1964	9th term
Saint-Henri—Westmount	David Berger	Liberal	1979	4th term
Saint-Hubert	Pierrette Venne	Progressive Conservative	1988	1st term
Saint-Hubert	Pierrette Venne	Bloc Québécois †	1988	1st term
Saint-Hyacinthe—Bagot	Andrée Champagne	Progressive Conservative	1984	2nd term
Saint-Jean	Clément Couture	Progressive Conservative	1988	1st term
Saint-Laurent	Shirley Maheu	Liberal	1988	1st term
Saint-Léonard	Alfonso Gagliano	Liberal	1984	2nd term
Saint-Maurice	Denis PronovostΔ	Progressive Conservative	1988	1st term
Saint-Maurice	Denis PronovostΔ	Independent	1988	1st term
Shefford	Jean Lapierre₴	Liberal	1979	4th term
Shefford	Jean Lapierre₴	Independent	1979	4th term
Shefford	Jean Lapierre₴	Bloc Québécois †	1979	4th term
Sherbrooke	**Jean Charest**	Progressive Conservative	1984	2nd term
Témiscamingue	Gabriel Desjardins	Progressive Conservative	1984	2nd term
Terrebonne	Jean-Marc Robitaille ‡	Progressive Conservative	1988	1st term
Trois-Rivières	**Pierre H. Vincent** ‡	Progressive Conservative	1984	2nd term
Vaudreuil	**Pierre Cadieux**	Progressive Conservative	1984	2nd term
Vercheres	**Marcel Danis**	Progressive Conservative	1984	2nd term
Verdun—Saint-Paul	Gilbert Chartrand	Progressive Conservative	1984	2nd term
Verdun—Saint-Paul	Gilbert Chartrand	Independent	1984	2nd term
Verdun—Saint-Paul	Gilbert Chartrand	Bloc Québécois †	1984	2nd term
Verdun—Saint-Paul	Gilbert Chartrand	Progressive Conservative	1984	2nd term

§ Just before the 1993 election, Gilles Bernier left the Tories to sit as an independent
† On May 5, 1990, seven Conservative and two Liberal MPs, led by Lucien Bouchard, left their parties to form the Bloc Québécois
‡ Richard Grisé left Parliament after being sentenced to jail for corruption. He was replaced by Philip Edmonston in a February 12, 1990 by-election.
Ø Jean-Claude Malépart died in office on September 16, 1989. The next year he was replaced by Gilles Duceppe in a by-election.
Δ On June 17, 1993, Denis Pronovost left the PC party to sit as an independent following conviction on criminal charges.
₴ On August 23, 1992 Jean Lapierre resigned from parliament and the seat remains vacant for the reminder of parliament

==== Saskatchewan ====
Riding	Member	Political party	First elected / previously elected	No. of terms
Kindersley—Lloydminster	**Bill McKnight**	Progressive Conservative	1979	4th term
Mackenzie	Vic Althouse	New Democrat	1980	3rd term
Moose Jaw—Lake Centre	Rod Laporte	New Democrat	1988	1st term
Prince Albert—Churchill River	Ray Funk	New Democrat	1988	1st term
Regina—Lumsden	Les Benjamin	New Democrat	1968	7th term
Regina—Qu'Appelle	Simon De Jong	New Democrat	1979	4th term
Regina—Wascana	**Larry Schneider**	Progressive Conservative	1988	1st term
Saskatoon—Clark's Crossing	Chris Axworthy	New Democrat	1988	1st term
Saskatoon—Dundurn	Ron Fisher	New Democrat	1988	1st term
Saskatoon—Humboldt	Stan Hovdebo	New Democrat	1979	4th term
Souris—Moose Mountain	Lenard Gustafson ‡	Progressive Conservative	1979	4th term
Swift Current—Maple Creek—Assiniboia	Geoff Wilson	Progressive Conservative	1984	2nd term
The Battlefords—Meadow Lake	Len Taylor	New Democrat	1988	1st term
Yorkton—Melville	Lorne Nystrom	New Democrat	1968	7th term

==== Territories ====
Riding	Member	Political party	First elected / previously elected	No. of terms
Western Arctic	Ethel Blondin-Andrew	Liberal	1988	1st term
Nunatsiaq	Jack Anawak	Liberal	1988	1st term
Yukon	Audrey McLaughlin	New Democrat	1987	2nd term

== Committees ==
=== House ===
==== Standing ====
- Standing Committee on Aboriginal Affairs
- Standing Committee on Agriculture
  - Sub-Committee on G.S.T. Agricultural Exemptions
- Standing Committee on Communications and Culture
  - Sub-Committee on Bill C-62 (Telecommunications)
  - Sub-Committee on Violence on Television
  - Sub-Committee on the National Arts Centre
  - Sub-Committee on the Status of the Artist
- Standing Committee on Communications, Culture, Citizenship and Multiculturalism
  - Sub-Committee on Citizenship and Multiculturalism
- Standing Committee on Consumer and Corporate Affairs and Government Operations
- Standing Committee on Elections, Privileges, Procedure and Private Members’ Business
- Standing Committee on Energy, Mines and Resources
- Standing Committee on Environment
  - Sub-Committee on Acid Rain
- Standing Committee on External Affairs and International Trade
  - Sub-Committee on Arms Export
  - Sub-Committee on Development and Human Rights
  - Sub-Committee on International Trade
  - Sub-Committee on International Debt
  - Sub-Committee on Norad
- Standing Committee on Finance
  - Sub-Committee on the Bank of Canada
  - Sub-Committee on Expenditure Priorities
  - Sub-Committee on Financial Institutions Legislation
  - Sub-Committee on International Financial Institutions
  - Sub-Committee on Regulations and Competitiveness
  - Sub-Committee on Tax Matters
- Standing Committee on Forestry and Fisheries
  - Sub-Committee on Fisheries
  - Sub-Committee on Forestry
- Standing Committee on Health and Welfare, Social Affairs, Seniors and the Status of Women
  - Sub-Committee on Fitness and Amateur Sport
  - Sub-Committee on Health Issues
  - Sub-Committee on Poverty
  - Sub-Committee on Senior Citizens Health Issues
  - Sub-Committee on the Status of Women
- Standing Committee on House Management
  - Sub-Committee on Private Members’ Business
- Standing Committee on Human Rights and the Status of Disabled Persons
  - Sub-Committee on International Human Rights
- Standing Committee on Industry, Science and Technology, Regional and Northern Development
- Standing Committee on Justice and the Solicitor General
  - Sub-Committee on National Security
  - Sub-Committee on the Recodification of the General Part of the Criminal Code
- Standing Committee on Labour, Employment and Immigration
  - Sub-Committee on Immigration
  - Sub-Committee on Labour and Employment
- Standing Committee on Multiculturalism and Citizenship
- Standing Committee on National Defence and Veterans Affairs
- Standing Committee on Official Languages
- Standing Committee on Privileges and Elections
- Standing Committee on Public Accounts
- Standing Committee on Transport
  - Sub-Committee on the St. Lawrence Seaway

==== Legislative ====
- Legislative Committee A on Bill C-202 (national day of remembrance and action on violence against women)
- Legislative Committee B on Bill C-39 (Canada Pension Plan amendments)
- Legislative Committee B on Bill C-51 (water resources – Northwest Territories and Yukon)
- Legislative Committee C on Bill C-13 (federal environmental assessment process)
- Legislative Committee C on Bill C-2 (National Energy Board Act)
- Legislative Committee C on Bill C-42 (protection of wild animals and plants)
- Legislative Committee D on Bill C-41 (energy efficiency)
- Legislative Committee D on Bill C-58 (Oil and Gas Production and Conservation Act)
- Legislative Committee E on Bill C-38 (Telesat Canada)
- Legislative Committee E on Bill C-45 (transportation of dangerous goods)
- Legislative Committee E on Bill C-53 (special economic measures)
- Legislative Committee E on Bill C-6 (weapons control)
- Legislative Committee E on Bill C-61 (borrowing authority 1992)
- Legislative Committee F on Bill C-10 (Excise Tax Act amendments)
- Legislative Committee F on Bill C-3 (real property – Government of Canada)
- Legislative Committee F on Bill C-9 (laundering of proceeds of crime)
- Legislative Committee F on Bill S-2 (double taxation conventions – Finland, Czech and Slovak Federal Republic, Mexico)
- Legislative Committee G on Bill C-55 (pensions legislation)
- Legislative Committee H on Bill C-17 (Criminal Code and Customs Tariff)
- Legislative Committee H on Bill C-203 (Criminal Code – terminally ill persons)
- Legislative Committee H on Bill C-26 (Public Service Employment Act amendments)
- Legislative Committee H on Bill C-328 (national week of the Public Service)
- Legislative Committee H on Bill C-40 (postal services)
- Legislative Committee on Bill C-10 (official development assistance loans)
- Legislative Committee on Bill C-101 (Canada Labour Code and Public Service Staff Relations Act)
- Legislative Committee on Bill C-102 (Customs Tariff and related Acts)
- Legislative Committee on Bill C-106 (petroleum-related Acts – Canadian ownership)
- Legislative Committee on Bill C-109 (Criminal Code, Crown Liability and Radiocommunication Act)
- Legislative Committee on Bill C-11 (borrowing authority)
- Legislative Committee on Bill C-110 (Northumberland Strait Crossing)
- Legislative Committee on Bill C-112 (Excise Tax Act and related Acts)
- Legislative Committee on Bill C-113 (government expenditure restraint)
- Legislative Committee on Bill C-115 (North American Free Trade Agreement)
- Legislative Committee on Bill C-118 (Export Development Act)
- Legislative Committee on Bill C-12 (museums)
- Legislative Committee on Bill C-121 (Canada Shipping Act)
- Legislative Committee on Bill C-122 (Customs Tariff – textile tariff reduction)
- Legislative Committee on Bill C-124 (Currency Act)
- Legislative Committee on Bill C-126 (Criminal Code and Young Offenders Act)
- Legislative Committee on Bill C-13 (divestiture of Nordion and Theratronics)
- Legislative Committee on Bill C-15 (plant breeders’ rights)
- Legislative Committee on Bill C-16 (Canadian Space Agency)
- Legislative Committee on Bill C-17 (Customs Tariff)
- Legislative Committee on Bill C-18 (Department of Multiculturalism and Citizenship)
- Legislative Committee on Bill C-19 (Canadian Exploration and Development Incentive Program Act)
- Legislative Committee on Bill C-20 (Excise Tax Act and Excise Act)
- Legislative Committee on Bill C-21 (Unemployment Insurance Act amendments)
- Legislative Committee on Bill C-223 (Day of Mourning for Persons Killed or Injured in the Workplace)
- Legislative Committee on Bill C-227 (Criminal Code – desecration of the flag)
- Legislative Committee on Bill C-23 (National Energy Board Act)
- Legislative Committee on Bill C-25 (Geneva Conventions Act and related Acts)
- Legislative Committee on Bill C-258 (Centennial Flame Research Award)
- Legislative Committee on Bill C-26 (Railway Act – grain and flour subsidies)
- Legislative Committee on Bill C-260 (Canada Pension Plan – Spousal Agreement)
- Legislative Committee on Bill C-28 (Income Tax Act and related Acts)
- Legislative Committee on Bill C-289 (Remembrance Day – Public Service collective agreements)
- Legislative Committee on Bill C-29 (Department of Forestry)
- Legislative Committee on Bill C-3 (Department of Industry, Science and Technology)
- Legislative Committee on Bill C-301 (Financial Administration Act – financial information)
- Legislative Committee on Bill C-305 (Victoria Cross)
- Legislative Committee on Bill C-327 (employee shareholding)
- Legislative Committee on Bill C-34 (Canadian Centre for Management Development)
- Legislative Committee on Bill C-36 (Advance Payments for Crops Act amendments)
- Legislative Committee on Bill C-37 (Canadian Heritage Languages Institute)
- Legislative Committee on Bill C-38 (Federal Court Act and related Acts)
- Legislative Committee on Bill C-39 (offshore areas application of laws)
- Legislative Committee on Bill C-40 (broadcasting and radiocommunication)
- Legislative Committee on Bill C-43 (An Act respecting abortion)
- Legislative Committee on Bill C-44 (Hibernia Development Project)
- Legislative Committee on Bill C-46 (contraventions of federal enactments)
- Legislative Committee on Bill C-48 (Crop Insurance Act)
- Legislative Committee on Bill C-49 (Criminal Code – sexual assault)
- Legislative Committee on Bill C-49 (resumption of government services)
- Legislative Committee on Bill C-5 (Railway Act)
- Legislative Committee on Bill C-51 (Income Tax Act)
- Legislative Committee on Bill C-53 (Criminal Code – arson)
- Legislative Committee on Bill C-54 (Criminal Code – joinder of counts)
- Legislative Committee on Bill C-55 (Customs Act)
- Legislative Committee on Bill C-56 (Small Business Loans Act)
- Legislative Committee on Bill C-57 (Integrated Circuit Topographies)
- Legislative Committee on Bill C-58 (Young Offenders Act and Criminal Code)
- Legislative Committee on Bill C-59 (National Parks Act)
- Legislative Committee on Bill C-59 (reconstitution of courts – British Columbia)
- Legislative Committee on Bill C-6 (Radio Act)
- Legislative Committee on Bill C-60 (reconstitution of courts – Ontario)
- Legislative Committee on Bill C-61 (Divorce Act – barriers to religious remarriage)
- Legislative Committee on Bill C-63 (Canadian Race Relations Foundation)
- Legislative Committee on Bill C-63 (dissolution of corporations and bodies)
- Legislative Committee on Bill C-65 (borrowing authority)
- Legislative Committee on Bill C-66 and Bill C-67 (animals and plant protection)
- Legislative Committee on Bill C-68 (Yukon mining Acts)
- Legislative Committee on Bill C-70 (Criminal Code – jury)
- Legislative Committee on Bill C-72 (Canadian Polar Commission)
- Legislative Committee on Bill C-72 (National Round Table on the Environment and the Economy)
- Legislative Committee on Bill C-73 (Canada Post Corporation Act)
- Legislative Committee on Bill C-73 (Crown corporations dissolution/transfer)
- Legislative Committee on Bill C-74 (Fisheries Act)
- Legislative Committee on Bill C-76 (budget implementation 1992)
- Legislative Committee on Bill C-79 (Divorce Act and Family Orders Enforcement)
- Legislative Committee on Bill C-8 (Department of Labour Act)
- Legislative Committee on Bill C-81 (referendums on the Constitution of Canada)
- Legislative Committee on Bill C-81 (United Nations Convention on Contracts for the International Sale of Goods)
- Legislative Committee on Bill C-82 (Port Warden Acts)
- Legislative Committee on Bill C-84 (privatization of national petroleum company)
- Legislative Committee on Bill C-85 (control of psychoactive substances)
- Legislative Committee on Bill C-85 (official languages, pensions and labour relations – airports)
- Legislative Committee on Bill C-88 (Copyright Act)
- Legislative Committee on Bill C-88 (European Bank for Reconstruction and Development)
- Legislative Committee on Bill C-89 (Investment Canada Act)
- Legislative Committee on Bill C-90 (Criminal Code – sentencing)
- Legislative Committee on Bill C-91 (Financial Administration Act)
- Legislative Committee on Bill C-91 (Patent Act)
- Legislative Committee on Bill C-93 (Bretton Woods and Related Agreements Act)
- Legislative Committee on Bill C-95 (Farm Credit Corporation)
- Legislative Committee on Bill C-98 (additional borrowing authority 1992)
- Legislative Committee on Bill C-99 (Small Business Loans Act)
- Legislative Committee on Bill S-10 (Canadian Institute of Chartered Accountants)
- Legislative Committee on Bill S-14 (marriage between related persons)
- Legislative Committee on Bill S-17 (Copyright and related Acts)
- Legislative Committee on Bill S-2 (double taxation conventions)
- Legislative Committee on Bill S-5 (Safeguard Life Assurance Company)
- Legislative Committee on Bill S-9 (Salvation Army amalgamation)

==== Parliamentary ====
- Parliamentary Ad Hoc Committee on AIDS
- Parliamentary Forum Global Climate Change

==== Special ====
- Special Committee on Canada–United States Air Transport Services
- Special Committee on Electoral Reform
- Special Committee on Subject Matter of Bill C-80 (Firearms)
- Special Committee on the Act Respecting Customs
- Special Committee on the Review of the CSIS Act and the Security Offences Act
- Special Committee on the Review of the Employment Equity Act
- Special Committee on the Review of the Parliament of Canada Act
- Special Committee to pre-study Bill C-78 (Federal Environmental Assessment Process)
- Special Committee to Study the Proposed Companion Resolution to the Meech Lake Accord

=== Senate ===
==== Standing ====
- Standing Committee on Aboriginal Peoples
- Standing Committee on Agriculture and Forestry
- Standing Committee on Banking, Trade and Commerce
- Standing Committee on Energy
- Standing Committee on Energy the Environment and Natural Resources
- Standing Committee on Fisheries
- Standing Committee on Foreign Affairs
  - Subcommittee on Security and National Defence
- Standing Committee on Internal Economy, Budgets and Administration
- Standing Committee on Legal and Constitutional Affairs
- Standing Committee on National Finance
- Standing Committee on Social Affairs, Science and Technology
  - Subcommittee on Veterans Affairs
- Standing Committee on Standing Rules and Orders
- Standing Committee on Transport and Communications

==== Special ====
- Committee of Selection

=== Joint ===
==== Standing Joint Committees ====
- Standing Joint Committee for the Scrutiny of Regulations
- Standing Joint Committee on Official Languages

==== Special Joint Committees ====
- Aboriginal Liaison Committee of the Special Joint Committee on a Renewed Canada
- Special Joint Committee on a Renewed Canada
- Special Joint Committee on Bill C-116 (Conflict of Interests)
- Special Joint Committee on Conflict of Interests
- Special Joint Committee on Process for Amending the Constitution of Canada

== Changes to party standings ==
=== By-elections ===
By-election	Date	Incumbent	Party	Winner	Party	Cause	Retained
Beauséjour	December 10, 1990	Fernand Robichaud	Liberal	Jean Chrétien	Liberal	Resignation to provide a seat for Chrétien	Yes
York North	December 10, 1990	Maurizio Bevilacqua	Liberal	Maurizio Bevilacqua	Liberal	Election declared void	Yes
Oshawa	August 13, 1990	Ed Broadbent	New Democratic	Mike Breaugh	New Democratic	Resignation	Yes
Laurier—Sainte-Marie	August 13, 1990	Jean-Claude Malépart	Liberal	Gilles Duceppe	Independent	Death	No
Chambly	February 12, 1990	Richard Grisé	Progressive Conservative	Phil Edmonston	New Democratic	Resignation	No
Beaver River	March 13, 1989	John Dahmer	Progressive Conservative	Deborah Grey	Reform	Death (cancer)	No

=== Deaths ===
Name	Date	Electoral district	Party
John Dahmer	November 26, 1988	Beaver River	Progressive Conservative
Jean-Cuade Malépart	November 16, 1989	Laurier-Saint-Marie	Liberal
Chuck Cook	February 24, 1993	North Vancouver	Progressive Conservative

=== Resignations ===
Name	Date	Electoral district	Party
Richard Grisé	May 30, 1989	Chambly	Independent
Edward Broadbent	December 31, 1989	Oshawa	New Democratic Party
Ferdinand Robichaud	September 24, 1990	Beauséjour	Liberal
Derek N. Blackburn	May 31, 1993	Brant	New Democratic Party
Benoit Bouchard	June 17, 1993	Roberval	Progressive Conservative
Catherine Callbeck	January 25, 1993	Malpeque	Liberal
Albert Cooper	September 8, 1993	Peace River	Progressive Conservative
Robert R. de Cotret	June 16, 1993	Berthier-Montcalm	Progressive Conservative
Arthur Jacob Epp	September 1, 1993	Provencher	Progressive Conservative
Leonard Gustafson	May 26, 1993	Souris-Moose Mountain	Progressive Conservative
Jean Lapierre	August 23, 1992	Shefford	Bloc Québécois
Marcel Prud'homme	May 26, 1993	Saint-Denis	Liberal

=== Floor-crossings ===
Name	Date	Electoral district	Original Party	New Party
Pat Nowlan	November 21, 1990	Annapolis Valley-Hants	Progressive Conservative	Independent
Gilles Rocheleau	July 3, 1990	Hull-Aylmer	Liberal	Independent
Gilles Rocheleau	December 20, 1990	Hull-Aylmer	Independent	Bloc Québécois
Lucien Bouchard	May 22, 1990	Lac-Saint-Jean	Progressive Conservative	Independent
Lucien Bouchard	December 20, 1990	Lac-Saint-Jean	Independent	Bloc Québécois
Gilbert Chartrand	May 22, 1990	Verduin-Saint-Paul	Progressive Conservative	Independent
Gilbert Chartrand	December 20, 1990	Verduin-Saint-Paul	Independent	Bloc Québécois
Gilbert Chartrand	April 9, 1991	Verduin-Saint-Paul	Bloc Québécois	Progressive Conservative
François Gérin	May 18, 1990	Mégantic-Compton-Stanstead	Progressive Conservative	Independent
François Gérin	September 26, 1991	Mégantic-Compton-Stanstead	Independent	Bloc Québécois
Nic Leblanc	June 26, 1990	Longueil	Progressive Conservative	Independent
Nic Leblanc	December 20, 1990	Longueil	Independent	Bloc Québécois
Louis Plamondon	June 26, 1990	Richelieu	Progressive Conservative	Independent
Louis Plamondon	December 20, 1990	Richelieu	Independent	Bloc Québécois
Benoît Tremblay	June 26, 1990	Rosemont	Progressive Conservative	Independent
Benoît Tremblay	December 20, 1990	Rosemont	Independent	Bloc Québécois
Jean Lapierre	June 26, 1990	Shefford	Liberal	Independent
Jean Lapierre	December 20, 1990	Shefford	Independent	Bloc Québécois
Gilles Duceppe	December 19, 1990	Laurier-Saint-Marie	Independent	Bloc Québécois
Richard Grisé	April 18, 1989	Chambly	Progressive Conservative	Independent
David Kilgour	October 25, 1990	Edmonton Southeast	Progressive Conservative	Independent
David Kilgour	January 31, 1991	Edmonton Southeast	Independent	Liberal
Alex Kindy	May 5, 1993	Calgary Northeast	Progressive Conservative	Independent
Denis Pronovost	June 17, 1993	Saint-Maurice	Progressive Conservative	Independent
Pierrette Venne	August 12, 1991	Sant-Hubert	Progressive Conservative	Bloc Québécois

=== Other ===
Name	Date	Electoral district	Party	Reason
Michael O'Brien	-	York North	Progressive Conservative	Unseated due to Ontario Supreme Court judicial recount
Maurizi Bevilacqua	September 24, 1990	York North	Liberal	Election invalidated by judgment of the Supreme Court of Ontario (later re-elected)

== Legislation and motions ==
=== Act's which received royal assent under 34th Parliament ===
==== 1st Session ====
===== Public acts (1988) =====
Date of Assent	Index	Title	Bill Number
December 30, 1988	65	Canada-United States Free Trade Agreement Implementation Act	C-2

==== 2nd Session ====
===== Public acts (1989) =====
Date of Assent	Index	Title	Bill Number
May 17, 1989	1	Appropriation Act No. 1, 1989-90	C-14
June 29, 1989	2	Criminal Code (pari-mutuel betting), An Act to amend the	C-7
June 29, 1989	3	Canadian Transportation Accident Investigation and Safety Board Act	C-2
June 29, 1989	4	Borrowing Authority Act, 1989-90	C-11
June 29, 1989	5	Department of Labour Act, An Act to amend the	C-8
June 29, 1989	6	Statute Law (Superannuation) Amendment Act	C-24
June 29, 1989	7	Non-smokers' Health Act, An Act to amend the	C-27
June 29, 1989	8	Judges Act, An Act to amend the	C-30
June 29, 1989	9	Canadian Environmental Protection Act, An Act to amend the	C-22
June 29, 1989	10	Saint-Laurent, An Act to change the name of the electoral district of	C-239
June 29, 1989	11	Markham, An Act to change the name of the electoral district of	C-240
June 29, 1989	12	Fredericton, An Act to change the name of the electoral district of	C-241
June 29, 1989	13	Renfrew, An Act to change the name of the electoral district of	C-245
June 29, 1989	14	Restigouche, An Act to change the name of the electoral district of	C-252
June 29, 1989	15	Windsor–Lake St. Clair, An Act to change the name of the electoral district of	C-254
June 29, 1989	16	Appropriation Act No. 2, 1989-90	C-35
October 4, 1989	17	Radio Act and certain other Acts in consequence thereof	C-6
October 4, 1989	18	Customs Tariff, An Act to amend the	C-17
October 4, 1989	19	Canadian Exploration and Development Incentive Program Act	C-19
November 7, 1989	20	Canada–Luxembourg Income Tax Convention	S-2
November 7, 1989	21	Appropriation Act No. 3, 1989-90	C-42
December 12, 1989	22	Excise Tax Act and the Excise Act, An Act to amend the	C-20
December 12, 1989	23	Appropriation Act No. 4, 1989-90	C-50
December 15, 1989	24	Government Services Resumption Act	C-49
December 15, 1989	25	Forgiveness of Debts (sub-Saharan Africa) Act	C-10
December 15, 1989	26	Advance Payments for Crops Act and the Prairie Grain Advance Payments Act, An Act to amend the	C-36
December 21, 1989	27	Department of Forestry Act	C-29
December 21, 1989	28	Canada Elections Act, An Act to amend the	C-47

===== Local and private acts (1989) =====
Date of Assent	Index	Title	Bill Number
November 7, 1989	29	Safeguard Life Assurance Company, An Act to authorize continuance	S-5

===== Public acts (1990) =====
Date of Assent	Index	Title	Bill Number
January 30, 1990	1	Department of Industry, Science and Technology Act	C-3
January 30, 1990	2	Energy Supplies Emergency Act and to amend the Access to Information Act in consequence thereof, An Act to amend the	C-4
January 30, 1990	3	Museums Act	C-12
January 30, 1990	4	Nordion and Theratronics Divestiture Authorization Act	C-13
January 30, 1990	5	Governor General's Act, An Act to amend the	C-31
March 29, 1990	6	Railway Act, An Act to amend the	C-5
March 29, 1990	7	National Energy Board Act and to repeal certain enactments in consequence thereof, An Act to amend the	C-23
March 29, 1990	8	Federal Court Act, the Crown Liabilities Act, the Supreme Court Act and other Acts in consequence thereof, An Act to amend the	C-38
March 29, 1990	9	Crop Insurance Act, An Act to amend the	C-48
March 29, 1990	10	Small Businesses Loans Act, An Act to amend the	C-56
March 29, 1990	11	Appropriation Act No. 5, 1989-90	C-70
March 29, 1990	12	Appropriation Act No. 1, 1990-91	C-71
May 10, 1990	13	Canadian Space Agency Act	C-16
June 12, 1990	14	Geneva Conventions Act, the National Defence Act and the Trade-marks Act, An Act to amend the	C-25
June 12, 1990	15	Criminal Code (arson), An Act to amend the	C-53
June 12, 1990	16	British Columbia Courts Amendment Act	C-59
June 12, 1990	17	Ontario Courts Amendment Act, 1989	C-60
June 12, 1990	18	Divorce Act (barriers to religious remarriages), An Act to amend the	C-61
June 12, 1990	19	Borrowing Authority Act, 1990-91	C-65
June 19, 1990	20	Plant Breeders' Rights Act	C-15
June 19, 1990	21	Health of Animals Act	C-66
June 19, 1990	22	Plant Protection Act	C-67
June 19, 1990	23	Brampton-Malton, An Act to change the name of the electoral district of	C-294
June 19, 1990	24	Montmorency-Orléans, An Act to change the name of the electoral district of	C-296
June 19, 1990	25	Elgin, An Act to change the name of the electoral district of	C-298
June 19, 1990	26	Selkirk, An Act to change the name of the electoral district of	C-308
June 19, 1990	27	Surrey-White Rock, An Act to change the name of the electoral district of	C-309
June 19, 1990	28	Laval, An Act to change the name of the electoral district of	C-310
June 19, 1990	29	Laval-des-Rapides, An Act to change the name of the electoral district of	C-311
June 19, 1990	30	Gloucester, An Act to change the name of the electoral district of	C-305
June 19, 1990	31	Langelier, An Act to change the name of the electoral district of	C-307
June 19, 1990	32	Duvernay, An Act to change the name of the electoral district of	C-312
June 19, 1990	33	Appropriation Act No. 2, 1990-91	C-75
June 27, 1990	34	Income Tax Act, An Act to amend the	C-51
June 27, 1990	35	Income Tax Act and related Acts, An Act to amend the	C-52
June 27, 1990	36	Customs Act, An Act to amend the	C-55
June 27, 1990	37	Integrated Circuit Topography Act	C-57
June 27, 1990	38	Immigration Act, An Act to amend the	C-77
October 23, 1990	39	Income Tax Act, the Federal-Provincial Fiscal Arrangements and Federal Post-Secondary Education and Health Contributions Act, the Old Age Security Act, the Public Utilities Income Tax Transfer Act, the War Veterans Allowance Act and a related Act, An Act to amend the	C-28
October 23, 1990	40	Unemployment Insurance Act and the Employment and Immigration Department and Commission Act, An Act to amend the	C-21
November 6, 1990	41	Hibernia Development Project Act	C-44
November 8, 1990	42	Income Tax Act (child tax credit), An Act to amend the	C-86
December 17, 1990	43	War veterans, An Act to amend the statute law in relation to	C-87
December 17, 1990	44	Canadian Laws Offshore Application Act	C-39
December 17, 1990	45	Excise Tax Act, the Criminal Code, the Customs Act, the Customs Tariff, the Excise Act, the Income Tax Act, the Statistics Act and the Tax Court of Canada Act	C-62
December 17, 1990	46	Marriage (Prohibited Degrees) Act	S-14
December 21, 1990	47	Bank Act (extension), An Act to amend the	C-90
December 21, 1990	48	Northwest Territories Act, An Act to amend the	C-92

===== Local and private acts (1990) =====
Date of Assent	Index	Title	Bill Number
March 29, 1990	49	Salvation Army Act, 1989	S-9
May 10, 1990	50	Eastern Synod of the Evangelical Lutheran Church in Canada Act	S-11
May 10, 1990	51	Ukrainian Greek Orthodox Church of Canada, An Act to amend An Act to incorporate the	S-13
June 12, 1990	52	Canadian Institute of Chartered Accountants, An Act respecting the	S-10
June 12, 1990	53	Desjardins Mutual Life Assurance Company, An Act to amend the Act of incorporation of	S-15
June 19, 1990	54	Canadian Institute of Mining and Metallurgy, An Act to amend the Act of incorporation of The	S-16

===== Public acts (1991) =====
Date of Assent	Index	Title	Bill Number
January 17, 1991	1	Fisheries Act and to amend the Criminal Code in consequence thereof, An Act to amend the	C-74
January 17, 1991	2	Yukon Placer Mining Act and the Yukon Quartz Mining Act and to make provision for the application of certain orders, An Act to amend the	C-68
January 17, 1991	3	Department of Multiculturalism and Citizenship and to amend certain Acts in relation thereto, An Act to establish the	C-18
January 17, 1991	4	Criminal Code (joinder of counts), An Act to amend the	C-54
January 17, 1991	5	Appropriation Act No. 3, 1990-91	C-94
February 1, 1991	6	Canadian Polar Commission Act	C-72
February 1, 1991	7	Canadian Heritage Languages Institute Act	C-37
February 1, 1991	8	Canadian Race Relations Foundation Act	C-63
February 1, 1991	9	Government Expenditures Restraint Act	C-69
February 1, 1991	10	Petro-Canada Public Participation Act	C-84
February 1, 1991	11	Broadcasting Act	C-40
February 1, 1991	12	European Bank for Reconstruction and Development Agreement Act	C-88
February 1, 1991	13	International Sale of Goods Contracts Convention Act	C-81
February 1, 1991	14	Canada Pension Plan (spousal agreement), An Act to amend the	C-260
February 1, 1991	15	Workers Mourning Day Act	C-223
March 27, 1991	16	Canadian Centre for Management Development Act	C-34
March 27, 1991	17	Centennial Flame Research Award Act	C-258
March 27, 1991	18	Appropriation Act No. 1, 1991-92	C-100
March 27, 1991	19	Appropriation Act No. 4, 1990-91	C-99
April 11, 1991	20	Parliament of Canada Act, An Act to amend the	C-79
April 11, 1991	21	Bretton Woods and Related Agreements Act, An Act to amend the	C-93
April 11, 1991	22	Farm Income Protection Act	C-98
April 11, 1991	23	Borrowing Authority Act, 1991-92	C-97
May 8, 1991	24	Financial Administration Act and other Acts in consequence thereof, An Act to amend the	C-91

==== 3rd Session ====
===== Public acts (1991) =====
Date of Assent	Index	Title	Bill Number
June 14, 1991	25	British Columbia Grain Handling Operations Act	C-25
June 21, 1991	26	Proceeds of Crime (money laundering) Act	C-9
June 21, 1991	27	National Energy Board Act, An Act to amend the	C-2
June 21, 1991	28	Weapons, An Act respecting exporting, importing, manufacturing, buying or selling of or other dealing with certain	C-6
June 21, 1991	29	Appropriation Act No. 2, 1991-92	C-24
October 2, 1991	30	Public Sector Compensation Act	C-29
October 11, 1991	31	Thunder Bay Grain Handling Operations Act	C-37
October 29, 1991	32	Port Warden for the Harbour of Quebec and An Act to amend and consolidate the Acts relating to the office of Port Warden for the Harbour of Montreal, and to validate certain fees and charges established pursuant thereto, An Act to amend An Act to provide for the appointment of a	C-14
October 29, 1991	33	Canadian Wheat Board Act, An Act to amend the	C-23
October 29, 1991	34	Agricultural Products Marketing Act and to provide for other matters in relation thereto, An Act to amend the	C-16
October 29, 1991	35	Postal Services Continuation Act, 1991	C-40
October 29, 1991	36	National Day of Remembrance Act	C-202
November 26, 1991	37	Railway Act (grain and flour subsidies), An Act to amend the	C-11
November 26, 1991	38	Crown Corporations Dissolution or Transfer Authorization Act	C-8
December 5, 1991	39	Canada Labour Code (geographic certification), An Act to amend the	C-44
December 5, 1991	40	Criminal Code and the Customs Tariff in consequence thereof, An Act to amend the	C-17
December 5, 1991	41	Foreign Missions and International Organizations Act	C-27
December 13, 1991	42	Excise Tax Act and the Excise Act, An Act to amend the	C-10
December 13, 1991	43	Criminal Code (mental disorder) and to amend the National Defence Act and the Young Offenders Act in consequence thereof	C-30
December 13, 1991	44	Canada Pension Plan, the Family Allowances Act and the Old Age Security Act, An Act to amend the	C-39
December 13, 1991	45	Trust and Loan Companies Act	C-4
December 13, 1991	46	Bank Act	C-19
December 13, 1991	47	Insurance Companies Act	C-28
December 13, 1991	48	Cooperative Credit Associations Act	C-34
December 17, 1991	49	Income Tax Act, the Canada Pension Plan, the Cultural Property Export and Import Act, the Income Tax Conventions Interpretation Act, the Tax Court of Canada Act, the Unemployment Insurance Act, the Canada-Newfoundland Atlantic Accord Implementation Act, the Canada-Nova Scotia Offshore Petroleum Resources Accord Implementation Act and certain related Acts, An Act to amend the	C-18
December 17, 1991	50	Federal Real Property Act	C-3
December 17, 1991	51	Budget Implementation Act, 1991	C-20
December 17, 1991	52	Telesat Canada Reorganization and Divestiture Act	C-38
December 17, 1991	53	Appropriation Act No. 3, 1991-92	C-47

===== Local and private acts (1991) =====
Date of Assent	Index	Title	Bill Number
October 2, 1991	54	University of Emmanuel College, An Act to amend the Act of incorporation of the	S-4
October 29, 1991	55	Seventh-Day Adventist Church in Canada, An Act to amend the Act of incorporation of the	S-3
December 13, 1991	56	Metropolitan General Insurance Company in order to authorize its continuance under the laws of the Province of Quebec, An Act to amend the Act of incorporation of	S-6

===== Public acts (1992) =====
Date of Assent	Index	Title	Bill Number
February 28, 1992	1	Miscellaneous Statute Law Amendment Act, 1991	C-35
February 28, 1992	2	Canada Pension Plan, An Act to amend the	C-57
February 28, 1992	3	Canada and Finland, Canada and the Czech and Slovak Federal Republic and Canada and the United Mexican States for the avoidance of double taxation with respect to income tax and the prevention of fiscal evasion and a convention between Canada and the United Mexican States for the exchange of information with respect to taxes, An Act to implement conventions between	S-2
March 19, 1992	4	Aeronautics Act and to amend An Act to amend the Aeronautics Act, An Act to amend the	C-5
March 19, 1992	5	Airport Transfer (Miscellaneous Matters) Act	C-15
March 31, 1992	6	Northwest Territories Act, An Act to amend the	C-64
March 31, 1992	7	Appropriation Act No. 4, 1991-92	C-65
March 31, 1992	8	Appropriation Act No. 1, 1992-93	C-66
March 31, 1992	9	Canada Assistance Plan, An Act to amend the	C-32
April 9, 1992	10	Federal-Provincial Fiscal Arrangements and Federal Post-Secondary Education and Health Contributions Act, An Act to amend the	C-60
April 9, 1992	11	Young Offenders Act and the Criminal Code, An Act to amend the	C-12
April 9, 1992	12	Borrowing Authority Act, 1992-93	C-61
June 4, 1992	13	Extradition Act, An Act to amend the	C-31
June 4, 1992	14	Competition Act (multi-level marketing plans and pyramid selling), An Act to amend the	C-68
June 4, 1992	15	National Public Service Week: Serving Canadians Better Act	C-328
June 4, 1992	16	National Defence Act, An Act to amend the	C-77
June 4, 1992	17	Special Economic Measures Act	C-53
June 18, 1992	18	Debt Servicing and Reduction Account Act	C-21
June 18, 1992	19	Spending Control Act	C-56
June 18, 1992	20	Correctional and Conditional Release Act	C-36
June 18, 1992	21	Persons with disabilities, An Act to amend certain Acts with respect to	C-78
June 18, 1992	22	Criminal Records Act and other Acts in consequence thereof, An Act to amend the	C-71
June 18, 1992	23	National Parks Act, An Act to amend the	C-59
June 18, 1992	24	Civilian War Pensions and Allowances Act, the War Veterans Allowance Act and the Pension Act and to amend other Acts in consequence thereof, An Act to amend the	C-84
June 18, 1992	25	Electoral Boundaries Readjustment Suspension Act	C-67
June 23, 1992	26	Canada Deposit Insurance Corporation Act and to amend other Acts in consequence thereof, An Act to amend the	C-48
June 23, 1992	27	Bankruptcy Act and to amend the Income Tax Act in consequence thereof, An Act to amend the	C-22
June 23, 1992	28	Customs Act, the Customs Tariff and the Excise Tax Act, An Act to amend the	C-74
June 23, 1992	29	Excise Tax Act and the Income Tax Act, An Act to amend the	C-75
June 23, 1992	30	Referendum Act	C-81
June 23, 1992	31	Coasting Trade Act	C-33
June 23, 1992	32	Canada Mortgage and Housing Corporation Act and the National Housing Act and to amend another Act in consequence thereof, An Act to amend the	C-82
June 23, 1992	33	Status of the Artist Act	C-7
June 23, 1992	34	Transportation of Dangerous Goods Act, 1992	C-45
June 23, 1992	35	Oil and Gas Production and Conservation Act and other Acts in consequence thereof, An Act to amend the	C-58
June 23, 1992	36	Energy Efficiency Act	C-41
June 23, 1992	37	Canadian Environmental Assessment Act	C-13
June 23, 1992	38	Criminal Code (sexual assault), An Act to amend the	C-49
June 23, 1992	39	Northwest Territories Waters Act	C-51
June 23, 1992	40	Yukon Territory Waters Act	C-52
June 23, 1992	41	Criminal Code (jury), An Act to amend the	C-70
June 23, 1992	42	Airport Transfer (Miscellaneous Matters) Act, An Act to amend the	S-11
June 23, 1992	43	Appropriation Act No. 2, 1992-93	C-87
September 29, 1992	44	Department of Forestry Act and to make related amendments to other Acts, An Act to amend the	C-306
September 29, 1992	45	Timiskaming, An Act to change the name of the electoral district of	C-351
September 29, 1992	46	Pensions and to enact the Special Retirement Arrangements Act and the Pension Benefits Division Act, An Act to amend certain Acts in relation to	C-55
October 15, 1992	47	Contraventions Act	C-46
October 15, 1992	48	Income Tax Act, to enact the Children's Special Allowances Act, to amend certain other Acts in consequence thereof and to repeal the Family Allowances Act, An Act to amend the	C-80
December 10, 1992	49	Immigration Act and other Acts in consequence thereof, An Act to amend the	C-86
December 10, 1992	50	Appropriation Act No. 3, 1992-93	C-100
December 10, 1992	51	Nova Scotia Courts Amendment Act, 1992	C-96
December 10, 1992	52	Wild Animal and Plant Protection and Regulation of International and Interprovincial Trade Act	C-42
December 10, 1992	53	Gwich'in Land Claim Settlement Act	C-94
December 10, 1992	54	Public Service Employment Act, the Public Service Staff Relations Act and other Acts in relation to the public service of Canada, An Act to amend the	C-54

===== Local and private acts (1992) =====
Date of Assent	Index	Title	Bill Number
June 23, 1992	55	Northwest Canada Conference Evangelical Church, An Act to amend An Act to incorporate the	S-9
June 23, 1992	56	Green Shield Canada, An Act to incorporate	S-10
June 23, 1992	57	Montreal Board of Trade and The Chamber of Commerce of Metropolitan Montreal, An Act to amalgamate The	S-12
September 29, 1992	58	Royal Society of Canada, An Act to amend An Act to incorporate the	S-7
December 17, 1992	59	United Grain Growers Act	S-16

===== Public acts (1993) =====
Date of Assent	Index	Title	Bill Number
February 4, 1993	1	Certain corporations and other bodies, An Act to dissolve or terminate	C-63
February 4, 1993	2	Patent Act, to amend another Act in consequence thereof and to provide for other related matters, An Act to amend the	C-91
February 25, 1993	3	Farm Products Marketing Agencies Act and other Acts in consequence thereof, An Act to amend the	C-54
February 25, 1993	4	Borrowing Authority Act, 1992-93 (No. 2)	C-98
March 25, 1993	5	Tobacco Sales to Young Persons Act	C-111
March 25, 1993	6	Small Businesses Loans Act and another Act in consequence thereof, An Act to amend the	C-99
March 25, 1993	7	Criminal Code (air and maritime safety), An Act to amend the	C-69
March 25, 1993	8	Divorce Act and the Family Order and Agreements Enforcement Assistance Act, An Act to amend the	C-79
March 30, 1993	9	Appropriation Act No. 4, 1992-93	C-119
March 30, 1993	10	Appropriation Act No. 1, 1993-94	C-120
March 30, 1993	11	Saskatchewan Treaty Land Entitlement Act	C-104
April 2, 1993	12	Budget Implementation (fiscal measures) Act, 1992	C-76
April 2, 1993	13	Government Expenditure Restraint Act, 1993 No. 2	C-113
April 2, 1993	14	Farm Credit Corporation Act	C-95
May 6, 1993	15	Intellectual Property Law Improvement Act	S-17
May 6, 1993	16	Motor Vehicle Safety Act	S-8
May 6, 1993	17	Canada Post Corporation Act, An Act to amend the	C-73
May 6, 1993	18	Child Day Act	C-371
May 6, 1993	19	Canada Elections Act, An Act to amend the	C-114
May 6, 1993	20	Borrowing Authority Act, 1993-94	C-117
May 6, 1993	21	Carriage of Goods by Water Act	C-83
May 6, 1993	22	Marine Insurance Act	C-97
May 6, 1993	23	Copyright Act, An Act to amend the	C-88
June 10, 1993	24	Income Tax Act, the Canada Pension Plan, the Income Tax Conventions Interpretation Act, the Tax Rebate Discounting Act, the Unemployment Insurance Act and certain related Acts, An Act to amend the	C-92
June 10, 1993	25	Customs Tariff, the Excise Act, the Excise Tax Act, the Customs Act, the Criminal Code and a related Act, An Act to amend the	C-102
June 10, 1993	26	Export Development Act, An Act to amend the	C-118
June 10, 1993	27	Excise Tax Act, the Access to Information Act, the Canada Pension Plan, the Customs Act, the Federal Court Act, the Income Tax Act, the Tax Court of Canada Act, the Tax Rate Discounting Act, the Unemployment Insurance Act and a related Act, An Act to amend the	C-112
June 10, 1993	28	Nunavut Act	C-132
June 10, 1993	29	Nunavut Land Claims Agreement Act	C-133
June 10, 1993	30	Appropriation Act No. 2, 1993-94	C-134
June 23, 1993	31	National Round Table on the Environment and the Economy Act	C-72
June 23, 1993	32	Explosives Act, An Act to amend the	C-107
June 23, 1993	33	Currency Act, An Act to amend the	C-124
June 23, 1993	34	Miscellaneous Statute Law Amendment Act, 1993	C-125
June 23, 1993	35	Investment Canada Act, An Act to amend the	C-89
June 23, 1993	36	Canada Shipping Act and to amend another Act in consequence thereof, An Act to amend the	C-121
June 23, 1993	37	Seized Property Management Act	C-123
June 23, 1993	38	Telecommunications Act	C-62
June 23, 1993	39	Customs Tariff (textile tariff reduction), An Act to amend the	C-122
June 23, 1993	40	Criminal Code, the Crown Liability and Proceedings Act and the Radiocommunication Act, An Act to amend the	C-109
June 23, 1993	41	Land Titles Repeal Act	C-103
June 23, 1993	42	Canada Labour Code and the Public Service Staff Relations Act, An Act to amend the	C-11
June 23, 1993	43	Northumberland Strait Crossing Act	C-110
June 23, 1993	44	North American Free Trade Agreement Implementation Act	C-115
June 23, 1993	45	Criminal Code and the Young Offenders Act, An Act to amend the	C-126
June 23, 1993	46	Criminal Code and the Customs Tariff (child pornography and corrupting morals), An Act to amend the	C-128
June 23, 1993	47	Petroleum-related Acts in respect of Canadian ownership requirements and to confirm the validity of a certain regulation, An Act to amend certain	C-106

===== Local and private acts (1993) =====
Date of Assent	Index	Title	Bill Number
June 23, 1993	48	Canadian Medical Association, An Act to change the name of The	S-20
