= Ratelle =

Ratelle is a surname. Notable people with the surname include:

- J.-Georges Ratelle (1883–1969), Canadian politician
- Jean Ratelle (born 1940), Canadian ice hockey player
