= Giuseppe Sciortino =

Italian-born Canadian lawyer and political activist (1949–2024)

Giuseppe Sciortino (October 14, 1949 – July 31, 2024) was an Italian-born Canadian lawyer and political activist in Quebec, Canada. He ran for both the National Assembly of Quebec and the House of Commons of Canada.

== Early life ==
Sciortino was born in Sicily, Italy, and moved to Canada as an adolescent. He spoke fluent French and has described himself as a francophone.

== Legal career ==
=== Victor Regalado case ===
In the 1980s, Sciortino represented Salvadoran journalist Victor Regalado, one of the first persons in Canada to be detained on a security certificate. Government ministers Robert Kaplan and Lloyd Axworthy ordered Regalado's arrest and deportation in 1982, charging that his continued presence in Canada was "detrimental to the national interest." The evidence against Regalado was kept secret, although the government suggested that he had entered the country "to carry out certain activities which are prohibited under Canadian law" and was working for the overthrow of "a government" (which media sources noted was presumably a reference to the right-wing government of El Salvador). Regalado denied being involved in any illegal activity, but indicated that he had been a member of the Communist Party of El Salvador and would face persecution if deported.

Shortly after Regalado's arrest, Sciortino issued subpoenas ordering Kaplan and Axworthy to testify at an immigration appeal board hearing on the matter. The ministers refused to appear, and the immigration board did not compel them to attend.

Regalado was later released from incarceration, but his deportation order was upheld by the Federal Court of Canada and the Federal Court of Appeal. In January 1987, the Supreme Court of Canada declined to hear a further appeal of his case. Sciortino indicated that he hoped a "political solution" would be found permitting Regalado to remain in Canada and indicated that his client was still trying to find out why he had been deemed a "security risk" in the first place.

In March 1987, Sciortino helped convince the federal New Democratic Party to pass a motion supporting Regalado. He later brought the case before the United Nations Human Rights Committee, arguing that the government's use of secret evidence was a violation of Regalado's civil and political rights. Regalado was ultimately allowed to stay in Canada, although the initial charges against him were never made public.

=== Other cases ===
Sciortino represented the Centrale des syndicats démocratiques in 1999 during a dispute between independent Quebec truckers and the provincial government. He represented the Concordia University student union in 2002 to oppose a moratorium on public events related to the Middle East conflict, and in 2005 he represented unionized workers at a Wal-Mart in Saguenay. He also represented the Alliance des professeures et professeurs de Montréal and advised the Montreal branch of the American Federation of Musicians.

== Political activist ==
=== New Democratic Party ===
Sciortino ran for the New Democratic Party of Quebec (NDP) in the 1985 provincial election in the predominantly Italian Canadian division of Viau. During the campaign, he was designated as the Quebec NDP's spokesperson for the province's cultural communities. The New Democratic Party did not have a strong presence in Quebec during this period, and Sciortino finished third.

In 1987, Sciortino strongly criticized the Canadian government's decision to prevent eighty-five Chilean refugees stranded in Argentina from gaining access to Canada. When interviewed on the matter, he said that the Chileans wanted to come to Canada to escape the "terrifying dictatorship" of Augusto Pinochet.

Sciortino defeated two challengers to win the federal New Democratic Party's nomination for Rosemont in the buildup to the 1988 federal election. Considered as one of the party's strongest candidates in Quebec, Sciortino openly sympathized with Quebec nationalism and expressed his support for the province's Charter of the French Language. Late in the campaign, he took part in a press conference called by NDP candidate Jean-Paul Harney to support using the notwithstanding clause of the Canadian Constitution to protect Quebec's francophone culture and restrict the use of other languages. This press conference was not endorsed by the NDP leadership and some believe that it cost the party support among Quebec's anglophones. Sciortino finished a fairly strong third on election day, amid a rise in NDP support among Montreal's francophone voters.

=== Parti Québécois ===
Sciortino later left the NDP and affiliated with the Quebec sovereigntist Parti Québécois (PQ), serving on its national executive. The PQ has traditionally had only limited support among Quebec's cultural communities, and Sciortino was one of its most prominent members from the Italian community. In 1992, he wrote a public letter defending PQ against charges that it was based around a narrow ethnic nationalism. The following year, he called for a "new linguistic agreement" that would protect the spirit of Quebec's Charter of the French Language while also recognizing the concerns of other linguistic communities.

In the buildup to the 1994 provincial election, Sciortino sought the PQ nomination for the east-end Montreal seat of Mercier. His candidacy was widely regarded as an important development for the PQ in building a support base among non-francophone voters. Sciortino initially won the nomination in a close contest over Robert Perreault, but the result was annulled due to voting irregularities. The first round of balloting at the first nomination meeting saw Perreault receive 245 votes, compared with 114 for Sciortino, 89 for retired civil servant Claude Bernard, and 71 for Jean-Louis Hérivault. Perreault's opponents joined forces, and Sciortino was elected by fourteen votes on the second ballot. The results were annulled when it was discovered that at least fifteen of Bernard's supporters had given improper addresses. Despite receiving an endorsement from party leader Jacques Parizeau, Sciortino was defeated by Perreault at a second meeting. The nomination contest was very divisive; Sciortino has said that Perreault's supporters smeared him as a communist and attacked him on the basis of his ethnic background.

The PQ won a majority government in the 1994 provincial election and Sciortino initially remained a member of the party's executive. He supported the sovereigntist option in the 1995 Quebec referendum and, after its narrow defeat, acknowledged that the PQ's outreach efforts to minority communities had not been successful. He resigned from the PQ executive in April 1996 and largely withdrew from party activities after this time.

On the night of the 1995 referendum, PQ premier Jacques Parizeau delivered a speech that blamed the sovereigntist defeat on "money and the ethnic vote." Sciortino later described this as a "wretched phrase ... pointless, and objectively false" and "not what one would expect from a statesman, from a democrat, as many, myself included, consider or considered Jacques Parizeau to be."

=== Italian community activism ===
In October 1996, Sciortino joined with other federalist and sovereigntist Italian Quebecers to issue a manifesto that recognized the right of all Quebecers to determine their future, called for reform in the Quebec Italian community's political culture, and encouraged the PQ to fully accept Quebec as a pluralistic society. Four years later, he led a movement to have the Papineau-Leblanc Bridge between Montreal and Laval named after the late Canadian Senator Pietro Rizzuto. Sciortino indicated that he did not agree politically with Rizzuto, who was a Liberal, but nonetheless believed that his contributions to Quebec should be recognized. The name change ultimately did not take place, due it part to opposition from others in the PQ.

== Death ==
Sciortino died on July 31, 2024, at the age of 74.

== Electoral record ==
1988 Canadian federal election: Rosemont
Party	Candidate	Votes	%	±%	Expenditures
Progressive Conservative	Benoît Tremblay	17,127	37.84		$44,311
Liberal	Jacques Guilbault	13,209	29.18	–	$45,624
New Democratic	Giuseppe Sciortino	9,163	20.24		$37,493
Independent	Suzanne Blais-Grenier	2,060	4.55		$8,864
Rhinoceros	Christian Nettoyeur Jolicoeur	1,656	3.66	–	$0
Green	Sylvain Auclair	1,383	3.06		$24
Communist	Gaétan Trudel	151	0.33		$18
Social Credit	Dollard Desjardins	148	0.33		$0
Marxist–Leninist	Arnold August	122	0.27		$130
Independent	Léo Larocque	122	0.27		$5,150
Commonwealth of Canada	Christiane Deland-Gervais	120	0.27		$0
Total valid votes		45,261	100.00		
Total rejected ballots		1,025			
Turnout		46,286	68.31		
Electors on the lists		67,754			
Source: Report of the Chief Electoral Officer, Thirty-fourth General Election, 1988.

1985 Quebec general election: Viau
Party	Candidate	Votes	%
Liberal	William Cusano	17,086	66.12
Parti Québécois	Marie-Claire Nivolon	7,428	28.75
New Democratic	Giuseppe Sciortino	864	3.34
Humanist	Doris Gervais	196	0.76
Commonwealth of Canada	Martin Daoust	148	0.57
Christian Socialist	Jean-François Grenier	118	0.46
Total valid votes		25,840	
Rejected and declined votes		491	
Turnout		26,331	71.05
Electors on the lists		37,062	
Source: Official Results, Le Directeur général des élections du Québec.
