= Bernard Bigras =

Canadian politician (born 1969)

Bernard Bigras MP

Member of Parliament for Rosemont—La Petite-Patrie (Rosemont—Petite-Patrie; 2000–2004) (Rosemont; 1997–2000)
- In office June 2, 1997 – May 2, 2011
- Preceded by: Benoit Tremblay
- Succeeded by: Alexandre Boulerice

Personal details
- Born: June 4, 1969 (age 56) Montreal, Quebec, Canada
- Party: Bloc Québécois
- Profession: Economist, political advisor

Bernard Bigras (born June 4, 1969) is a Canadian politician.

Born in Montreal, Quebec, Bigras was a Bloc Québécois member of the House of Commons of Canada from 1997 to 2011, representing the district of Rosemont—La Petite-Patrie. He is the former caucus chair of the Bloc, and is a former critic of Children and Youth, Cultural Communities, and Citizenship and Immigration and Environment. Bigras is a former economist and political adviser.

== Electoral record (incomplete) ==
2011 Canadian federal election: Rosemont—La Petite-Patrie
Party	Candidate	Votes	%	±%	Expenditures
New Democratic	Alexandre Boulerice	27,484	51.00		$34,354
Bloc Québécois	Bernard Bigras (incumbent)	17,702	32.84		$75,138
Liberal	Kettly Beauregard	4,920	9.13		$11,976
Conservative	Sébastien Forté	2,328	4.32		$5,770
Green	Sameer Muldeen	899	1.67		none listed
Rhinoceros	Jean-Patrick Berthiaume	417	0.77		$450
Marxist–Leninist	Stéphane Chénier	140	0.26		none listed
Total valid votes		53,890	100.00		
Total rejected ballots		589			
Turnout		54,479	66.47		
Electors on the lists		81,961			
Source: Official Results, Elections Canada and Financial Returns, Elections Canada.

2008 Canadian federal election: Rosemont—La Petite-Patrie
Party	Candidate	Votes	%	±%	Expenditures
Bloc Québécois	Bernard Bigras	27,260	52.00		$51,364
Liberal	Marjorie Théodore	9,785	18.67	–	$30,634
New Democratic	Alexandre Boulerice	8,522	16.26		$23,296
Conservative	Sylvie Boulianne	3,876	7.39		$85,754
Green	Vincent Larochelle	2,406	4.59	–	$903
neorhino.ca	Jean-Patrick Berthiaume	319	0.61	–	$270
Marxist–Leninist	Stéphane Chénier	170	0.32		none listed
N/A (Communist League)	Michel Dugré	83	0.16		$690
Total valid votes		52,421	100.00		
Total rejected ballots		614			
Turnout		53,035	64.65		
Electors on the lists		82,037			
Sources: Official Results, Elections Canada and Financial Returns, Elections Canada. Italicized expenditure figures refer to totals submitted by the candidates and not reviewed by Elections Canada.

2006 Canadian federal election
Party	Candidate	Votes	%	±%	Expenditures
Bloc Québécois	Bernard Bigras	29,336	55.99	-5.81	$51,157
Liberal	Suzanne Harvey	8,259	15.76	-7.14	$14,665
New Democratic	Chantal Reeves	6,051	11.55	+3.88	$9,537
Conservative	Michel Sauvé	4,873	9.30	+6.21	$16,108
Green	Marc-André Gadoury	3,457	6.60	+2.35	$3,983
Marijuana	Hugô St-Onge	419	0.80		
Total valid votes/Expense limit		52,395	100.00	$81,617	
Total rejected ballots		605	1.14		
Turnout		53,000	64.02		

2004 Canadian federal election
Party	Candidate	Votes	%	±%	Expenditures
Bloc Québécois	Bernard Bigras	31,224	61.80	+12.67	$52,350
Liberal	Christian Bolduc	11,572	22.90	-10.93	$74,577
New Democratic	Benoit Beauchamp	3,876	7.67	+4.68	$1,271
Green	François Chevalier	2,145	4.25	+1.14	$913
Conservative	Michel Sauvé	1,561	3.09	-3.99	$10,508
Communist	Kenneth Higham	145	0.29	-0.20	$647
Total valid votes/Expense limit		50,523	100.00	$81,229	
Total rejected ballots		847	1.65		
Turnout		51,370	61.54		

1997 Canadian federal election: Rosemont
Party	Candidate	Votes	%	±%	Expenditures
Bloc Québécois	Bernard Bigras	23,313	47.03	−12.05	$38,703
Liberal	Françoise Guidi	15,952	32.18	+2.06	$35,564
Progressive Conservative	Marc Bissonnette	7,727	15.59	+9.35	$14,735
New Democratic	Fidel Fuentes	1,637	3.30	+1.15	$3,285
Independent	Vicky Mercier	494	1.00		$229
Marxist–Leninist	Claude Brunelle	447	0.90		$34
Total valid votes		49,570	100.00		
Total rejected ballots		2,543			
Turnout		52,113	70.85		
Electors on the lists		73,551			
Sources: Official Results, Elections Canada and official contributions and expenses submitted by the candidates, provided by Elections Canada. Percentage changes are factored for redistribution.
