= Claude-André Lachance =

Canadian politician (born 1954)

Member of Parliament for Rosemont (Lafontaine; 1974–1979)
- In office July 8, 1974 – September 4, 1984
- Preceded by: Georges-C. Lachance
- Succeeded by: Suzanne Blais-Grenier

Personal details
- Born: April 5, 1954 (age 72) Montreal, Quebec
- Party: Liberal
- Relations: Georges-C. Lachance, father
- Committees: Chair, Standing Committee on Justice and Legal Affairs (1980-1984)
- Portfolio: Parliamentary Secretary to the Minister of State (Trade) (1980-1981); Parliamentary Secretary to the Minister of Justice and Attorney General of Canada (1978-1979)

Claude-André Lachance (born April 5, 1954) is a former Canadian politician. At the time of his election, aged 20, Lachance was the youngest person ever to be elected to the House of Commons of Canada, and held this record until the election of 19-year-old Pierre-Luc Dusseault in 2011.

Born in Montreal, Quebec, he was first elected as a Liberal candidate in the 1974 federal election in the Montreal riding of Rosemont. He was re-elected in the 1979 and 1980 elections. He was appointed Parliamentary Secretary to the Minister of Justice and Attorney General of Canada (1978) and Minister of State (Trade) (1980–1981).

He earned a Civil Law degree from McGill University, followed by a master's degree in Public Law from University of Ottawa. He was admitted to the Québec Bar in 1977.

He is currently Government Affairs Director for Dow Canada.

== Electoral record ==
1980 Canadian federal election: Rosemont
Party	Candidate	Votes	%	±%
Liberal	Claude-André Lachance	26,544	75.86	+4.85
New Democratic	Marcel Julien	3,337	9.54	+3.89
Progressive Conservative	Léon Vellone	2,260	6.46	−1.44
Rhinoceros	G. Mara Tremblay	1,310	3.74	+0.59
Social Credit	Yvette Gosselin	912	2.61	−7.29
Non-Affiliated	Jocelyne Lachapelle	199	0.57	
Independent	René Denis	197	0.56	−0.73
Union populaire	Monique Fournier	139	0.40	−0.02
Marxist–Leninist	Francine Tremblay	91	0.26	−0.03
Total valid votes		34,989	100.00	
Total rejected ballots		543		
Turnout		35,532	63.91	−9.75
Electors on the lists		55,596		
Source: Report of the Chief Electoral Officer, Thirty-second General Election, 1980.

1979 Canadian federal election: Rosemont
Party	Candidate	Votes	%	±%
Liberal	Claude-André Lachance	28,116	71.01	
Social Credit	Emery Whelan	3,919	9.90	
Progressive Conservative	Léon Vellone	3,129	7.90	
New Democratic	Marcel Julien	2,238	5.65	
Rhinoceros	Francine Lévesque	1,248	3.15	–
Independent	René Denis	509	1.29	
Union populaire	André Kishka	167	0.42	
Communist	Bernadette LeBrun	156	0.39	
Marxist–Leninist	Francine Tremblay	115	0.29	
Total valid votes		39,597	100.00	
Total rejected ballots		708		
Turnout		40,305	73.66	
Electors on the lists		54,718		
Source: Report of the Chief Electoral Officer, Thirty-first General Election, 1979.
