= Jean-Louis Hérivault =

Jean-Louis Hérivault (June 23, 1942 – October 20, 2007) was an economist, administrator, politician, and diplomat based in the Canadian province of Quebec.

== Early life and career ==
Hérivault was born in Tours, France. He received a degree in economics from the Universite de Poitiers and a degree in public law from the Universite de Paris. He moved to Canada in 1967 to teach at the University of Prince Edward Island and, while living in the Maritimes, earned a Master of Business Administration degree from Dalhousie University. He later moved to Ottawa and taught at Algonquin College.

In 1977, he moved to Montreal and became vice-dean of Vanier College. Eight years later, he was appointed by the government of Quebec as chief executive officer of the Institut de recherche et d'information sur la remuneration. He also served as the president of Quebec's MBA association and as director-general of the Association Québécoise des Pharmaciens.

== Political candidate and diplomat ==
A supporter of Quebec sovereignty, Hérivault ran as a Bloc Québécois (BQ) candidate in the 1993 Canadian federal election. Considered to be on the right wing of the party, he called for deficit reduction during the campaign. He finished a relatively close second against Liberal Party candidate Martin Cauchon in the Montreal division of Outremont. After the election, he became as vice-chair of the Centre for Research-Action on Race Relations." He ran for the Parti Québécois (PQ) nomination for Mercier in the buildup to the 1994 provincial election, but lost to Giuseppe Sciortino.

Hérivault served as Quebec's delegate-general to Ontario and was the province's official representative in Western Canada from February 1995 to 2004. In the latter capacity, he oversaw trade connections valued at six billion dollars per year. He continued to voice his support for Quebec sovereignty, although he clarified that this was not the primary purpose of his mission.

== Death ==
Hérivault died of cancer on October 20, 2007.

== Electoral record ==
1993 Canadian federal election: Outremont
Party	Candidate	Votes	%	±%	Expenditures
Liberal	Martin Cauchon	21,697	47.05	–	$46,300
Bloc Québécois	Jean-Louis Hérivault	17,258	37.42		$52,496
Progressive Conservative	Jean Pierre Hogue	4,011	8.70		$52,808
New Democratic Party	Catherine Kallos	2,055	4.46		$2,393
Natural Law	Daniel Bergeron	695	1.51		$391
Marxist-Leninist	Michel Rocheleau	185	0.40		$80
Abolitionist	Sylvain M. Coulombe	130	0.28		$0
Commonwealth	Mamunor Rashid	84	0.18		$0
Total valid votes		46,115	100.00		
Total rejected ballots		1,317			
Turnout		47,432	78.20		
Electors on the lists		60,655			
Source: Thirty-fifth General Election, 1993: Official Voting Results, Published by the Chief Electoral Officer of Canada. Financial figures taken from the official contributions and expenses submitted by the candidates, provided by Elections Canada.
