= 1990 Chambly federal by-election =

A by-election was held in the federal riding of Chambly in Quebec, Canada on February 12, 1990, following the resignation of Progressive Conservative Richard Grisé.

Phil Edmonston won a huge victory pushing the PCs into third place becoming the first New Democratic Party (NDP) Member of Parliament in Quebec. He defeated former Quebec cabinet minister Clifford Lincoln by almost 20,000 votes. However, in the 1993 federal election, Edmonston retired and the seat was taken by the Bloc Québécois and the NDP were reduced to just 3% of the vote.

== Results ==
By-election on 12 February 1990 Resignation of Richard Grisé, 30 May 1989
Party	Candidate	Votes	%	±%
New Democratic	Phil Edmonston	26,998	67.63	+36.11
Liberal	Clifford Lincoln	7,000	17.54	-2.33
Progressive Conservative	Serge Bégin	3,819	9.57	-37.07
Green	Jocelyne Décarie	1,846	4.62	–
Independent	Gilles Maillé	160	0.40	–
Social Credit	Emilien Martel	96	0.24	–
Total valid votes		39,919	100.00	

== 1988 results ==
1988 Canadian federal election
Party	Candidate	Votes	%	±%
Progressive Conservative	Richard Grisé	25,770	47.04	-4.75
New Democratic	Phil Edmonston	17,268	31.52	+20.37
Liberal	Bernard Loiselle	10,886	19.87	-9.84
Rhinoceros	Stéphane Desmarteau	792	1.45	-2.38
Commonwealth of Canada	Gilles Racine	64	0.12	-0.19
Total valid votes		54,780	100.00	
