= Benoît Tremblay =

Canadian politician

Member of Parliament for Rosemont
- In office 21 November 1988 – 2 June 1997
- Preceded by: Suzanne Blais-Grenier
- Succeeded by: Bernard Bigras

Member of the Montreal City Council for Sault-au-Récollet
- In office 9 November 1986 – 12 December 1988

Personal details
- Born: 16 March 1948 Val-Brillant, Quebec, Canada
- Party: Bloc Québécois (1990–1997)
- Other political affiliations: Independent (1990); Progressive Conservative (1988–1990)
- Occupation: Politician; Economist; Administrator

Benoît Tremblay (French pronunciation: [bənwa tʁɑ̃blɛ]; born 16 March 1948) was a Canadian politician and a member of the House of Commons of Canada from 1988 to 1997.

== Background ==
Tremblay was born on 16 March 1948 in Val-Brillant, Quebec. He had a career in Economics and Administration.

== Municipal politics ==
He successfully ran as a candidate of Jean Doré's Rassemblement des citoyens et citoyennes de Montréal (RCM) for the district of Sault-au-Récollet in November 1986.

Tremblay resigned from the City Council on 12 December 1988, after he won a seat to the House of Commons of Canada.

== Federal politics ==
He had been elected as a Progressive Conservative candidate in the district of Rosemont.

Following the 1990 implosion of the Meech Lake Accord, he left the Progressive Conservative party on 26 June 1990. He sat in Parliament as an independent member and eventually became one of the first members to join the Bloc Québécois party. He was re-elected in the 1993 under his new party banner.

After serving in the 34th and 35th Canadian Parliaments, Tremblay left Canadian politics as he did not seek a third term in the House of Commons.

== Academic life ==
He is currently a professor at HEC Montréal where he is also the Director of the Desjardins Centre for Studies in Management of Financial Services Cooperatives.

== Electoral record (partial) ==
1993 Canadian federal election: Rosemont
Party	Candidate	Votes	%	±%	Expenditures
Bloc Québécois	Benoît Tremblay	29,414	62.95		$42,398
Liberal	Pierre Bourque	12,826	27.45	−1.73	$33,639a
Progressive Conservative	Pauline Vincent	2,519	5.39	−32.45	$27,356
New Democratic	Roger Lamarre	1,037	2.22	−18.02	$885
Natural Law	Marc Roy	646	1.38		$10,900
Marxist–Leninist	Hélène Héroux	189	0.40	+0.13	$80
Commonwealth of Canada	Stéphane Levesque	93	0.20	−0.07	$0
Total valid votes		46,724	100.00		
Total rejected ballots		2,089			
Turnout		48,813	75.43	+7.12	
Electors on the lists		64,717			
a Does not include unpaid claims. Source: Thirty-fifth General Election, 1993: Official Voting Results, Published by the Chief Electoral Officer of Canada. Financial figures taken from the official contributions and expenses submitted by the candidates, provided by Elections Canada.

1988 Canadian federal election: Rosemont
Party	Candidate	Votes	%	±%	Expenditures
Progressive Conservative	Benoît Tremblay	17,127	37.84		$44,311
Liberal	Jacques Guilbault	13,209	29.18	–	$45,624
New Democratic	Giuseppe Sciortino	9,163	20.24		$37,493
Independent	Suzanne Blais-Grenier	2,060	4.55		$8,864
Rhinoceros	Christian Nettoyeur Jolicoeur	1,656	3.66	–	$0
Green	Sylvain Auclair	1,383	3.06		$24
Communist	Gaétan Trudel	151	0.33		$18
Social Credit	Dollard Desjardins	148	0.33		$0
Marxist–Leninist	Arnold August	122	0.27		$130
Independent	Léo Larocque	122	0.27		$5,150
Commonwealth of Canada	Christiane Deland-Gervais	120	0.27		$0
Total valid votes		45,261	100.00		
Total rejected ballots		1,025			
Turnout		46,286	68.31		
Electors on the lists		67,754			
Source: Report of the Chief Electoral Officer, Thirty-fourth General Election, 1988.

Political offices
Preceded by Fernand Joubert (Parti Civique)	City Councillor, District of Sault-au-Récollet (#18); 1986-1988	Succeeded by Serge Sauvageau (Parti Civique)
Parliament of Canada
Preceded by Suzanne Blais-Grenier	Member of Parliament for Rosemont; 1988–1997	Succeeded by Bernard Bigras
