= J.-Georges Ratelle =

Canadian politician

Member of Parliament for Lafontaine
- In office June 1949 – April 1962
- Preceded by: (riding created)
- Succeeded by: Georges-C. Lachance

Personal details
- Born: 5 June 1883 Saint-Liguori, Quebec, Canada
- Died: 30 August 1969 (aged 86) Montreal, Quebec, Canada
- Party: Liberal
- Spouse(s): Albine Rivet m 1 October 1907
- Profession: insurance broker

J.-Georges Ratelle (5 June 1883 – 30 August 1969) was a Liberal party member of the House of Commons of Canada. He was born in Saint-Liguori, Quebec and became an insurance broker by career.

He was first elected at the Lafontaine riding in the 1949 general election and held that riding for four terms from the 21st to the 24th Parliaments. Ratelle left federal politics in 1962 and did not seek another term in Parliament.
