= Suzanne Blais-Grenier =

Canadian politician (1936–2017)

The Honourable Suzanne Blais-Grenier PC

Minister of the Environment
- In office September 17, 1984 – August 19, 1985
- Prime Minister: Brian Mulroney
- Preceded by: Charles Caccia
- Succeeded by: Thomas McMillan

Member of Parliament for Rosemont
- In office September 4, 1984 – November 21, 1988
- Preceded by: Claude-André Lachance
- Succeeded by: Benoît Tremblay

Personal details
- Born: March 2, 1936
- Died: June 13, 2017 (aged 81)
- Party: Independent (1988–2017)
- Other political affiliations: Progressive Conservative Party (1984–1988)

Suzanne Blais-Grenier PC (March 2, 1936 – June 13, 2017) was a Canadian politician.

Blais-Grenier was elected to the House of Commons of Canada in the 1984 federal election that brought Brian Mulroney to power. She represented the riding of Rosemont, Quebec. She was appointed to the Cabinet as Prime Minister Mulroney's first Minister of the Environment.

She faced mounting criticism from environmentalists following cuts to various programs, her lackluster performance over several months when being targeted by the Opposition in the House of Commons during question period and her spending on foreign travel. Blais-Grenier was demoted in 1985 to the position of Minister of State for Transport.

Following the demotion, Blais-Grenier became increasingly critical of the Mulroney government. At the end of 1985, she resigned from Cabinet to protest the government's refusal to prevent the closure of an oil refinery in Montreal.

On September 20, 1988, she was expelled from the Progressive Conservative caucus for refusing to withdraw allegations of kickbacks involving the Quebec wing of the party. She ran as an independent candidate in the November 1988 general election, but was defeated by Progressive Conservative Benoît Tremblay, and came in fourth place with 2,060 votes.

== Electoral record (partial) ==
1988 Canadian federal election: Rosemont
Party	Candidate	Votes	%	±%	Expenditures
Progressive Conservative	Benoît Tremblay	17,127	37.84		$44,311
Liberal	Jacques Guilbault	13,209	29.18	–	$45,624
New Democratic	Giuseppe Sciortino	9,163	20.24		$37,493
Independent	Suzanne Blais-Grenier	2,060	4.55		$8,864
Rhinoceros	Christian Nettoyeur Jolicoeur	1,656	3.66	–	$0
Green	Sylvain Auclair	1,383	3.06		$24
Communist	Gaétan Trudel	151	0.33		$18
Social Credit	Dollard Desjardins	148	0.33		$0
Marxist–Leninist	Arnold August	122	0.27		$130
Independent	Léo Larocque	122	0.27		$5,150
Commonwealth of Canada	Christiane Deland-Gervais	120	0.27		$0
Total valid votes		45,261	100.00		
Total rejected ballots		1,025			
Turnout		46,286	68.31		
Electors on the lists		67,754			
Source: Report of the Chief Electoral Officer, Thirty-fourth General Election, 1988.
