= Lafontaine (electoral district) =

Former federal electoral district in Quebec, Canada

Quebec electoral district

Defunct federal electoral district
- Legislature: House of Commons
- District created: 1947
- District abolished: 1976
- First contested: 1949
- Last contested: 1974

Lafontaine (French pronunciation: [lafɔ̃tɛn]; also known as Lafontaine—Rosemont) was a federal electoral district in Quebec, Canada, that was represented in the House of Commons of Canada from 1949 to 1979.

This riding was created in 1947 from parts of Hochelaga, St. James and St. Mary ridings. It consisted of a part of the city of Montreal.

The riding's name was changed in 1975 to "Lafontaine—Rosemont", and the riding was abolished in 1976 when it was redistributed into Hochelaga, Laurier, Maisonneuve and Rosemont ridings.

== Members of Parliament ==
This riding elected the following members of Parliament:

Parliament	Years	Member	Party
Lafontaine; Riding created from Hochelaga, St. James and St. Mary
21st	1949–1953	J.-Georges Ratelle	Liberal
22nd	1953–1957	J.-Georges Ratelle	Liberal
23rd	1957–1958	J.-Georges Ratelle	Liberal
24th	1958–1962	J.-Georges Ratelle	Liberal
25th	1962–1963	Georges-C. Lachance	Liberal
26th	1963–1965	Georges-C. Lachance	Liberal
27th	1965–1968	Georges-C. Lachance	Liberal
28th	1968–1972	Georges-C. Lachance	Liberal
29th	1972–1974	Georges-C. Lachance	Liberal
30th	1974–1979	Claude-André Lachance	Liberal
Riding dissolved into Hochelaga, Laurier, Maisonneuve and Rosemont

== Election results ==
1949 Canadian federal election
Party	Candidate	Votes
Liberal	J.-Georges Ratelle	12,883
Independent	Joseph-Marie Savignac	7,846
Independent Liberal	Bruno-Roméo Desormiers	3,245
Progressive Conservative	Paul Lamarche	331
Independent Liberal	Emile Naud	328
Co-operative Commonwealth	Jean Sylvestre	217

1953 Canadian federal election
Party	Candidate	Votes
Liberal	J.-Georges Ratelle	15,285
Progressive Conservative	Charlemagne Houle	3,438
Co-operative Commonwealth	Oscar Latreille	1,311
Labor–Progressive	Gabrielle Dionne	392

1957 Canadian federal election
Party	Candidate	Votes
Liberal	J.-Georges Ratelle	15,501
Progressive Conservative	Charlemagne Houle	4,593
Co-operative Commonwealth	Hector Rochon	1,095

1958 Canadian federal election
Party	Candidate	Votes
Liberal	J.-Georges Ratelle	12,195
Progressive Conservative	Dollard Dansereau	10,299
Co-operative Commonwealth	Hector Rochon	979
Independent PC	Paul Vézina	276

1962 Canadian federal election
Party	Candidate	Votes
Liberal	Georges-C. Lachance	10,000
Progressive Conservative	Dollard Dansereau	6,212
New Democratic	Blaise-J.-L. Daigneault	1,665
Social Credit	Roger Smith-Verrault	1,660
Independent PC	Roger Julien	1,118

1963 Canadian federal election
Party	Candidate	Votes
Liberal	Georges-C. Lachance	10,929
Social Credit	Roger Smith	4,456
New Democratic	J.-P. Forest	3,340
Progressive Conservative	Roméo Des Rochers	2,937

1965 Canadian federal election
Party	Candidate	Votes
Liberal	Georges-C. Lachance	9,101
New Democratic	Réginald Boisvert	3,804
Progressive Conservative	Gertrude Lessard	3,742
Ralliement créditiste	Roger Smith	1,896
Communist	Lucien Jacques	342

1968 Canadian federal election
Party	Candidate	Votes
Liberal	Georges-C. Lachance	14,786
Progressive Conservative	André Gagnon	6,412
New Democratic	Guy Lalonde	3,142
Ralliement créditiste	Émile Robert	879
Independent Liberal	Albert Leach	210

1972 Canadian federal election
Party	Candidate	Votes
Liberal	Georges-C. Lachance	13,508
Progressive Conservative	Pierre Bouchard	6,134
Social Credit	Octave Grosariu	5,078
New Democratic	Gabriel Gagnon	3,350
Independent	Alain Beiner	228

1974 Canadian federal election
Party	Candidate	Votes
Liberal	Claude-André Lachance	11,399
Progressive Conservative	Pierre Bouchard	7,887
New Democratic	J.D.R. Robert Dépatie	2,104
Social Credit	Octave Grosariu	2,045
Marxist–Leninist	Françoise Roy	120
Communist	Lydia Morand	118

== See also ==
- List of Canadian electoral districts
- Historical federal electoral districts of Canada
