= Rosemont—La Petite-Patrie (federal electoral district) =

Federal electoral district in Quebec, Canada

Quebec electoral district
- Interactive map of riding boundaries from the 2015 federal election

Federal electoral district
- Legislature: House of Commons
MP
Vacant
- District created: 1976
- First contested: 1979
- Last contested: 2025
- District webpage: profile, map

Demographics
- Population (2016): 110,677
- Electors (2015): 83,936
- Area (km²): 10.67
- Pop. density (per km²): 10,372.7
- Census division: Montreal
- Census subdivision: Montreal (part)

Rosemont—La Petite-Patrie (French pronunciation: [ʁozmɔ̃ la pətit patʁi]; formerly known as Rosemont and Rosemont—Petite-Patrie) is a federal electoral district in Quebec, Canada, that has been represented in the House of Commons of Canada since 1979.

== Geography ==
The district includes the neighbourhood of Petite-Patrie and the part of Rosemont south of Pie-IX Boulevard. Its whole territory is part of the Montreal Borough of Rosemont–La Petite-Patrie.

== Demographics ==
According to the 2021 Canadian census

- Languages: (2021) 74.2% French, 5.2% English, 4.5% Spanish, 2.5% Arabic, 1.3% Portuguese, 1.1% Italian

== Riding associations ==
Riding associations are the local branches of political parties:

Party	Association name	CEO	HQ City
Conservative	Association du Parti conservateur de Rosemont—La Petite-Patrie	Philip Mastromatteo	Mirabel
Liberal	Association libérale fédérale de Rosemont—La Petite-Patrie	Nicolas Lavoie	Montreal
New Democratic	Association NPD Rosemont—La Petite-Patrie	Anthony LaSalle	Montreal

== History ==
The riding was created under the name "Rosemont" in 1976 from parts of the ridings of Lafontaine, Maisonneuve—Rosemont, Papineau, and Saint-Michel. The name was changed to "Rosemont—Petite-Patrie" in 2000, and then to its current name in 2003.

This riding gained a small fraction of territory from Outremont during the 2012 electoral redistribution.

=== Members of Parliament ===
This riding has elected the following members of Parliament:

Parliament	Years	Member	Party
Rosemont; Riding created from Lafontaine, Maisonneuve—Rosemont, Papineau and Saint-Michel
31st	1979–1980	Claude-André Lachance	Liberal
32nd	1980–1984	Claude-André Lachance	Liberal
33rd	1984–1988	Suzanne Blais-Grenier	Progressive Conservative
34th	1988–1990	Benoît Tremblay	Progressive Conservative
34th	1990–1990	Benoît Tremblay	Independent
34th	1990–1993	Benoît Tremblay	Bloc Québécois
35th	1993–1997	Benoît Tremblay	Bloc Québécois
36th	1997–2000	Bernard Bigras	Bloc Québécois
Rosemont—Petite-Patrie
37th	2000–2004	Bernard Bigras	Bloc Québécois
Rosemont—La Petite-Patrie
38th	2004–2006	Bernard Bigras	Bloc Québécois
39th	2006–2008	Bernard Bigras	Bloc Québécois
40th	2008–2011	Bernard Bigras	Bloc Québécois
41st	2011–2015	Alexandre Boulerice	New Democratic
42nd	2015–2019	Alexandre Boulerice	New Democratic
43rd	2019–2021	Alexandre Boulerice	New Democratic
44th	2021–2025	Alexandre Boulerice	New Democratic
45th	2025–2026	Alexandre Boulerice	New Democratic
45th	2026–2026	Alexandre Boulerice	Independent
45th	2026–present	Vacant	Vacant

== Election results ==
=== Rosemont—La Petite-Patrie, 2003 – present ===
Canadian federal by-election, Pending Resignation of Alexandre Boulerice (August 25, 2026)
The by-election will be held on or before April 12, 2027.
Party	Candidate	Votes	%	±%
New Democratic	Pierre Céré			
Liberal	TBD			
Bloc Québécois	Alexandre Curzi			
Conservative	TBD			
Green	TBD			
People's	TBD			
Total valid votes				
Total rejected ballots				
Turnout				
Eligible voters				
Note:The New Democratic Party won the seat in the 2025 general election, but Boulerice resigned from the caucus and sat as an independent MP on April 27, 2026.
Source: Elections Canada

2025 Canadian federal election
Party	Candidate	Votes	%	±%	Expenditures
New Democratic	Alexandre Boulerice	24,358	40.99	−7.58	$92,456.20
Liberal	Jean-Sébastien Vallée	18,757	31.57	+8.40	$24,721.13
Bloc Québécois	Olivier Gignac	10,864	18.28	−3.09	$22,137.00
Conservative	Laetitia Tchatat	4,073	6.85	+2.86	$2,806.26
Green	Benoît Morham	1,368	2.30	−0.08	$0.00
Total valid votes		59,420	98.75	+0.64	$129,252.39
Total rejected ballots		755	1.25	–0.64	
Turnout		60,175	72.30	+4.54	
Eligible voters		83,229			
New Democratic hold		Swing		−7.99	
Source: Elections Canada

2021 Canadian federal election
Party	Candidate	Votes	%	±%	Expenditures
New Democratic	Alexandre Boulerice	26,708	48.57	+6.20	$98,099.40
Liberal	Nancy Drolet	12,738	23.17	-1.01	$24,844.91
Bloc Québécois	Shophika Vaithyanathasarma	11,751	21.37	-2.36	$18,485.74
Conservative	Surelys Perez Hernandez	2,199	4.00	+1.67	none listed
Green	Franco Fiori	1,308	2.38	-3.48	$0.00
Marxist–Leninist	Gisèle Desrochers	284	0.52	+0.37	$0.00
Total valid votes/Expense limit		54,988	98.11	–	$112,449.00
Total rejected ballots		1,062	1.89		
Turnout		56,050	67.76		
Eligible voters		82,719			
New Democratic hold		Swing		+3.61	
Source: Elections Canada

2019 Canadian federal election
Party	Candidate	Votes	%	±%	Expenditures
New Democratic	Alexandre Boulerice	25,575	42.48	-6.69	$108,791.68
Liberal	Geneviève Hinse	14,576	24.21	+3.53	$67,673.40
Bloc Québécois	Claude André	14,306	23.76	+2.73	$16,536.02
Green	Jean Désy	3,539	5.88	+2.82	$4,206.72
Conservative	Johanna Sarfati	1,405	2.33	-1.96	$2,398.66
Rhinoceros	Jos Guitare Lavoie	346	0.57	-0.28	
People's	Bobby Pellerin	293	0.49		$1,385.02
Communist	Normand Raymond	86	0.14		
Marxist–Leninist	Gisèle Desrochers	80	0.13	-0.16	
Total valid votes/expense limit		60,206	100.0		
Total rejected ballots		718			
Turnout		60,924			
Eligible voters		85,290			
New Democratic hold		Swing		-5.11	
Source: Elections Canada

2015 Canadian federal election
Party	Candidate	Votes	%	±%	Expenditures
New Democratic	Alexandre Boulerice	28,692	49.17	-1.90	$110,249.53
Bloc Québécois	Claude André	12,276	21.03	-11.82	$56,203.37
Liberal	Nadine Medawar	12,069	20.68	+11.53	$11,102.48
Conservative	Jeremy Dohan	2,506	4.29	-0.03	$3,537.24
Green	Sameer Muldeen	1,787	3.06	+1.39	–
Rhinoceros	Laurent Aglat	495	0.85	+0.08	–
Libertarian	Peter d'Entremont	353	0.60	–	–
Marxist–Leninist	Stéphane Chénier	171	0.29	+0.03	–
Total valid votes/Expense limit		–	100.0		$222,080.44
Total rejected ballots		–	–	–	
Turnout		58,349	69.13	+2.22	
Eligible voters		83,936			
New Democratic hold		Swing		−1.9	
Source: Elections Canada

2011 federal election redistributed results
Party	Vote	%
New Democratic	27,644	51.07
Bloc Québécois	17,731	32.76
Liberal	4,951	9.15
Conservative	2,337	4.32
Green	906	1.67
Others	558	1.03

2011 Canadian federal election
Party	Candidate	Votes	%	±%	Expenditures
New Democratic	Alexandre Boulerice	27,484	51.00	+34.74	
Bloc Québécois	Bernard Bigras	17,702	32.85	-19.15	
Liberal	Kettly Beauregard	4,920	9.13	-9.54	
Conservative	Sébastien Forté	2,328	4.32	-3.07	
Green	Sameer Muldeen	899	1.67	-2.92	
Rhinoceros	Jean-Patrick Berthiaume	417	0.77	+0.16	
Marxist–Leninist	Stéphane Chénier	140	0.26	-0.06	
Total valid votes/Expense limit		53,890	100.00		
Total rejected ballots		589	1.08		
Turnout		54,479	66.91		

2008 Canadian federal election
Party	Candidate	Votes	%	±%	Expenditures
Bloc Québécois	Bernard Bigras	27,260	52.00	-3.99	$52,571
Liberal	Marjorie Théodore	9,785	18.67	+2.91	$30,634
New Democratic	Alexandre Boulerice	8,522	16.26	+4.71	$21,117
Conservative	Sylvie Boulianne	3,876	7.39	-1.91	$85,619
Green	Vincent Larochelle	2,406	4.59	-2.01	$903
Rhinoceros	Jean-Patrick Berthiaume	319	0.61	–	$228
Marxist–Leninist	Stéphane Chérnier	170	0.32	–	
Independent	Michel Dugré	83	0.16	–	$690
Total valid votes/Expense limit		52,421	100.00	$86,436	
Total rejected ballots		614	1.16		
Turnout		53,035	64.65		

2006 Canadian federal election
Party	Candidate	Votes	%	±%	Expenditures
Bloc Québécois	Bernard Bigras	29,336	55.99	-5.81	$51,157
Liberal	Suzanne Harvey	8,259	15.76	-7.14	$14,665
New Democratic	Chantal Reeves	6,051	11.55	+3.88	$9,537
Conservative	Michel Sauvé	4,873	9.30	+6.21	$16,108
Green	Marc-André Gadoury	3,457	6.60	+2.35	$3,983
Marijuana	Hugô St-Onge	419	0.80		
Total valid votes/Expense limit		52,395	100.00	$81,617	
Total rejected ballots		605	1.14		
Turnout		53,000	64.02		

2004 Canadian federal election
Party	Candidate	Votes	%	±%	Expenditures
Bloc Québécois	Bernard Bigras	31,224	61.80	+12.67	$52,350
Liberal	Christian Bolduc	11,572	22.90	-10.93	$74,577
New Democratic	Benoit Beauchamp	3,876	7.67	+4.68	$1,271
Green	François Chevalier	2,145	4.25	+1.14	$913
Conservative	Michel Sauvé	1,561	3.09	-3.99	$10,508
Communist	Kenneth Higham	145	0.29	-0.20	$647
Total valid votes/Expense limit		50,523	100.00	$81,229	
Total rejected ballots		847	1.65		
Turnout		51,370	61.54		

Note: Conservative vote is compared to the total of the Canadian Alliance vote and Progressive Conservative vote in 2000 election.

=== Rosemont—Petite-Patrie, 2000 - 2003 ===
2000 Canadian federal election
Party	Candidate	Votes	%	±%
Bloc Québécois	Bernard Bigras	23,315	49.13	+2.10
Liberal	Claude Vignault	16,052	33.83	+1.65
Progressive Conservative	Marc Bissonnette	2,006	4.23	-11.36
Marijuana	Claude Messier	1,486	3.13	
Green	Sébastien Chagnon-Jean	1,475	3.11	
New Democratic	Noémi Lo Pinto	1,417	2.99	-0.31
Alliance	Etienne Morin	1,354	2.85	
Communist	Dorothy Sauras	233	0.49	
Independent	Joanne Pritchard	114	0.24	
Total valid votes		47,526	100.00	

=== Rosemont, 1976 - 2000 ===
1997 Canadian federal election
Party	Candidate	Votes	%	±%
Bloc Québécois	Bernard Bigras	23,313	47.03	-15.92
Liberal	Françoise Guidi	15,952	32.18	+4.73
Progressive Conservative	Marc Bissonnette	7,727	15.59	+10.20
New Democratic	Fidel Fuentes	1,637	3.30	+1.08
Independent	Vicky Mercier	494	1.00	
Marxist–Leninist	Claude Brunel	447	0.90	+0.50
Total valid votes		49,570	100.00	

1993 Canadian federal election
Party	Candidate	Votes	%	±%
Bloc Québécois	Benoît Tremblay	29,414	62.95	
Liberal	Pierre Bourque	12,826	27.45	-1.73
Progressive Conservative	Pauline Vincent	2,519	5.39	-32.45
New Democratic	Roger Lamarre	1,037	2.22	-18.02
Natural Law	Marc Roy	646	1.38	
Marxist–Leninist	Hélène Héroux	189	0.40	
Commonwealth of Canada	Stéphane Lévesque	93	0.20	-0.07
Total valid votes		46,727	100.00	

1988 Canadian federal election
Party	Candidate	Votes	%	±%
Progressive Conservative	Benoît Tremblay	17,127	37.84	-4.4
Liberal	Jacques Guilbault	13,209	29.18	-9.5
New Democratic	Giuseppe Sciortino	9,163	20.24	+9.4
Independent	Suzanne Blais-Grenier	2,060	4.65	
Rhinoceros	Christian Nettoyeur Jolicoeur	1,656	3.66	-0.6
Green	Sylvain Auclair	1,383	3.06	
Communist	Gaétan Trudel	151	0.33	-0.1
Social Credit	Dollard Desjardins	148	0.33	-0.1
Independent	Arnold August	122	0.27	
Independent	Léo Larocque	122	0.27	
Commonwealth of Canada	Christiane Deland-Gervais	120	0.27	+0.1
Total valid votes		45,261	100.00	

1984 Canadian federal election
Party	Candidate	Votes	%	±%
Progressive Conservative	Suzanne Blais-Grenier	15,782	42.2	+35.8
Liberal	Antonio Sciascia	14,477	38.7	-37.1
New Democratic	Roger J.W.D. Lamarre	4,054	10.8	+1.3
Rhinoceros	Francine Rose Lime Lacasse	1,587	4.2	+0.5
Parti nationaliste	Denis Castonguay	1,008	2.7	
Communist	Claude Demers	161	0.4	
Social Credit	Lucien Lapointe	143	0.4	-2.2
Independent	Dollard Desjardins	101	0.3	
Commonwealth of Canada	André Malboeuf	64	0.2	
Total valid votes		37,377	100.0	

1980 Canadian federal election
Party	Candidate	Votes	%	±%
Liberal	Claude-André Lachance	26,544	75.9	+4.9
New Democratic	Marcel Julien	3,337	9.5	+3.9
Progressive Conservative	Léon Vellone	2,260	6.5	-1.4
Rhinoceros	G. Mara Tremblay	1,310	3.7	+0.6
Social Credit	Yvette Gosselin	912	2.6	-7.3
Independent	Jocelyne Lachapelle	199	0.6	
Independent	René Denis	197	0.6	-0.7
Union populaire	Monique Fournier	139	0.4	–
Marxist–Leninist	Francine Tremblay	91	0.3	–
Total valid votes		34,989	100.0	

1979 Canadian federal election
Party	Candidate	Votes	%
Liberal	Claude-André Lachance	28,116	71.0
Social Credit	Emery Whalen	3,919	9.9
Progressive Conservative	Léon Vellone	3,129	7.9
New Democratic	Marcel Julien	2,238	7.9
Rhinoceros	Francine Lévesque	1,248	3.2
Independent	René Denis	509	1.3
Union populaire	André Kishka	167	0.4
Communist	Bernadette Lebrun	156	0.4
Marxist–Leninist	Francine Tremblay	115	0.3
Total valid votes		39,597	100.0

== See also ==
- List of Canadian electoral districts
- Historical federal electoral districts of Canada
