= Phil Edmonston =

Canadian consumer advocate (1944–2022)

Member of Parliament for Chambly
- In office 12 February 1990 – September 8, 1993
- Preceded by: Richard Grisé
- Succeeded by: Ghislain Lebel

Personal details
- Born: Louis-Phillip Edmonston; 26 May 1944 Washington, D.C., U.S.
- Died: 2 December 2022 (aged 78) Panama
- Party: New Democratic Party
- Profession: Consumer advocate, editor, journalist, writer

Louis-Phillip Edmonston (26 May 1944 – 2 December 2022) was a Canadian consumer advocate, writer, journalist, and politician. Along with Andrew Scheer, he was one of the few politicians with dual American and Canadian citizenship to be elected to the Parliament of Canada.

Edmonston was best known for his series of annual Lemon-Aid car guides. He lived in Panama at the end of his life.

== Background ==
Born on 26 May 1944, in Washington, D.C., Edmonston served as a United States Army infantry medic in Panama from 1961 to 1964, where he witnessed the so-called flag riots, and graduated from the Canal Zone College. He subsequently immigrated to Montreal, where he became known as a journalist and consumer advocate.

In journalism, Edmonston worked as a television reporter, a syndicated newspaper columnist, and a host of his own open-line show.

== Consumer advocate ==
In 1968, he founded the Automobile Protection Association (APA), which uncovered and disseminated information about automobile defects and successfully pressured the auto industry for several recalls. Edmonston was president of the APA until 1987. In that role, he worked on thousands of consumer claims against automobile manufacturers and won million-dollar settlements and hundreds of lawsuits for consumers.

His work with the association led to the Lemon-Aid series of car manuals, issued annually since the 1970s.

Edmonston served as a pro bono witness on automobile defects and safety before numerous courts and government committees. In 1982, he testified on inadequate automobile quality and rust protection before the United States Senate Subcommittee on Technology and successfully pressured Ford to become the first automaker to provide a corrosion compensation warranty. In Canada Edmonston's Rusty Ford Owners Group sued Ford and eventually won an agreement with Ford and other automakers as well as the federal government to guarantee cars for five years against perforation.

Edmonston was the author of over 100 best-selling books on consumer rights and the automobile industry.

== Political career ==
Edmonston entered Canadian politics in the 1988 federal election as a candidate for the New Democratic Party (NDP) in Chambly, Quebec, placing second. He won the riding in his second attempt, a 1990 by-election in which he defeated former Quebec cabinet minister Clifford Lincoln, the Liberals' candidate, by almost 20,000 votes, becoming the first member of parliament from Quebec to be elected for the NDP. (Another Quebec MP, Robert Toupin from Terrebonne, had previously crossed the floor to the NDP from the Progressive Conservatives in 1986.)

His relationship with the NDP was at times turbulent. During the 1989 leadership election, he threatened to resign from the party if Dave Barrett became leader. A Quebec nationalist, Edmonston was offended by Barrett's view that western alienation was more important than Quebec's grievances over the Constitution of Canada. Edmonston's differences with the NDP over its position on Canadian federalism and against decentralization and devolving powers to Quebec contributed to his decision not to run for re-election in 1993.

== Personal life and death ==
Edmonston was twice married with a son from his first marriage.

Edmonston died of melanoma in Panama on 2 December 2022, aged 78. There is a Phil Edmonston fonds at Library and Archives Canada.
