= Richard Grisé =

Canadian politician

Richard Grisé (born 15 January 1944 in Saint-Bruno-de-Montarville, Quebec) was a member of the House of Commons of Canada. He was a businessman and life insurance broker by career.

He represented the Quebec riding of Chambly where he was first elected in the 1984 federal election and re-elected in 1988, therefore becoming a member in the 33rd and 34th Canadian Parliaments. He did not seek a third term in the House of Commons.

== Trial and resignation ==
Grisé was a Progressive Conservative member of the House of Commons, but left that party on 18 April 1989 and sat as an independent. He left federal politics entirely after 30 May 1989 following his conviction. Richard Grisé pleaded guilty to 11 counts of corruption, fraud and breach of trust. He was sentenced to one day in jail, $20000 in fines, and probation for three years.

He was replaced by Phil Edmonston following a 12 February 1990 by-election in the riding.

== Second trial ==
In June 1990, MPs Richard Grisé and Gilles Bernier were each charged with four counts of defrauding the House of Commons and breach of trust. While parliamentary rules prevent MPs from hiring members of their own family, they are not prevented from hiring another member's relatives. Grisé and Bernier were accused of having hired each other's children in an attempt to circumvent this rule and provide them with bogus jobs. According to the RCMP, Bernier had ostensibly hired Grisé's son Bruno as a researcher, and in return, Grisé had hired Bernier's sons Gilles junior and Maxime. None of the three sons had done any of the work for which they were hired, though they were generously paid.

In April 1994, Bernier was acquitted. Grisé pleaded guilty to two counts of breach of trust and fined $5000.

Parliament of Canada
Preceded by Raymond Dupont (Liberal)	Member of Parliament for Chambly; 1984–1989	Succeeded by Phil Edmonston (NDP)
