= Georges-C. Lachance =

Canadian politician (1926–2020)

- Official 1974 portrait

Member of Parliament for Lafontaine
- In office June 1962 – May 1974

Personal details
- Born: January 11, 1926 Montreal, Quebec, Canada
- Died: October 10, 2020 (aged 94)
- Party: Liberal
- Relations: Claude-André Lachance, son
- Profession: lawyer

Georges-C. Lachance (11 January 1926 at Montreal, Quebec - 10 October 2020) was a Liberal party member of the House of Commons of Canada. He was a lawyer by career.

He was first elected at the Lafontaine riding in the 1962 general election, then re-elected there in the 1963, 1965, 1968 and 1972 elections. After completing his term in May 1974 for the 29th Canadian Parliament, Lachance left federal office and did not campaign in future federal elections.

Claude-André Lachance, his son, served as a Member of Parliament from 1974 to 1984.
