= Bloc Québécois leadership elections =

Lucien Bouchard, the first leader of the Bloc Québécois, was elected by acclamation by the MPs who formed the Bloc in 1990. When the party held its first convention in April 1995, his leadership was ratified by the delegates.

== 1996 BQ leadership election ==
First Ballot
Candidate	Votes	Percentage
Michel Gauthier	104	67.1%
Francine Lalonde	51	32.9%
Total	155	100%

The Bloc Québécois leadership election in 1996 was an election to replace Lucien Bouchard after he left the Bloc Québécois to become Premier of Quebec. Since the party was actually the Official Opposition during the 35th Canadian Parliament, that meant the winner of the election would become Leader of the Official Opposition.The vote was conducted among members of the party's directorate rather than by all members of the party. Michel Gauthier, who was hardly known in English Canada and even in his native Quebec, surprisingly won the election and became party leader and hense leader of the Official Opposition.

== 1997 BQ leadership election ==
Support by Ballot
Candidate	1st ballot		2nd ballot	
Candidate	Votes cast	%	Votes cast	%
Gilles Duceppe	21,268	43.91%	25,561	52.77%
Yves Duhaime	16,408	33.87%	16,408	33.87%
Rodrigue Biron	6,468	13.35%	6,468	13.35%
Francine Lalonde	2,671	5.51%	Eliminated	
Daniel Turp	1,081	2.23%	Eliminated	
Pierrette Venne	541	1.12%	Eliminated	
Total	48,437	100.0%	48,437	100.0%

The Bloc Québécois leadership election in 1997 was held to elect a replacement for Michel Gauthier. The leadership election was conducted by a one member, one vote (OMOV) process involving all party members. Voters were asked to list their first, second and third choices on the ballot. Since this election was held before the 1997 Canadian federal election, the Bloc was still the Official Opposition in the 35th Canadian Parliament, which meant again the winner of the race would become leader of the Official Opposition. Gilles Duceppe won the leadership election, and became leader of the Official Opposition, albeit briefly as the federal election was called not long after, with Reform replacing the Bloc as the Official Opposition and Reform leader Preston Manning succeeding Duceppe as leader of the Official Opposition.

== 2011 BQ leadership election ==
Support by Ballot
Candidate	1st ballot		2nd ballot	
Candidate	Votes cast	%	Votes cast	%
Daniel Paillé	5,659	44.05%	7,868	61.28%
Maria Mourani	3,613	28.13%	4,972	38.72%
Jean-François Fortin	3,574	27.82%	Eliminated	
Total	12,846	100.0%	12,840	100.0%

Gilles Duceppe resigned as party president and leader immediately after the 2011 federal election in which the Bloc lost 44 of its 47 seats, including Duceppe's. Daniel Paillé was declared the winner of the subsequent leadership election on December 11, 2011, defeating Maria Mourani on the second ballot with 61.28% of the vote. A third candidate, Jean-Francois Fortin, was defeated on the first ballot.

== 2014 BQ leadership election ==
Support by Ballot
Candidate	1st ballot	
Candidate	Votes cast	%
Mario Beaulieu	5,947	53.5%
André Bellavance	5,168	46.5%
Total	11,115	100.0%

In 2014, Mario Beaulieu defeated André Bellavance for the leadership, winning 53.5% of the vote compared to Bellavance's 46.5%.

== 2017 BQ leadership election ==
Following Gilles Duceppe's second resignation after the 2015 federal election, Rhéal Fortin was appointed interim leader.

Martine Ouellet, a member of the Quebec National Assembly and former Parti Québécois cabinet minister and leadership candidate was acclaimed BQ leader on March 18, 2017.

== 2019 BQ leadership election ==
Martine Ouellet resigned on June 11, 2018, after receiving 32% support from a leadership review. Mario Beaulieu was appointed interim leader. Yves-François Blanchet was declared leader in January 2019 after running unopposed for the leadership role.

== See also ==
- Leadership convention
