= Stornoway (residence) =

Official residence of the Leader of the Opposition in Canada

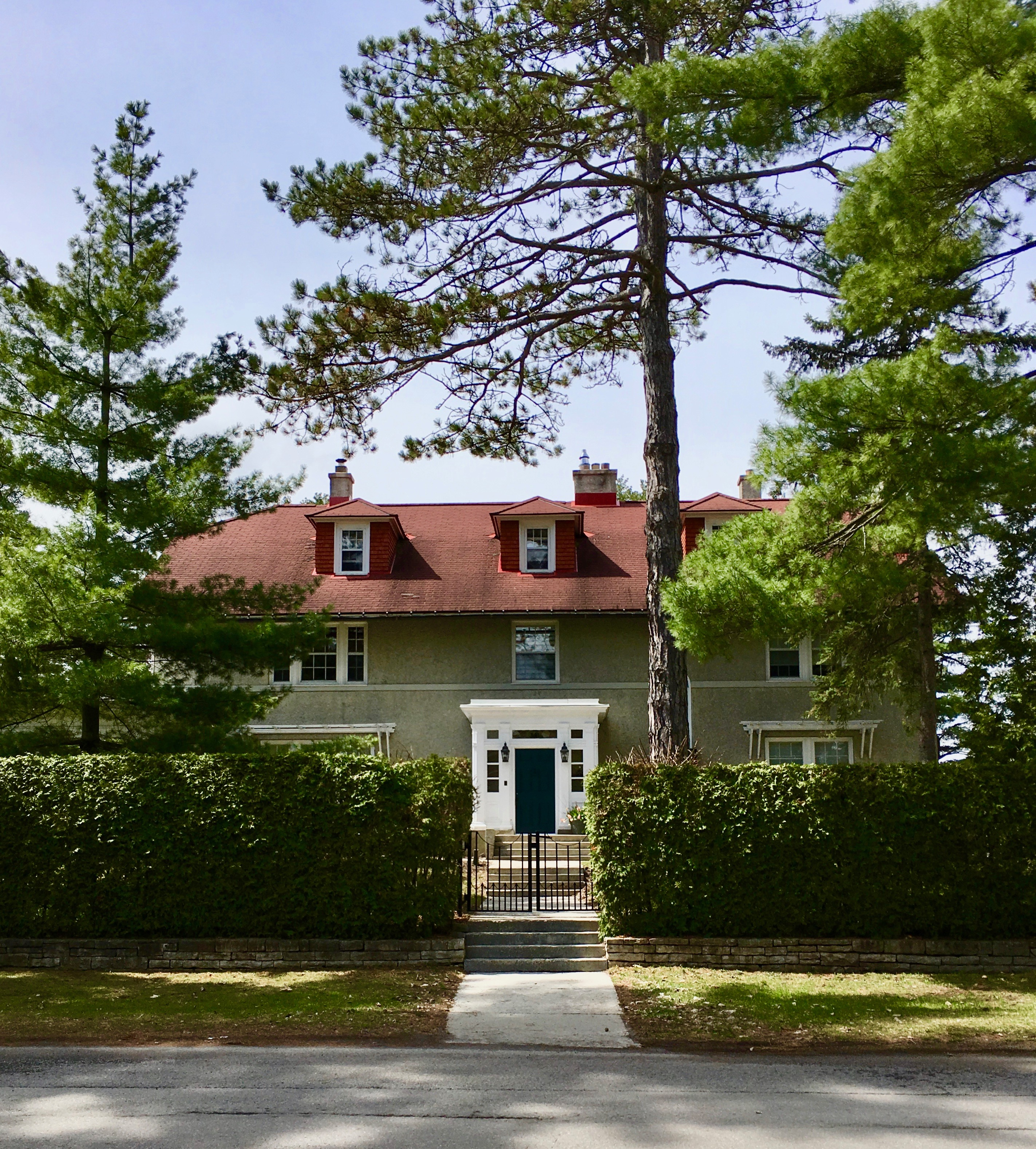
- Exterior facade of Stornoway from the east
- Interactive map of the Stornoway area

General information
- Architectural style: Colonial Revival
- Location: 541 Acacia Avenue, K1M 0M4, Rockcliffe Park; Ottawa, Canada
- Coordinates: 45°27′10″N 75°40′43″W
- Current tenants: Pierre Poilievre, Leader of the Opposition and his family
- Construction started: 1913
- Completed: 1914
- Owner: The King in Right of Canada
- Landlord: National Capital Commission

Design and construction
- Architect: Alan Keefer

Other information
- Number of rooms: 19

Stornoway is the name of the official residence of the leader of the Official Opposition in Canada, and has been used as such since 1950. It is provided in recognition of the opposition leader's position and is located at 541 Acacia Avenue in the Rockcliffe Park area of Ottawa, Ontario. Stornoway has assessed value $4,225,000 (2008) (based on this value, which is only an approximation of the market value, the municipal property taxes are calculated) and is maintained with $70,000 a year in government funds. The National Capital Commission has owned and managed the property since April 1986. The lot size, with a frontage of 228 feet (69 m) and depth of 225 feet (69 m), is slightly irregular.

The property is 5.1 km (3.2 mi) from Ottawa's Parliament Buildings, whereas the prime minister's official residence is only 3.0 km (1.9 mi) away from Parliament. It is located in an area which contains many ambassadorial residences.

== History ==
The house was built by architect Allan Keefer in 1914 for Ottawa grocer Ascanio J. Major and was given the name "Stornoway" by the second occupants, Irvine Gale Perley-Robertson and Ethel Lesa Perley, after the ancestral home of the Perley family in the Outer Hebrides in Scotland.

During the Second World War, from summer 1941 to 1945, Mrs. Perley-Robertson offered Stornoway to (then) Princess Juliana of the Netherlands as a temporary home-in-exile for the Dutch royal family, including the future Queen Beatrix of the Netherlands.

In 1946, journalist and future senator Grattan O'Leary launched a campaign to provide an official residence for the leader of the Official Opposition. He raised money from friends and associates in Ottawa, established a trust fund, and began searching for a suitable property. The Perley-Robertson family offered Stornoway to the trust for the discounted price of $55,000, and it became the opposition leader's residence in 1950, with George A. Drew and his wife as its first official residents. The property was later transferred to the Government of Canada, which has owned it since 1970; the National Capital Commission has managed it since 1988.

Renovations from 2002 to 2006 included an overhaul of the living room and kitchen, repair of the chimney, replacement of carpets, refinishing of hardwood floors, and painting.

== List of residents ==
Completed in 1914, the building had three occupants prior to its acquisition by the Government of Canada. Ascanio Joseph Major, a local grocer, was the first occupant of Stornoway, residing there from 1914 to 1923. In 1923, the Perley-Robertson family acquired the home. From 1941 to 1945, during the Second World War, the Dutch royal family leased the home from the Perley-Robertson family.

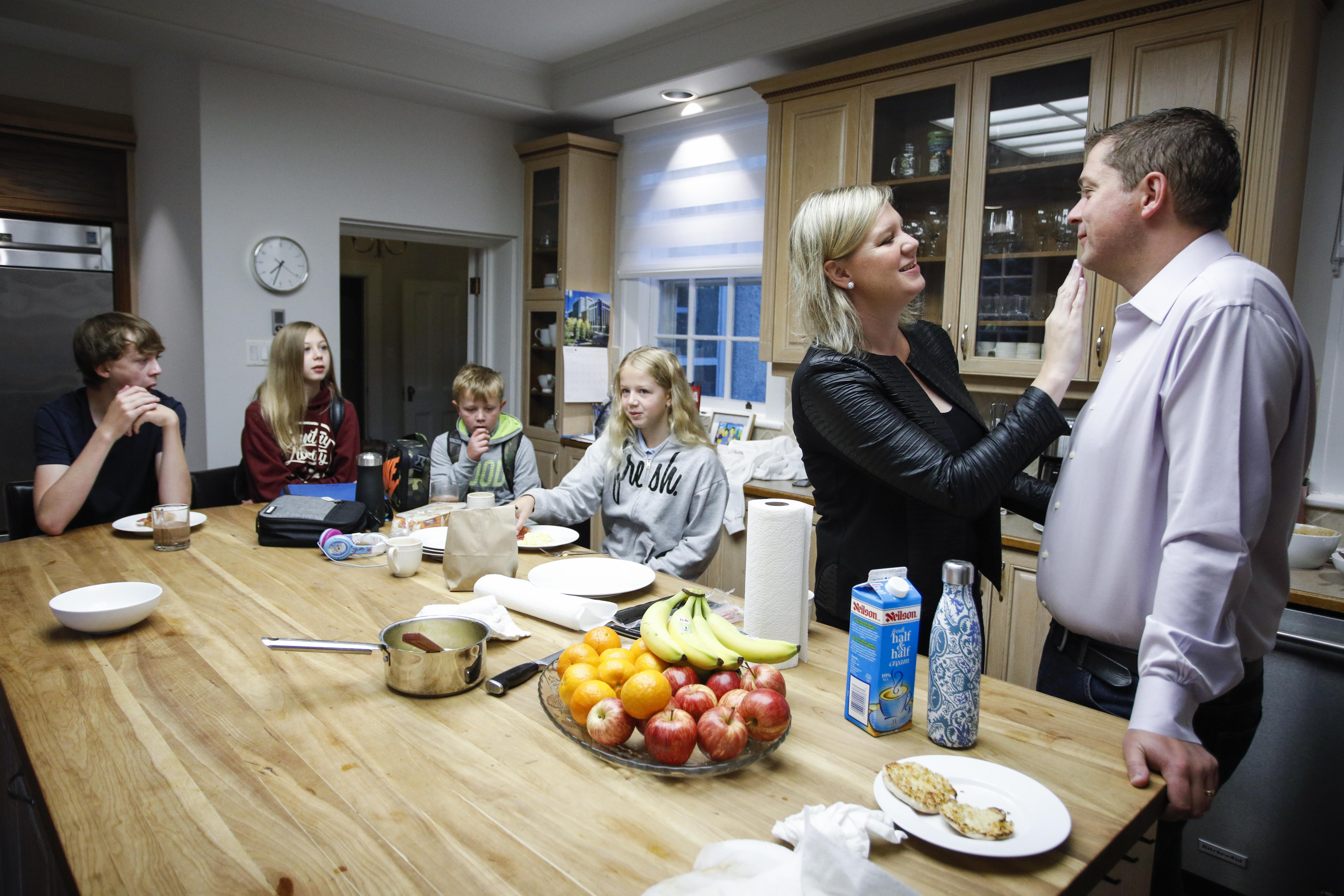
Andrew Scheer (right foreground) with his family in Stornoway's kitchen, September 3, 2019. He served as leader of the Official Opposition from 2017 to 2020, thus residing in Stornoway.

In 1950, the building was acquired by a private trust, and later transferred to the Government of Canada. Since 1950, Stornoway has been used as the official residence of the leader of the official opposition in the House of Commons of Canada. Official opposition leaders (including interim leaders) who resided in Stornoway include:

- George A. Drew: 1950–56 (Note: Drew temporarily stepped down as opposition leader between November 1954 and February 1955 due to illness, but was allowed to remain in the house during this period.)
- Vacant, 1956–58 as William Earl Rowe, John Diefenbaker, and Louis St. Laurent did not use the house during their respective terms as opposition leader.
- Lester B. Pearson: 1958–63
- John Diefenbaker: 1963–67
- Robert Stanfield: 1968–76
- Joe Clark: 1976–79
- Pierre Trudeau: 1979–80
- Joe Clark: 1980–83 (Note: Clark resigned as opposition leader in March 1983 in order to re-run for leadership of the Progressive Conservative Party, but was allowed to continue to live in the house by interim opposition leader Erik Nielsen until his defeat by Brian Mulroney at the 1983 Progressive Conservative leadership election. Nielsen himself did not use the house during the period between Mulroney's victory and entering Parliament via by-election.)
- Brian Mulroney: 1983–84
- John Turner: 1984–90
- Herb Gray: February–December 1990
- Jean Chrétien: 1990–93
- Vacant, 1993–97 as Bloc Québécois leaders Lucien Bouchard, Gilles Duceppe, and Michel Gauthier refused to use the house
- Preston Manning: 1997–2000
- Vacant, March–September 2000, as Deborah Grey did not move into Stornoway.
- Stockwell Day: 2000–01
- John Reynolds: 2001–02
- Stephen Harper: 2002–06 (Note: Harper ceased to be opposition leader in January 2004 following the merger of the Canadian Alliance and Progressive Conservatives into the Conservative Party of Canada, but was allowed to remain in the house with the agreement of interim opposition leader Grant Hill pending the result of the 2004 Conservative Party of Canada leadership election, which Harper won.)
- Bill Graham: February–December 2006
- Stéphane Dion: 2006–08
- Michael Ignatieff: 2008–11
- Jack Layton: May–August 2011
- Nycole Turmel: 2011–12
- Tom Mulcair: 2012–15
- Rona Ambrose: 2015–17
- Andrew Scheer: 2017–20
- Erin O'Toole: 2020–22
- Candice Bergen: February–September 2022
- Pierre Poilievre: 2022–present (Note: Poilievre ceased to be opposition leader in April 2025 after being unseated in the 2025 federal election. Poilievre was allowed to continue to live in the house by interim opposition leader Andrew Scheer until his election to the House in a by-election in August 2025.)

=== Notable absences ===
Although the Bloc Québécois were the official Opposition from 1993 to 1997, party leader Lucien Bouchard declined to move into the residence as a mark of protest against the federal government, choosing instead to live in nearby Gatineau, Quebec. His successors, Gilles Duceppe and Michel Gauthier, likewise did not reside in Stornoway.

Following the 1997 election, when the Reform Party of Canada became the Official Opposition, Reform leader Preston Manning also declined to move in, but for a different reason. Manning protested that Stornoway was too extravagant and a waste of taxpayer money, even joking that it should be used as a bingo hall to pay off the national debt. He asked to be provided with a more "modest" residence, but soon moved into Stornoway after his refusal to do so began to be portrayed in the media as a mark of disrespect for his position as the leader of the Opposition.

Jack Layton, who led the New Democratic Party to official Opposition status in the May 2, 2011 election, moved in a month later, but stated that he would continue to live in Toronto when Parliament was out of session. He died on August 22 of cancer; it was subsequently revealed that Layton and his wife Olivia Chow spent only one night in the house. His interim successor as NDP leader, Nycole Turmel, also did not formally move into the house, though she used Stornoway for entertaining purposes and slept over on occasion.

Of interim party leaders, John Reynolds, Bill Graham, Rona Ambrose, and Candice Bergen are the only interim party leaders to have formally resided at Stornoway.

In the 2025 Canadian federal election, the leader of the Official Opposition, Pierre Poilievre, lost his seat; pursuant to the Official Residences Act, he was no longer entitled to reside at Stornoway. However, he never moved out of the home; Andrew Scheer was appointed opposition leader and allowed Poilievre to remain at Stornoway until he returned to Parliament in a by-election.

== Architecture ==
Stornoway is a 19-room mansion with eight bedrooms, five bathrooms, living room, sitting room (2nd floor), and dining room, and sits on extensive grounds.

Besides the residents in the home, Stornoway is served by a staff of three: a chef, chauffeur, and household administrator. As with 24 Sussex and Rideau Cottage, the public is not allowed to visit Stornoway.

== See also ==
- Rideau Hall
- 24 Sussex Drive
