= Ève Péclet =

Canadian politician (born 1988)

Member of Parliament for La Pointe-de-l'Île
- In office May 2, 2011 – October 19, 2015
- Preceded by: Francine Lalonde
- Succeeded by: Mario Beaulieu

Personal details
- Born: December 3, 1988 (age 37) Montreal, Quebec, Canada
- Party: New Democratic

Ève Péclet (born December 3, 1988) is a Canadian politician who was elected to the House of Commons of Canada in the 2011 election. She represented the electoral district of La Pointe-de-l'Île as a member of the New Democratic Party.

She was a member of the debate team at the Université de Montréal, and is a law school graduate. In February 2011, she appeared in an episode of the reality show Un souper presque parfait (the Quebec version of Come Dine with Me) on the V television network.

She lost her seat in parliament to Bloc Québécois candidate Mario Beaulieu in Canada's 42nd general election in 2015. She was again defeated in the 2019, 2021, and 2025 federal elections.

== Electoral record ==
2025 Canadian federal election: Outremont
Party	Candidate	Votes	%	±%
Liberal	Rachel Bendayan	26,024	55.20	+10.84
Conservative	Ronan Reich	5,911	12.54	+5.23
Bloc Québécois	Rémi Lebeuf	5,644	11.97	−3.47
New Democratic	Ève Péclet	5,024	10.66	−16.64
Green	Jonathan Pedneault	4,539	9.63	+6.51
Total valid votes		47,142	98.73	
Total rejected ballots		606	1.27	+0.08
Turnout		47,748	62.34	+5.46
Eligible voters		76,592		
Liberal notional hold		Swing		+2.81
Source: Elections Canada

2021 Canadian federal election: Outremont
Party	Candidate	Votes	%	±%	Expenditures
Liberal	Rachel Bendayan	16,714	45.39	-0.80	$74,361.58
New Democratic	Ève Péclet	9,579	26.02	+5.95	$25,871.29
Bloc Québécois	Célia Grimard	5,535	15.03	+1.18	$10,443.22
Conservative	Jasmine Louras	2,882	7.83	+1.30	none listed
Green	Grace Tarabey	1,198	3.25	-8.58	$1,719.40
People's	Yehuda Pinto	819	2.22	+1.33	1,871.20
Independent	Angela-Angie Joshi	93	0.25	N/A	$3,516.54
Total valid votes/expense limit		36,820	98.8	–	$104,612.20
Total rejected ballots		456	1.2		
Turnout		37,276	57.2	-5.0	
Eligible voters		65,143			
Liberal hold		Swing		-3.38	
Source: Elections Canada

2019 Canadian federal election: La Pointe-de-l'Île
Party	Candidate	Votes	%	±%	Expenditures
Bloc Québécois	Mario Beaulieu	26,010	46.84	+13.26	$38,017.09
Liberal	Jonathan Plamondon	16,898	30.43	+1.86	$50,221.87
New Democratic	Ève Péclet	6,057	10.91	-15.85	$6,545.53
Conservative	Robert Coutu	3,984	7.17	-0.81	$25,219.21
Green	Franco Fiori	1,910	3.44		none listed
People's	Randy Manseau	388	0.70		none listed
Indépendance du Québec	Jacinthe Lafrenaye	199	0.4		$636.28
Marxist–Leninist	Geneviève Royer	88	0.2		$0.00
Total valid votes/expense limit		55,534	100.0		
Total rejected ballots		1,141			
Turnout		56,675	66.2		
Eligible voters		85,589			
Bloc Québécois hold		Swing		+5.70	
Source: Elections Canada

2015 Canadian federal election: La Pointe-de-l'Île
Party	Candidate	Votes	%	±%	Expenditures
Bloc Québécois	Mario Beaulieu	18,545	33.58	+1.21	$48,190.59
Liberal	Marie-Chantale Simard	15,777	28.57	+18.47	$5,384.21
New Democratic	Ève Péclet	14,777	26.76	-20.77	$51,626.51
Conservative	Guy Morissette	4,408	7.98	+0.33	$4,736.10
Green	David J. Cox	1,130	2.05	+0.16	–
Rhinoceros	Ben 97 Benoit	358	0.65	–	$1,062.19
Strength in Democracy	Jean-François Larose	135	0.24	–	–
Marxist–Leninist	Geneviève Royer	96	0.17	–	–
Total valid votes/expense limit		55,226	100.00		$222,699.43
Total rejected ballots		912	1.62	–	
Turnout		56,138	65.43	–	
Eligible voters		84,507			
Bloc Québécois gain from New Democratic		Swing		+10.99	
Source: Elections Canada

2011 Canadian federal election: La Pointe-de-l'Île
Party	Candidate	Votes	%	±%	Expenditures
New Democratic	Ève Péclet	23,033	48.34	+35.44	none listed
Bloc Québécois	Ginette Beaudry	15,475	32.48	−23.61	$75,555
Liberal	Olivier L. Coulombe	4,369	9.17	−6.82	$4,159
Conservative	Mathieu Drolet	3,664	7.69	−3.49	$4,500
Green	David J. Cox	898	1.89	−1.00	$125
Marxist–Leninist	Claude Brunelle	213	0.45		none listed
Total valid votes/expense limit		47,652	100.0		
Total rejected ballots		813	1.68		
Turnout		48,465	60.43	+0.97	
Eligible voters		80,201			
Sources: Official Results, Elections Canada and Financial Returns, Elections Canada.
