= Clément Robitaille =

Canadian politician (1873–1932)

Member of the Canadian Parliament for Maisonneuve
- In office 1921–1932
- Preceded by: Rodolphe Lemieux
- Succeeded by: Joseph Jean

Personal details
- Born: 30 June 1873 Saint-Sulpice, Quebec
- Died: 16 January 1932 (aged 58) Montreal, Quebec
- Party: Liberal
- Spouse(s): Rosina Giard m. 1 May 1906
- Profession: Lawyer

Clément Robitaille (French pronunciation: [klemɑ̃ ʁɔbitaj]; 30 June 1873 – 16 January 1932) was a Liberal party member of the House of Commons of Canada. He was born in Saint-Sulpice, Quebec and became a lawyer.

Robitaille attended Université Laval where he received his law degree, then was called to the bar in 1899.

He was first elected to Parliament at the Maisonneuve riding in the 1921 general election. He was re-elected there in 1925, 1926 and 1930.

Robitaille died in Montreal on 16 January 1932 before completing his term in the 17th Canadian Parliament.
