= Mercier (federal electoral district) =

Former federal electoral district in Quebec, Canada

Quebec electoral district

Defunct federal electoral district
- Legislature: House of Commons
- District created: 1933
- District abolished: 2003
- First contested: 1935
- Last contested: 2000

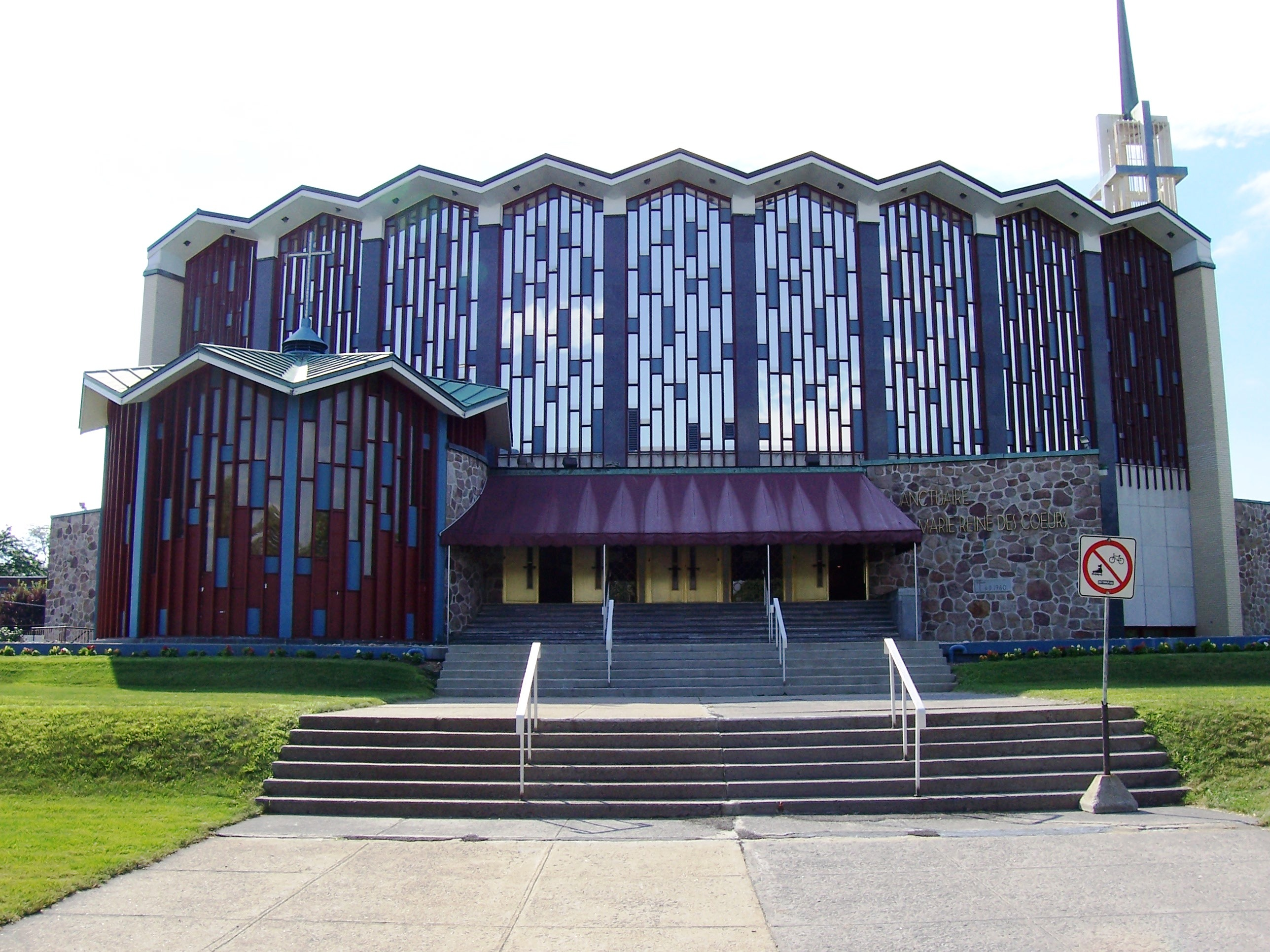
Sanctuaire Marie-Reine-des-Cœurs, located on Sherbrooke East street, was part of the electoral district.

Mercier (French pronunciation: [mɛʁsje]; also known as Montreal—Mercier) was a federal electoral district in Quebec, Canada, that was represented in the House of Commons of Canada from 1935 to 2004. In 2003, the district was abolished and split into the La Pointe-de-l'Île and Honoré-Mercier ridings. A provincial electoral district still exists under the same name but is located in Plateau Mont-Royal borough.

== History ==
Mercier riding was created in 1933 from Laval—Two Mountains and Maisonneuve ridings.

It initially consisted of:

- parts of the city of Montreal;
- the towns of Montreal North, St-Michel-de-Laval, St-Léonard-de-Port-Maurice, Montreal East, Pointe-aux-Trembles;
- the parishes of Rivière-des-Prairies, St-Léonard-de-Port-Maurice, and St-Jean-de-Dieu Asylum; and * the municipality of Pont-Viau and the town of Laval-des-Rapides in Laval county..

In 1966, it was defined as consisting of:

- the City of Pointe-aux-Trembles;
- the Towns of Anjou and Montreal East;
- the part of the City of Montreal bounded by Saint-Donat Street, the Towns of Anjou and Montreal East, and Saint-Lawrence River;
- the part of the City of Montreal bounded by the Cities of Pointeaux-Trembles and Montreal North, the Towns of Anjou and Montreal East, and Des Prairies River.

In 1976, it was defined as consisting of:

- the City of Pointe-aux-Trembles;
- the Town of Montreal East;
- the part of the City of Montreal bounded by the Cities of Pointeaux-Trembles and Montreal North, by the Towns of Anjou and Montreal East and by des Prairies River;
- the part of the City of Montreal bounded by a line commencing from the Saint Lawrence River along Saint-Donat Street, the Canadian National Railway; the northeastern limit of the parish municipality of Saint-Jean-de-Dieu, Sherbrooke Street East, Highway 25, the limits of the towns of Anjou and Montreal East to the Saint Lawrence River.

In 1980, it was renamed "Montreal—Mercier". In 1987, Montreal—Mercier was split into Anjou—Rivière-Des-Prairies and a re-created Mercier riding. The new Mercier riding also incorporated territory from Gamelin riding.

The new Mercier riding consisted of:

- the Town of Montréal-Est;
- parts of the City of Montréal.

The district was abolished in 2003 when it was split into La Pointe-de-l'Île and Honoré-Mercier ridings.

== Members of Parliament ==
This riding elected the following members of Parliament:

Parliament	Years	Member	Party
Mercier; Riding created from Laval—Two Mountains and Maisonneuve
18th	1935–1940	Joseph Jean	Liberal
19th	1940–1945	Joseph Jean	Liberal
20th	1945–1949	Joseph Jean	Liberal
21st	1949–1949	Joseph Jean	Liberal
21st	1949–1953	Marcel Monette	Liberal
22nd	1953–1957	Marcel Monette	Liberal
23rd	1957–1958	Marcel Monette	Liberal
24th	1958–1962	André Gillet	Progressive Conservative
25th	1962–1963	Prosper Boulanger	Liberal
26th	1963–1965	Prosper Boulanger	Liberal
27th	1965–1968	Prosper Boulanger	Liberal
28th	1968–1972	Prosper Boulanger	Liberal
29th	1972–1974	Prosper Boulanger	Liberal
30th	1974–1979	Prosper Boulanger	Liberal
31st	1979–1980	Céline Hervieux-Payette	Liberal
32nd	1980–1984	Céline Hervieux-Payette	Liberal
Montreal—Mercier
33rd	1984–1988	Carole Jacques	Progressive Conservative
Mercier
34th	1988–1993	Carole Jacques	Progressive Conservative
35th	1993–1997	Francine Lalonde	Bloc Québécois
36th	1997–2000	Francine Lalonde	Bloc Québécois
37th	2000–2004	Francine Lalonde	Bloc Québécois
Riding dissolved into La Pointe-de-l'Île and Honoré-Mercier

== Election results ==
=== Mercier, 1933–1980 ===
1935 Canadian federal election
Party	Candidate	Votes
Liberal	Joseph Jean	17,231
Reconstruction	Évariste Forest	3,750
Conservative	Robert Irving Green	2,496
Independent Reconstruction	Paul-Antoine Bonhomme	865

1940 Canadian federal election
Party	Candidate	Votes
Liberal	Joseph Jean	19,134
National Government	François-Eugène Therrien	4,596

1945 Canadian federal election
Party	Candidate	Votes
Liberal	Joseph Jean	18,623
Bloc populaire	Fernand Chaussé	9,033
Progressive Conservative	Hervé Brien	2,269
Independent	Oscar Bélisle	542
Co-operative Commonwealth	Marie-Ange Gill	541
Social Credit	Hervé Lajeunesse	417
Liberal–Labour	Ernest Larin	345

1949 Canadian federal election
Party	Candidate	Votes
Liberal	Joseph Jean	17,041
Progressive Conservative	Roméo Mcduff	7,786
Union des électeurs	Maurice Lajeunesse	1,587

By-election on 24 October 1949 On Jean's acceptance of an office of emolument under the Crown, 24 August 1949
Party	Candidate	Votes
Liberal	Marcel Monette	9,389
Independent Liberal	Wilfrid Latraverse	2,028
Independent	Léon Bertrand	1,125

1953 Canadian federal election
Party	Candidate	Votes
Liberal	Marcel Monette	17,479
Progressive Conservative	Roméo Mcduff	9,352
Co-operative Commonwealth	Joseph-S.-Léo Tremblay	885
Labor–Progressive	Réal Couillard	513

1957 Canadian federal election
Party	Candidate	Votes
Liberal	Marcel Monette	30,024
Progressive Conservative	François Coron	10,093

1958 Canadian federal election
Party	Candidate	Votes
Progressive Conservative	André Gillet	26,463
Liberal	Marcel Monette	23,103
Co-operative Commonwealth	Gisèle Couture	2,219
Radical chrétien	Georges Rousseau	687

1962 Canadian federal election
Party	Candidate	Votes
Liberal	Prosper Boulanger	28,898
Progressive Conservative	André Gillet	19,925
Social Credit	Maurice Lajeunesse	11,680
New Democratic	Gaston Caron	7,491
Independent	Stéphane Bugeaud	1,621

1963 Canadian federal election
Party	Candidate	Votes
Liberal	Prosper Boulanger	33,450
Social Credit	Maurice Lajeunesse	19,577
Progressive Conservative	André Gillet	15,130
New Democratic	Gérard Picard	11,606

1965 Canadian federal election
Party	Candidate	Votes
Liberal	Prosper Boulanger	39,205
Progressive Conservative	André Gillet	16,598
New Democratic	Florent Paquette	15,206
Ralliement créditiste	Maurice Lajeunesse	11,365
Independent Liberal	René Morin	1,708

1968 Canadian federal election
Party	Candidate	Votes
Liberal	Prosper Boulanger	19,077
Progressive Conservative	Raymond Daniel	10,571
New Democratic	Lucette Bernier	3,041
Ralliement créditiste	Joseph Bélanger	3,011
Independent	Zotique Duchaine	888

1972 Canadian federal election
Party	Candidate	Votes
Liberal	Prosper Boulanger	22,207
Social Credit	Cyprien Dion	11,468
Progressive Conservative	André St-Onge	9,010
New Democratic	Mario Hart	4,921

1974 Canadian federal election
Party	Candidate	Votes
Liberal	Prosper Boulanger	22,545
Progressive Conservative	Lucien Grenier	7,026
Social Credit	Cyprien Dion	6,255
New Democratic	Jacques Milot	4,137
Communist	Serge Da Sylva	278
Marxist–Leninist	Gilles Robillard	200

1979 Canadian federal election
Party	Candidate	Votes
Liberal	Céline Hervieux-Payette	26,784
Social Credit	Lise Lajeunesse	10,328
Progressive Conservative	Jacques Coutu	5,076
New Democratic	Elizabeth Chase-Chapdelaine	1,816
Rhinoceros	Guy Caron	1,074
Communist	Montserrat Escola	135
Union populaire	Jean-Guy Martel	121
Marxist–Leninist	Serge Patenaude	118

1980 Canadian federal election
Party	Candidate	Votes
Liberal	Céline Hervieux-Payette	27,428
New Democratic	Pierre Dubé	4,258
Progressive Conservative	Jacques Coutu	3,161
Social Credit	Claude Bélanger	1,891
Rhinoceros	Piggy Guy De Blois	1,835
Union populaire	Martine Godard	161
Marxist–Leninist	Michel Claveau	146

=== Montreal—Mercier, 1981–1987 ===
1984 Canadian federal election
Party	Candidate	Votes
Progressive Conservative	Carole Jacques	25,071
Liberal	Céline Hervieux-Payette	19,335
New Democratic	Robert Ferland	4,925
Parti nationaliste	Gérald Giguère	2,557
Rhinoceros	Raymond les oreilles Pollender	2,038
Commonwealth of Canada	Michel Destroismaisons	154

=== Mercier, 1987–2003 ===
1988 Canadian federal election
Party	Candidate	Votes
Progressive Conservative	Carole Jacques	30,804
Liberal	Luc Chouinard	12,942
New Democratic	André Cordeau	10,251
Rhinoceros	Jean-Claude Stardust Gouin	1,617
Communist	André Cloutier	309
Independent	Jean-Pierre Ginchereau	197
Commonwealth of Canada	Denise Saint-Louis,	137

1993 Canadian federal election
Party	Candidate	Votes
Bloc Québécois	Francine Lalonde	34,139
Liberal	Magda Tadros	11,700
Independent	Carole Jacques	8,992
Progressive Conservative	Gérald Lacoste	2,720
New Democratic	Guy D'Amours,	789
Abolitionist	William-John Apostol	207
Commonwealth of Canada	Pierre Aylwin	128

1997 Canadian federal election
Party	Candidate	Votes
Bloc Québécois	Francine Lalonde	24,649
Liberal	René Bourgeault	14,061
Progressive Conservative	Eric Champagne	8,500
New Democratic	Cathy Milner	772
Marxist–Leninist	Hélène Héroux	297

2000 Canadian federal election
Party	Candidate	Votes
Bloc Québécois	Francine Lalonde	24,755
Liberal	Normand Biron	15,416
Green	Richard Savignac	1,813
Alliance	J. Marc-Antoine Delsoin	1,685
Progressive Conservative	Martin Gelgoot	1,629
Marijuana	Eric Duquette	936
New Democratic	Nicholas Vikander	480
Marxist–Leninist	Geneviève Royer	104

== See also ==
- List of Canadian electoral districts
- Historical federal electoral districts of Canada
