= Céline Hervieux-Payette =

Canadian politician

The Honourable Céline Hervieux-Payette PC
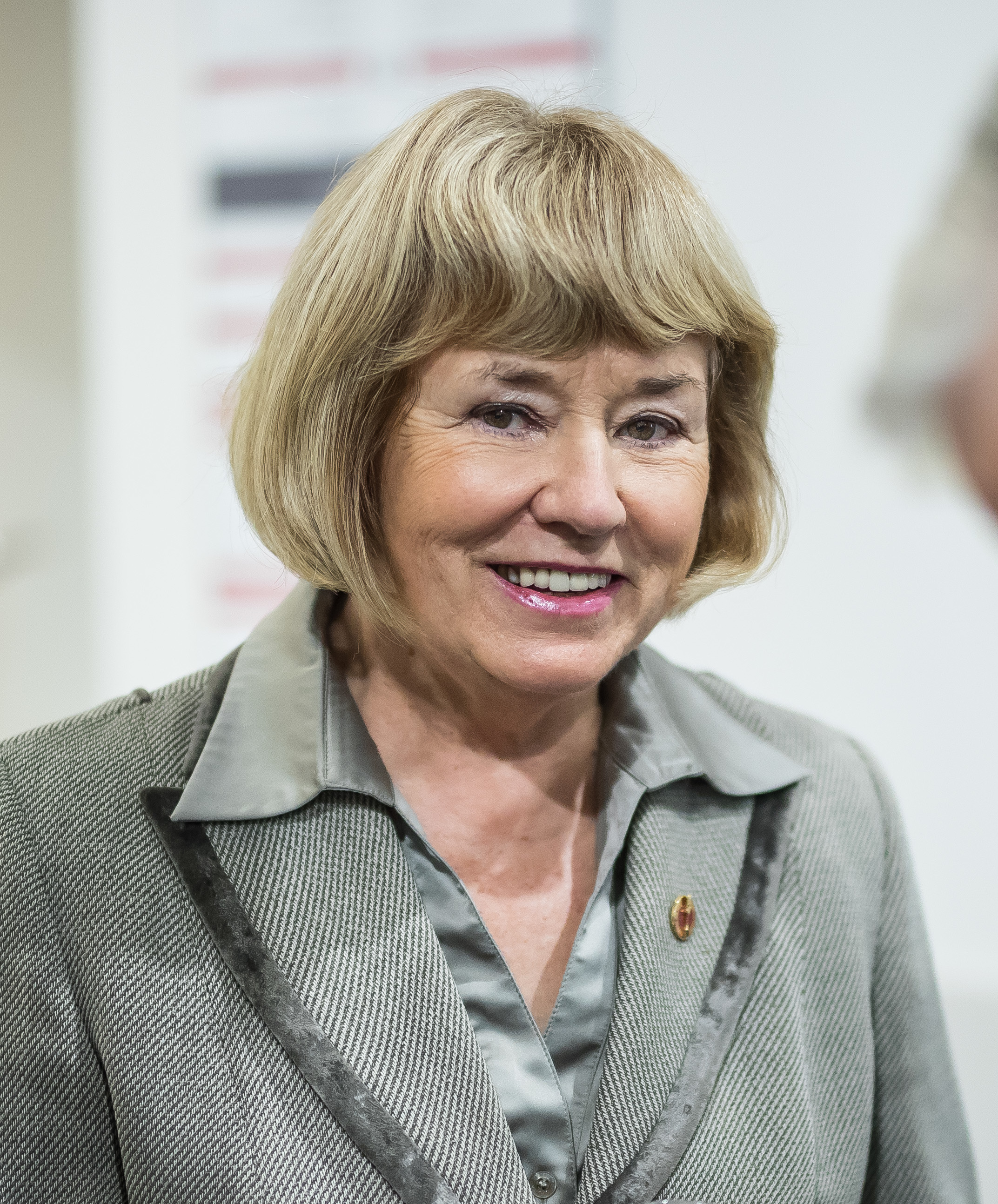

Leader of the Opposition in the Senate
- In office January 18, 2007 – November 3, 2008
- Appointed by: Stéphane Dion
- Preceded by: Dan Hays
- Succeeded by: Jim Cowan

Canadian Senator from Quebec
- In office March 21, 1995 – April 22, 2016
- Appointed by: Jean Chrétien
- Preceded by: Paul David
- Succeeded by: Rosa Galvez

Member of Parliament for Mercier
- In office May 22, 1979 – September 3, 1984
- Preceded by: Prosper Boulanger
- Succeeded by: Carole Jacques

Personal details
- Born: April 22, 1941 (age 84) L'Assomption, Quebec, Canada
- Party: Liberal (until 2014); Independent Liberal (2014-present)
- Cabinet: Minister of State (Fitness and Amateur Sport) (1983–1984); Minister of State (Youth) (1984)
- Portfolio: Parliamentary Secretary to the Solicitor General of Canada (1980–1982); Leader of the Opposition in the Senate (2007–2008)

Céline Hervieux-Payette PC (born April 22, 1941) is a former Canadian senator who served as the Leader of the Opposition in the Senate of Canada from 2007 to 2008, the first woman to hold this position. She was previously a Liberal member of Parliament from 1979 to 1984 and a cabinet minister in the government of Pierre Trudeau in the 1980s. She retired from the Senate on April 22, 2016, upon reaching the mandatory retirement age of 75.

== Career ==
In the 1970s, Hervieux-Payette served as a political aide to the Quebec government of Premier Robert Bourassa. She also served as an administrator, as president and commissioner of the Le Gardeur School Board, and as director of public relations for Steinberg Inc., a Quebec grocery and department store business.

Hervieux-Payette was first elected to the House of Commons of Canada in the 1979 election as the Liberal Member of Parliament for Mercier. She was re-elected in the 1980 election and became parliamentary secretary to the Solicitor General of Canada. In 1983, she was appointed by Prime Minister Pierre Trudeau to the Canadian Cabinet as Minister of State (Fitness and Amateur Sport). She then served as Minister of State (Youth) from January to June 1984.

She was not appointed to the Cabinet of John Turner, who succeeded Trudeau as Liberal leader and prime minister in June 1984. She stood as a candidate in the 1984 election but was defeated.

She returned to the private sector and served as vice president of business ventures at the SNC Group, an engineering and manufacturing firm, from 1985 to 1989. From 1991 to 1995, she was vice president of Regulatory and Legal Affairs for Fonorola Inc., a telecommunications firm. She began working as a counsellor for Fasken Martineau DuMoulin in 1995.

Hervieux-Payette attempted to re-enter the House of Commons in the 1988 and 1993 elections but was defeated in both attempts. In 1995, she returned to Parliament when she was appointed to the Senate of Canada by Jean Chrétien.

On January 18, 2007, Hervieux-Payette was appointed Leader of the Opposition in the Senate by Liberal leader Stéphane Dion, whom she had supported during the leadership race. She also became Quebec lieutenant for Stéphane Dion on October 16, 2007.

On November 3, 2008, she was succeeded as Leader of the Opposition by Jim Cowan.

On October 30, 2014, she tabled Bill S-224 to propose a National Seal and Seafood Products Day. The Bill, renamed An Act respecting National Seal Products Day, under the number S-208, proposed May 20 as a national day to celebrate Canadian seal products. The Bill finally was adopted by both the Senate and the House of Commons and received the Royal Assent on May 16, 2017, becoming a Canadian law

On June 11, 2015, she tabled Bill S-231 An Act to amend the Firearms Act, the Criminal Code and the Defence Production Act, which would have changed a number of provisions for private ownership of firearms. The bill died on the order paper on August 2, 2015, when Parliament was dissolved.

On April 12, 2016, ten days before her mandatory retirement date, she tabled Bill S-223 'An Act to amend the Firearms Act and the Criminal Code and to make consequential changes to other Acts', which revisited many of the same measures in the previous Bill S-231.

== Views ==
Hervieux-Payette became involved in controversy in March 2006 when she responded to an American couple's letter to all Canadian Senators protesting the annual seal hunt in Newfoundland. The American, Anne McLellan, told Canadian television channel, CTV Television Network, that her family cancelled plans to vacation in Canada, describing the seal hunt as "appalling".

In her responding letter, Hervieux-Payette wrote that what she finds horrible is "the daily massacre of innocent people in Iraq, the execution of prisoners – mainly blacks – in American prisons, the massive sale of handguns to Americans, and the destabilization of the entire world by the American government's aggressive foreign policy, etc."

She later clarified her remarks, arguing that Americans should worry about their own country's behaviour before pointing fingers at other nations. Bill Graham, leader of the Liberal official opposition, subsequently issued a statement saying that the letter "reflect her personal opinions and not those of the Liberal Party of Canada."

On April 23, 2009, Hervieux-Payette unveiled the Universal Declaration on the Ethical Harvest of Seals, seeking support from countries, NGO's and scientists to establish universal standards on seal harvest.

On May 28, 2015, Hervieux-Payette sent an email to the Speaker of the Senate, the Speaker of the House of Commons, all senators, and all members of Parliament complaining about the presence of armed police officers at the doors into the Senate. She stated, "In my opinion, it is a serious mistake to arm police officers with these weapons. No matter what, the first victims of an attack will probably be police officers, because people who wish to do harm do not give advance notice. Security that relies on firepower has proven to be ineffective, and millions of Americans have paid the price for this false assumption with their lives." The letter went on to conclude that because the attacker on October 22 was killed by the Sergeant at Arms and not the police, the presence of armed police was therefore unnecessary.

== Electoral record (incomplete) ==
1988 Canadian federal election: Laval
Party	Candidate	Votes	%	±%
Progressive Conservative	Guy Ricard (incumbent)	26,858	49.11	
Liberal	Céline Hervieux-Payette	18,819	34.41	
New Democratic	Paul Cappon	8,546	15.63	
Commonwealth of Canada	Mario Ouellet	468	0.86	
Total valid votes		54,691	100.00	–
Total rejected ballots		1,331	–	–
Turnout		56,022	79.25	–
Electors on the lists		70,688	–	–
Source: Report of the Chief Electoral Officer, Thirty-fourth General Election, 1988.

Government offices
Preceded by Dan Hays	Leader of the Opposition in the Senate of Canada; 2007–2008	Succeeded by Jim Cowan
Party political offices
Preceded by Marcel Proulx	Quebec lieutenant for the Leader of the Liberal Party; 2008–2009	Succeeded by Denis Coderre
