= André Gillet =

Canadian politician

Member of Parliament for Mercier
- In office March 1958 – June 1962
- Preceded by: Marcel Monette
- Succeeded by: Prosper Boulanger

Personal details
- Born: 3 November 1916
- Died: 29 June 1993 (aged 76) Montreal, Quebec, Canada
- Party: Progressive Conservative
- Spouse: Margaret Ouellette
- Profession: administrator, builder, contractor

André Gillet (3 November 1916 – 29 June 1993) was a Canadian businessman and politician. Gillet was a Progressive Conservative party member of the House of Commons of Canada. He was an administrator, builder and contractor by career.

He was first elected at the Mercier riding in the 1958 general election. After serving his only federal term, the 24th Canadian Parliament, he was defeated at Mercier by Prosper Boulanger of the Liberal Party in the 1962 election. Gillet's further attempts to unseat Boulanger in the 1963 and 1965 elections were likewise unsuccessful.
