= Marcel Monette =

Canadian politician

Member of the Canadian Parliament for Mercier
- In office October 1949 – March 1958
- Preceded by: Joseph Jean
- Succeeded by: André Gillet

Personal details
- Born: 28 January 1895 Saint-Édouard-de-Napierville, Quebec, Canada
- Died: 17 January 1966 (aged 70)
- Party: Liberal
- Profession: Baker

Marcel Monette (28 January 1895 – 17 January 1966) was a Liberal party member of the House of Commons of Canada. He was born in Saint-Édouard-de-Napierville, Quebec and became a baker by career.

He was first elected at the Mercier riding in a 1949 by-election. Monette was re-elected to successive terms in 1953 and 1957 then defeated in 1958 by André Gillet of the Progressive Conservative party.
