= Leader of the Official Opposition (Canada) =

Position in the Parliament of Canada

- Chef de l'Opposition officielle
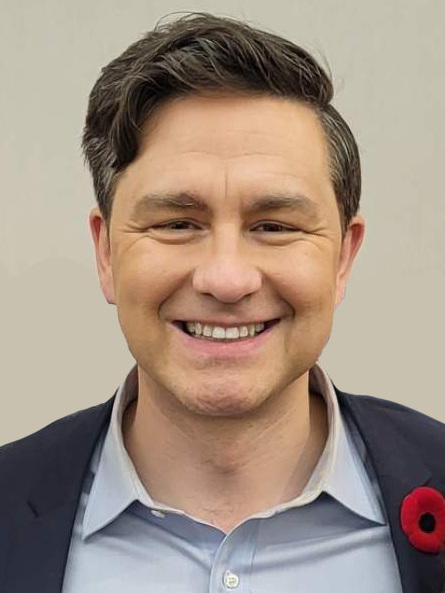
- Incumbent; Pierre Poilievre since August 18, 2025
- Official Opposition; Official Opposition Shadow Cabinet; Parliament of Canada
- Style: The Honourable
- Member of: House of Commons
- Residence: Stornoway
- Seat: West Block (while Centre Block is under renovation)
- Term length: While leader of the largest party not in government
- Inaugural holder: Alexander Mackenzie
- Formation: March 6, 1873
- Salary: $321,300 (2026)

The leader of the Official Opposition (French: chef de l'Opposition officielle) is the member of Parliament (MP) who leads the Official Opposition in Canada. This is typically the leader of the party possessing the most seats in the House of Commons that is neither the governing party nor part of a governing coalition.

Pierre Poilievre, MP for Battle River—Crowfoot, has been the leader of the Official Opposition since August 2025. Poilievre previously served in the role from September 2022 until April 2025, when he lost his seat in Carleton in the 2025 federal election. He was elected to his current seat in an August by-election, once again becoming leader of the Opposition.

The office should not be confused with Opposition House leader, who is a frontbencher charged with managing the business of the Opposition in the House of Commons and is formally titled Leader of the Opposition in the House of Commons. There is also a leader of the Opposition in the Senate, who is usually of the same party as the leader of the Opposition in the house.

== Name ==
The term leader of the opposition is used in the Parliament of Canada Act and the Standing Orders of the House of Commons, as is the term official opposition. The terms leader of the loyal opposition, his majesty's opposition, and loyal opposition are sometimes used, but are not in either the act or the standing orders. The word loyal is used to communicate the party's loyalty to monarch of Canada – as the nonpartisan personification of the nation and the state's authority – even as its members oppose the governing party.

== Privileges ==
The leader of the Opposition is entitled to the same levels of pay and protection as a Cabinet minister and is often made a member of the King's Privy Council, generally the only non-government member of the House of Commons afforded that privilege. The leader of the Opposition is entitled to reside at the official residence of Stornoway and ranks thirteenth on the Order of Precedence, after Cabinet ministers and before lieutenant governors of the provinces. In the House of Commons seating plan, the leader of the Opposition sits directly across from the prime minister.

== History ==
During the 1st Canadian Parliament, the position of the leader of the opposition was not clearly established. The Liberal Party sat on the opposition benches, but it remained a loose coalition of various interests and chose not to name a leader until becoming a more united group. Several historians note that John Sandfield Macdonald was granted the seat reserved for the Opposition leader, though he was an ally of John A. Macdonald (Note: The two Macdonalds were of no relation.) and the two had campaigned together in the preceding election. As Sandfield Macdonald was concurrently Premier of Ontario, (Note: Sandfield Macdonald was a member of both the House of Commons of Canada and the Legislative Assembly of Ontario; dual mandates had not yet been abolished.) he did not play a major role in holding the government to account. Instead, Alexander Mackenzie emerged as a prominent opponent of the government, with some historians describing him as the de facto leader of the Opposition from 1869. Mackenzie was recognized as Leader of the Opposition in 1873, after formally assuming the leadership of the Liberal Party.

Despite its importance in the Westminster system, the role was not enshrined in law until 1905. In proposing the measure, Prime Minister Wilfrid Laurier said "the leader of the opposition under our system is just as much a part of the constitutional system of government as the Prime Minister himself." The leader was also granted a $7,000 allowance, per session, in addition to his salary as MP. According to Dean E. Henry, this "made Canada the first entity in the British Empire, probably the first in the world, to pay a state salary to an opposition leader."

Two leaders of the Opposition have died in office: Wilfrid Laurier in 1919 and Jack Layton in 2011.

== Leaders of the Official Opposition ==
Liberal Party of Canada
Liberal-Conservative Party, Conservative Party of Canada (1867–1942), Progressive Conservative Party of Canada
Bloc Québécois
Reform Party of Canada
Canadian Alliance
Conservative Party of Canada
New Democratic Party

Portrait	Name Electoral district (Birth–Death)	Term of office		Party	Prime minister Party
Portrait	Name Electoral district (Birth–Death)	Term start	Term end	Party	Prime minister Party
	Alexander Mackenzie; MP for Lambton (1822–1892)	March 6, 1873	November 5, 1873	Liberal	Sir John A. Macdonald; Liberal-Conservative
	Sir John A. Macdonald; MP for Kingston (1815–1891)	November 6, 1873	October 16, 1878	Liberal-Conservative	Alexander Mackenzie; Liberal
	Alexander Mackenzie; MP for Lambton (1822–1892)	October 17, 1878	April 27, 1880	Liberal	Sir John A. Macdonald; Liberal-Conservative
Vacant; April 27 – May 3, 1880					Sir John A. Macdonald; Liberal-Conservative
	Edward Blake; MP for Durham West (1833–1912)	May 4, 1880	June 2, 1887	Liberal	Sir John A. Macdonald; Liberal-Conservative
Vacant; June 3 – 22, 1887					Sir John A. Macdonald; Liberal-Conservative
	Wilfrid Laurier; MP for Quebec East (1841–1919)	June 23, 1887	July 10, 1896	Liberal	Sir John A. Macdonald; Liberal-Conservative
	Wilfrid Laurier; MP for Quebec East (1841–1919)	June 23, 1887	July 10, 1896	Liberal	Sir John Abbott; Liberal-Conservative
	Wilfrid Laurier; MP for Quebec East (1841–1919)	June 23, 1887	July 10, 1896	Liberal	Sir John Thompson; Liberal-Conservative
	Wilfrid Laurier; MP for Quebec East (1841–1919)	June 23, 1887	July 10, 1896	Liberal	Sir Mackenzie Bowell; Conservative
	Wilfrid Laurier; MP for Quebec East (1841–1919)	June 23, 1887	July 10, 1896	Liberal	Sir Charles Tupper; Conservative
	Sir Charles Tupper (Note: Tupper lost his seat in the 1900 election and resigned as party leader and Leader of the Opposition three months later.); MP for Cape Breton (1821–1915)	July 11, 1896	February 5, 1901	Conservative	Sir Wilfrid Laurier; Liberal
	Robert Borden; MP for Halifax (until 1904, from 1908); MP for Carleton (1905–1908) (1854–1937)	February 6, 1901	October 9, 1911	Conservative	Sir Wilfrid Laurier; Liberal
	Sir Wilfrid Laurier; MP for Quebec East (1841–1919)	October 10, 1911	February 17, 1919 (Note: Died in office.)	Liberal	Sir Robert Borden; Conservative; Unionist
	Daniel Duncan McKenzie (Note: McKenzie served as Leader of the Opposition and interim leader of the Liberal Party from Laurier's death until King's election in the party's 1919 leadership election, and then remained as opposition leader for a further two months until King was able to enter Parliament via a by-election.); MP for Cape Breton North and Victoria (1859–1927)	February 17, 1919	October 20, 1919	Liberal	Sir Robert Borden; Conservative; Unionist
	William Lyon Mackenzie King; MP for Prince (1874–1950)	October 20, 1919	December 28, 1921	Liberal	Sir Robert Borden; Conservative; Unionist
	William Lyon Mackenzie King; MP for Prince (1874–1950)	October 20, 1919	December 28, 1921	Liberal	Arthur Meighen; Conservative
Vacant (Note: In the 1921 election, the Progressive Party came in second place but declined to form the Opposition, with the role then passing to the third-place Conservatives. However, as Conservative leader Arthur Meighen lost his seat in the election, the post of Opposition leader remained vacant until Meighen returned to the House via a by-election.); December 29, 1921 – January 25, 1922					William Lyon; Mackenzie King; Liberal
	Arthur Meighen; MP for Grenville (1922–1925); MP for Portage la Prairie (from 1925) (1874–1960)	January 26, 1922	June 28, 1926	Conservative	William Lyon; Mackenzie King; Liberal
	William Lyon Mackenzie King; MP for Prince Albert (1874–1950)	June 29, 1926	September 24, 1926	Liberal	Arthur Meighen; Conservative
Vacant (Note: Meighen failed to win his seat in the 1925 election and immediately resigned as leader of the Conservative Party.); September 25 – October 10, 1926					William Lyon; Mackenzie King; Liberal
	Hugh Guthrie (Note: Guthrie served as Leader of the Opposition from shortly after Meighen's resignation until Bennett's election as leader of the Conservative Party.); MP for Wellington South (1866–1939)	October 11, 1926	October 11, 1927	Conservative	William Lyon; Mackenzie King; Liberal
	R. B. Bennett; MP for Calgary West (1870–1947)	October 12, 1927	August 6, 1930	Conservative	William Lyon; Mackenzie King; Liberal
	William Lyon Mackenzie King; MP for Prince Albert (1874–1950)	August 7, 1930	October 22, 1935	Liberal	R. B. Bennett; Conservative
	R. B. Bennett; MP for Calgary West (1870–1947)	October 23, 1935	July 6, 1938	Conservative	William Lyon; Mackenzie King; Liberal
	Robert James Manion; MP for London (1881–1943)	July 7, 1938	May 13, 1940	Conservative	William Lyon; Mackenzie King; Liberal
	Richard Hanson (Note: Hanson served as Leader of the Opposition from Manion's resignation until Meighen's election as leader of the Conservative Party. He continued as acting Leader of the Opposition throughout Meighen's term as Conservative leader, as Meighen failed in his attempts to win election to the House of Commons, and continued as acting Leader of the Opposition from Bracken's election as PC leader until his own resignation.); MP for Fredericton (1879–1948)	May 14, 1940	January 1, 1943	Conservative	William Lyon; Mackenzie King; Liberal
	Richard Hanson; MP for Fredericton (1879–1948)	May 14, 1940	January 1, 1943	Progressive; Conservative (Note: The Conservative Party was renamed the Progressive Conservative Party in 1942.)	William Lyon; Mackenzie King; Liberal
	Gordon Graydon (Note: Graydon served as Leader of the Opposition from Hanson's resignation until Bracken entered Parliament in the 1945 election.); MP for Peel (1896–1953)	January 1, 1943	June 10, 1945	Progressive; Conservative	William Lyon; Mackenzie King; Liberal
	John Bracken; MP for Neepawa (1883–1969)	June 11, 1945	July 20, 1948	Progressive; Conservative	William Lyon; Mackenzie King; Liberal
Vacant (Note: Bracken immediately vacated his positions as Leader of the Official Opposition and as leader of the Progressive Conservative parliamentary caucus when he resigned. Because Parliament did not sit in the second half of 1948, it never became necessary for the Progressive Conservatives to name an interim parliamentary leader to cover the gap until Drew could enter parliament via by-election.); July 21 – December 20, 1948					William Lyon; Mackenzie King; Liberal
	George A. Drew; MP for Carleton (1894–1973)	December 20, 1948	November 1, 1954	Progressive; Conservative	William Lyon; Mackenzie King; Liberal
	George A. Drew; MP for Carleton (1894–1973)	December 20, 1948	November 1, 1954	Progressive; Conservative	Louis St. Laurent; Liberal
	William Earl Rowe (Note: Rowe served as acting leader of the Opposition in winter 1954–55 due to Drew's poor health.); MP for Dufferin—Simcoe (1894–1984)	November 1, 1954	February 1, 1955	Progressive; Conservative	Louis St. Laurent; Liberal
	George A. Drew; MP for Carleton (1894–1973)	February 1, 1955	August 1, 1956	Progressive; Conservative	Louis St. Laurent; Liberal
	William Earl Rowe (Note: Rowe initially served as acting leader of the Opposition for six weeks when Drew was ill, then became interim leader of the Progressive Conservative Party until Diefenbaker was elected as PC leader.); MP for Dufferin—Simcoe (1894–1984)	August 1, 1956	December 13, 1956	Progressive; Conservative	Louis St. Laurent; Liberal
	John Diefenbaker; MP for Prince Albert (1895–1979)	December 14, 1956	June 20, 1957	Progressive; Conservative	Louis St. Laurent; Liberal
	Louis St. Laurent; MP for Quebec East (1882–1973)	June 21, 1957	January 16, 1958	Liberal	John Diefenbaker; Progressive; Conservative
	Lester B. Pearson; MP for Algoma East (1897–1972)	January 16, 1958	April 22, 1963	Liberal	John Diefenbaker; Progressive; Conservative
	John Diefenbaker; MP for Prince Albert (1895–1979)	April 22, 1963	September 9, 1967	Progressive; Conservative	Lester B. Pearson; Liberal
	Michael Starr (Note: Starr served as Leader of the Opposition from Stanfield's election as PC leader until Stanfield entered Parliament via by-election.); MP for Ontario (1910–2000)	September 9, 1967	November 6, 1967	Progressive; Conservative	Lester B. Pearson; Liberal
	Robert Stanfield; MP for Colchester—Hants (1967–1968); MP for Halifax (from 1968) (1914–2003)	November 6, 1967	February 22, 1976	Progressive; Conservative	Lester B. Pearson; Liberal
	Robert Stanfield; MP for Colchester—Hants (1967–1968); MP for Halifax (from 1968) (1914–2003)	November 6, 1967	February 22, 1976	Progressive; Conservative	Pierre Trudeau; Liberal
	Joe Clark; MP for Rocky Mountain (born 1939)	February 22, 1976	June 4, 1979	Progressive; Conservative	Pierre Trudeau; Liberal
	Pierre Trudeau; MP for Mount Royal (1919–2000)	June 4, 1979	March 3, 1980	Liberal	Joe Clark; Progressive; Conservative
	Joe Clark; MP for Yellowhead (born 1939)	March 3, 1980	February 2, 1983	Progressive; Conservative	Pierre Trudeau; Liberal
	Erik Nielsen (Note: Nielsen served as acting Leader of the Opposition for the two weeks preceding Clark's resignation from the post of leader of the PC Party. He continued as Leader of the Opposition during the 1983 Progressive Conservative leadership campaign in which Clark unsuccessfully ran to succeed himself. Nielsen continued as Leader of the Opposition from Mulroney's election as PC leader until Mulroney entered Parliament via by-election.); MP for Yukon (1924–2008)	February 2, 1983	August 29, 1983	Progressive; Conservative	Pierre Trudeau; Liberal
	Brian Mulroney; MP for Central Nova (1939–2024)	August 29, 1983	September 17, 1984	Progressive; Conservative	Pierre Trudeau; Liberal
	Brian Mulroney; MP for Central Nova (1939–2024)	August 29, 1983	September 17, 1984	Progressive; Conservative	John Turner; Liberal
	John Turner; MP for Vancouver Quadra (1929–2020)	September 17, 1984	February 8, 1990	Liberal	Brian Mulroney; Progressive; Conservative
	Herb Gray (Note: Gray became acting Leader of the Opposition after Turner announced his intention to step down as party leader. Gray continued as Leader of the Opposition from Chrétien's election as Liberal leader until Chrétien entered Parliament via a by-election.); MP for Windsor West (1931–2014)	February 8, 1990	December 10, 1990	Liberal	Brian Mulroney; Progressive; Conservative
	Jean Chrétien; MP for Beauséjour (born 1934)	December 10, 1990	November 4, 1993	Liberal	Brian Mulroney; Progressive; Conservative
	Jean Chrétien; MP for Beauséjour (born 1934)	December 10, 1990	November 4, 1993	Liberal	Kim Campbell; Progressive; Conservative
	Lucien Bouchard; MP for Lac-Saint-Jean (born 1938)	November 4, 1993	January 15, 1996	Bloc Québécois	Jean Chrétien; Liberal
	Gilles Duceppe (Note: Duceppe served as Leader of the Opposition during the 1996 Bloc Québécois leadership election initiated by Bouchard's sudden resignation from federal politics to become Premier of Quebec.); MP for Laurier—Sainte-Marie (born 1947)	January 15, 1996	February 17, 1996	Bloc Québécois	Jean Chrétien; Liberal
	Michel Gauthier; MP for Roberval—Lac-Saint-Jean (1950–2020)	February 17, 1996	March 15, 1997	Bloc Québécois	Jean Chrétien; Liberal
	Gilles Duceppe; MP for Laurier—Sainte-Marie (born 1947)	March 15, 1997	June 2, 1997	Bloc Québécois	Jean Chrétien; Liberal
	Preston Manning; MP for Calgary Southwest (born 1942)	June 2, 1997	March 27, 2000	Reform	Jean Chrétien; Liberal
	Deborah Grey (Note: Grey served as Leader of the Opposition during the 2000 Canadian Alliance leadership campaign in which Manning unsuccessfully ran to succeed himself. She continued as Leader of the Opposition from Day's election as Alliance leader until Day entered Parliament via byelection.); MP for Edmonton North (born 1952)	March 27, 2000	September 11, 2000	Canadian Alliance	Jean Chrétien; Liberal
	Stockwell Day; MP for Okanagan—Coquihalla (born 1950)	September 11, 2000	December 12, 2001	Canadian Alliance	Jean Chrétien; Liberal
	John Reynolds; MP for West Vancouver– Sunshine Coast (born 1942)	December 12, 2001	May 21, 2002	Canadian Alliance	Jean Chrétien; Liberal
	Stephen Harper; MP for Calgary Southwest (born 1959)	May 21, 2002	January 9, 2004	Canadian Alliance	Jean Chrétien; Liberal
	Stephen Harper; MP for Calgary Southwest (born 1959)	May 21, 2002	January 9, 2004	Canadian Alliance	Paul Martin; Liberal
	Grant Hill (Note: Hill served as Leader of the Opposition during the 2004 Conservative leadership election in which Harper successfully ran to be leader of the new party.); MP for Macleod (born 1943)	January 9, 2004	March 20, 2004	Canadian Alliance	Paul Martin; Liberal
	Grant Hill; MP for Macleod (born 1943)	January 9, 2004	March 20, 2004	Conservative (Note: Although the PC Party and Canadian Alliance were recognized as merged on December 7, 2003, by Elections Canada for the purposes of elections law, they did not merge their parliamentary caucuses until February 2, 2004.)	Paul Martin; Liberal
	Stephen Harper; MP for Calgary Southwest (born 1959)	March 20, 2004	February 6, 2006	Conservative	Paul Martin; Liberal
	Bill Graham (Note: Graham served as interim parliamentary leader, interim Leader of the Liberal Party and Leader of the Opposition until the 2006 Liberal leadership convention.); MP for Toronto Centre (1939–2022)	February 6, 2006	December 2, 2006	Liberal	Stephen Harper; Conservative
	Stéphane Dion; MP for Saint-Laurent–Cartierville (born 1955)	December 2, 2006	December 10, 2008	Liberal	Stephen Harper; Conservative
	Michael Ignatieff (Note: Ignatieff served as interim Leader of Liberal Party until being elected Leader in the 2009 Liberal leadership convention.); MP for Etobicoke–Lakeshore (born 1947)	December 10, 2008	May 2, 2011	Liberal	Stephen Harper; Conservative
	Jack Layton; MP for Toronto–Danforth (1950–2011)	May 2, 2011	August 22, 2011	New Democratic	Stephen Harper; Conservative
	Nycole Turmel (Note: Turmel became interim leader of the NDP on July 28, 2011, when Layton began his leave of absence, but she did not become the Leader of the Opposition until Layton's death.); MP for Hull—Aylmer (born 1942)	August 22, 2011	March 24, 2012	New Democratic	Stephen Harper; Conservative
	Tom Mulcair; MP for Outremont (born 1954)	March 24, 2012	November 4, 2015	New Democratic	Stephen Harper; Conservative
	Rona Ambrose (Note: Ambrose was elected interim party leader by the Conservative caucus to serve until a permanent leader was elected at the 2017 Conservative Party of Canada leadership election.); MP for Sturgeon River—Parkland (born 1969)	November 4, 2015	May 27, 2017	Conservative	Justin Trudeau; Liberal
	Andrew Scheer; MP for Regina—Qu'Appelle (born 1979)	May 27, 2017	August 24, 2020	Conservative	Justin Trudeau; Liberal
	Erin O'Toole; MP for Durham (born 1973)	August 24, 2020	February 2, 2022	Conservative	Justin Trudeau; Liberal
	Candice Bergen (Note: Bergen was elected interim party leader by the Conservative caucus to serve until a permanent leader was elected at the 2022 Conservative Party of Canada leadership election.); MP for Portage—Lisgar (born 1964)	February 2, 2022	September 10, 2022	Conservative	Justin Trudeau; Liberal
	Pierre Poilievre; MP for Carleton (born 1979)	September 10, 2022	April 28, 2025	Conservative	Justin Trudeau; Liberal
	Pierre Poilievre; MP for Carleton (born 1979)	September 10, 2022	April 28, 2025	Conservative	Mark Carney; Liberal
Vacant (Note: Poilievre lost his seat in the 2025 election and thus ceased to be leader of the Opposition.); April 28, 2025 – May 6, 2025					Mark Carney; Liberal
	Andrew Scheer (Note: Following the defeat of party leader Pierre Poilievre in the 2025 election, the Conservative caucus selected Scheer to serve as the interim parliamentary leader, and thus leader of the Opposition.); MP for Regina—Qu'Appelle (born 1979)	May 6, 2025	August 18, 2025	Conservative	Mark Carney; Liberal
	Pierre Poilievre; MP for Battle River—Crowfoot (born 1979)	August 18, 2025	Incumbent	Conservative	

== Deputy leaders of the Opposition ==
Portrait	Name Electoral district (Birth–Death)	Term of office		Party	Leader of the Opposition
Portrait	Name Electoral district (Birth–Death)	Term start	Term end	Party	Leader of the Opposition
	Denis Lebel; MP for Lac-Saint-Jean (born 1954)	November 19, 2015	July 24, 2017	Conservative	Rona Ambrose
	Denis Lebel; MP for Lac-Saint-Jean (born 1954)	November 19, 2015	July 24, 2017	Conservative	Andrew Scheer
	Lisa Raitt; MP for Milton (born 1968)	July 24, 2017	October 21, 2019	Conservative	Andrew Scheer
	Leona Alleslev; MP for Aurora–Oak Ridges–Richmond Hill (born 1968)	November 28, 2019	July 12, 2020	Conservative	Andrew Scheer
	Candice Bergen; MP for Portage–Lisgar (born 1964)	September 2, 2020	February 2, 2022	Conservative	Erin O'Toole
	Luc Berthold; MP for Mégantic—L'Érable (born 1965 or 1966)	February 6, 2022	September 13, 2022	Conservative	Candice Bergen
	Melissa Lantsman; MP for Thornhill (born 1984)	September 13, 2022	Incumbent	Conservative	Pierre Poilievre; Andrew Scheer; Pierre Poilievre
	Tim Uppal; MP for Edmonton Gateway (born 1974)	September 13, 2022	Incumbent	Conservative	Pierre Poilievre; Andrew Scheer; Pierre Poilievre

== Official Opposition Shadow Cabinet ==
The Official Opposition Shadow Cabinet in Canada is composed of members of the main opposition party and is responsible for holding the government to account and for developing and disseminating the party's policy positions. Members of the Official Opposition are generally referred to as opposition critics, but the term Shadow Minister (which is generally used in other Westminster systems) is also used.

== See also ==
- Opposition House Leader
- Leader of the Opposition in the Senate (Canada)
