= Carole Jacques =

Canadian politician

Member of Parliament for Montreal—Mercier
- In office 1984–1988
- Preceded by: Céline Hervieux-Payette
- Succeeded by: riding dissolved

Member of Parliament for Mercier
- In office 1988–1993
- Preceded by: first member
- Succeeded by: Francine Lalonde

Personal details
- Born: 12 June 1960 (age 65)
- Party: Progressive Conservative

Carole Jacques (born 12 June 1960) was a Progressive Conservative member of the House of Commons of Canada. She was a lawyer by career.

She represented the Quebec riding of Montreal—Mercier where she was first elected in the 1984 federal election. At the time of her election, she was the youngest woman ever elected to the House of Commons. She was re-elected in 1988 when she ran in the Mercier riding following electoral district boundary changes in 1987. She served in the 33rd and 34th Canadian Parliaments.

Jacques left the Progressive Conservative party and became an independent candidate for the Mercier riding in the 1993 federal election. However, she lost to Francine Lalonde of the Bloc Québécois.

In 1998, Jacques was convicted of two counts of influence peddling and two counts of conspiracy to commit influence peddling, relating to acts committed in 1991, while she was serving in Parliament. The Quebec Court of Appeal rejected her appeal in 2001.

As a result of her criminal convictions, the Barreau du Québec, the professional order for lawyers in Quebec, revoked her licence to practise law in 1998, but it was subsequently restored.
