= La Pointe-de-l'Île =

Federal electoral district in Quebec, Canada

Quebec electoral district
- Interactive map of riding boundaries from the 2015 federal election
- Coordinates: 45.651°N 73.509°W

Federal electoral district
- Legislature: House of Commons
MP
Mario Beaulieu
Bloc Québécois
- District created: 2003
- First contested: 2004
- Last contested: 2025
- District webpage: profile, map

Demographics
- Population (2016): 106,336
- Electors (2019): 85,589
- Area (km²): 43
- Pop. density (per km²): 2,472.9
- Census division: Montreal
- Census subdivision(s): Montreal (part), Montréal-Est

La Pointe-de-l'Île (French pronunciation: [la pwɛ̃t də lil]) is a federal electoral district in Quebec, Canada, that has been represented in the House of Commons of Canada since 2004. Its population in 2001 was 98,878.

The riding was created in 2003 from parts of Anjou—Rivière-des-Prairies, Hochelaga—Maisonneuve, and Mercier ridings.

== Geography ==
The district includes the City of Montréal-Est, the neighbourhood of Pointe-aux-Trembles in the Borough of Rivière-des-Prairies–Pointe-aux-Trembles, and the eastern part of the neighbourhood of Longue-Pointe and the southern part of the neighbourhood of Mercier-Est in the Borough of Mercier–Hochelaga-Maisonneuve.

The neighbouring ridings are Hochelaga, Honoré-Mercier, Montcalm, Repentigny, Verchères—Les Patriotes, and Longueuil—Pierre-Boucher.

== Demographics ==
According to the 2016 Canadian census

- Languages: (2016) 83.0% French, 3.5% Spanish, 2.6% English, 2.0% Creole, 1.9% Arabic, 1.3% Italian, 0.6% Portuguese, 0.6% Romanian, 0.5% Vietnamese, 0.5% Kabyle

== History ==
The riding is located in Eastern Montreal, traditionally the power base of the Quebec sovereignty movement. It had long been reckoned as the Bloc Québécois' safest riding. However, in 2011, after the retirement of longtime MP Francine Lalonde, it fell to the New Democratic Party along with all of the other ridings in Eastern Montreal.

This riding lost territory to Hochelaga and gained territory from Honoré-Mercier during the 2012 electoral redistribution.

=== Member of Parliament ===
This riding has elected the following members of Parliament:

| Parliament | Years | Member | Party |
|---|---|---|---|
La Pointe-de-l'Île; Riding created from Anjou—Rivière-des-Prairies, Hochelaga—Maisonneuve and Mercier
| 38th | 2004–2006 | Francine Lalonde | Bloc Québécois |
| 39th | 2006–2008 | Francine Lalonde | Bloc Québécois |
| 40th | 2008–2011 | Francine Lalonde | Bloc Québécois |
| 41st | 2011–2015 | Ève Péclet | New Democratic |
| 42nd | 2015–2019 | Mario Beaulieu | Bloc Québécois |
| 43rd | 2019–2021 | Mario Beaulieu | Bloc Québécois |
| 44th | 2021–2025 | Mario Beaulieu | Bloc Québécois |
| 45th | 2025–present | Mario Beaulieu | Bloc Québécois |

== Election results ==
2025 Canadian federal election
| Party | Candidate | Votes | % | ±% |
|---|---|---|---|---|
| Bloc Québécois | Mario Beaulieu | 22,940 | 43.11 | -3.55 |
| Liberal | Viviane Minko | 20,051 | 37.68 | +5.37 |
| Conservative | Violetta Potapova | 6,781 | 12.74 | +6.04 |
| New Democratic | Ghada Chaabi | 2,279 | 4.28 | -5.42 |
| Green | Olivier Huard | 977 | 1.84 | N/A |
| Marxist–Leninist | Geneviève Royer | 181 | 0.34 | +0.03 |
| Total valid votes | | 53,209 | 98.18 | |
| Total rejected ballots | | 987 | 1.82 | -0.55 |
| Turnout | | 54,196 | 65.03 | +2.82 |
| Eligible voters | | 83,342 | | |
| Bloc Québécois hold | | Swing | | -4.46 |
Source: Elections Canada
Note: number of eligible voters does not include voting day registrations.

2021 Canadian federal election
| Party | Candidate | Votes | % | ±% | Expenditures |
|---|---|---|---|---|---|
| Bloc Québécois | Mario Beaulieu | 23,835 | 46.66 | -0.1 | $40,618.35 |
| Liberal | Jonas Fadeu | 16,508 | 32.32 | +1.9 | $37,367.99 |
| New Democratic | Alexandre Vallerand | 4,954 | 9.70 | -1.2 | $0.00 |
| Conservative | Massimo Anania | 3,427 | 6.71 | -0.5 | $2,567.20 |
| People's | Jonathan Desclin | 1,399 | 2.74 | +2.0 | $1,481.55 |
| Free | Agnès Falquet | 577 | 1.13 | N/A | $604.58 |
| Indépendance du Québec | Charles Phillippe Gervais | 221 | 0.43 | ±0.0 | $0.00 |
| Marxist–Leninist | Genevieve Royer | 159 | 0.31 | +0.1 | $0.00 |
| Total valid votes/expense limit | | 51,080 | 97.63 | – | $113,429.83 |
| Total rejected ballots | | 1,239 | 2.37 | | |
| Turnout | | 52,319 | 62.21 | | |
| Registered voters | | 84,099 | | | |
| Bloc Québécois hold | | Swing | | -1.0 | |
Source: Elections Canada

2019 Canadian federal election
| Party | Candidate | Votes | % | ±% | Expenditures |
|---|---|---|---|---|---|
| Bloc Québécois | Mario Beaulieu | 26,010 | 46.84 | +13.26 | $38,017.09 |
| Liberal | Jonathan Plamondon | 16,898 | 30.43 | +1.86 | $50,221.87 |
| New Democratic | Ève Péclet | 6,057 | 10.91 | -15.85 | $6,545.53 |
| Conservative | Robert Coutu | 3,984 | 7.17 | -0.81 | $25,219.21 |
| Green | Franco Fiori | 1,910 | 3.44 | | none listed |
| People's | Randy Manseau | 388 | 0.70 | | none listed |
| Indépendance du Québec | Jacinthe Lafrenaye | 199 | 0.4 | | $636.28 |
| Marxist–Leninist | Geneviève Royer | 88 | 0.2 | | $0.00 |
| Total valid votes/expense limit | | 55,534 | 100.0 | | |
| Total rejected ballots | | 1,141 | | | |
| Turnout | | 56,675 | 66.2 | | |
| Eligible voters | | 85,589 | | | |
| Bloc Québécois hold | | Swing | | +5.70 | |
Source: Elections Canada

2015 Canadian federal election
| Party | Candidate | Votes | % | ±% | Expenditures |
|---|---|---|---|---|---|
| Bloc Québécois | Mario Beaulieu | 18,545 | 33.58 | +1.21 | $48,190.59 |
| Liberal | Marie-Chantale Simard | 15,777 | 28.57 | +18.47 | $5,384.21 |
| New Democratic | Ève Péclet | 14,777 | 26.76 | -20.77 | $51,626.51 |
| Conservative | Guy Morissette | 4,408 | 7.98 | +0.33 | $4,736.10 |
| Green | David J. Cox | 1,130 | 2.05 | +0.16 | – |
| Rhinoceros | Ben 97 Benoit | 358 | 0.65 | – | $1,062.19 |
| Strength in Democracy | Jean-François Larose | 135 | 0.24 | – | – |
| Marxist–Leninist | Geneviève Royer | 96 | 0.17 | – | – |
| Total valid votes/expense limit | | 55,226 | 100.00 | | $222,699.43 |
| Total rejected ballots | | 912 | 1.62 | – | |
| Turnout | | 56,138 | 65.43 | – | |
| Eligible voters | | 84,507 | | | |
| Bloc Québécois gain from New Democratic | | Swing | | +10.99 | |
Source: Elections Canada

2011 federal election redistributed results
| Party | Vote | % |
|---|---|---|
| New Democratic | 23,613 | 47.53 |
| Bloc Québécois | 16,081 | 32.37 |
| Liberal | 5,018 | 10.10 |
| Conservative | 3,801 | 7.65 |
| Green | 936 | 1.88 |
| Others | 235 | 0.47 |

2011 Canadian federal election
| Party | Candidate | Votes | % | ±% | Expenditures |
|---|---|---|---|---|---|
| New Democratic | Ève Péclet | 23,033 | 48.34 | +35.44 | none listed |
| Bloc Québécois | Ginette Beaudry | 15,475 | 32.48 | −23.61 | $75,555 |
| Liberal | Olivier L. Coulombe | 4,369 | 9.17 | −6.82 | $4,159 |
| Conservative | Mathieu Drolet | 3,664 | 7.69 | −3.49 | $4,500 |
| Green | David J. Cox | 898 | 1.89 | −1.00 | $125 |
| Marxist–Leninist | Claude Brunelle | 213 | 0.45 | | none listed |
| Total valid votes/expense limit | | 47,652 | 100.0 | | |
| Total rejected ballots | | 813 | 1.68 | | |
| Turnout | | 48,465 | 60.43 | +0.97 | |
| Eligible voters | | 80,201 | | | |
Sources: Official Results, Elections Canada and Financial Returns, Elections Canada.

2008 Canadian federal election
| Party | Candidate | Votes | % | ±% | Expenditures |
|---|---|---|---|---|---|
| Bloc Québécois | Francine Lalonde (incumbent) | 25,976 | 56.09 | −4.37 | $54,814 |
| Liberal | Oumy Sarr | 7,403 | 15.99 | +1.88 | $7,501 |
| New Democratic | Isabelle McGuire | 5,975 | 12.90 | +5.89 | none listed |
| Conservative | Hubert Pichet | 5,179 | 11.18 | −4.06 | $49,752 |
| Green | Domita Cundari | 1,340 | 2.89 | −0.29 | none listed |
| Rhinoceros | Ben 97 Benoit | 261 | 0.56 | – | $1,608 |
| Marxist–Leninist | Claude Brunelle | 177 | 0.38 | – | none listed |
| Total valid votes/expense limit | | 46,311 | 100.0 | – | $84,945 |
| Total rejected ballots | | 688 | 1.46 | | |
| Turnout | | 46,999 | 59.46 | −2.86 | |
| Eligible voters | | 79,049 | | | |
Sources: Official Results, Elections Canada and Financial Returns, Elections Canada.

2006 Canadian federal election
| Party | Candidate | Votes | % | ±% | Expenditures |
|---|---|---|---|---|---|
| Bloc Québécois | Francine Lalonde (incumbent) | 29,368 | 60.46 | −6.01 | $62,051 |
| Conservative | Christian Prévost | 7,402 | 15.24 | +11.00 | $7,391 |
| Liberal | Marie-Migniaud Dominique | 6,855 | 14.11 | −8.82 | $9,649 |
| New Democratic | Nicolas Tremblay | 3,407 | 7.01 | +3.22 | $1,505 |
| Green | Benjamin Rankin | 1,544 | 3.18 | +0.61 | $12 |
| Total valid votes | | 48,576 | 100.00 | | |
| Total rejected ballots | | 739 | | | |
| Turnout | | 49,315 | 62.32 | +3.14 | |
| Electors on the lists | | 79,135 | | | |
Sources: Official Results, Elections Canada and Financial Returns, Elections Canada.

2004 Canadian federal election
| Party | Candidate | Votes | % | ±% | Expenditures |
|---|---|---|---|---|---|
| Bloc Québécois | Francine Lalonde | 30,713 | 66.47 | +13.35 | $58,592 |
| Liberal | Jean-Claude Gobé | 10,593 | 22.93 | −9.79 | $62,081 |
| Conservative | Christian Prévost | 1,961 | 4.24 | −3.11 | $5,476 |
| New Democratic | André Langevin | 1,751 | 3.79 | +2.69 | none listed |
| Green | André Levert | 1,186 | 2.57 | – | none listed |
| Total valid votes | | 46,204 | 100.00 | | |
| Total rejected ballots | | 1,075 | | | |
| Turnout | | 47,279 | 59.18 | | |
| Electors on the lists | | 79,894 | | | |
Sources: Official Results, Elections Canada and Financial Returns, Elections Canada.

== See also ==
- List of Canadian electoral districts
- Historical federal electoral districts of Canada
