= Joseph Jean =

Canadian politician

Member of the Canadian Parliament for Maisonneuve
- In office 1932–1935
- Preceded by: Clément Robitaille
- Succeeded by: District was abolished in 1933

Member of the Canadian Parliament for Mercier
- In office 1935–1949
- Preceded by: District was created in 1933
- Succeeded by: Marcel Monette

Personal details
- Born: February 7, 1890 St-Philippe de Néri, Quebec
- Died: July 18, 1973 (aged 83)
- Party: Liberal
- Cabinet: Solicitor General of Canada (1945–1949)
- Portfolio: Parliamentary Assistant to the Minister of Justice and Attorney General (1943–1944)

Joseph-Arthur Jean, PC, QC (February 7, 1890 – July 18, 1973) was a Canadian politician.

Born in St-Philippe-de-Néri, Quebec, he was first elected to the House of Commons of Canada representing the Quebec riding of Maisonneuve in a 1932 by-election. A Liberal, he was re-elected in 1935, 1940, 1945, and 1949 representing the riding of Mercier. From 1943 to 1945, he was the Parliamentary Assistant to the Minister of Justice and Attorney General. From 1945 to 1949, he was the Solicitor General of Canada.

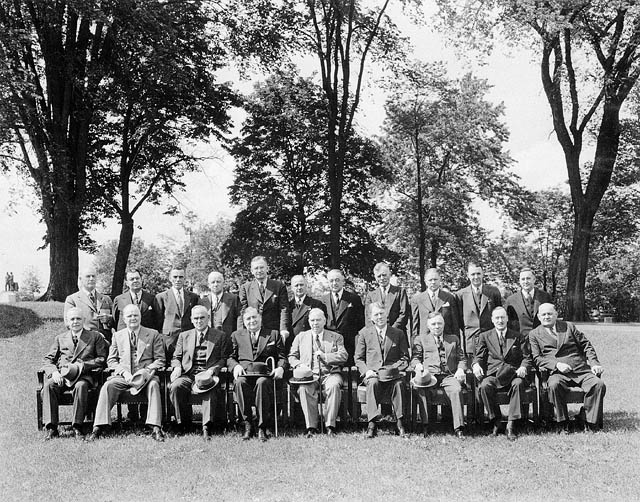
Hon. Joseph Jean and colleagues in the 16th Canadian Ministry (Rear, L-R): Hons. J. J. McCann, Paul Martin, Joseph Jean, J. A. Glen, Brooke Claxton, Alphonse Fournier, Ernest Bertrand, A. G. L. McNaughton, Lionel Chevrier, D. C. Abbott, D. L. MacLaren Date
