= Maisonneuve (federal electoral district) =

Former federal electoral district in Quebec, Canada

Quebec electoral district

Defunct federal electoral district
- Legislature: House of Commons
- District created: 1892
- District abolished: 1933
- First contested: 1896
- Last contested: 1932 by-election

Maisonneuve (French pronunciation: [mɛzɔ̃nœv]) was a federal electoral district in Quebec, Canada, that was represented in the House of Commons of Canada from 1896 to 1935.

A "Maisonneuve" riding also existed from 1966 to 1970 when it renamed "Maisonneuve—Rosemont", and from 1976 to 1978 when it was renamed "Hochelaga—Maisonneuve". See those article for information on those periods.

This riding was created in 1892 from parts of Hochelaga ridings.

The electoral district of Maisonneuve consisted initially of:

- the towns of Maisonneuve and Côte St. Louis,
- the villages of Côte de la Visitation and Mile End, and
- Hochelaga and St. Jean Baptiste wards in the city of Montreal.

In 1914, it was redefined to consist of:

- the town of Maisonneuve,
- Rosemount ward and Longue Point ward of the city of Montreal,
- Pointe-aux-Trembles town and parish,
- Rivière-des-Prairies,
- Sault au Recollet town and parish,
- St. Léonard-de-Port-Maurice,
- the town of Montréal Est,
- the town of St. Michel-de-Laval, and
- the area on which is situated the St. Jean-de-Dieu hospital.

In 1924, it was redefined to consist of:

- the portion of the Island of Montreal lying north of a line drawn from Rivière des Prairies along Ste. Claire Avenue, the southern boundary of the Seminary of St. Sulpice's domain, Crémazie Boulevard, St. Hubert Street, Côte St. Michel Road, the northwestern limit of the city of Montreal, Iberville Street, the Canadian Pacific Railway track, Nolan Street, and Bourbonnière Avenue, to the St. Lawrence River.

It was abolished in 1933 when it was redistributed into Maisonneuve—Rosemont and Mercier ridings.

== Members of Parliament ==
This riding elected the following members of Parliament:

Parliament	Years	Member	Party
Maisonneuve; Riding created from Hochelaga
8th	1896–1900	Raymond Préfontaine	Liberal
9th	1900–1902	Raymond Préfontaine	Liberal
9th	1902–1904	Raymond Préfontaine	Liberal
10th	1904–1905	Raymond Préfontaine	Liberal
10th	1906–1908	Alphonse Verville	Labour
11th	1908–1911	Alphonse Verville	Labour
12th	1911–1917	Alphonse Verville	Labour
13th	1917–1921	Rodolphe Lemieux	Opposition (Laurier Liberals)
14th	1921–1925	Clément Robitaille	Liberal
15th	1925–1926	Clément Robitaille	Liberal
16th	1926–1930	Clément Robitaille	Liberal
17th	1930–1932	Clément Robitaille	Liberal
17th	1932–1935	Joseph Jean	Liberal
Riding dissolved into Maisonneuve—Rosemont and Mercier

== Election results ==
1896 Canadian federal election
Party	Candidate	Votes
Liberal	Raymond Préfontaine	3,912
Conservative	Georges-Edmond Baril	2,342

1900 Canadian federal election
Party	Candidate	Votes
Liberal	Raymond Préfontaine	4,844
Conservative	L. Ouimet	3,070

By-election: On Mr. Préfontaine being appointed Minister of Marine and Fisheries, 11 November 1902

By-election on 9 December 1902
Party	Candidate	Votes
Liberal	Raymond Préfontaine	4,370
Conservative	J. Alfred Labelle	2,510

1904 Canadian federal election
Party	Candidate	Votes
Liberal	Raymond Préfontaine	5,967
Conservative	S. D. Vallières	3,795

By-election: On Mr. Préfontaine's death, 25 December 1905

By-election on 23 February 1906
Party	Candidate	Votes
Labour	Alphonse Verville	4,887
Liberal	L. O. Grothe	3,830

1908 Canadian federal election
Party	Candidate	Votes
Labour	Alphonse Verville	7,358
Independent	Frédéric Villeneuve	2,937

1911 Canadian federal election
Party	Candidate	Votes
Labour	Alphonse Verville	11,538
Conservative	Eugène Walter Villeneuve	9,349

1917 Canadian federal election
Party	Candidate	Votes
Opposition (Laurier Liberals)	Rodolphe Lemieux	7,173
Government (Unionist)	Charles Hazlitt Cahan	3,140

1921 Canadian federal election
Party	Candidate	Votes
Liberal	Clément Robitaille	14,222
Independent	Zoël Tardif	2,133
Conservative	Joseph Émile Bernier	1,944
Independent	Joseph-Onézime-Edmon Leclair	151

1925 Canadian federal election
Party	Candidate	Votes
Liberal	Clément Robitaille	12,624
Conservative	Hubert Desjardins	7,406
Labour	William Tremblay	994
Independent	Daniel McAvoy	183

1926 Canadian federal election
Party	Candidate	Votes
Liberal	Clément Robitaille	16,045
Conservative	Raoul Dumouchel	5,166

1930 Canadian federal election
Party	Candidate	Votes
Liberal	Clément Robitaille	18,894
Conservative	Hubert Desjardins	13,492
Independent	Déus Courchesne	1,053
Conservative	Edmond Simard	313

By-election: On Mr. Robitaille's death, 16 January 1932

By-election on 27 June 1932
Party	Candidate	Votes
Liberal	Joseph Jean	15,748
Conservative	Jean Fauteux	14,443
Labour	Alexander Gauld	617
Independent	Héliodord Binette	567
Independent	Déus Courchesne	264

== See also ==
- List of Canadian electoral districts
- Historical federal electoral districts of Canada
