= Prosper Boulanger =

Canadian politician

- Official 1974 portrait

Member of the Canadian Parliament for Mercier
- In office 1962–1979
- Preceded by: André Gillet
- Succeeded by: Céline Hervieux-Payette

Personal details
- Born: November 17, 1918 St-Eugène de l'Islet, Quebec, Canada
- Died: December 5, 2002 (aged 84)
- Party: Liberal
- Occupation: businessman

Prosper Boulanger (November 17, 1918 – December 5, 2002) was a Canadian politician and businessman from Montréal. He was elected to the House of Commons of Canada in 1962 as a Member of the Liberal Party to represent the riding of Mercier. He was re-elected in 1963, 1965, 1968, 1972 and 1974.

== Early life and education ==
He attended Adelard-Langevin School, St. Louis Academy, and the Plateau secondary school in Montreal.

== Career ==
Boulanger was a Montreal councilman and commissioner.

During his career as a Member of Parliament, he was Chair of the Canadian House of Commons Standing Committee on Veterans Affairs and also a member of the Canadian House of Commons Standing Committee on Fisheries and Forestry and the Canadian House of Commons Standing Committee on Procedure and Organization and served as Assistant Deputy Chair of Committees of the Whole. Boulanger was also a councillor on the Montreal City Council and also served in the Royal Canadian Air Force between 1939 and 1946.

Despite his six terms, Boulanger spoke only once in Parliament, in 1962. He was the assistant Liberal whip.

== Civic activities ==
Boulanger was active in the East Montreal Businessmen's Association and the eastern division of the Montreal Red Cross, and served as president of those organizations.

== Personal life ==
He was married and had four children.
