= Michel Gauthier =

Canadian politician (1950–2020)

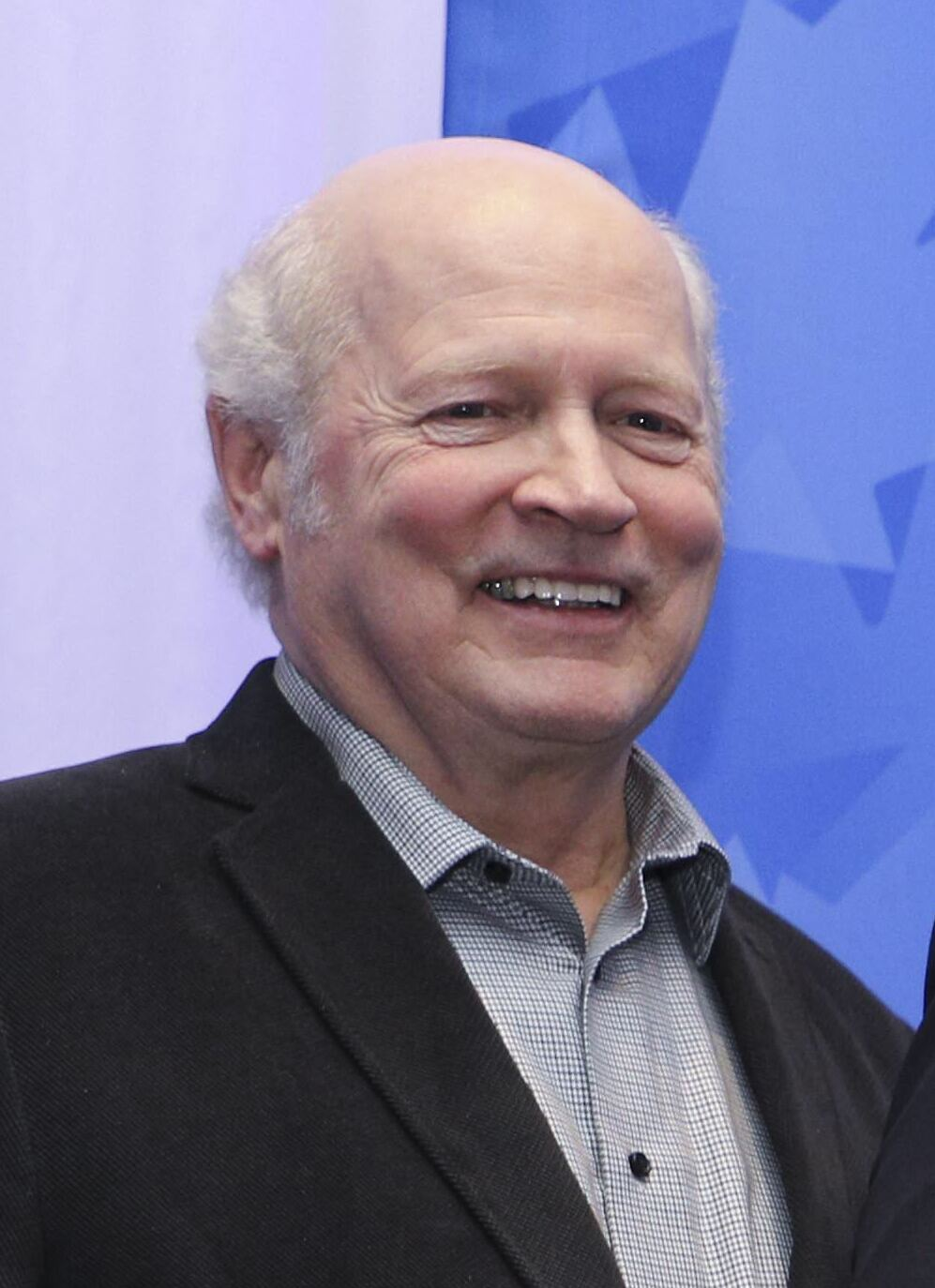
- Gauthier in 2018

Leader of the Opposition
- In office February 17, 1996 – March 14, 1997
- Preceded by: Gilles Duceppe
- Succeeded by: Gilles Duceppe

Leader of the Bloc Québécois
- In office February 17, 1996 – March 14, 1997
- Preceded by: Gilles Duceppe (interim)
- Succeeded by: Gilles Duceppe

Member of Parliament for Roberval—Lac-Saint-Jean
- In office January 17, 1994 – July 29, 2007
- Preceded by: Benoit Bouchard
- Succeeded by: Denis Lebel

Member of the Quebec National Assembly for Roberval
- In office 1981–1988
- Preceded by: Robert Lamontagne
- Succeeded by: Gaston Blackburn

Personal details
- Born: February 18, 1950 Quebec City, Quebec, Canada
- Died: May 30, 2020 (aged 70)
- Party: Conservative (2018–2020)
- Other political affiliations: Bloc Québécois (1993–2007); Parti Québécois (1981–1988)
- Profession: Teacher, educational administrator, political advisor, broadcaster

Michel Gauthier (French pronunciation: [miʃɛl ɡotje]; February 18, 1950 – May 30, 2020) was a Canadian politician, who served as leader of the Bloc Québécois from 1996 to 1997. As the party was the Official Opposition during the 35th Parliament of Canada, this made Gauthier the Leader of the Opposition during his tenure as party leader. He later recanted his sovereignist views when he joined the Conservative Party two years before his death.

== Early life ==
Gauthier was born in Quebec City on February 18, 1950, and was raised in Chambord. His father, Joseph-Georges Tremblay, worked as a motor engine technician; his mother, Cécile (Archambault), was a housewife. Gauthier was a school teacher from 1970 to 1975, educational advisor from 1976 to 1979, then director of education services from 1979 to 1981 at the Roberval school board.

He then served as president of the Tourism Corporation of Chambord in 1975 and in 1976 as president of Chambord Chamber of Commerce in 1977 and 1978.

== Political career ==
Gauthier was first elected as a Member of the National Assembly of Quebec for the Parti Québécois in 1981 for Roberval and was parliamentary secretary to the finance minister from 1983 to 1985. He was re-elected to the legislature in 1985 and served until 1988 when he resigned his seat to become director-general of the Roberval school board.

He won a seat in the House of Commons of Canada as a candidate of the Bloc Québécois in 1993.

Gauthier was not one of the Bloc's better-known Members of Parliament (MPs), but after Lucien Bouchard resigned to become Premier of Quebec, Gauthier won the Bloc Québécois leadership election of 1996, defeating Francine Lalonde. The vote was conducted among members of the party's directorate rather than by all members of the party, and this hurt Gauthier's legitimacy.

Gauthier's lack of profile resulted in some opposition parties mocking him as being the "faceless leader" of the opposition and not up for such a high profile job, as he was largely a political unknown in most of Canada and even in his native Quebec. His leadership was unpopular with the caucus due to his alleged conservative views in a left wing party, and his lack of "charisma or authority" when compared to his predecessor Bouchard. Facing a revolt by his MPs, which culminated in the leaking of confidential caucus discussions, Gauthier resigned in March 1997. He was succeeded by Gilles Duceppe.

As a result of health issues after surgery, he announced in March 2007 that he would not run in the next federal election. He served as BQ House Leader from 1997 until 2007. Gauthier also served as the chief campaign organizer. He formally resigned on July 29, 2007, and became the host of Gauthier, a television news show, which began airing on TQS in September 2007.

On May 12, 2018, Gauthier joined the Conservative Party of Canada after not having been a member of any political party for eleven years. He has also said he was no longer a sovereigntist, though he remained a Quebec nationalist.

== Personal life and death ==
Gauthier was married to Anne Allard until his death. He had two children from a previous marriage (Alexandre and Isabelle).

Gauthier died on May 30, 2020, at the age of 70. He had been suffering from lung cancer in the years leading up to his death.
