= Mario Beaulieu =

Former leader of the Bloc Québécois

Mario Beaulieu MP
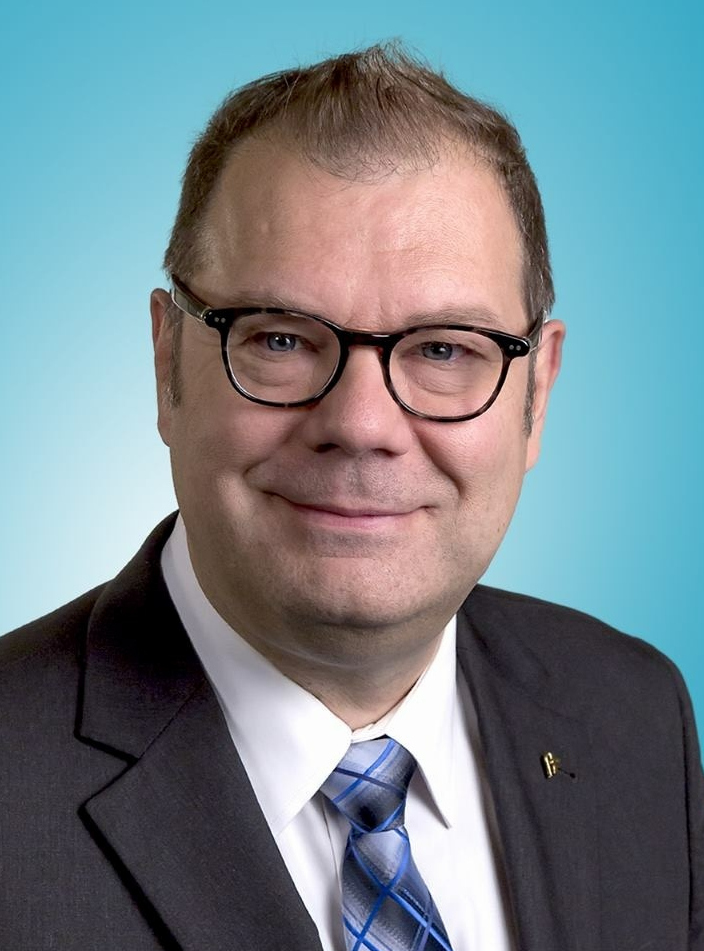
- Beaulieu in 2015

Leader of the Bloc Québécois
- In office June 13, 2018 – January 17, 2019; Interim
- President: Himself; Yves Perron
- Preceded by: Martine Ouellet
- Succeeded by: Yves-François Blanchet
- In office June 25, 2014 – June 10, 2015
- President: Himself
- Preceded by: Daniel Paillé
- Succeeded by: Gilles Duceppe

President of the Bloc Québécois
- In office June 25, 2014 – August 22, 2018
- Leader: Himself; Gilles Duceppe; Rhéal Fortin (interim); Martine Ouellet; Himself (interim)
- Preceded by: Daniel Paillé
- Succeeded by: Yves Perron

President of the Saint-Jean-Baptiste Society of Montreal
- In office 2009–2014
- Preceded by: Jean Dorion
- Succeeded by: Maxime Laporte

Member of Parliament for La Pointe-de-l'Île
- Incumbent
- Assumed office October 19, 2015
- Preceded by: Ève Péclet

Personal details
- Born: February 1, 1959 (age 67) Sherbrooke, Quebec, Canada
- Party: Bloc Québécois (federal); Parti Québécois (provincial)
- Occupation: Politician

Mario A. Beaulieu MP (French pronunciation: [maʁjo boljø]; born February 1, 1959) is a Canadian politician. An advocate for nationalism in Quebec, he served as leader (2014–2015), interim leader (2018–2019) and president (2014–2018) of the Bloc Québécois (BQ); Beaulieu has been the Member of Parliament (MP) for La Pointe-de-l'Île since the 2015 election.

He was the 80th president of the sovereignist Société Saint-Jean-Baptiste of Montreal from 2009 to 2014 and has been a spokesman for the Mouvement Québec français, a coalition of organizations in favour of the preservation and defence of the French language in Quebec.

== Early life and career ==
Mario Beaulieu was born on February 1, 1959, in Sherbrooke; at age four, his family moved to Sainte-Anne-de-Bellevue.

Bealieu was the president of the Parti Québécois's riding association in Montreal Centre from 1997 to 2002 and was an unsuccessful Bloc Québécois candidate in the 1997 federal election, losing to federal cabinet minister Pierre Pettigrew in Papineau—Saint-Denis. He has been a long-time advocate for strengthening measures requiring the predominance of the French language in Quebec, as well as for Quebec independence.

=== Bloc Québécois leader ===
In April 2014, he declared his candidacy for the leadership of the Bloc Québécois and received the endorsement of the executive of the Bloc's youth wing, former Parti Québécois legislative members Bernard Landry and Pierre Curzi, and the former president of the Mouvement Desjardins, Claude Béland. Beaulieu, viewed as a "hardline" sovereigntist, promised to prioritize achieving Quebec independence above everything else. On June 14, 2014, he defeated BQ Member of Parliament André Bellavance for the Bloc leadership with 53.5% of the vote. Beaulieu took office as Bloc leader at the party's convention on June 25, 2014.

Shortly after his election, Beaulieu attracted controversy from within the party due to statements in his acceptance speech associated with the Front de libération du Québec and separate statements seemingly critical about the past leaders of the party, which drew criticism from former Bloc Québécois leader Gilles Duceppe and resulted in two party members announcing their intentions to leave the party. In the weeks following his election, a number of riding executive members quit the party to protest Beaulieu's leadership and a number of individuals who had been considering running for the party in the next election removed themselves from consideration. On August 12, 2014, the party's parliamentary caucus was reduced to 3 MPs after House Leader Jean-François Fortin quit the party to sit as an Independent MP. Fortin said "pushing a unidimensional, intransigent agenda that lacks rigour has put an end to the credibility established by (former leaders) Gilles Duceppe and followed up by Daniel Paillé, two leaders who merit great respect." On August 25, 2014, André Bellavance, who had lost to Beaulieu in the leadership vote also resigned, reducing the Bloc to two MPs. Bellavance told a press conference, in regards to Beaulieu: "His vision and orientation for the Bloc are diametrically opposed to mine. Mr. Beaulieu says he can unite the party; for me it's not the case."

=== Return of Duceppe ===
With the party languishing as it was about to enter the 2015 federal election, Beaulieu entered into discussions with former party leader Gilles Duceppe in hopes of saving the Bloc from extinction. On June 10, 2015, Beaulieu and Duceppe jointly announced that Gilles Duceppe would be returning to lead the party into the election campaign while Beaulieu would relinquish the leadership but remain party president. The party executive agreed on June 9, 2015, to split the positions of president and party leader in order to facilitate Duceppe's return. The changes were ratified by the party's general council on July 1.

=== 2015 election ===
In the 2015 election, Beaulieu was elected in the riding of La Pointe-de-l'Île, the only Bloc MP elected on the island of Montreal. The party returned 10 MPs, but fell short of official party status.

=== Return to Bloc Québécois leadership ===
Beaulieu was one of three Bloc MPs who initially supported Martine Ouellet's leadership during a caucus revolt and remained with the Bloc caucus when seven MPs resigned on February 28, 2018, to sit as Independents. He later became critical of her leadership and campaigned for her removal for an upcoming leadership review, whilst staying in caucus. Beaulieu was named interim leader after Ouellet resigned over losing a party referendum on her leadership.

On August 22, 2018, he ceded the party presidency to Yves Perron as part of an agreement to reunite the party following the conflict over Martine Oulette's leadership. Beaulieu continued as interim leader, however, until a leadership election was held in 2019. On January 17, 2019, he was succeeded as party leader by Yves-François Blanchet.

He served as the critic of Official Languages in the Bloc Québécois Shadow Cabinet of the 44th Parliament of Canada.

He was elected vice chair of the Canadian House of Commons Standing Committee on Official Languages in the 45th Canadian Parliament in 2025.

== Electoral record ==
2025 Canadian federal election: La Pointe-de-l'Île
Party	Candidate	Votes	%	±%
Bloc Québécois	Mario Beaulieu	22,940	43.11	-3.55
Liberal	Viviane Minko	20,051	37.68	+5.37
Conservative	Violetta Potapova	6,781	12.74	+6.04
New Democratic	Ghada Chaabi	2,279	4.28	-5.42
Green	Olivier Huard	977	1.84	N/A
Marxist–Leninist	Geneviève Royer	181	0.34	+0.03
Total valid votes		53,209	98.18	
Total rejected ballots		987	1.82	-0.55
Turnout		54,196	65.03	+2.82
Eligible voters		83,342		
Bloc Québécois hold		Swing		-4.46
Source: Elections Canada
Note: number of eligible voters does not include voting day registrations.

2021 Canadian federal election: La Pointe-de-l'Île
Party	Candidate	Votes	%	±%	Expenditures
Bloc Québécois	Mario Beaulieu	23,835	46.66	-0.1	$40,618.35
Liberal	Jonas Fadeu	16,508	32.32	+1.9	$37,367.99
New Democratic	Alexandre Vallerand	4,954	9.70	-1.2	$0.00
Conservative	Massimo Anania	3,427	6.71	-0.5	$2,567.20
People's	Jonathan Desclin	1,399	2.74	+2.0	$1,481.55
Free	Agnès Falquet	577	1.13	N/A	$604.58
Indépendance du Québec	Charles Phillippe Gervais	221	0.43	±0.0	$0.00
Marxist–Leninist	Genevieve Royer	159	0.31	+0.1	$0.00
Total valid votes/expense limit		51,080	97.63	–	$113,429.83
Total rejected ballots		1,239	2.37		
Turnout		52,319	62.21		
Registered voters		84,099			
Bloc Québécois hold		Swing		-1.0	
Source: Elections Canada

2019 Canadian federal election: La Pointe-de-l'Île
Party	Candidate	Votes	%	±%	Expenditures
Bloc Québécois	Mario Beaulieu	26,010	46.84	+13.26	$38,017.09
Liberal	Jonathan Plamondon	16,898	30.43	+1.86	$50,221.87
New Democratic	Ève Péclet	6,057	10.91	-15.85	$6,545.53
Conservative	Robert Coutu	3,984	7.17	-0.81	$25,219.21
Green	Franco Fiori	1,910	3.44		none listed
People's	Randy Manseau	388	0.70		none listed
Indépendance du Québec	Jacinthe Lafrenaye	199	0.4		$636.28
Marxist–Leninist	Geneviève Royer	88	0.2		$0.00
Total valid votes/expense limit		55,534	100.0		
Total rejected ballots		1,141			
Turnout		56,675	66.2		
Eligible voters		85,589			
Bloc Québécois hold		Swing		+5.70	
Source: Elections Canada

2015 Canadian federal election: La Pointe-de-l'Île
Party	Candidate	Votes	%	±%	Expenditures
Bloc Québécois	Mario Beaulieu	18,545	33.58	+1.21	$48,190.59
Liberal	Marie-Chantale Simard	15,777	28.57	+18.47	$5,384.21
New Democratic	Ève Péclet	14,777	26.76	-20.77	$51,626.51
Conservative	Guy Morissette	4,408	7.98	+0.33	$4,736.10
Green	David J. Cox	1,130	2.05	+0.16	–
Rhinoceros	Ben 97 Benoit	358	0.65	–	$1,062.19
Strength in Democracy	Jean-François Larose	135	0.24	–	–
Marxist–Leninist	Geneviève Royer	96	0.17	–	–
Total valid votes/expense limit		55,226	100.00		$222,699.43
Total rejected ballots		912	1.62	–	
Turnout		56,138	65.43	–	
Eligible voters		84,507			
Bloc Québécois gain from New Democratic		Swing		+10.99	
Source: Elections Canada

1997 Canadian federal election: Papineau—Saint-Denis
Party	Candidate	Votes	%	±%	Expenditures
Liberal	Pierre Pettigrew	26,260	53.90	–	$53,271
Bloc Québécois	Mario Beaulieu	14,083	28.91		$25,032
Progressive Conservative	Yannis Felemegos	6,227	12.78		$19,274
New Democratic	Gaby Kombé	1,196	2.45		$3,030
Marxist–Leninist	Peter Macrisopoulos	481	0.99		$0
Communist League	Michel Dugré	471	0.97		$270
Total valid votes		48,718	100.00		
Total rejected ballots		1,676			
Turnout		50,394	75.55		
Electors on the lists		66,706			
Sources: Official Results, Elections Canada and official contributions and expenses submitted by the candidates, provided by Elections Canada.
