= Francine Lalonde =

Canadian politician (1940–2014)

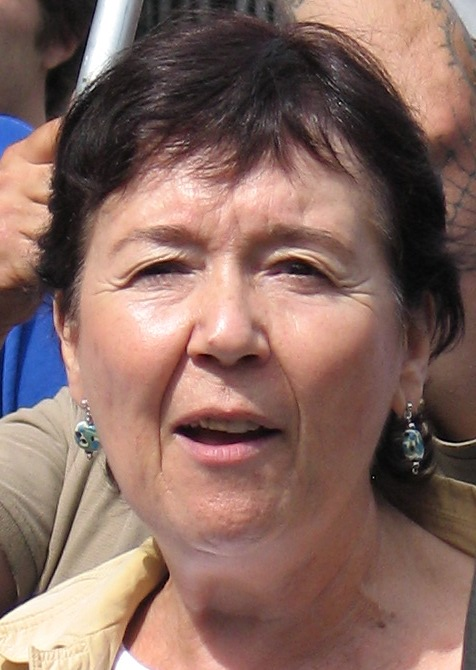

Member of Parliament for La Pointe-de-l'Île (Mercier; 1993–2004)
- In office October 25, 1993 – May 2, 2011
- Preceded by: Carole Jacques
- Succeeded by: Ève Péclet

Personal details
- Born: August 24, 1940 Saint-Hyacinthe, Quebec, Canada
- Died: January 17, 2014 (aged 73) Laval, Quebec, Canada
- Party: Bloc Québécois
- Profession: Politician; lecturer; teacher; unionist

Francine Lalonde (August 24, 1940 – January 17, 2014) was a Canadian politician who served on both the provincial and federal levels. Prior to being elected, she was a lecturer, teacher, and unionist.

She was minister responsible for the status of women in the Lévesque government from January 16, 1985, until June 5, 1985. She resigned following her defeat to Robert Bourassa in the by-election of June 3, 1985, in the electoral district of Bertrand, failing to win a seat in the National Assembly of Quebec.

She was a Bloc Québécois member of the House of Commons of Canada, representing the districts of La Pointe-de-l'Île from 2004 election to 2011, and Mercier from the 1993 election to 2004. She has in the past been the Bloc's critic of Human Resources Development and of Industry, and of Foreign Affairs.

In June 2005, Lalonde introduced in Parliament a private Bill C-407 that would have legalized assisted suicide in Canada. Re-elected in January 2006, she promised to reintroduce her bill to legalize assisted suicide.

On September 13, 2010, Lalonde announced she would not be a candidate for re-election following the expiration of her current mandate "because of the re-emergence of my cancer and the need to pursue new treatments". She died of cancer on January 17, 2014.

== Electoral record ==
2008 Canadian federal election: La Pointe-de-l'Île
| Party | Candidate | Votes | % | ±% | Expenditures |
|---|---|---|---|---|---|
| Bloc Québécois | Francine Lalonde (incumbent) | 25,976 | 56.09 | −4.37 | $54,814 |
| Liberal | Oumy Sarr | 7,403 | 15.99 | +1.88 | $7,501 |
| New Democratic | Isabelle McGuire | 5,975 | 12.90 | +5.89 | none listed |
| Conservative | Hubert Pichet | 5,179 | 11.18 | −4.06 | $49,752 |
| Green | Domita Cundari | 1,340 | 2.89 | −0.29 | none listed |
| Rhinoceros | Ben 97 Benoit | 261 | 0.56 | – | $1,608 |
| Marxist–Leninist | Claude Brunelle | 177 | 0.38 | – | none listed |
| Total valid votes/expense limit | | 46,311 | 100.0 | – | $84,945 |
| Total rejected ballots | | 688 | 1.46 | | |
| Turnout | | 46,999 | 59.46 | −2.86 | |
| Eligible voters | | 79,049 | | | |
Sources: Official Results, Elections Canada and Financial Returns, Elections Canada.

2006 Canadian federal election: La Pointe-de-l'Île
| Party | Candidate | Votes | % | ±% | Expenditures |
|---|---|---|---|---|---|
| Bloc Québécois | Francine Lalonde (incumbent) | 29,368 | 60.46 | −6.01 | $62,051 |
| Conservative | Christian Prévost | 7,402 | 15.24 | +11.00 | $7,391 |
| Liberal | Marie-Migniaud Dominique | 6,855 | 14.11 | −8.82 | $9,649 |
| New Democratic | Nicolas Tremblay | 3,407 | 7.01 | +3.22 | $1,505 |
| Green | Benjamin Rankin | 1,544 | 3.18 | +0.61 | $12 |
| Total valid votes | | 48,576 | 100.00 | | |
| Total rejected ballots | | 739 | | | |
| Turnout | | 49,315 | 62.32 | +3.14 | |
| Electors on the lists | | 79,135 | | | |
Sources: Official Results, Elections Canada and Financial Returns, Elections Canada.

2004 Canadian federal election: La Pointe-de-l'Île
| Party | Candidate | Votes | % | ±% | Expenditures |
|---|---|---|---|---|---|
| Bloc Québécois | Francine Lalonde | 30,713 | 66.47 | +13.35 | $58,592 |
| Liberal | Jean-Claude Gobé | 10,593 | 22.93 | −9.79 | $62,081 |
| Conservative | Christian Prévost | 1,961 | 4.24 | −3.11 | $5,476 |
| New Democratic | André Langevin | 1,751 | 3.79 | +2.69 | none listed |
| Green | André Levert | 1,186 | 2.57 | – | none listed |
| Total valid votes | | 46,204 | 100.00 | | |
| Total rejected ballots | | 1,075 | | | |
| Turnout | | 47,279 | 59.18 | | |
| Electors on the lists | | 79,894 | | | |
Sources: Official Results, Elections Canada and Financial Returns, Elections Canada.

2000 Canadian federal election: Mercier
| Party | Candidate | Votes | % | ±% | Expenditures |
|---|---|---|---|---|---|
| Bloc Québécois | Francine Lalonde | 24,755 | 52.87 | +1.81 | $59,075 |
| Liberal | Normand Biron | 15,416 | 32.93 | +3.81 | $66,350 |
| Green | Richard Savignac | 1,813 | 3.87 | | $3,116 |
| Alliance | J. Marc-Antoine Delsoin | 1,684 | 3.60 | | $365 |
| Progressive Conservative | Martin Gelgoot | 1,629 | 3.48 | −14.13 | none listed |
| Marijuana | Eric Duquette | 937 | 2.00 | – | none listed |
| New Democratic | Nicholas Vikander | 480 | 1.03 | −0.57 | none listed |
| Marxist–Leninist | Geneviève Royer | 104 | 0.22 | −0.40 | $10 |
| Total valid votes | | 46,818 | 100.00 | | |
| Total rejected ballots | | 1,543 | | | |
| Turnout | | 48,361 | 63.27 | −8.50 | |
| Electors on the lists | | 76,437 | | | |
Sources: Official Results, Elections Canada and Financial Returns, Elections Canada.

1997 Canadian federal election: Mercier
| Party | Candidate | Votes | % | ±% | Expenditures |
|---|---|---|---|---|---|
| Bloc Québécois | Francine Lalonde | 24,649 | 51.06 | | $54,212 |
| Liberal | René Bourgeault | 14,061 | 29.12 | – | $43,179 |
| Progressive Conservative | Eric Champagne | 8,500 | 17.61 | | $2,830 |
| New Democratic | Cathy Milner | 772 | 1.60 | | $0 |
| Marxist–Leninist | Hélène Héroux | 297 | 0.62 | | $0 |
| Total valid votes | | 48,279 | 100.00 | | |
| Total rejected ballots | | 2,487 | | | |
| Turnout | | 50,766 | 71.77 | | |
| Electors on the lists | | 70,737 | | | |
Sources: Official Results, Elections Canada and official contributions and expenses submitted by the candidates, provided by Elections Canada.

1993 Canadian federal election
| Party | Candidate | Votes |
|---|---|---|
| Bloc Québécois | Francine Lalonde | 34,139 |
| Liberal | Magda Tadros | 11,700 |
| Independent | Carole Jacques | 8,992 |
| Progressive Conservative | Gérald Lacoste | 2,720 |
| New Democratic | Guy D'Amours, | 789 |
| Abolitionist | William-John Apostol | 207 |
| Commonwealth of Canada | Pierre Aylwin | 128 |

1989 Quebec general election: Saint-Henri
| Party | Candidate | Votes | % |
|---|---|---|---|
| Liberal | Nicole Loiselle | 10,765 | 47.07 |
| Parti Québécois | Francine Lalonde | 10,286 | 44.97 |
| Green | Perceval Shaun | 978 | 4.28 |
| New Democratic | Jean-Pierre Fafard | 530 | 2.32 |
| Workers | Serge Turmel | 180 | 0.79 |
| Marxist–Leninist | Stéphane Chénier | 66 | 0.29 |
| Communist | Joan Doiron | 66 | 0.29 |
| Total valid votes | | 22,871 | 100.00 |
| Rejected and declined votes | | 662 | |
| Turnout | | 23,533 | 70.56 |
| Electors on the lists | | 33,350 | |
Source: Official Results, Le Directeur général des élections du Québec.

Quebec provincial by-election, June 3, 1985: Bertrand
| Party | Candidate | Votes | % |
|---|---|---|---|
| Liberal | Robert Bourassa | 15,490 | 57.97 |
| Parti Québécois | Francine Lalonde | 10,217 | 38.23 |
| Independent | Joseph Arthur Laurent Alie | 408 | 1.53 |
| United Social Credit | Joseph Ranger | 182 | 0.68 |
| Commonwealth of Canada | Paul Rochon | 162 | 0.61 |
| Non-Affiliated | Carolle Caron | 135 | 0.51 |
| Non-Affiliated | Patricia Métivier | 129 | 0.48 |
| Total valid votes | | 26,723 | |
| Rejected and declined votes | | 567 | |
| Turnout | | 27,290 | 68.61 |
| Electors on the lists | | 39,776 | |
Source: Official Results, Government of Quebec

== See also ==
- 1985 Parti Québécois leadership election
- Politics of Quebec
- Quebec sovereignty movement
