= Canadian federal election results in Eastern Montreal =

Electoral history (since 1979)

Liberal
New Democratic
Bloc Québécois
Progressive Conservative (defunct)

Electoral history (1925–1974)
Year	Results
1974	
1972	
1968	
1965	
1963	
1962	
1958	
1957	
1953	
1949	
1945	
1940	
1935	
1930	
1926	
1925	

Canadian federal elections have provided the following results in Eastern Montreal.

== Regional profile ==
The eastern end of the Island of Montreal was the birthplace of the sovereigntist movement, and remained a sovereigntist stronghold for four decades. During this time, whenever the Parti Québécois won provincially, the entire eastern half of the island was coated light blue. Federally, it was the Bloc Québécois's power base from 1993 to 2011, partly due to its leftist bent. With the exception of ethnic areas that protrude from Northern Montreal into the East Island's Honoré-Mercier riding, where Liberal support is strong, the area is relatively homogeneously Francophone and lower-income, a recipe for Bloc dominance. Prior to the rise of the Bloc, the region voted solidly Liberal for decades before being swept up in the Brian Mulroney tide, electing Quebec nationalists under the Progressive Conservative banner. The Conservative Party of Canada has never approached this level of support, and eastern Montreal is currently the weakest region in Canada for the Tories. In 2011, the federalist NDP swept every seat in this region amid the surge of popular support in the province and the concurrent Bloc meltdown, in all but one case by well over 6,000 votes. The NDP surge even cost longtime Bloc leader Gilles Duceppe his seat in Laurier-Sainte-Marie.

The NDP largely held its gains in 2015, losing Honoré-Mercier to the Liberals and La Pointe-de-l'Île—to the Bloc, and Duceppe came up well short in his bid to retake his old riding. In 2019, however, the NDP was cut down to just one riding in eastern Montreal, with the Bloc holding onto La Pointe-de-l'Île and the Liberals taking the other three. Since 2015, it has become almost as Liberal as the rest of the island.

=== Votes by party throughout time ===
Election	Liberal	Conservative	New Democratic	Green	People's	PC	Reform / Alliance	Bloc Québécois	Social Credit	Others
1979	143,504; 63.6%	—N/a	12,062; 5.3%	—N/a	—N/a	26,108; 11.6%	—N/a	—N/a	29,449; 13.0%	14,566; 6.5%
1980	139,703; 71.5%	—N/a	19,492; 10.0%	—N/a	—N/a	15,791; 8.1%	—N/a	—N/a	5,977; 3.1%	14,375; 7.4%
1984	86,474; 37.8%	—N/a	25,425; 11.1%	1,471; 0.6%	—N/a	85,886; 37.5%	—N/a	—N/a	337; 0.1%	29,289; 12.8%
1988	73,696; 31.1%	—N/a	43,512; 18.4%	4,838; 2.0%	—N/a	103,741; 43.8%	—N/a	—N/a	148; 0.1%	11,070; 4.7%
1993	70,884; 28.4%	—N/a	4,964; 2.0%	1,050; 0.4%	—N/a	17,913; 7.2%	—N/a	141,485; 56.7%	—N/a	13,220; 5.3%
1997	81,664; 33.3%	—N/a	6,166; 2.5%	1,167; 0.5%	—N/a	39,023; 15.9%	—N/a	113,004; 46.1%	—N/a	4,202; 1.7%
2000	87,196; 37.8%	—N/a	5,399; 2.3%	5,457; 2.4%	—N/a	9,299; 4.0%	7,505; 3.3%	107,548; 46.6%	—N/a	8,144; 3.5%
2004	64,554; 27.1%	9,504; 4.0%	15,889; 6.7%	8,456; 3.5%	—N/a	—N/a	—N/a	137,602; 57.7%	—N/a	2,445; 1.0%
2006	48,763; 19.7%	29,968; 12.1%	24,915; 10.1%	12,802; 5.2%	—N/a	—N/a	—N/a	128,926; 52.1%	—N/a	1,886; 0.8%
2008	56,972; 23.6%	23,125; 9.6%	34,292; 14.2%	10,873; 4.5%	—N/a	—N/a	—N/a	113,930; 47.1%	—N/a	2,528; 1.0%
2011	33,970; 13.8%	16,874; 6.9%	113,749; 46.2%	4,689; 1.9%	—N/a	—N/a	—N/a	74,554; 30.3%	—N/a	2,375; 1.0%
2015	85,528; 31.5%	18,941; 7.0%	88,890; 32.7%	7,285; 2.7%	—N/a	—N/a	—N/a	67,596; 24.9%	—N/a	3,564; 1.3%
2019	101,331; 37.2%	14,080; 5.2%	60,666; 22.3%	12,665; 4.6%	1,837; 0.7%	—N/a	—N/a	80,163; 29.4%	—N/a	1,807; 0.7%
2021	93,437; 37.9%	14,433; 5.8%	59,602; 24.1%	3,999; 1.6%	5,261; 2.1%	—N/a	—N/a	67,697; 27.4%	—N/a	2,430; 1.0%
2025	119,128; 45.0%	31,612; 11.9%	44,349; 16.8%	5,662; 2.1%	597; 0.2%	—N/a	—N/a	62,099; 23.5%	—N/a	1,111; 0.4%

Liberal
Conservative
New Democratic
Bloc Québécois
Green
Alliance (defunct)
Progressive Conservative (defunct)

== Detailed results ==
=== 2021 ===
==== Seats won/lost by party ====
All incumbents MP were reelected.

==== Party rankings ====
No change in position for the four main parties. The People's Party arrives before the Green Party in 2 of the 3 ridings where both parties had candidates.

Parties	1st	2nd	3rd	4th	5th	6th
Liberal	3	2	0	0	0	0
Bloc Québécois	1	2	2	0	0	0
New Democratic	1	1	2	1	0	0
Conservative	0	0	1	4	0	0
People's	0	0	0	0	3	1
Green	0	0	0	0	2	2

==== Results by riding ====
Electoral district	Candidates								Incumbent
Electoral district	Liberal	Conservative	BQ	NDP	Green	PPC	Marxist-Leninist	Other	Incumbent
Hochelaga	Soraya Martinez Ferrada; 18,197; 38.14%	Aime Calle Cabrera; 2,221; 4.66%	Simon Marchand; 15,089; 31.63%	Catheryn Roy-Goyette; 9,723; 20.38%	Zachary Lavarenne; 965; 2.02%	Marc-André Doucet-Beauchamp; 1,081; 2.27%	Christine Dandenault; 84; 0.18%	Michelle Paquette (Comm.); 108 0.23%	Soraya Martinez Ferrada
Hochelaga	Soraya Martinez Ferrada; 18,197; 38.14%	Aime Calle Cabrera; 2,221; 4.66%	Simon Marchand; 15,089; 31.63%	Catheryn Roy-Goyette; 9,723; 20.38%	Zachary Lavarenne; 965; 2.02%	Marc-André Doucet-Beauchamp; 1,081; 2.27%	Christine Dandenault; 84; 0.18%	Alan Smithee (Rhino.); 238 0.50%	Soraya Martinez Ferrada
Honoré-Mercier	Pablo Rodriguez; 29,033; 59.97%	Guy Croteau; 5,086; 10.51%	Charlotte Lévesque-Marin; 7,908; 16.34%	Paulina Ayala; 3,537; 7.31%	Bianca Deltorto-Russell; 734; 1.52%	Lucilia Miranda; 2,023; 4.18%	Yves Le Seigle; 88; 0.18%		Pablo Rodríguez
La Pointe-de-l'Île	Jonas Fadeu; 16,508; 32.32%	Massimo Anania; 3,427; 6.71%	Mario Beaulieu; 23,835; 46.66%	Alexandre Vallerand; 4,954; 9.70%		Jonathan Desclin; 1,399; 2.74%	Genevieve Royer; 159; 0.31%	Agnès Falquet (FPC); 577 1.13%	Mario Beaulieu
La Pointe-de-l'Île	Jonas Fadeu; 16,508; 32.32%	Massimo Anania; 3,427; 6.71%	Mario Beaulieu; 23,835; 46.66%	Alexandre Vallerand; 4,954; 9.70%		Jonathan Desclin; 1,399; 2.74%	Genevieve Royer; 159; 0.31%	Charles Phillippe Gervais (PIQ); 221 0.43%	Mario Beaulieu
Laurier—Sainte-Marie	Steven Guilbeault; 16,961; 37.96%	Ronan Reich; 1,500; 3.36%	Marie-Eve-Lyne Michel; 9,114; 20.40%	Nimâ Machouf; 14,680; 32.86%	Jean-Michel Lavarenne; 992; 2.22%	Daniel Tanguay; 758; 1.70%	Serge Lachapelle; 70; 0.16%	Cyril Julien (Ind.); 74 0.17%	Steven Guilbeault
Laurier—Sainte-Marie	Steven Guilbeault; 16,961; 37.96%	Ronan Reich; 1,500; 3.36%	Marie-Eve-Lyne Michel; 9,114; 20.40%	Nimâ Machouf; 14,680; 32.86%	Jean-Michel Lavarenne; 992; 2.22%	Daniel Tanguay; 758; 1.70%	Serge Lachapelle; 70; 0.16%	Kimberly Lamontagne (Animal); 199 0.45%	Steven Guilbeault
Laurier—Sainte-Marie	Steven Guilbeault; 16,961; 37.96%	Ronan Reich; 1,500; 3.36%	Marie-Eve-Lyne Michel; 9,114; 20.40%	Nimâ Machouf; 14,680; 32.86%	Jean-Michel Lavarenne; 992; 2.22%	Daniel Tanguay; 758; 1.70%	Serge Lachapelle; 70; 0.16%	Julie Morin (FPC); 233 0.52%	Steven Guilbeault
Laurier—Sainte-Marie	Steven Guilbeault; 16,961; 37.96%	Ronan Reich; 1,500; 3.36%	Marie-Eve-Lyne Michel; 9,114; 20.40%	Nimâ Machouf; 14,680; 32.86%	Jean-Michel Lavarenne; 992; 2.22%	Daniel Tanguay; 758; 1.70%	Serge Lachapelle; 70; 0.16%	Adrien Welsh (Comm.); 95 0.21%	Steven Guilbeault
Rosemont—La Petite-Patrie	Nancy Drolet; 12,738; 23.17%	Surelys Perez Hernandez; 2,199; 4.00%	Shophika Vaithyanathasarma; 11,751; 21.37%	Alexandre Boulerice; 26,708; 48.57%	Franco Fiori; 1,308; 2.38%		Gisèle Desrochers; 284; 0.52%		Alexandre Boulerice

=== 2019 ===
==== Seats won/lost by party ====
Party	2015	Gain from (loss to)						2019
Party	2015	Lib.		Bloc		NDP		2019
New Democratic	3	0	–2	0	0	—		1
Bloc Québécois	1	0	0	—		0	0	1
Liberal	1	—		0	0	+2	0	3

==== Party rankings ====
The Liberal improve their position, winning a majority of the ridings for the first time since 1980. The Bloc overtakes the NDP as the second main party in the region with more second place. The Conservatives obtain a 3rd place in Honoré-Mercier ahead of the NDP who obtains its first 4th place since 2008.

Parties	1st	2nd	3rd	4th	5th
Liberal	3	2	0	0	0
Bloc Québécois	1	2	2	0	0
New Democratic	1	1	2	1	0
Conservative	0	0	1	4	0
Green	0	0	0	0	4

==== Results by riding ====
Electoral district	Candidates								Incumbent
Electoral district	Liberal	Conservative	BQ	NDP	Green	PPC	Marxist-Leninist	Other	Incumbent
Hochelaga	Soraya Martinez Ferrada; 18,008; 33.95%	Christine Marcoux; 2,381; 4.49%	Simon Marchand; 17,680; 33.34%	Catheryn Roy-Goyette; 11,451; 21.59%	Robert D. Morais; 2,618; 4.94%	Stepan Balatsko; 377; 0.71%	Christine Dandenault; 101; 0.19%	Chinook Blais-Leduc (Rhino.); 314; 0.59% JP Fortin (Comm.); 107; 0.20%	Marjolaine Boutin-Sweet
Honoré-Mercier	Pablo Rodriguez; 29,543; 58.66%	Guy Croteau; 4,808; 9.55%	Jacques Binette; 9,979; 19.81%	Chu Anh Pham; 4,130; 8.20%	Domenico Cusmano; 1,373; 2.73%	Patrick St-Onge; 459; 0.91%	Yves Le Seigle; 71; 0.14%		Pablo Rodríguez
La Pointe-de-l'Île	Jonathan Plamondon; 16,898; 30.4%	Robert Coutu; 3,984; 7.2%	Mario Beaulieu; 26,010; 46.8%	Ève Péclet; 6,057; 10.9%	Franco Fiori; 1,910; 3.4%	Randy Manseau; 388; 0.7%	Geneviève Royer; 88; 0.2%	Jacinthe Lafrenaye (PIQ); 199; 0.4%	Mario Beaulieu
Laurier—Sainte-Marie	Steven Guilbeault; 22,306; 41.77%	Lise des Greniers; 1,504; 2.82%	Michel Duchesne; 12,188; 22.82%	Nimâ Machouf; 13,453; 25.19%	Jamil Azzaoui; 3,225; 6.04%	Christine Bui; 320; 0.60%	Serge Lachapelle; 98; 0.18%	Archie Morals (Rhino.); 208; 0.39% Adrien Welsh (Comm.); 67; 0.13% Dimitri Mourkes (Ind.); 42; 0.08%	Hélène Laverdière
Rosemont—La Petite-Patrie	Geneviève Hinse; 14,576; 24.21%	Johanna Sarfati; 1,405; 2.33%	Claude André; 14,306; 23.76%	Alexandre Boulerice; 25,575; 42.48%	Jean Désy; 3,539; 5.88%	Bobby Pellerin; 293; 0.49%	Gisèle Desrochers; 80; 0.13%	Jos Guitare Lavoie (Rhino.); 346; 0.57% Normand Raymond (Comm.); 86; 0.14%	Alexandre Boulerice

=== 2015 ===
==== Seats won/lost by party ====
Party	2011	Gain from (loss to)						2015
Party	2011	Lib.		Bloc		NDP		2015
New Democratic	5	0	–1	0	–1	—		3
Bloc Québécois	0	0	0	—		+1	0	1
Liberal	0	—		0	0	+1	0	1

==== Party rankings ====
The election is much more competitive than previously, with multiple 2nd and 3rd place ranking for both the NDP, the Liberals and the Bloc. The Conservatives are 4th in all 5 ridings as they did in 2011.

Parties	1st	2nd	3rd	4th	5th
New Democratic	3	1	1	0	0
Liberal	1	2	2	0	0
Bloc Québécois	1	2	2	0	0
Conservative	0	0	0	5	0
Green	0	0	0	0	5

==== Results by riding ====
Electoral district	Candidates								Incumbent
Electoral district	Conservative	NDP	Liberal	BQ	Green	Marxist-Leninist	Rhinoceros	Other	Incumbent
Hochelaga (judicial recount)	Alexandre Dang; 3,555; 6.85%	Marjolaine Boutin-Sweet; 16,034; 30.89%	Marwah Rizqy; 15,534; 29.93%	Simon Marchand; 14,389; 27.72%	Anne-Marie Saint-Cerny; 1,654; 3.19%	Christine Dandenault; 148; 0.29%	Nicolas Lemay; 411; 0.79%	Marianne Breton Fontaine (Comm.); 179; 0.34%	Marjolaine Boutin-Sweet
Honoré-Mercier	Guy Croteau; 6,226; 12.05%	Paulina Ayala; 8,478; 16.41%	Pablo Rodriguez; 29,211; 56.55%	Audrey Beauséjour; 6,680; 12.93%	Angela Budilean; 814; 1.58%	Yves Le Seigle; 81; 0.16%		Dayana Dejean (SD); 168; 0.33%	Paulina Ayala
La Pointe-de-l'Île	Guy Morissette; 4,408; 7.98%	Ève Péclet; 14,777; 26.76%	Marie-Chantale Simard; 15,777; 28.57%	Mario Beaulieu; 18,545; 33.58%	David J. Cox; 1,130; 2.05%	Geneviève Royer; 96; 0.17%	Ben 97 Benoit; 358; 0.65%	Jean-François Larose (SD); 135; 0.24%	Ève Péclet
Laurier—Sainte-Marie	Daniel Gaudreau; 2,242; 4.10%	Hélène Laverdière; 20,929; 38.27%	Christine Poirier; 12,938; 23.66%	Gilles Duceppe; 15,699; 28.71%	Cyrille Giraud; 1,904; 3.48%	Serge Lachapelle; 103; 0.19%		Stéphane Beaulieu (Libert.); 604 1.10%	Hélène Laverdière
Laurier—Sainte-Marie	Daniel Gaudreau; 2,242; 4.10%	Hélène Laverdière; 20,929; 38.27%	Christine Poirier; 12,938; 23.66%	Gilles Duceppe; 15,699; 28.71%	Cyrille Giraud; 1,904; 3.48%	Serge Lachapelle; 103; 0.19%		Julien Bernatchez (Ind.); 160 0.29%	Hélène Laverdière
Laurier—Sainte-Marie	Daniel Gaudreau; 2,242; 4.10%	Hélène Laverdière; 20,929; 38.27%	Christine Poirier; 12,938; 23.66%	Gilles Duceppe; 15,699; 28.71%	Cyrille Giraud; 1,904; 3.48%	Serge Lachapelle; 103; 0.19%		Pierre Fontaine (Comm.); 102 0.19%	Hélène Laverdière
Rosemont—La Petite-Patrie	Jeremy Dohan; 2,510; 4.30%	Alexandre Boulerice; 28,672; 49.15%	Nadine Medawar; 12,068; 20.69%	Claude André; 12,283; 21.06%	Sameer Muldeen; 1,783; 3.06%	Stéphane Chénier; 171; 0.29%	Laurent Aglat; 495; 0.85%	Peter d'Entremont (Libert.); 353; 0.61%	Alexandre Boulerice

=== 2011 ===
==== Seats won/lost by party ====
Party	2008	Gain from (loss to)						2011
Party	2008	Lib.		Bloc		NDP		2011
Bloc Québécois	4	0	0	—		0	–4	0
Liberal	1	—		0	0	0	–1	0
New Democratic	0	+1	0	+3	0	—		5

==== Party rankings ====
The NDP surge results in a sweep of the region, with the Bloc and Liberals arriving in 2nd place in their former ridings.

Parties	1st	2nd	3rd	4th	5th
New Democratic	5	0	0	0	0
Bloc Québécois	0	4	1	0	0
Liberal	0	1	4	0	0
Conservative	0	0	0	5	0
Green	0	0	0	0	5

==== Results by riding ====
Electoral district	Candidates								Incumbent
Electoral district	BQ	Conservative	Liberal	NDP	Green	Marxist-Leninist	Rhinoceros	Other	Incumbent
Hochelaga	Daniel Paillé; 14,451; 31.20%	Audrey Castonguay; 3,126; 6.75%	Gilbert Thibodeau; 5,064; 10.93%	Marjolaine Boutin-Sweet; 22,314; 48.17%	Yaneisy Delgado Dihigo; 798; 1.72%	Christine Dandenault; 143; 0.31%	Hugo Samson Veillette (Rhino); 246; 0.53%	Marianne Breton Fontaine (Comm.); 180; 0.39%	Daniel Paillé
Honoré-Mercier	Martin Laroche; 8,935; 18.52%	Gérard Labelle; 5,992; 12.42%	Pablo Rodriguez; 14,641; 30.35%	Paulina Ayala; 17,545; 36.37%	Gaëtan Bérard; 770; 1.60%	Jean-Paul Bédard; 170; 0.35%	Valery Chevrefils-Latulippe; 181; 0.38%		Pablo Rodriguez
La Pointe-de-l'Île	Ginette Beaudry; 15,475; 32.48%	Mathieu Drolet; 3,664; 7.69%	Olivier L. Coulombe; 4,369; 9.17%	Ève Péclet; 23,033; 48.34%	David J. Cox; 898; 1.88%	Claude Brunelle; 213; 0.45%			Francine Lalonde†
Laurier—Sainte-Marie	Gilles Duceppe; 17,991; 35.90%	Charles K. Langford; 1,764; 3.52%	Philippe Allard; 4,976; 9.93%	Hélène Laverdière; 23,373; 46.64%	Olivier Adam; 1,324; 2.64%	Serge Lachapelle; 77; 0.15%	François Yo Gourd; 398; 0.79%	Sylvain Archambault (Comm.); 137 0.27%	Gilles Duceppe
Laurier—Sainte-Marie	Gilles Duceppe; 17,991; 35.90%	Charles K. Langford; 1,764; 3.52%	Philippe Allard; 4,976; 9.93%	Hélène Laverdière; 23,373; 46.64%	Olivier Adam; 1,324; 2.64%	Serge Lachapelle; 77; 0.15%	François Yo Gourd; 398; 0.79%	Dimitri Mourkes (Ind.); 73 0.15%	Gilles Duceppe
Rosemont—La Petite-Patrie	Bernard Bigras; 17,702; 32.85%	Sébastien Forté; 2,328; 4.32%	Kettly Beauregard; 4,920; 9.13%	Alexandre Boulerice; 27,484; 51.00%	Sameer Muldeen; 899; 1.67%	Stéphane Chénier; 140; 0.26%	Jean-Patrick Berthiaume 417; 0.77%		Bernard Bigras

=== 2008 ===
==== Seats won/lost by party ====
Party	2006	Gain from (loss to)				2008
Party	2006	Lib.		Bloc		2008
Bloc Québécois	4	0	0	—		4
Liberal	1	—		0	0	1

==== Party rankings ====
The Liberal vote strengthened since the 2006 election with a 2nd place achieved in all 4 ridings where the Bloc won (very much like in 2000 and 2004). The NDP overtakes the Conservatives for the main third party whereas the Green again arrives in 4th place, ahead of the Conservatives, in Laurier—Sainte-Marie.

Parties	1st	2nd	3rd	4th	5th
Bloc Québécois	4	1	0	0	0
Liberal	1	4	0	0	0
New Democratic	0	0	4	1	0
Conservative	0	0	1	3	1
Green	0	0	0	1	4

==== Results by riding ====
Electoral district	Candidates								Incumbent
Electoral district	BQ	Conservative	Liberal	NDP	Green	Marxist-Leninist	Rhinoceros	Other	Incumbent
Hochelaga	Réal Ménard; 22,720; 49.73%	Luc Labbé; 4,201; 9.20%	Diane Dicaire; 9,442; 20.67%	Jean-Claude Rocheleau; 6,600; 14.45%	Philippe Larochelle; 1,946; 4.26%	Christine Dandenault; 177; 0.39%	Simon Landry; 230; 0.50%	Marianne Breton-Fontaine (Comm.); 184 0.40%	Réal Ménard
Hochelaga	Réal Ménard; 22,720; 49.73%	Luc Labbé; 4,201; 9.20%	Diane Dicaire; 9,442; 20.67%	Jean-Claude Rocheleau; 6,600; 14.45%	Philippe Larochelle; 1,946; 4.26%	Christine Dandenault; 177; 0.39%	Simon Landry; 230; 0.50%	Blair T. Longley (Mar.); 183 0.40%	Réal Ménard
Honoré-Mercier	Gérard Labelle; 13,871; 28.12%	Rodrigo Alfaro; 7,549; 15.30%	Pablo Rodriguez; 21,544; 43.67%	François Pilon; 4,986; 10.11%	Gaëtan Bérard; 1,380; 2.80%				Pablo Rodriguez
La Pointe-de-l'Île	Francine Lalonde; 25,976; 56.09%	Hubert Pichet; 5,179; 11.18%	Oumy Sarr; 7,403; 15.99%	Isabelle Maguire; 5,975; 12.90%	Domita Cundari; 1,340; 2.89%	Claude Brunelle; 177; 0.38%	Ben 97 Benoit; 261; 0.56%		Francine Lalonde
Laurier—Sainte-Marie	Gilles Duceppe; 24,103; 50.24%	Charles K. Langford; 2,320; 4.84%	Sébastien Caron; 8,798; 18.34%	François Grégoire; 8,209; 17.11%	Dylan Perceval-Maxwell; 3,801; 7.92%	Serge Lachapelle; 118; 0.25%	François Yo Gourd; 447; 0.93%	Daniel "F4J" Laforest (Ind.); 93 0.19%	Gilles Duceppe
Laurier—Sainte-Marie	Gilles Duceppe; 24,103; 50.24%	Charles K. Langford; 2,320; 4.84%	Sébastien Caron; 8,798; 18.34%	François Grégoire; 8,209; 17.11%	Dylan Perceval-Maxwell; 3,801; 7.92%	Serge Lachapelle; 118; 0.25%	François Yo Gourd; 447; 0.93%	Samie Pagé-Quirion (Comm.); 86 0.18%	Gilles Duceppe
Rosemont—La Petite-Patrie	Bernard Bigras; 27,260; 52.00%	Sylvie Boulianne; 3,876; 7.39%	Marjorie Théodore; 9,785; 18.67%	Alexandre Boulerice; 8,522; 16.26%	Vincent Larochelle; 2,406; 4.59%	Stéphane Chénier; 170; 0.32%	Jean-Patrick Berthiaume; 319; 0.61%	Michel Dugré (NA); 83; 0.16%	Bernard Bigras

=== 2006 ===
==== Seats won/lost by party ====
Party	2004	Gain from (loss to)				2006
Party	2004	Lib.		Bloc		2006
Bloc Québécois	4	0	0	—		4
Liberal	1	—		0	0	1

==== Party rankings ====
Both the NDP and the Conservatives improves their results with a second place for both, achieved respectively in Laurier—Sainte-Marie in La Pointe-de-l'Île, albeit well behind the Bloc in both cases. They were able to overtake the Liberal Party who arrived third in both ridings. The Green Party arrived fourth, ahead of the Conservatives, in Laurier—Sainte-Marie.

Parties	1st	2nd	3rd	4th	5th
Bloc Québécois	4	1	0	0	0
Liberal	1	2	2	0	0
Conservative	0	1	2	1	1
New Democratic	0	1	1	3	0
Green	0	0	0	1	4

==== Results by riding ====
Electoral district	Candidates								Incumbent
Electoral district	BQ	Liberal	Conservative	NDP	Green	Marijuana	Marxist-Leninist	Other	Incumbent
Hochelaga	Réal Ménard; 25,570; 55.58%	Vicky Harvey; 7,932; 17.24%	Audrey Castonguay; 5,617; 12.21%	David-Roger Gagnon; 4,101; 8.91%	Rolf Bramann; 2,235; 4.86%	Blair T. Longley; 332; 0.72%	Christine Dandenault; 220; 0.48%		Réal Ménard
Honoré-Mercier	Gérard Labelle; 17,879; 34.83%	Pablo Rodriguez; 19,622; 38.23%	Angelo M. Marino; 8,952; 17.44%	François Pilon; 3,191; 6.22%	Sylvain Castonguay; 1,502; 2.93%		Hélène Héroux; 183; 0.36%		Pablo Rodriguez
La Pointe-de-l'Île	Francine Lalonde; 29,368; 60.46%	Marie-Migniaud Dominique; 6,855; 14.11%	Christian Prévost; 7,402; 15.24%	Nicolas Tremblay; 3,407; 7.01%	Benjamin Rankin; 1,544; 3.18%				Francine Lalonde
Laurier—Sainte-Marie	Gilles Duceppe; 26,773; 54.69%	Soeung Tang; 6,095; 12.45%	Carlos De Sousa; 3,124; 6.38%	François Grégoire; 8,165; 16.68%	Dylan Perceval-Maxwell; 4,064; 8.30%	Nicky Tanguay; 338; 0.69%	Ginette Boutet; 137; 0.28%	Jocelyne Leduc (Ind.); 157 0.32%	Gilles Duceppe; Laurier
Laurier—Sainte-Marie	Gilles Duceppe; 26,773; 54.69%	Soeung Tang; 6,095; 12.45%	Carlos De Sousa; 3,124; 6.38%	François Grégoire; 8,165; 16.68%	Dylan Perceval-Maxwell; 4,064; 8.30%	Nicky Tanguay; 338; 0.69%	Ginette Boutet; 137; 0.28%	Evelyn Elizabeth Ruiz (Comm.); 100 0.20%	Gilles Duceppe; Laurier
Rosemont—La Petite-Patrie	Bernard Bigras; 29,336; 55.99%	Suzanne Harvey; 8,259; 15.76%	Michel Sauvé; 4,873; 9.30%	Chantal Reeves; 6,051; 11.55%	Marc-André Gadoury; 3,457; 6.60%	Hugô St-Onge; 419; 0.80%			Bernard Bigras

=== 2004 ===
==== Seats won/lost by party ====
Party	2000	Gain from (loss to)				2004
Party	2000	Lib.		Bloc		2004
Bloc Québécois	4	0	0	—		4
Liberal	1	—		0	0	1

==== Party rankings ====
The NDP greatly improves its results with three 3rd places, being the main third party in the region, behind the Bloc and the Liberals. The Green overtakes the Conservatives in two ridings (Laurier and Rosemont—La Petite-Patrie).

Parties	1st	2nd	3rd	4th	5th
Bloc Québécois	4	1	0	0	0
Liberal	1	4	0	0	0
New Democratic	0	0	3	2	0
Conservative	0	0	2	1	2
Green	0	0	0	2	3

==== Results by riding ====
Electoral district	Candidates								Incumbent
Electoral district	Liberal	BQ	Conservative	NDP	Green	Marijuana	Marxist-Leninist	Communist	Incumbent
Hochelaga	Benoit Bouvier; 11,712; 25.63%	Réal Ménard; 27,476; 60.12%	Mario Bernier; 1,856; 4.06%	David Gagnon; 2,510; 5.49%	Rolf Bramann; 1,361; 2.98%	Antoine Théorêt-Poupart; 482; 1.05%	Christine Dandenault; 112; 0.25%	Pierre Bibeau; 190; 0.42%	Réal Ménard; Hochelaga—Maisonneuve
Honoré-Mercier	Pablo Rodriguez; 22,223; 46.10%	Éric St-Hilaire; 19,461; 40.37%	Gianni Chiazzese; 2,902; 6.02%	François Pilon; 1,973; 4.09%	Richard Lahaie; 852; 1.77%	Steve Boudrias; 626; 1.30%	Hélène Héroux; 164; 0.34%		Yvon Charbonneau†; Anjou—Rivières-des-Prairies
La Pointe-de-l'Île	Jean-Claude Gobé; 10,593; 22.93%	Francine Lalonde; 30,713; 66.47%	Christian Prevost; 1,961; 4.24%	André Langevin; 1,751; 3.79%	Andre Levert; 1,186; 2.57%				Francine Lalonde; Mercier
Laurier	Jean-François Thibault; 8,454; 17.68%	Gilles Duceppe; 28,728; 60.07%	Pierre Albert; 1,224; 2.56%	François Gregoire; 5,779; 12.08%	Dylan Perceval-Maxwell; 2,912; 6.09%	Nicky Tanguay; 572; 1.20%	Ginette Boutet; 154; 0.32%		Gilles Duceppe; Laurier—Sainte-Marie
Rosemont—La Petite-Patrie	Christian Bolduc; 11,572; 22.90%	Bernard Bigras; 31,224; 61.80%	Michel Sauvé; 1,561; 3.09%	Benoît Beauchamp; 3,876; 7.67%	François Chevalier; 2,145; 4.25%			Kenneth Higham; 145; 0.29%	Bernard Bigras; Rosemont—Petite-Patrie

==== Maps ====
1. Hochelaga
2. Honoré-Mercier
3. La Pointe-de-l'Île
4. Laurier
5. Rosemont-La Petite-Patrie
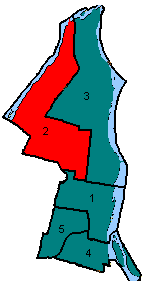
Key map

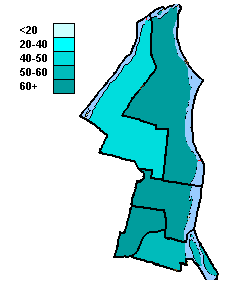
Bloc Québécois

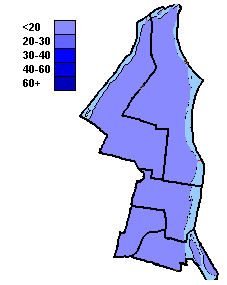
Conservative Party of Canada

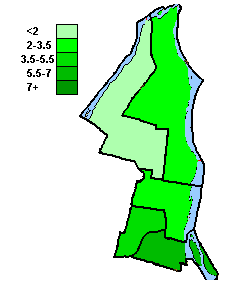
Green Party of Canada

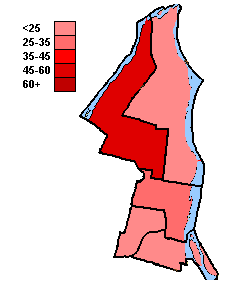
Liberal Party of Canada

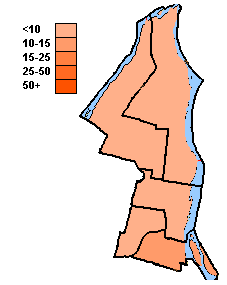
New Democratic Party

=== 2000 ===
==== Seats won/lost by party ====
Party	1997	Gain from (loss to)				2000
Party	1997	Lib.		Bloc		2000
Bloc Québécois	4	0	0	—		4
Liberal	1	—		0	0	1

==== Party rankings ====
The NDP reaches a low point in the region with only a 5th place in Laurier—Sainte-Marie, its best results. It obtains a 7th place in Mercier, behind all the other major federal parties and the Green and Marijuana parties. The Green Party fares quite well and scores two 3rd places despite only running in 3 of the 5 ridings in the region.

Parties	1st	2nd	3rd	4th	5th	6th	7th
Bloc Québécois	4	1	0	0	0	0	0
Liberal	1	4	0	0	0	0	0
Progressive Conservative	0	0	3	0	1	1	0
Green	0	0	2	0	1	0	0
Alliance	0	0	0	3	0	0	2
Marijuana	0	0	0	2	2	1	0
New Democratic	0	0	0	0	1	3	1

==== Results by riding ====
Electoral district	Candidates								Incumbent
Electoral district	BQ	Liberal	Canadian Alliance	NDP	PC	Green	Marijuana	Other	Incumbent
Anjou—Rivière-des-Prairies	Jacques Dagenais; 14,755; 30.35%	Yvon Charbonneau; 28,134; 57.86%	Gianni Chiazzese; 2,005; 4.12%	Bruce Whelan; 624; 1.28%	Michel Tanguay; 2,034; 4.18%		Normand Néron; 918; 1.89%	Hélène Héroux (M-L); 151; 0.31%	Yvon Charbonneau
Hochelaga—Maisonneuve	Réal Ménard; 21,250; 49.20%	Louis Morena; 16,143; 37.38%	Stephanie Morency; 1,502; 3.48%	Milan Mirich; 767; 1.78%	Benoit Harbec; 1,751; 4.05%		Alex Néron; 1,227; 2.84%	Pierre Bibeau (Comm.); 274 0.63% Christine Dandenault (M-L); 275 0.64%	Réal Ménard
Laurier—Sainte-Marie	Gilles Duceppe; 23,473; 52.79%	Jean Philippe Côté; 11,451; 25.75%	Stéphane Prud'homme; 960; 2.16%	Richard Chartier; 2,111; 4.75%	Jean François Tessier; 1,879; 4.23%	Dylan Perceval-Maxwell; 2,169; 4.88%	Marc-Boris St-Maurice; 2,156; 4.85%	Ginette Boutet (M-L); 269; 0.60%	Gilles Duceppe
Mercier	Francine Lalonde; 24,755; 52.87%	Normand Biron; 15,416; 32.93%	J. Marc-Antoine Delsoin; 1,684; 3.60%	Nicholas Vikander; 480; 1.03%	Martin Gelgoot; 1,629; 3.48%	Richard Savignac; 1,813; 3.87%	Eric Duquette; 937; 2.00%	Geneviève Royer (M-L); 104; 0.22%	Francine Lalonde
Rosemont—Petite-Patrie	Bernard Bigras; 23,315; 49.13%	Claude Vigneault; 16,052; 33.83%	Etienne Morin; 1,354; 2.85%	Noémi Lo Pinto; 1,417; 2.99%	Marc Bissonnette; 2,006; 4.23%	Sébastien Chagnon-Jean; 1,475; 3.11%	Claude Messier (Mar.); 1,486; 3.13%	Joanne Pritchard (NA); 114 0.24% Dorothy Sauras (Comm.); 233 0.49%	Bernard Bigras; Rosemont

=== 1997 ===
==== Seats won/lost by party ====
Party	1993	Gain from (loss to)				1997
Party	1993	Lib.		Bloc		1997
Bloc Québécois	5	0	–1	—		4
Liberal	0	—		+1	0	1

==== Results by riding ====
Electoral district	Candidates						Incumbent
Electoral district	BQ	Liberal	NDP	PC	Marxist-Leninist	Other	Incumbent
Anjou—Rivière-des-Prairies	Roger Pomerleau; 16,558	Yvon Charbonneau; 24,189	Elizabeth Lemay Amabili; 752	Jean Corbeil; 9,405	Yves Le Seigle; 227		Roger Pomerleau
Hochelaga—Maisonneuve	Réal Ménard; 21,938	Denise Malo; 16,308	Milan Mirich; 825	Charles Boudreault; 7,583	Christine Dandenault; 444	Richard Lauzon (NLP); 577	Réal Ménard
Laurier—Sainte-Marie	Gilles Duceppe; 26,542	David Ly; 11,154	François Degardin; 2,180	Yanick Deschênes; 5,808	Serge Lachapelle; 338	François Gourd (Ind.); 1,255; Dylan Perceval-Maxwell (Green); 1,167; Mathieu Ravignat (Ind.); 123	Gilles Duceppe
Mercier	Francine Lalonde; 24,649	René Bourgeault; 14,061	Cathy Milner; 772	Eric Champagne; 8,500	Hélène Héroux; 297		Francine Lalonde
Rosemont	Bernard Bigras; 23,313	Françoise Guidi; 15,952	Fidel Fuentes; 1,637	Marc Bissonnette; 7,727	Claude Brunelle; 447	Vicky Mercier (Ind.); 494	Benoît Tremblay†

=== 1993 ===
==== Seats won/lost by party ====
Party	1988	Gain from (loss to)						1993
Party	1988	PC		Lib.		Bloc		1993
Progressive Conservative	4	—		0	0	0	–4	0
Liberal	1	0	0	—		0	–1	0
Bloc Québécois	0	+4	0	+1	0	—		5

==== Results by riding ====
Electoral district	Candidates							Incumbent
Electoral district	PC	Liberal	NDP	BQ	Commonwealth of Canada	Natural Law	Other	Incumbent
Anjou—Rivière-des-Prairies	Jean Corbeil; 7,066	Normand Biron; 25,621	Zamba Mandala; 956	Roger Pomerleau; 26,179	Frantz-Albert Mitton; 139	Gilles Raymond; 764		Jean Corbeil
Hochelaga—Maisonneuve	Allan Koury; 3,838	Jules Léger; 10,760	Paul Vachon; 955	Réal Ménard; 26,052	Steve Bélanger; 184	Richard Lauzon; 576	Christine Dandenault (M-L); 259	Allan Koury
Laurier—Sainte-Marie	Yvan Routhier; 2,136	Robert Desbiens; 9,854	Alain Gravel; 1,227	Gilles Duceppe; 24,755	Sophie Brassard; 124	Pierre Bergeron; 643	John Tromp (Green); 1,050; Normand Chouinard (M-L); 210; Michel Dugré (Ind.); 130	Gilles Duceppe (Note: Elected as independent candidate in the 1990 by-election. The seat was previously held by Liberal Jean-Claude Malépart who died in office in November 1989. Duceppe sat with the Bloc québécois for the remaining of the Parliament.)
Mercier	Gérald Lacoste; 2,720	Magda Tadros; 11,700	Guy D'Amours; 789	Francine Lalonde; 34,139	Pierre Aylwin; 128		Carole Jacques (Ind.); 8,992; William-John Apostol (Abol.); 207	Carole Jacques (Note: Did not seek reelection.)
Rosemont	Pauline Vincent; 2,343	Pierre Bourque; 13,003	Roger Lamarr; 990	Benoît Tremblay; 28,409	Stéphane Levesque; 83	Marc Roy; 717	Hélène Héroux (M-L); 188	Benoît Tremblay (Note: Elected as Progressive Conservative in 1988. Left the PC caucus in 1990 and joined the Bloc later that year.)

=== 1988 ===
==== Seats won/lost by party ====
Party	1984	Gain from (loss to)				1988
Party	1984	PC		Lib.		1988
Progressive Conservative	4	—		0	0	4
Liberal	2	0	0	—		1 (Note: The riding of Saint-Léonard—Anjou was dissolved into Saint-Léonard, presented in Northern Montreal results)

==== Results by riding ====
Electoral district	Candidates								Incumbent
Electoral district	PC	Liberal	NDP	Green	Communist	Rhinoceros	Commonwealth of Canada	Other	Incumbent
Anjou—Rivière-des-Prairies	Jean Corbeil; 27,451	Vincent Arciresi; 17,421	Vincent Marchione; 6,687	Mario Paul; 1,217				Catherine Commandeur (Ind.); 483	Michel Gravel; Gamelin
Hochelaga—Maisonneuve	Allan Koury; 16,246	Serge Laprade; 14,168	Gaétan Nadeau; 8,583	Marius Henry; 800	Montserrat Escola; 114	Marie Chou Chou Chouinard; 1,196	Sylvain Labelle; 122	Christiane Robidoux (Ind.); 159	Édouard Desrosiers
Laurier—Sainte-Marie	Charles-André Hamelin; 12,113	Jean-Claude Malépart; 15,956	François Beaulne; 8,828	Philippe Champagne; 1,438	Marianne Roy; 175	Sonia Chatouille Coté; 2,121	Daniel Gonzales; 79	Hélène Héroux (Ind.); 130	David Berger; Laurier
Laurier—Sainte-Marie	Charles-André Hamelin; 12,113	Jean-Claude Malépart; 15,956	François Beaulne; 8,828	Philippe Champagne; 1,438	Marianne Roy; 175	Sonia Chatouille Coté; 2,121	Daniel Gonzales; 79	Hélène Héroux (Ind.); 130	Merged districts
Laurier—Sainte-Marie	Charles-André Hamelin; 12,113	Jean-Claude Malépart; 15,956	François Beaulne; 8,828	Philippe Champagne; 1,438	Marianne Roy; 175	Sonia Chatouille Coté; 2,121	Daniel Gonzales; 79	Hélène Héroux (Ind.); 130	Jean-Claude Malépart; Montreal—Sainte-Marie
Mercier	Carole Jacques; 30,804	Luc Chouinard; 12,942	André Cordeau; 10,251		André Cloutier; 309	Jean-Claude Stardust Gouin; 1,617	Denise Saint-Louis; 137	Jean-Pierre Ginchereau (Ind.); 197	Carole Jacques; Montreal—Mercier
Rosemont	Benoît Tremblay; 17,127	Jacques Guilbault; 13,209	Giuseppe Sciortino; 9,163	Sylvain Auclair; 1,383	Gaétan Trudel; 151	Christian Nettoyeur Jolicoeur; 1,656	Christiane Deland-Gervais; 120	Suzanne Blais-Grenier (Ind.); 2,060; Dollard Desjardins (Social Credit); 148; Arnold August (Ind.); 122; Léo Larocque (Ind.); 122	Suzanne Blais-Grenier

=== 1984 ===
==== Seats won/lost by party ====
Party	1980	Gain from (loss to)				1984
Party	1980	PC		Lib.		1984
Liberal	6	0	–4	—		2
Progressive Conservative	0	—		+4	0	4

==== Results by riding ====
Electoral district	Candidates							Incumbent
Electoral district	PC	Liberal	NDP	Rhinoceros	Parti nationaliste	Commonwealth of Canada	Other	Incumbent
Gamelin	Michel Gravel; 20,870	Lise Thibault; 17,491	Carl Cyr; 4,730	Jean-Claude Stardust Gouin; 1,659	Henriette Martin; 1,313	Roger Leclerc; 96	Rolf Bramann (Green); 720	Arthur Portelance
Hochelaga—Maisonneuve	Édouard Desrosiers; 13,244	Serge Joyal; 12,201	Marie-Ange Gagnon-Sirois; 3,596	Richard A. Sirois; 1,847	Réal Ménard; 1,089	Daniel Gonzales; 63	Gaetan Trudel (Comm.); 99	Serge Joyal
Laurier	Roland Gagné; 7,720	David Berger; 9,302	Jean-Pierre Juneau; 4,595	François Yo Gourd; 3,247	Jean Saint-Amour; 906	Brian O'Keefe; 130	Robert Silverman (Green); 751; Gilles Côté (Social Credit); 194; Jean Langevin (PCC); 53	David Berger
Montreal—Mercier	Carole Jacques; 25,071	Céline Hervieux-Payette; 19,335	Robert Ferland; 4,925	Raymond les oreilles Pollender; 2,038	Gérald Giguère; 2,557	Michel Destroismaisons; 154		Céline Hervieux-Payette
Montreal—Sainte-Marie	François Richard; 10,668	Jean-Claude Malépart; 13,668	Lauraine Vaillancourt; 3,525		André Vaillancourt; 990	Ghislain Coté; 69		Jean-Claude Malépart; Sainte-Marie
Rosemont	Suzanne Blais-Grenier; 15,782	Antonio Sciascia; 14,477	Roger J.W.D. Lamarre; 4,054	Francine Rose Lime Lacasse; 1,587	Denis Castonguay; 1,008	André Malboeuf; 64	Claude Demers (Comm.); 161; Lucien Lapointe (Social Credit); 143; Dollard Desjardins (Ind.); 101	Claude-André Lachance

=== 1980 ===
==== Results by riding ====
Electoral district	Candidates					Incumbent
Electoral district	Liberal	NDP	PC	Social Credit	Other	Incumbent
Gamelin	Arthur Portelance; 29,232	Mariette Caron-Denis; 4,506	Marius Minier; 3,245	Rodolphe Ouellet; 1,162	2,234	Arthur Portelance
Hochelaga—Maisonneuve	Serge Joyal; 21,138	Marie-Ange Gagnon-Sirois; 2,732	Yves Bourget; 1,977	Roger Hébert; 873	2,094	Serge Joyal
Laurier	David Berger; 16,201	Jean-Pierre Bourdouxhe; 2,216	Marc Legris; 1,572	Edmond-Louis Girard; 534	3,780	David Berger
Mercier	Céline Hervieux-Payette; 27,428	Pierre Dubé; 4,258	Jacques Coutu; 3,161	Claude Bélanger; 1,891	2,142	Céline Hervieux-Payette
Rosemont	Claude-André Lachance; 26,544	Marcel Julien; 3,337	Léon Vellone; 2,260	Yvette Gosselin; 912	1,936	Claude-André Lachance
Sainte-Marie	Jean-Claude Malépart; 19,160	Jean-Pierre Juneau; 2,443	André Payette; 3,576	Gaston Pleau; 605	2,189	Jean-Claude Malépart

=== 1979 ===
==== Results by riding ====
Electoral district	Candidates					Incumbent
Electoral district	Liberal	Social Credit	PC	NDP	Other	Incumbent
Gamelin	Arthur Portelance; 30,567	Jean-Guy Daoust; 5,247	Robert Letendre; 4,711	Danielle Dubois; 2,753	1,720	Arthur Portelance
Hochelaga—Maisonneuve	Serge Joyal; 21,059	André Aubry; 3,769	André Coutu; 3,605	Marie-Ange Gagnon-Sirois; 1,746	3,844	Serge Joyal; Maisonneuve—Rosemont
Hochelaga—Maisonneuve	Serge Joyal; 21,059	André Aubry; 3,769	André Coutu; 3,605	Marie-Ange Gagnon-Sirois; 1,746	3,844	Merged districts
Hochelaga—Maisonneuve	Serge Joyal; 21,059	André Aubry; 3,769	André Coutu; 3,605	Marie-Ange Gagnon-Sirois; 1,746	3,844	Jacques Lavoie (Note: Elected as a Progressive Conservative in a by-election in 1975 to replace Gérard Pelletier (Liberal). Crossed the floor to the Liberal caucus in 1977.); Hochelaga
Laurier	David Berger; 17,366	Gérard Baillarger; 3,250	Yvon Lanthier; 2,790	Jean-Pierre Bourdouxhe; 1,934	3,269	Fernand Leblanc
Mercier	Céline Hervieux-Payette; 26,784	Lise Lajeunesse; 10,328	Jacques Coutu; 5,076	Elizabeth Chase-Chapdelaine; 1,816	1,448	Prosper Boulanger
Rosemont	Claude-André Lachance; 28,116	Emery Whalen; 3,919	Léon Vellone; 3,129	Marcel Julien; 2,238	2,195	Claude-André Lachance; Lafontaine
Sainte-Marie	Jean-Claude Malépart; 19,612	Gaston Pleau; 2,936	André Payette; 6,797	Jean-Pierre Juneau; 1,575	2,090	Raymond Dupont; Sainte-Marie
