= Serge Joyal =

Canadian politician

The Honourable Serge Joyal PC, CC, OQ

Secretary of State for Canada
- In office October 6, 1982 – September 16, 1984
- Prime Minister: Pierre Trudeau; John Turner
- Preceded by: Gerald Regan
- Succeeded by: Walter McLean

Canadian Senator for Quebec
- In office November 26, 1997 – January 31, 2020
- Nominated by: Jean Chrétien
- Appointed by: Roméo LeBlanc
- Preceded by: Guy Charbonneau
- Succeeded by: Clément Gignac (2021)

Member of Parliament for Hochelaga—Maisonneuve (Maisonneuve—Rosemont; 1974–1979)
- In office July 8, 1974 – September 4, 1984
- Preceded by: J. Antonio Thomas
- Succeeded by: Allan Koury

Personal details
- Born: February 1, 1945 (age 81) Montreal, Quebec, Canada
- Party: Progressive Senate Group (2019–2020)
- Other political affiliations: Independent Liberal (2014–2019); Liberal (until 2014)

Serge Joyal PC CC OQ (born February 1, 1945) is a Canadian politician who served in the House of Commons of Canada from 1974 to 1984 and subsequently in the Senate of Canada from 1997 to 2020.

== Career ==
A lawyer by profession, Joyal served as vice-president of the Quebec wing of the Liberal Party of Canada. He was first elected to the House of Commons of Canada in the 1974 general election and remained a Liberal member of Parliament for ten years.

In 1978, Joyal, along with a group of concerned Montreal citizens that included Nick Auf der Maur and Robert Keaton, co-founded the Municipal Action Group ("MAG"). Joyal was particularly well known at the time for having supported L’Association des gens de l’air, a group which was criticizing the lack of spoken French by airport controllers. Joyal led the newly formed MAG and ran for mayor against the incumbent, Jean Drapeau. MAG succeeded in electing one member to Montreal council (auf der Maur), but Drapeau's party won 52 seats. As Joyal had not resigned his federal seat, he returned to Ottawa.

Following the 1980 general election, Joyal served as co-chair of the Joint Committee on the Patriation of the Canadian Constitution. In 1981, he joined the Cabinet of Prime Minister Pierre Trudeau as a Minister of State. He was appointed Secretary of State for Canada in 1982. When John Turner succeeded Trudeau in June 1984, Joyal remained in cabinet as Secretary of State. Joyal lost his seat in the 1984 election that defeated the Turner government. On November 26, 1997, Joyal was appointed to the Senate of Canada on the recommendation of Prime Minister Jean Chrétien and served on a number of committees specialising in legal and constitutional affairs.

With the Senate Liberal Caucus facing losing official parliamentary caucus status in 2020 with a third of its caucus facing mandatory retirements on their turning age 75, Senator Joseph Day announced that the Senate Liberal Caucus had been dissolved and a new Progressive Senate Group formed in its wake, with the entire membership joining the new group, including Joyal.

Joyal was appointed to the Order of Canada in 1996 and was raised to the rank of Companion of the Order in 2023. He is an Officer of the National Order of Quebec and is also a Chevalier in France's Légion d’Honneur. He is an expert art collector and appraiser. In recent years, he has used his knowledge of the art world and his influence on the Senate and the government to get Parliament to assemble a collection of original portraits of the kings of France for the period during which Canada was first explored and colonized by France. In 2004, these paintings were placed on the walls of the Salon de la Francophonie, featured in the Centre Block of the Parliament Buildings, as companions to the portraits of the British and then Canadian monarchs who had been the sovereigns of the territories forming Canada since 1763.

He retired from the Senate reaching the age of 75, after more than 22 years of representing Kennebec on January 31, 2020.

== Electoral record ==
1984 Canadian federal election: Hochelaga—Maisonneuve
Party	Candidate	Votes
Progressive Conservative	Édouard Desrosiers	13,244
Liberal	Serge Joyal	12,201
New Democratic	Marie-Ange Gagnon-Sirois	3,596
Rhinoceros	Richard A. Sirois	1,847
Parti nationaliste	Réal Ménard	1,089
Communist	Gaetan Trudel	99
Commonwealth of Canada	Daniel Gonzales	63

1980 Canadian federal election: Hochelaga—Maisonneuve
Party	Candidate	Votes
Liberal	Serge Joyal	21,138
New Democratic	Marie-Ange Gagnon-Sirois	2,732
Progressive Conservative	Yves Bourget	1,977
Rhinoceros	Diane Gougeon	1,412
Social Credit	Roger Hébert	873
Not affiliated	Robert Coté	286
Independent	Jacques Beaudoin	200
Marxist–Leninist	Pierre Chenier	98
Union populaire	Sylvain Morissette	98

1979 Canadian federal election: Hochelaga—Maisonneuve
Party	Candidate	Votes	%
Liberal	Serge Joyal	21,059	61.90
Social Credit	André Aubry	3,769	11.08
Progressive Conservative	André Coutu	3,605	10.60
Independent	Jacques Lavoie	1,837	5.40
New Democratic	Marie-Ange Gagnon-Sirois	1,746	5.13
Rhinoceros	Daniel Bouf Bouf Bouffard	1,097	3.22
Union populaire	Reggie Chartrand	644	1.89
Marxist–Leninist	Pierre Chénier	114	0.34
Communist	Danielle Ferland	92	0.27
Revolutionary Workers League	Michel Dugré	60	0.18
Total valid votes		34,023	100.00
Total rejected ballots		1,077	
Turnout		35,100	68.78
Electors on the lists		51,034	
Source: Report of the Chief Electoral Officer, Thirty-first General Election, 1979.

1978 Montreal municipal election: Mayor of Montreal
Party	Candidate	Votes	%
Civic Party of Montreal	Jean Drapeau (incumbent)	212,345	60.89
Municipal Action Group	Serge Joyal	89,173	25.57
Montreal Citizens' Movement	Guy Duquette	43,522	12.48
Independent	Louis Gervais	1,963	0.56
Independent	Mariette Lapierre	1,755	0.50
Total valid votes		348,758	100
Source: Election results, 1833-2005 (in French), City of Montreal. Party identifications are taken from Le Devoir, 11 November 1978.

1974 Canadian federal election: Maisonneuve—Rosemont
Party	Candidate	Votes
Liberal	Serge Joyal	13,817
Progressive Conservative	Lise Bourque	6,053
Social Credit	Gilles Morissette	2,783
New Democratic	Lionel J. Desjardins	2,186
Communist	Bernadette Le Brun	200
Marxist–Leninist	Mario Verrier	156
