= Jean-Paul Deschatelets =

Canadian politician

The Honourable Jean-Paul Deschatelets PC QC

Speaker of the Senate of Canada
- In office September 5, 1968 – December 13, 1972
- Nominated by: Pierre Trudeau
- Appointed by: Roland Michener
- Preceded by: Sydney John Smith
- Succeeded by: Muriel McQueen Fergusson

Minister of Public Works
- In office April 22, 1963 – February 11, 1965
- Prime Minister: Lester B. Pearson
- Preceded by: Davie Fulton
- Succeeded by: Lucien Cardin

Senator for Lauzon, Quebec
- In office February 24, 1966 – January 10, 1986
- Appointed by: Lester B. Pearson
- Preceded by: Léonard Tremblay
- Succeeded by: Michel Cogger

Member of Parliament for Maisonneuve—Rosemont
- In office August 10, 1953 – November 7, 1965
- Preceded by: Sarto Fournier
- Succeeded by: J. Antonio Thomas

Personal details
- Born: October 9, 1912 Montreal, Quebec, Canada
- Died: December 11, 1986 (aged 74) Montreal, Quebec, Canada
- Resting place: Notre Dame des Neiges Cemetery
- Party: Liberal
- Spouse: Fernande Dufresne (m. 1939)
- Children: 3
- Education: Collège Sainte-Marie (BA); University of Montreal (LLB)
- Profession: Lawyer

Jean-Paul Deschatelets PC QC (October 9, 1912 – December 11, 1986) was a Canadian parliamentarian.

Born in Montreal, Quebec, he was first elected to the House of Commons of Canada in 1953 as a Liberal Member of Parliament for the riding of Maisonneuve—Rosemont. He was re-elected in 1957, 1958, 1962, and 1963. He was Minister of Public Works from 1963 to 1965.

In 1966, he was appointed to the Senate representing the senatorial division of Lauzon, Quebec. He resigned in January 1986. He was the Speaker of the Senate of Canada from 1968 to 1972.

After his death in 1986, he was entombed at the Notre Dame des Neiges Cemetery in Montreal.
