= Réal Ménard =

Canadian politician

Borough Mayor of Mercier-Hochelaga-Maisonneuve and Montreal City Councillor
- In office January 1, 2010 – November 16, 2017
- Preceded by: Lyn Thériault
- Succeeded by: Pierre Lessard-Blais

Member of Parliament for Hochelaga (Hochelaga—Maisonneuve; 1993–2004)
- In office October 25, 1993 – September 16, 2009
- Preceded by: Allan Koury
- Succeeded by: Daniel Paillé

Personal details
- Born: May 13, 1962 (age 64) Montreal, Quebec, Canada
- Party: Bloc Québécois; Coalition Montréal; Vision Montréal (formerly)
- Profession: Political scientist

Réal Ménard (born May 13, 1962) is a Canadian politician, who was a Bloc Québécois member of the House of Commons of Canada from 1993 to 2009. He was the second Canadian member of Parliament to come out as gay.

Ménard is a political scientist with B.A. and M.A. degrees and also holds his law degree from the University of Ottawa.

== Federal politics ==
He first stood for federal office in the 1984 federal election as candidate for the small Parti nationaliste du Québec in Hochelaga—Maisonneuve. Defeated in this first try, he contested the riding in the 1993 election for the new and larger Bloc Québécois. He was elected, and re-elected in the riding in the 1997 and 2000 elections. Following redistricting, he was re-elected in the new riding of Hochelaga in the 2004, 2006 and 2008 federal elections.

Early in his parliamentary career, he served variously as Bloc critic for Health, for science, research and development, for Labour, for National Defence, and for the Federal Office of Regional Development-Quebec. From 1998 to June 29, 1999, he was critic for Citizenship and Immigration and for public housing; he then returned as health critic and served as vice-chair of the Standing Committee for three sessions. On September 14, 2001, he took on additional critic responsibility for the Montreal region.

On February 15, 1994, Ménard was the first member in the house of commons to use the word 'internet' saying "in building the electronic highway, the government will respect areas of provincial jurisdiction and ensure that communications linking us to Internet are also in French"

In March 2006 he was shuffled from the health critic position to become the Bloc Québécois justice critic.

== Municipal politics ==
In June 2009, Ménard announced that he was resigning from the House of Commons, effective September 16, in order to run as a Vision Montreal candidate for borough mayor of Mercier–Hochelaga-Maisonneuve in Montreal's 2009 municipal election. Prior to his first election to the House of Commons, he was a political assistant to Louise Harel, Vision Montreal's 2009 candidate for Mayor of Montreal, when she was a provincial MNA.

He won election to the borough mayoralty on November 1, 2009.

== Electoral record (incomplete) ==
Municipal

2009 Montreal municipal election: Borough Mayor, Mercier–Hochelaga-Maisonneuve
| Party | Candidate | Votes | % |
|---|---|---|---|
| Vision Montreal | Réal Ménard | 20,103 | 52.53 |
| Projet Montréal | Ann Julie Fortier | 9,640 | 25.19 |
| Union Montreal | Claire St-Arnaud | 8,528 | 22.28 |
| Total valid votes | | 38,271 | 100 |
Source: Municipal Election Results, 2009, City of Montreal.

Federal

2008 Canadian federal election: Hochelaga
| Party | Candidate | Votes | % | ±% | Expenditures |
|---|---|---|---|---|---|
| Bloc Québécois | Réal Ménard | 22,720 | 49.73 | −5.85 | $28,893 |
| Liberal | Diane Dicaire | 9,442 | 20.67 | +3.43 | not listed |
| New Democratic | Jean-Claude Rocheleau | 6,600 | 14.45 | +5.54 | $21,479 |
| Conservative | Luc Labbé | 4,201 | 9.20 | −3.01 | $8,586 |
| Green | Philippe Larochelle | 1,946 | 4.26 | −0.60 | not listed |
| neorhino.ca | Simon Landry | 230 | 0.50 | – | not listed |
| Communist | Marianne Breton Fontaine | 184 | 0.40 | | $898 |
| Marijuana | Blair T. Longley | 183 | 0.40 | −0.32 | not listed |
| Marxist–Leninist | Christine Dandenault | 177 | 0.39 | −0.09 | not listed |
| Total valid votes | | 45,683 | 100.00 | | |
| Total rejected ballots | | 644 | | | |
| Turnout | | 46,327 | 58.24 | −0.07 | |
| Electors on the lists | | 79,542 | | | |
Sources: Official Results, Elections Canada and Financial Returns, Elections Canada.

2006 Canadian federal election: Hochelaga
| Party | Candidate | Votes | % | ±% | Expenditures |
|---|---|---|---|---|---|
| Bloc Québécois | Réal Ménard | 25,570 | 55.58 | −4.54 | $25,836 |
| Liberal | Vicky Harvey | 7,932 | 17.24 | −8.39 | $10,318 |
| Conservative | Audrey Castonguay | 5,617 | 12.21 | +8.15 | $30,705 |
| New Democratic | David-Roger Gagnon | 4,101 | 8.91 | +3.42 | $2,780 |
| Green | Rolf Bramann | 2,235 | 4.86 | +1.88 | none listed |
| Marijuana | Blair T. Longley | 332 | 0.72 | −0.33 | none listed |
| Marxist–Leninist | Christine Dandenault | 220 | 0.48 | +0.23 | none listed |
| Total valid votes | | 46,007 | 100.00 | | |
| Total rejected ballots | | 723 | | | |
| Turnout | | 46,730 | 58.31 | +0.52 | |
| Electors on the lists | | 80,142 | | | |
Sources: Official Results, Elections Canada and Financial Returns, Elections Canada.

2004 Canadian federal election: Hochelaga
| Party | Candidate | Votes | % | ±% | Expenditures |
|---|---|---|---|---|---|
| Bloc Québécois | Réal Ménard | 27,476 | 60.12 | +9.60 | $35,055 |
| Liberal | Benoit Bouvier | 11,712 | 25.63 | −10.06 | $22,566 |
| New Democratic | David Gagnon | 2,510 | 5.49 | +3.55 | $695 |
| Conservative | Mario Bernier | 1,856 | 4.06 | −3.33 | $2,131 |
| Green | Rolf Bramann | 1,361 | 2.98 | | $963 |
| Marijuana | Antoine Théorêt-Poupart | 482 | 1.05 | – | none listed |
| Communist | Pierre Bibeau | 190 | 0.42 | | $647 |
| Marxist–Leninist | Christine Dandenault | 112 | 0.25 | | none listed |
| Total valid votes | | 45,699 | 100.00 | | |
| Total rejected ballots | | 936 | | | |
| Turnout | | 46,635 | 57.79 | | |
| Electors on the lists | | 80,702 | | | |
Percentage change figures are factored for redistribution. Conservative Party percentages are contrasted with the combined Canadian Alliance and Progressive Conservative figures from 2000. Sources: Official Results, Elections Canada and Financial Returns, Elections Canada.

2000 Canadian federal election: Hochelaga—Maisonneuve
| Party | Candidate | Votes | % | ±% | Expenditures |
|---|---|---|---|---|---|
| Bloc Québécois | Réal Ménard | 21,250 | 49.20 | +3.18 | $59,310 |
| Liberal | Louis Morena | 16,143 | 37.38 | +3.17 | $52,743 |
| Progressive Conservative | Benoit Harbec | 1,751 | 4.05 | −11.86 | $497 |
| Alliance | Stephanie Morency | 1,502 | 3.48 | | $365 |
| Marijuana | Alex Néron | 1,227 | 2.84 | – | none listed |
| New Democratic | Milan Mirich | 767 | 1.78 | +0.05 | none listed |
| Marxist–Leninist | Christine Dandenault | 275 | 0.64 | −0.29 | $10 |
| Communist | Pierre Bibeau | 274 | 0.63 | | $187 |
| Total valid votes | | 43,189 | 100.00 | | |
| Total rejected ballots | | 1,385 | | | |
| Turnout | | 44,574 | 58.69 | −13.87 | |
| Electors on the lists | | 75,947 | | | |
Sources: Official Results, Elections Canada and Financial Returns, Elections Canada.

1997 Canadian federal election: Hochelaga—Maisonneuve
| Party | Candidate | Votes | % | ±% | Expenditures |
|---|---|---|---|---|---|
| Bloc Québécois | Réal Ménard | 21,938 | 46.02 | | $51,213 |
| Liberal | Denise Malo | 16,308 | 34.21 | – | $32,101 |
| Progressive Conservative | Charles Boudreault | 7,583 | 15.91 | | $2,329 |
| New Democratic | Milan Mirich | 825 | 1.73 | | $0 |
| Natural Law | Richard Lauzon | 577 | 1.21 | | $0 |
| Marxist–Leninist | Christine Dandenault | 444 | 0.93 | | $142 |
| Total valid votes | | 47,675 | 100.00 | | |
| Total rejected ballots | | 2,188 | | | |
| Turnout | | 49,863 | 72.56 | | |
| Electors on the lists | | 68,720 | | | |
Sources: Official Results, Elections Canada and official contributions and expenses submitted by the candidates, provided by Elections Canada.

1993 Canadian federal election: Hochelaga—Maisonneuve
| Party | Candidate | Votes | % | ±% | Expenditures |
|---|---|---|---|---|---|
| Bloc Québécois | Réal Ménard | 26,170 | 61.37 | | $31,198 |
| Liberal | Jules Léger | 10,675 | 25.03 | – | $11,028 |
| Progressive Conservative | Allan Koury | 3,723 | 8.73 | | $43,692 |
| New Democratic | Paul Vachon | 1,050 | 2.46 | | $2,715 |
| Natural Law | Richard Lauzon | 588 | 1.38 | | $15 |
| Marxist–Leninist | Christine Dandenault | 259 | 0.61 | | $80 |
| Commonwealth of Canada | Steve Bélanger | 180 | 0.42 | | $0 |
| Total valid votes | | 42,645 | 100.00 | | |
| Total rejected ballots | | 1,857 | | | |
| Turnout | | 44,502 | 74.24 | | |
| Electors on the lists | | 59,945 | | | |
Source: Thirty-fifth General Election, 1993: Official Voting Results, Published by the Chief Electoral Officer of Canada. Financial figures taken from the official contributions and expenses submitted by the candidates, provided by Elections Canada.

1984 Canadian federal election
| Party | Candidate | Votes |
|---|---|---|
| Progressive Conservative | Édouard Desrosiers | 13,244 |
| Liberal | Serge Joyal | 12,201 |
| New Democratic | Marie-Ange Gagnon-Sirois | 3,596 |
| Rhinoceros | Richard A. Sirois | 1,847 |
| Parti nationaliste | Réal Ménard | 1,089 |
| Communist | Gaetan Trudel | 99 |
| Commonwealth of Canada | Daniel Gonzales | 63 |
