= Marcel Faribault =

Canadian politician (1908-1972)

Member of the Legislative Council of Quebec for Repentigny
- In office 1967–1968
- Preceded by: Édouard Masson
- Succeeded by: Institution abolished in 1968

Personal details
- Born: October 8, 1908 Montreal, Quebec
- Died: May 26, 1972 (aged 63) Outremont, Quebec
- Resting place: Notre Dame des Neiges Cemetery
- Party: Union Nationale

Marcel Faribault, CC (October 8, 1908 – May 26, 1972) was a Canadian notary, businessman and administrator.

== Background ==
Born in Montreal, he was the son of René Faribault and Anna Pauzé and was educated at the Université de Montréal. A successful notary, he became president of Trust Général du Canada. He died in Outremont, on May 26, 1972, and was interred in the Notre Dame des Neiges Cemetery.

== Legislative Council of Quebec ==
He was appointed to the Legislative Council of Quebec by Premier Daniel Johnson Sr. in 1967 and supported the Union Nationale.

== Federal politics ==
In the 1968 Canadian federal election, Faribault was the Quebec lieutenant to Progressive Conservative Party of Canada leader Robert Stanfield and an unsuccessful candidate in the Gamelin riding.

== Honours ==
In 1971 he was made a Companion of the Order of Canada.

After his death in 1972, he was entombed at the Notre Dame des Neiges Cemetery in Montreal.
