= Sarto Fournier =

Canadian politician (1908–1980)

The Honourable Sarto Fournier
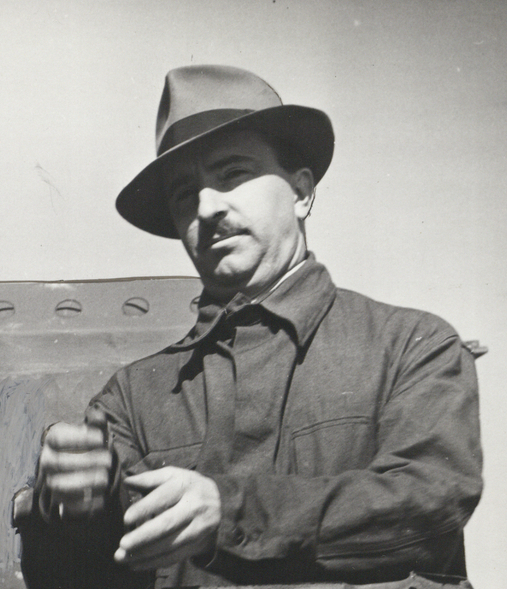
- Fournier in 1942

38th Mayor of Montreal
- In office 1957–1960
- Preceded by: Jean Drapeau
- Succeeded by: Jean Drapeau

Member of the Canadian Parliament for Maisonneuve—Rosemont
- In office 1935–1953
- Preceded by: riding created
- Succeeded by: Jean-Paul Deschatelets

Senator for De Lanaudière, Quebec
- In office 1953–1980
- Appointed by: Louis St. Laurent
- Preceded by: Édouard-Charles St-Père
- Succeeded by: Thomas Lefebvre

Personal details
- Born: 15 February 1908 East Broughton, Quebec, Canada
- Died: 23 July 1980 (aged 72) Ottawa, Ontario, Canada
- Party: Liberal (federal); Ralliment du Grand Montréal (municipal)
- Spouse(s): Elizabeth Lamoureux (m. 17 September 1938)
- Profession: lawyer

Sarto Fournier (15 February 1908 – 23 July 1980) was a Canadian politician. He served as mayor of Montreal from 1957 to 1960.

== Biography ==
Born in East Broughton, Quebec to a family of Quebecois and Italian-Canadian origin, he graduated in law from McGill University and formally entered law practice in 1938. Fournier was first elected to the House of Commons of Canada as a Liberal in the 1935 election and was subsequently re-elected in 1940, 1945, and 1949. He became the youngest member of the Senate in 1953 and served until his death.

He studied law at McGill University and at the Université de Montréal. He was only 27 when he became the Liberal MP for Maisonneuve-Rosemont. He was re-elected in 1940, 1945, and 1949. He was called to the bar in 1938. In 1953, he entered the senate, called by Prime Minister Louis Saint-Laurent.

After two previous attempts in 1950 and 1954, he was elected mayor of Montreal in 1957. He initiated the Expo 67 project.

He had been interested in municipal politics since 1950. Although he ran for mayor five times between 1950 and 1962, he won only once, in 1957, against Jean Drapeau. At this election, Fournier was heading a new municipal party, the Ralliement du Grand Montréal (Greater Montreal Movement), which brought together Drapeau's opponents. Fournier took also advantage of the support of Québec's premier, Maurice Duplessis.

During his term as mayor, Fournier confined himself to representative functions and acted more as a spectator, mainly because Drapeau's Civic Action League still held a majority on city council. Partly due to this, Drapeau, now running under the banner of the Civic Party of Montreal, defeated him in a 1960 rematch.

His administration was especially marked by the opening of the St. Lawrence Seaway, the Boulevard Métropolitain and the candidacy of Montréal for the 1967 World's Fair. After his attempts to run for mayor, Fournier decided to return to the Senate.
