= Gamelin (electoral district) =

Former federal electoral district in Quebec, Canada

Quebec electoral district

Defunct federal electoral district
- Legislature: House of Commons
- District created: 1966
- District abolished: 1987
- First contested: 1968
- Last contested: 1984

Gamelin was a federal electoral district in Quebec, Canada, that was represented in the House of Commons of Canada from 1968 to 1988. This riding was created in 1966 from parts of Maisonneuve—Rosemont and Mercier ridings. It was abolished in 1987 when redistributed into Anjou—Rivière-des-Prairies, Hochelaga—Maisonneuve, Mercier and Saint-Léonard ridings.

== Members of Parliament ==
This riding elected the following members of Parliament:

Parliament	Years	Member	Party
Gamelin; Riding created from Maisonneuve—Rosemont and Mercier
28th	1968–1972	Arthur Portelance	Liberal
29th	1972–1974	Arthur Portelance	Liberal
30th	1974–1979	Arthur Portelance	Liberal
31st	1979–1980	Arthur Portelance	Liberal
32nd	1980–1984	Arthur Portelance	Liberal
33rd	1984–1988	Michel Gravel	Progressive Conservative
Riding dissolved into Anjou—Rivière-des-Prairies, Hochelaga—Maisonneuve, Mercier and Saint-Léonard

== Election results ==
1968 Canadian federal election
Party	Candidate	Votes
Liberal	Arthur Portelance	19,051
Progressive Conservative	Marcel Faribault	8,866
New Democratic	Denis Lazure	5,210
Ralliement créditiste	Gaëtan Bernard	873
Démocratisation Économique	Emile Laporte	365
Independent	Léo Larocque	358

1972 Canadian federal election
Party	Candidate	Votes
Liberal	Arthur Portelance	20,860
Social Credit	André Bernard	7,135
Progressive Conservative	Jacques Durand	7,066
New Democratic	Marius Minier	5,119

1974 Canadian federal election
Party	Candidate	Votes
Liberal	Arthur Portelance	20,698
Progressive Conservative	Lionel Rozon	6,557
Social Credit	Lise Lajeunesse	3,684
New Democratic	Marius Minier	3,234
Marxist–Leninist	Martial Blouin	344

1979 Canadian federal election
Party	Candidate	Votes
Liberal	Arthur Portelance	30,567
Social Credit	Jean-Guy Daoust	5,247
Progressive Conservative	Robert Letendre	4,711
New Democratic	Danielle Dubois	2,753
Rhinoceros	Marie Filleque Ferron	1,307
Union populaire	A. Léo Larocque	228
Marxist–Leninist	Marc Blouin	185

1980 Canadian federal election
Party	Candidate	Votes
Liberal	Arthur Portelance	29,232
New Democratic	Mariette Caron-Denis	4,506
Progressive Conservative	Marius Minier	3,245
Rhinoceros	Polack Eugène Antonyszyn	1,640
Social Credit	Rodolphe Ouellet	1,162
Not affiliated	Louis Lavoie	208
Union populaire	Carmen Dion	181
Not affiliated	Antoni St-Onge	118
Marxist–Leninist	Paul Ménard	87

1984 Canadian federal election
Party	Candidate	Votes
Progressive Conservative	Michel Gravel	20,870
Liberal	Lise Thibault	17,491
New Democratic	Carl Cyr	4,730
Rhinoceros	Jean-Claude Stardust Gouin	1,659
Parti nationaliste	Henriette Martin	1,313
Green	Rolf Bramann	720
Commonwealth of Canada	Roger Leclerc	96

== See also ==
- List of Canadian electoral districts
- Historical federal electoral districts of Canada
