= Michel Gravel =

Canadian politician

Member of the Canadian Parliament for Gamelin (electoral district)
- Preceded by: Arthur Portelance
- Succeeded by: riding dissolved

Personal details
- Born: 4 August 1939 (age 86) Montreal, Quebec
- Party: Progressive Conservative

Michel Gravel (born 4 August 1939 in Montreal, Quebec) is a former businessman and Progressive Conservative party politician who served in the House of Commons of Canada.

Gravel was elected in the Gamelin electoral district in the 1984 federal election and served in the 33rd Canadian Parliament. He left federal politics after this term of office and did not run in the 1988 federal election.

He was charged with bribery and fraud in 1986 after confessing to the receipt of $75,000 from businesspeople who were seeking federal government business. In December 1988, he pleaded guilty to these charges and was sentenced to a $50,000 fine and a year in a Montreal prison in February 1989. On 31 March 1989, correctional officials released him to a halfway house citing good behaviour, with full parole to begin that June.

Gravel later alleged before a Quebec Order of Engineers tribunal that fellow Progressive Conservative member Roch La Salle had also received bribes for government contracts. This led to criminal charges for two other Conservative Members of Parliament, Gilles Bernier and Richard Grisé.
