= Allan Koury =

Canadian politician (1930–2004)

Member of the Canadian Parliament for Hochelaga—Maisonneuve
- In office 1988–1993
- Preceded by: Édouard Desrosiers
- Succeeded by: Réal Ménard

Personal details
- Born: 22 November 1930 Sainte-Agathe-des-Monts, Quebec
- Died: 5 September 2004 (aged 73)
- Party: Progressive Conservative

Allan Koury (22 November 1930 – 5 September 2004) was a member of the House of Commons of Canada from 1988 to 1993. He was proprietor of business Mercerie Allan for 55 years, and created the Societes d'initiatives et de développement d'arteres commerciales (SIDAC), an association dedicated to commercial development.

Koury was born in Sainte-Agathe-des-Monts, Quebec.

He was elected in the 1988 federal election at the Hochelaga—Maisonneuve electoral district for the Progressive Conservative party. He served in the 34th Canadian Parliament after which he was defeated by Bloc Québécois candidate Réal Ménard in the 1993 federal election.

== Electoral record (partial) ==
1988 Canadian federal election: Hochelaga—Maisonneuve
| Party | Candidate | Votes | % | ±% | Expenditures |
|---|---|---|---|---|---|
| Progressive Conservative | Allan Koury | 16,246 | 39.25 | | $41,169 |
| Liberal | Serge Laprade | 14,168 | 34.23 | – | $30,456 |
| New Democratic | Gaétan Nadeau | 8,583 | 20.74 | | $43,353 |
| Rhinoceros | Marie Chou Chou Chouinard | 1,196 | 2.89 | – | $0 |
| Green | Marius Henry | 800 | 1.93 | | $519 |
| Marxist–Leninist | Christiane Robidoux | 159 | 0.38 | | $130 |
| Commonwealth of Canada | Sylvain Labelle | 122 | 0.29 | | $0 |
| Communist | Montserrat Escola | 114 | 0.28 | | $1,263 |
| Total valid votes | | 41,388 | 100.00 | | |
| Total rejected ballots | | 954 | | | |
| Turnout | | 42,342 | 69.14 | | |
| Electors on the lists | | 61,240 | | | |

Sources: Report of the Chief Electoral Officer, Thirty-fourth General Election, 1988; Report of the Chief Electoral Officer Respecting Election Expenses, 1988.
