= Gaétan Nadeau =

Gaétan Nadeau (born December 12, 1953) is a politician and author in the Canadian province of Quebec. He led the New Democratic Party of Quebec from April to September 1989 and helped bring about its autonomy from the New Democratic Party of Canada.

== Early life and political career before 1989 ==
Nadeau was born in Joliette in 1953. He was a Parti Québécois (PQ) activist before joining the New Democratic Party and served as an executive assistant to legislator Guy Chevrette. He was also a supporter of the municipal Montreal Citizens' Movement (MCM) and served on its economy committee. In 1988, he criticized what he described as the party's pro-corporate direction after its victory in the 1986 Montreal municipal election.

He ran for the House of Commons of Canada as the New Democratic Party candidate for Hochelaga—Maisonneuve in the 1988 federal election. He criticized the proposed Canada-United States Free Trade Agreement on the grounds that it would hurt manufacturing jobs in his riding. Nadeau was considered one of the party's strongest candidates in Quebec, and some party insiders believed he had a chance for an upset victory. In the event, he finished third against Progressive Conservative candidate Allan Koury.

Shortly before election day, Nadeau and six other NDP candidates with Quebec nationalist views held a press conference to denounce Canada's policies on bilingualism.

== New Democratic Party leader ==
Nadeau was elected to lead the Quebec New Democratic Party in April 1989, defeating incumbent leader Roland Morin. One of the primary issues of the leadership contest was the Quebec NDP's relationship with the federal party. At the time, the NDP had a single organization in Quebec that encompassed both the federal and provincial parties. Several members of the Quebec NDP opposed this connection and called for the provincial party to become autonomous. The provincial party was more inclined to support Quebec nationalism than the federal party; it supported the province's Charter of the French Language, opposed the Meech Lake Accord, and was sceptical toward the Canadian constitution because it was approved without Quebec's support. Nadeau favoured the creation of an autonomous provincial party, while Morin initially opposed the idea before declaring his neutrality.

Nadeau, who was thirty-five years old at the time, also highlighted the generational divide between himself and the fifty-seven-year-old Morin during the leadership contest. He said, "The leadership choice is clearly between a democratic socialist who has a vision for the '90s and one who is clinging to the outdated notions of the '70s." For his part, Morin described Nadeau as a single-issue candidate focused only on the environment. Nadeau defeated Morin at a party convention held on April 30, 1989; at the same meeting, the Quebec NDP voted in favour of autonomy from the federal party.

The NDP ran fifty-five candidates in the 1989 election. Its campaign began in confusion, when the party executive approved an election platform that Nadeau derided as "naive Marxism." He threatened to resign as party leader but refrained from doing so when the party executive withdrew the document. Nadeau later described the original platform as having resulted from the "fertile imagination" of a single party worker who misunderstood the instructions of its policy committee.

Nadeau secured a more prominent place for environmental issues in the party's revised platform. Against his wishes, the document also included an increased focus on Quebec nationalism. Nadeau opposed this approach on strategic grounds (notwithstanding his prior expression of nationalist views), arguing that it would not help the party's efforts to grow its base of support. Some political observers noted that the focus on nationalism prevented the NDP from winning support among anglophone Liberals who were disgruntled with the increasingly nationalist policies of premier Robert Bourassa.

Close to election day, Nadeau acknowledged that his party would not win any seats in the legislature. The NDP received about one per cent of the popular vote, and Nadeau received only 437 votes for a distant fourth-place finish in the Montreal division of Dorion. He resigned as party leader on September 26, 1989, one day after the election, saying that the Quebec NDP would never be able to succeed because of a "hard core of Marxists" hindering its development.

== Since 1989 ==
Nadeau was a researcher for the municipal Democratic Coalition party in the early 1990s.

== Electoral record ==
1989 Quebec general election: Dorion
| Party | Candidate | Votes | % |
|---|---|---|---|
| Liberal | Violette Trépanier | 11,632 | 51.00 |
| Parti Québécois | Joseph Facal | 9,425 | 41.33 |
| Green | Agnès Grimaud | 878 | 3.85 |
| New Democratic | Gaétan Nadeau | 437 | 1.92 |
| Lemon | Pierre Corbeil | 297 | 1.30 |
| Marxist–Leninist | Francine Tremblay | 137 | 0.60 |
| Total valid votes | | 22,806 | 100.00 |
| Rejected and declined votes | | 421 | |
| Turnout | | 23,227 | 76.03 |
| Electors on the lists | | 30,551 | |
Source: Official Results, Le Directeur général des élections du Québec.

Source: Official Results, Le Directeur général des élections du Québec.

1988 Canadian federal election: Hochelaga—Maisonneuve
| Party | Candidate | Votes | % | ±% | Expenditures |
|---|---|---|---|---|---|
| Progressive Conservative | Allan Koury | 16,246 | 39.25 | | $41,169 |
| Liberal | Serge Laprade | 14,168 | 34.23 | – | $30,456 |
| New Democratic | Gaétan Nadeau | 8,583 | 20.74 | | $43,353 |
| Rhinoceros | Marie Chou Chou Chouinard | 1,196 | 2.89 | – | $0 |
| Green | Marius Henry | 800 | 1.93 | | $519 |
| Marxist–Leninist | Christiane Robidoux | 159 | 0.38 | | $130 |
| Commonwealth of Canada | Sylvain Labelle | 122 | 0.29 | | $0 |
| Communist | Montserrat Escola | 114 | 0.28 | | $1,263 |
| Total valid votes | | 41,388 | 100.00 | | |
| Total rejected ballots | | 954 | | | |
| Turnout | | 42,342 | 69.14 | | |
| Electors on the lists | | 61,240 | | | |

Sources: Report of the Chief Electoral Officer, Thirty-fourth General Election, 1988; Report of the Chief Electoral Officer Respecting Election Expenses, 1988.
