= Maisonneuve—Rosemont =

Former federal electoral district in Quebec, Canada

Quebec electoral district

Defunct federal electoral district
- Legislature: House of Commons
- District created: 1933
- District abolished: 1976
- First contested: 1935
- Last contested: 1974

Maisonneuve—Rosemount (also known as Maisonneuve) was a federal electoral district in Quebec, Canada, that was represented in the House of Commons of Canada from 1935 to 1979.

This riding was created in 1933 from parts of Maisonneuve riding.

The electoral district was abolished in 1966 when it was redistributed between Gamelin, Lafontaine and a new Maisonneuve riding.

The new Maisonneuve riding was created from parts of Hochelaga, Mercier and Maisonneuve—Rosemont ridings. The name of this electoral district was changed in 1970 to "Maisonneuve—Rosemont". It was abolished in 1976 when it was redistributed into Gamelin, Maisonneuve, Rosemont and Saint-Léonard ridings.

== Members of Parliament ==
This riding elected the following members of Parliament:

| Parliament | Years | Member | Party |
|---|---|---|---|
Maisonneuve—Rosemont; Riding created from Maisonneuve
| 18th | 1935–1940 | Sarto Fournier | Liberal |
| 19th | 1940–1945 | Sarto Fournier | Liberal |
| 20th | 1945–1949 | Sarto Fournier | Liberal |
| 21st | 1949–1953 | Sarto Fournier | Liberal |
| 22nd | 1953–1957 | Jean-Paul Deschatelets | Liberal |
| 23rd | 1957–1958 | Jean-Paul Deschatelets | Liberal |
| 24th | 1958–1962 | Jean-Paul Deschatelets | Liberal |
| 25th | 1962–1963 | Jean-Paul Deschatelets | Liberal |
| 26th | 1963–1965 | Jean-Paul Deschatelets | Liberal |
| 27th | 1965–1968 | J. Antonio Thomas | Liberal |
Maisonneuve
| 28th | 1968–1972 | J. Antonio Thomas | Liberal |
Maisonneuve—Rosemont
| 29th | 1972–1974 | J. Antonio Thomas | Liberal |
| 30th | 1974–1979 | Serge Joyal | Liberal |
Riding dissolved into Gamelin, Maisonneuve, Rosemont and Saint-Léonard

== Election results ==
=== Maisonneuve—Rosemont, 1935–1968 ===
1935 Canadian federal election
| Party | Candidate | Votes |
|---|---|---|
| Liberal | Sarto Fournier | 10,807 |
| Conservative | Jean Fauteux | 7,539 |
| Reconstruction | Joseph-Ovila Cordeau | 6,145 |
| Liberal | François-Xavier Poirier | 783 |
| Liberal–Labour | Arthur Landry | 425 |

1940 Canadian federal election
| Party | Candidate | Votes |
|---|---|---|
| Liberal | Sarto Fournier | 17,442 |
| National Government | Pierre Desrosiers | 6,387 |

1945 Canadian federal election
| Party | Candidate | Votes |
|---|---|---|
| Liberal | Sarto Fournier | 13,556 |
| Bloc populaire | Jacques Sauriol | 6,718 |
| Progressive Conservative | William Tremblay | 5,320 |
| Independent | Ubald Fortin | 2,261 |
| Co-operative Commonwealth | Raoul-Jules Dion | 1,268 |
| Social Credit | Joseph-Alfred St-Laurent | 464 |
| Independent | Ulric Simard | 176 |

1949 Canadian federal election
| Party | Candidate | Votes |
|---|---|---|
| Liberal | Sarto Fournier | 20,512 |
| Progressive Conservative | Raoul-D. Gadbois | 8,804 |
| Union des électeurs | Paul Bougie | 1,207 |

1953 Canadian federal election
| Party | Candidate | Votes |
|---|---|---|
| Liberal | Jean-Paul Deschatelets | 12,266 |
| Independent Liberal | J.-Albert Tardif | 9,694 |
| Progressive Conservative | Pierre Desrosiers | 5,671 |
| Co-operative Commonwealth | René Rocque | 1,056 |
| Labor–Progressive | Alex Gauld | 566 |

1957 Canadian federal election
| Party | Candidate | Votes |
|---|---|---|
| Liberal | Jean-Paul Deschatelets | 25,041 |
| Progressive Conservative | Jean Jodoin | 7,718 |
| Co-operative Commonwealth | Clément Gauvin | 2,670 |

1958 Canadian federal election
| Party | Candidate | Votes |
|---|---|---|
| Liberal | Jean-Paul Deschatelets | 21,515 |
| Progressive Conservative | Jean Jodoin | 19,479 |
| Co-operative Commonwealth | John Bray | 2,276 |

1962 Canadian federal election
| Party | Candidate | Votes |
|---|---|---|
| Liberal | Jean-Paul Deschatelets | 18,016 |
| Progressive Conservative | Maurice Savignac | 11,696 |
| New Democratic | Fernand Daoust | 6,314 |
| Social Credit | J.-Clément Lévesque | 2,003 |
| Independent Liberal | Alexander Kindy | 942 |

1963 Canadian federal election
| Party | Candidate | Votes |
|---|---|---|
| Liberal | Jean-Paul Deschatelets | 20,595 |
| New Democratic | Fernand Daoust | 7,798 |
| Progressive Conservative | Maurice Savignac | 7,711 |
| Social Credit | Horace Pelletier | 6,025 |

1965 Canadian federal election
| Party | Candidate | Votes |
|---|---|---|
| Liberal | J. Antonio Thomas | 17,663 |
| New Democratic | Roland Morin | 9,753 |
| Progressive Conservative | Jean Jodoin | 8,027 |
| Ralliement créditiste | Richard Lavigne | 3,244 |

=== Maisonneuve, 1968–1972 ===
1968 Canadian federal election
| Party | Candidate | Votes |
|---|---|---|
| Liberal | J. Antonio Thomas | 15,784 |
| Progressive Conservative | Romuald Beaulieu | 5,522 |
| New Democratic | Roland Morin | 4,588 |
| Ralliement créditiste | Henri Paquet | 1,233 |

=== Maisonneuve—Rosemont, 1972–1979 ===
1972 Canadian federal election
| Party | Candidate | Votes |
|---|---|---|
| Liberal | J. Antonio Thomas | 13,607 |
| Progressive Conservative | Paul-André Trudeau | 6,551 |
| Social Credit | Gilles Morissette | 5,877 |
| New Democratic | Gaétan Dufour | 3,786 |
| Independent | Robert Bureau | 294 |

1974 Canadian federal election
| Party | Candidate | Votes |
|---|---|---|
| Liberal | Serge Joyal | 13,817 |
| Progressive Conservative | Lise Bourque | 6,053 |
| Social Credit | Gilles Morissette | 2,783 |
| New Democratic | Lionel J. Desjardins | 2,186 |
| Communist | Bernadette Le Brun | 200 |
| Marxist–Leninist | Mario Verrier | 156 |

== See also ==
- List of Canadian electoral districts
- Historical federal electoral districts of Canada
