= Hochelaga—Maisonneuve (federal electoral district) =

Former federal electoral district in Quebec, Canada

Quebec electoral district
- Coordinates: 45.549°N 73.544°W

Defunct federal electoral district
- Legislature: House of Commons
- District created: 1976
- District abolished: 2003
- First contested: 1979
- Last contested: 2000

Hochelaga—Maisonneuve (French pronunciation: [ɔʃlaɡa mɛzɔ̃nœv]; formerly known as Maisonneuve) was a federal electoral district in Quebec, Canada, that was represented in the House of Commons of Canada from 1979 to 2004.

It was created in 1976 as "Maisonneuve" riding from parts of Hochelaga, Lafontaine and Maisonneuve—Rosemont ridings. It was renamed "Hochelaga—Maisonneuve" in 1978.

The riding was abolished in 2003 when it was redistributed into Hochelaga, Honoré-Mercier and La Pointe-de-l'Île ridings.

== Members of Parliament ==
This riding elected the following members of Parliament:

Parliament	Years	Member	Party
Hochelaga—Maisonneuve; Riding created from Hochelaga, Lafontaine and Maisonneuve—Rosemont
31st	1979–1980	Serge Joyal	Liberal
32nd	1980–1984	Serge Joyal	Liberal
33rd	1984–1988	Édouard Desrosiers	Progressive Conservative
34th	1988–1993	Allan Koury	Progressive Conservative
35th	1993–1997	Réal Ménard	Bloc Québécois
36th	1997–2000	Réal Ménard	Bloc Québécois
37th	2000–2004	Réal Ménard	Bloc Québécois
Riding dissolved into Hochelaga, Honoré-Mercier and La Pointe-de-l'Île

== Election results ==
1979 Canadian federal election
Party	Candidate	Votes
Liberal	Serge Joyal	21,059
Social Credit	André Aubry	3,769
Progressive Conservative	André Coutu	3,605
Not affiliated	Jacques Lavoie	1,837
New Democratic	Marie-Ange Gagnon-Sirois	1,746
Rhinoceros	Daniel Bouf-Bouf Bouffard	1,097
Union populaire	Réginald Reggie Chartrand	644
Marxist–Leninist	Pierre Chenier	114
Communist	Danielle Ferland	92
Not affiliated	Michel Dugré	60

1980 Canadian federal election
Party	Candidate	Votes
Liberal	Serge Joyal	21,138
New Democratic	Marie-Ange Gagnon-Sirois	2,732
Progressive Conservative	Yves Bourget	1,977
Rhinoceros	Diane Gougeon	1,412
Social Credit	Roger Hébert	873
Not affiliated	Robert Coté	286
Independent	Jacques Beaudoin	200
Marxist–Leninist	Pierre Chenier	98
Union populaire	Sylvain Morissette	98

1984 Canadian federal election
Party	Candidate	Votes
Progressive Conservative	Édouard Desrosiers	13,244
Liberal	Serge Joyal	12,201
New Democratic	Marie-Ange Gagnon-Sirois	3,596
Rhinoceros	Richard A. Sirois	1,847
Parti nationaliste	Réal Ménard	1,089
Communist	Gaetan Trudel	99
Commonwealth of Canada	Daniel Gonzales	63

1988 Canadian federal election
Party	Candidate	Votes
Progressive Conservative	Allan Koury	16,246
Liberal	Serge Laprade	14,168
New Democratic	Gaétan Nadeau	8,583
Rhinoceros	Marie Chou Chou Chouinard	1,196
Green	Marius Henry	800
Not affiliated	Christiane Robidoux	159
Commonwealth of Canada	Sylvain Labelle	122
Communist	Montserrat Escola	114

1993 Canadian federal election
Party	Candidate	Votes
Bloc Québécois	Réal Ménard	26,052
Liberal	Jules Léger	10,760
Progressive Conservative	Allan Koury	3,838
New Democratic	Paul Vachon	955
Natural Law	Richard Lauzon	576
Marxist–Leninist	Christine Dandenault	259
Commonwealth of Canada	Steve Bélanger	184

1997 Canadian federal election
Party	Candidate	Votes
Bloc Québécois	Réal Ménard	21,938
Liberal	Denise Malo	16,308
Progressive Conservative	Charles Boudreault	7,583
New Democratic	Milan Mirich	825
Natural Law	Richard Lauzon	577
Marxist–Leninist	Christine Dandenault	444

2000 Canadian federal election
Party	Candidate	Votes
Bloc Québécois	Réal Ménard	21,249
Liberal	Louis Morena	16,143
Progressive Conservative	Benoit Harbec	1,751
Alliance	Stephanie Morency	1,502
Marijuana	Alex Néron	1,227
New Democratic	Milan Mirich	767
Marxist–Leninist	Christine Dandenault	275
Communist	Pierre Bibeau	274

== See also ==
- List of Canadian electoral districts
- Historical federal electoral districts of Canada
