= Arthur Portelance =

Canadian politician

Arthur Portelance (19 March 1928 – 27 November 2008) was a Canadian businessman and politician. Portelance served as a Liberal party member of the House of Commons of Canada. He was a salesman and businessman by career.

Born in Montreal, Quebec, Portelance represented Quebec's Gamelin electoral district which he first won office in the 1968 federal election. He was re-elected there in the 1972, 1974, 1979 and 1980 federal elections.

Portelance served five successive terms from the 28th to the 32nd Canadian Parliaments. He was later appointed to the Canadian Aviation Safety Board in 1984 by Prime Minister John Turner, who wanted to have a woman run in Gamelin in that year's election. He was a board member until its demise in 1990.
