= J. Antonio Thomas =

Canadian politician

- Official 1973 portrait

Member of Parliament for Maisonneuve—Rosemont
- In office November 1965 – June 1968

Member of Parliament for Maisonneuve, Maisonneuve—Rosemont
- In office June 1968 – May 1974

Personal details
- Born: 13 September 1912 Montreal, Quebec, Canada
- Died: 19 January 1998 (aged 85) Montreal, Quebec, Canada
- Party: Liberal
- Profession: foreman, superintendent

Joseph Antonio Thomas (13 September 1912 – 19 January 1998) was a Liberal party member of the House of Commons of Canada. He was a foreman and superintendent by career.

He was first elected at the Maisonneuve—Rosemont riding in the 1965 general election, then after a 1966 realignment of riding boundaries he was re-elected at the Maisonneuve riding in the 1968 federal election. That riding was given the Maisonneuve—Rosemont name in 1970 where in the 1972 election Thomas was re-elected. After completing his term in the 29th Canadian Parliament, he left federal office and did not campaign in any further federal elections.
