= Édouard Desrosiers =

Canadian politician

Édouard Desrosiers (born 26 August 1934) was a Progressive Conservative party member of the House of Commons of Canada. He was a singer by career.

Born in Montreal, Quebec, Desrosiers was elected at the Hochelaga—Maisonneuve riding in the 1984 federal election, thus serving in the 33rd Canadian Parliament. He did not seek another term in office and left federal politics following the 1988 federal election.

His brother was Jacques Desrosiers
